= 1950 New Year Honours =

British royal recognitions

The 1950 New Years Honours were appointments in many of the Commonwealth realms of King George VI to various orders and honours to reward and highlight good works by citizens of those countries. They were announced on 2 January 1950 for the United Kingdom, New Zealand, India, and Ceylon.

The recipients of honours are displayed here as they were styled before their new honour, and arranged by honour, with classes (Knight, Knight Grand Cross, etc.) and then divisions (Military, Civil, etc.) as appropriate.

== United Kingdom and Colonies ==
=== Viscounts ===
- The Right Honourable Albert Victor Alexander, CH, LLD, MP, Minister of Defence. First Lord of the Admiralty, 1929–1931; 1940–1945; 1945–1948. Member of Parliament for the Hillsborough Division of Sheffield, 1922–1931; and since 1935.

=== Barons ===
- Sir (Alexander) Steven Bilsland, Bt., MC, LLD. For public services in Scotland.
- Thomas William Burden, CBE, JP, MP, Member of Parliament for the Park Division of Sheffield since 1942. Second Church Estates Commissioner since 1945. For political and public services.
- Leslie Haden-Guest, MC, MRCS, LRCP, MP, Member of Parliament for Southwark North, 1923 and 1924, and for Islington North since 1927. For political and public services.
- Joseph Henderson, JP, MP, Member of Parliament for the Ardwick Division of Manchester, June–October, 1931, and since 1935. A Lord Commissioner of HM Treasury since 1945.
- The Right Honourable John Wilmot, MP, Member of Parliament for East Fulham, 1931–1935; for Kennington, 1935–1945; and for Deptford since 1945. Minister of Supply, 1945–1947. For political and public services.

=== Privy Counsellors ===
- Sir Ronald Ian Campbell, GCMG, CB, His Majesty's Ambassador Extraordinary and Plenipotentiary at Cairo.
- The Honourable Edward James Holloway, lately Minister for Labour and National Service in the Commonwealth of Australia.
- The Honourable Don Stephen Senanayake, Prime Minister and Minister of Defence and External Affairs of Ceylon.

=== Knights Bachelor ===
- Robert Henry Adcock, CBE, Clerk of the Lancashire County Council.
- Colin Skelton Anderson, President of the Chamber of Shipping of the United Kingdom.
- Harold Esmond Arnison Boldero, DM, FRCP, Dean of the Medical School, Middlesex Hospital. Registrar, Royal College of Physicians.
- Professor Arthur Lyon Bowley, CBE, ScD, DLitt. For services to the study of statistics and economics.
- Leslie Stuart Brass, CBE, Legal Adviser, Home Office.
- Andrew Meikle Bryan, MIMinE, HM Chief Inspector of Mines, Ministry of Fuel and Power.
- Arthur Wallace Pickard-Cambridge, DLitt, LLD, FBA, deputy chairman, Public School Governing Bodies Association. For services to education.
- Colonel Robert Chapman, CB, CMG, CBE, DSO, TD, FCA, chairman, Finchale Abbey Training Centre for the Disabled, County Durham.
- John Alexander Charles, MD, FRCP, Deputy Chief Medical Officer, Ministry of Health.
- Henry Laurence Urling Clark, lately Chairman of the Council of the Stock Exchange.
- Cuthbert Barwick Clegg, vice-president, British Employers' Confederation.
- John Ninian Comper, Architect.
- John Albert Godfrey, Chief Inspector, Board of Customs and Excise.
- Philip Hendy, Director of the National Gallery.
- John Dunlop Imrie, CBE, JP, City Chamberlain of Edinburgh.
- Charles George Maby, CBE, Chief Constable of Bristol.
- William McGilvray, CBE, National Coal Supplies Officer.
- Edward Bertram Monkhouse, CBE, Timber Controller, Board of Trade.
- Horace Alvarez De Courcy Pereira, Senior Registrar, Principal Probate Registry.
- Judge John Seymour Blake-Reed, OBE, lately Senior British Judge of the Egyptian Mixed Court of Appeal.
- Arthur Sims. For services to medicine and education in the British Commonwealth.
- Professor Arthur George Tansley, FRS, Chairman of the Nature Conservancy.
- Harold Vincent Tewson, CBE, MC, General Secretary, Trades Union Congress.
- William Willis Dalziel Thomson, MD, FRCP, DL, Professor of Medicine, Queen's University, Belfast.
- Ralph Lilley Turner, MC, LittD, FBA, Director, School of Oriental and African Studies, University of London.
- John Coldbrook Hanbury-Williams, Chairman of Courtaulds, Ltd. For public services.
- Richard Ernest Yeabsley, CBE, FCA, FSAA, Accountant Adviser to the Board of Trade and the Central Price Regulation Committee.

State of South Australia

- Eric Millhouse, KC. For public services in the State of South Australia.
- Thomas George Wilson, CMG, MD, FRCS (Ed.)., Director of Obstetrics and Gynaecology, University of Adelaide, State of South Australia. For public and philanthropic services.

State of Victoria

- The Honourable James Arthur Kennedy, Member of the Legislative Council, State of Victoria. For public services.

Colonies, Protectorates, Etc.

- Robert Beacroft Barker, OBE. For public services in Jamaica.
- Theo Chandos Hoskyns-Abrahall, CMG, Colonial Administrative Service, Chief Commissioner, Western Provinces, Nigeria.
- Charles Edward Mortimer, CBE, Member for Health and Local Government, Kenya.
- Sidney John Saint, CMG, OBE, MSc, PhD, Colonial Agricultural Service, Director of Agriculture, Barbados.
- Newnham Arthur Worley Colonial Legal Service, Chief Justice, British Guiana.

=== Order of the Bath ===
==== Knights Grand Cross of the Order of the Bath (GCB) ====
Military Division

- Admiral Sir Arthur John Power, GBE, KCB, CVO.
- Field Marshal Sir William Joseph Slim, GBE, KCB, DSO, MC, (8709), Special List (ex-Indian Army).

Civil Division

- Sir William Scott Douglas, KCB, KBE, Secretary, Ministry of Health.

==== Knights Commander of the Order of the Bath (KCB) ====
Military Division

Royal Navy

- Vice-Admiral The Honourable Cyril Eustace Douglas-Pennant, CB, CBE, DSO.
- Vice-Admiral Edward Desmond Bewley McCarthy, CB, DSO.

Army

- General Sir Evelyn Hugh Barker, KBE, CB, DSO, MC, ADC (Gen.), (8095), late Infantry.
- Lieutenant-General John Francis Martin Whiteley, CB, CBE, MC, (10235), late Corps of Royal Engineers.

Royal Air Force

- Air Marshal Sir Alec Coryton, KBE, CB, MVO, DFC.
- Air Marshal Sir Hugh William Lumsden Saunders, KBE, CB, MC, DFC, MM.

Civil Division

- Frank Godbould Lee, CMG, Permanent Secretary, Ministry of Food.
- Sir Frank Aubrey Newsam, KBE, CVO, MC, Permanent Under-Secretary of State for the Home Department.
- Robert Leslie Overbury, CB, Clerk of the Parliaments.
- Sir George Wilfred Turner, KBE, CB, Permanent Under-Secretary of State, War Office.

==== Companions of the Order of the Bath (CB) ====
Military Division

Royal Navy

- Rear-Admiral Edmund Walter Anstice.
- Rear-Admiral (L) Stuart Latham Bateson, CBE, AMIEE.
- Instructor Captain William Alfred Bishop, OBE.
- Rear-Admiral Charles Philip Clarke, DSO.
- Rear-Admiral (E) William Godfrey Cowland.
- Rear-Admiral Eric William Longley Longley-Cook, CBE, DSO.
- Rear-Admiral Cecil Aubrey Lawson Mansergh, DSC.
- Surgeon Rear-Admiral Joseph Archibald Maxwell, CVO, CBE, MB, BCh, FRCS(Ed.), KHS, (Retired).
- Rear-Admiral Angus Dacres Nicholl, CBE, DSO.

Army

- Brigadier Edward Gordon Audland, CBE, MC, (17850), late Royal Regiment of Artillery.
- Major-General William Maurice Broomhall, DSO, OBE, (13364), late Corps of Royal Engineers.
- Major-General Reginald Llewellyn Brown, CBE, (12055), late Corps of Royal Engineers.
- Major-General Archibald James Halkett Cassels, CBE, DSO, (36316), late Infantry.
- Major-General Ronald Basil Bowen Bancroft Cooke, CBE, DSO, (403), late Royal Armoured Corps.
- Major-General Maurice Nelson Dewing, CBE, DSO, MC, (13421), late Royal Regiment of Artillery.
- Major-General Harold John Higgins, OBE, FDS, KHDS, (15754), late Royal Army Dental Corps.
- Brigadier Cecil Edward Ronald Ince, CBE, (35158), late Royal Army Service Corps.
- Major-General Albert Percy Lambooy, OBE, (12085), late Royal Regiment of Artillery.
- Major-General (temporary) Francis Robert Henry Mollan, OBE, MC, (5666), late Royal Army Medical Corps.
- Brigadier William Carden-Roe, CBE, MC, (8228), late Infantry.
- Major-General William Arthur Scott, CBE, (11948), late Royal Corps of Signals.
- Brigadier Charles Roger Alan Swynnerton, DSO, ADC, (438), late Infantry.

Royal Air Force

- Air Vice-Marshal David Vaughan Carnegie, CBE, AFC.
- Air Vice-Marshal Edgar James Kingston-McCloughry, CBE, DSO, DFC.
- Air Vice-Marshal Terence Charles St Clessie Morton, OBE, MD, ChB, FRCP, DPH, DPM, DTM&H, KHP.
- Air Vice-Marshal Claude Bernard Raymond Pelly, CBE, MC.
- Air Vice-Marshal Charles Basil Slater Spackman, CBE, DFC.
- Acting Air Vice-Marshal Leslie John Vernon Bates, CBE.
- Air Commodore John Francis Titmas, CBE, AFRAeS.
- Group Captain John Oliver William Oliver, DSO, DFC.

Civil Division

- Colonel Douglas Stephenson Branson, DSO, MC, TD, chairman, Territorial and Auxiliary Forces Association, West Riding of Yorkshire.
- Reuben Kelf-Cohen, Under-Secretary, Ministry of Fuel and Power.
- Francis Alfred Enever, MC, LLD, Principal Assistant Solicitor, Office of HM Procurator-General and Treasury Solicitor.
- George Herbert Fretwell, MICE, Director-General of Works, Air Ministry.
- Alexander Glen, MC, Deputy Secretary, Department of Agriculture for Scotland.
- Arthur Hulin Gosling, Director-General, Forestry Commission.
- William Graham, MBE, Under-Secretary, Ministry of Transport.
- Robert Lowe Hall, Director, Economic Section, Cabinet Office.
- Stewart Scott Hall, MSc, FRAeS, Director-General of Technical Development (Air), Ministry of Supply.
- Laurence Norman Helsby, Principal Private Secretary to the Prime Minister.
- Owen Haddon Wansbrough-Jones, OBE, PhD, Scientific Adviser to the Army Council.
- Eric Denyer Marris, Under-Secretary, Ministry of Education.
- Edward Francis Muir, Under-Secretary, Ministry of Works.
- Alfred John Newling, CBE, MVO, TD, Under-Secretary, Ministry of Defence.
- Victor George Shepheard, MINA, deputy director of Naval Construction, Admiralty.
- Stephen Shipley Wilson, Under-Secretary, Ministry of Supply.
- Alfred John Digby Winnifrith, Under-Secretary, HM Treasury.
- John Ernest Yates, CBE, DCM, Director of Postal Services, General Post Office.

=== Order of Saint Michael and Saint George ===
==== Knights Grand Cross of the Order of St Michael and St George (GCMG) ====
- Sir John Hathorn Hall, KCMG, DSO, OBE, MC, Governor and Commander-in-Chief, Uganda.
- Sir David Victor Kelly, KCMG, MC, His Majesty's Ambassador Extraordinary and Plenipotentiary at Moscow.

==== Knights Commander of the Order of St Michael and St George (KCMG) ====
- George Lewis French Bolton, executive director, International Monetary Fund.
- Stephen Lewis Holmes, CMG, MC, Second Secretary, Board of Trade.
- The Honourable Sir Robert James Hudson, CMG, MC, Chief Justice of Southern Rhodesia, and Acting Governor of the Colony on several occasions.
- Charles Roy Price, CMG, High Commissioner in New Zealand for His Majesty's Government in the United Kingdom.
- Christopher William Machell Cox, CMG, Adviser on Education to the Secretary of State for the Colonies.
- Harold Anthony Caccia, CMG, until recently a Deputy Under-Secretary of State in the Foreign Office, now His Majesty's Envoy Extraordinary and Minister Plenipotentiary in Vienna.
- Pierson John Dixon, CB, CMG, His Majesty's Ambassador Extraordinary and Plenipotentiary at Prague.
- James Leishman Dodds, CMG, His Majesty's Ambassador Extraordinary and Plenipotentiary at Lima.
- Harold Lister Farquhar, CMG, MC, His Majesty's Ambassador Extraordinary and Plenipotentiary at Stockholm.

==== Companions of the Order of St Michael and St George (CMG) ====
- Brigadier John Ashworth Barraclough, DSO, OBE, MC, Deputy Regional Commissioner, Land North Rhine, Westphalia, Control Commission for Germany, British Element.
- Robert Birley, lately Educational Adviser to the Military Governor and Commander-in-Chief, Control Commission for Germany, British Element.
- Victor Spencer Butler, Under-Secretary, Ministry of Fuel and Power.
- Alexander Kirkland Cairncross, PhD, lately Economic Adviser, Board of Trade.
- Allan Christelow, Under-Secretary, HM Treasury Delegation to Washington.
- Major John Ronald McGrindle, OBE, MC, Member of the Board of British Overseas Airways Corporation.
- Philip Eric Millbourn, MIMechE, Adviser on Shipping in Port, Ministry of Transport.
- Alec Stephen Warren, Director of Canned Fish, Fruit and Vegetables, and Wholesale Trade Adviser, Ministry of Food.
- Edward Betham Beetham, CVO, OBE Resident Commissioner of Swaziland.
- Russell John Dumas, MEng, MInstCE, Director of Works, State of Western Australia.
- William Aitken Brown Hamilton, an Assistant Under-Secretary of State in the Commonwealth Relations Office.
- Alderman Richard Olver Harris, JP, Lord Mayor of the City of Hobart, State of Tasmania.
- Arthur Vincent Aston, MC, Colonial Administrative Service, Resident Commissioner, Penang, Federation of Malaya.
- Kenneth William Blaxter, Assistant Secretary, Colonial Office.
- Emanuel Camilleri, OBE, Secretary to the Maltese Imperial Government.
- Charles Young Carstairs, Administrative Secretary, Office of the Comptroller for Development and Welfare in the West Indies.
- James Cheyne, Colonial Administrative Service, Secretary for African Affairs, Tanganyika.
- William Johnston, Colonial Customs Service, Commissioner of Customs and Excise, East Africa High Commission.
- Anthony Bernard Killick, Colonial Agricultural Service, Director of Agriculture, Uganda.
- Clement John Pleass, Colonial Administrative Service, Development Secretary, Nigeria.
- Patrick Muir Renison, Colonial Administrative Service, Colonial Secretary, Trinidad.
- John Montague Stow, Colonial Administrative Service, Administrator of Saint Lucia, Windward Islands.
- Brewster Joseph Surridge, OBE, Adviser on Co-operation to the Secretary of State for the Colonies.
- Cecil James Thomas, Financial Secretary, Cyprus.
- Neil Archibald Campbell Weir, OBE, ED, Colonial Administrative Service, Senior Commissioner, Gambia.
- Alexander Thomas Williams, MBE, Colonial Administrative Service, Administrative Secretary, Northern Rhodesia.
- William Denis Allen, Counsellor at His Majesty's Embassy in Washington.
- Geoffrey Herbert Barter, Director of Establishments, Sudan Government.
- Bernard Alexander Brocas Burrows, Head of the Eastern Department of the Foreign Office.
- Walter Fergusson Crawford, OBE, Head of the Development Division, British Middle East Office, Cairo.
- George Edmond Crombie, lately Counsellor at His Majesty's Embassy in Rangoon.
- David John Footman, MC, attached to the Foreign Office.
- William Murray Graham, CBE, lately Judge of the Mixed Court of Appeal, Egypt.
- John Henry Keswick, a British subject resident in China.
- Laurence Brouncker Southey Larkins, OBE, Counsellor (Commercial) at His Majesty's Embassy at The Hague.
- Francis Ralph Hay Murray, Head of the Information Research Department of the Foreign Office.
- William John Sullivan, CBE, British Political Adviser to the Commander, British-United States Zone, Free Territory of Trieste.

=== Royal Victorian Order ===
==== Knights Grand Cross of the Royal Victorian Order (GCVO) ====
- The Right Honourable Boyd, Baron Merriman, OBE, LLD.
- Colonel Sir Henry Davies Foster MacGeagh, KCB, KBE, TD, KC.

==== Knights Commander of the Royal Victorian Order (KCVO) ====
- Harold Kingston Graham Hodgson, CVO, FRCP, MB, BS, DMRE.
- The Very Reverend Charles Laing Warr, CVO, DD.
- Norman Richard Combe Warwick, CVO, OBE.

==== Commanders of the Royal Victorian Order (CVO) ====
- The Honourable George Rothe Bellew, MVO.
- Brigadier Ivan de la Bere, CBE.
- Patrick Graham Toler Kingsley.

==== Members of the Royal Victorian Order, 4th class (MVO) ====
- Holroyd Ferris Chambers.
- William McIntosh, MVO.
- Roy Robinson.
- Herbert Arthur Charlie Sturgess.
- Hugh Walter Kingwell Wontner.

==== Members of the Royal Victorian Order, 5th class (MVO) ====
- William Anthony Beck, MBE.
- John Stuart Bordewich.
- Arthur Edward Pottinger.

=== Order of the British Empire ===
==== Knights Grand Cross of the Order of the British Empire (GBE) ====
Military Division

- Admiral Sir Robert Lindsay Burnett, KCB, KBE, DSO.

Civil Division

- Sir (Arthur) Malcolm Trustram Eve, Bt., MC, TD, KC, lately chairman, Central Land Board and War Damage Commission.
- The Right Honourable Giles Stephen Holland, Earl of Ilchester, OBE, DLitt, FSA. For services to Art and Letters.
- Sir Donald St. Clair Gainer, KCMG, OBE, His Majesty's Ambassador Extraordinary and Plenipotentiary at Warsaw.

==== Dames Commander of the Order of the British Empire (DBE) ====
Military Division

- Jocelyn May Woollcombe, CBE, Hon. ADC, Director, Women's Royal Naval Service.

Civil Division

- Madame Adeline Genée, Mus. Doc., (Mrs. Genée-Isitt), President of the Royal Academy of Dancing. For services to the ballet.
- Olive Annie Wheeler, DSc, Professor of Education, and Dean of the Faculty of Education, University College of South Wales, Cardiff.

==== Knights Commander of the Order of the British Empire (KBE) ====
Military Division

Royal Navy

- Vice-Admiral Randolph Stewart Gresham Nicholson, CB, DSO, DSC.

Army

- Lieutenant-General George Watkin Eben James Erskine, CB, DSO, (15806), late Infantry.
- Lieutenant-General Cameron Gordon Graham Nicholson, CB, CBE, DSO, MC, (13382), late Royal Regiment of Artillery.
- Lieutenant-General Ouvry Lindfield Roberts, CB, CBE, DSO, BA, (10009), late Corps of Royal Engineers.

Royal Air Force

- Air Vice-Marshal Alexander Paul Davidson, CB, CBE.
- Air Vice-Marshal Anthony Lauderdale Paxton, CB, CBE, DFC.

Civil Division

- Frederick Brundrett, CB, Chief of the Royal Naval Scientific Service.
- James Ian Cormack Crombie, CMG, Third Secretary, HM Treasury.
- Reginald Hector Franklin CB, CBE, Deputy Secretary, Ministry of Agriculture and Fisheries.
- Sir Miles Ewart Mitchell, JP. For services to Local Government.
- Sir Percy Joseph Sillitoe, CBE, DL, Director, War Office.
- Cyril Hubert Cane, CBE, His Majesty's Consul-General at Rabat.
- Robert William Urquhart, CMG, OBE, His Majesty's Consul-General at Shanghai.
- Thomas Ernest Victor Hurley, CB, CMG, VD, MD, FRCS, of the State of Victoria. For public services.
- Patrick Alexander Bruce McKerron, CMG, Colonial Administrative Service, Colonial Secretary, Singapore.
- Eric Westbury Thompstone, CMG, MC, Colonial Administrative Service, Chief Commissioner, Northern Provinces, Nigeria.

Honorary Knight Commander

- Adesoji Aderemi, CMG, Oni of Ife, First Class Chief, Nigeria.

==== Commanders of the Order of the British Empire (CBE) ====
Military Division

Royal Navy

- Acting Rear-Admiral (S) Hubert Percival Chapman, OBE.
- Surgeon Captain Thomas Norman D'Arcy, LRCP&S, DOMS.
- Superintendent Anne McNeil, OBE, Women's Royal Naval Service.
- Captain Thomas Davys Manning, VRD, Royal Naval Volunteer Reserve.
- Captain (E) John Herbert Percival Southsy, (Retired).
- Major-General Humphrey Thomas Tollemache, Royal Marines.

Army

- Brigadier (temporary) Charles James George Dalton, OBE, (18839), late Royal Regiment of Artillery.
- Brigadier (temporary) John Robert Crosse Hamilton, DSO, (34438), Corps of Royal, Engineers.
- Controller (acting) Catherine Elizabeth Hammond (196073), Women's Royal Army Corps.
- Controller Lilian May Hunnings, RRC, (206197), Queen Alexandra's Royal Army Nursing Corps.
- Colonel Walter Henry Victor Jones, MBE, (15164), late Infantry.
- Colonel (acting) Charles Eric Lightfoot, OBE, (275931), Territorial Army Reserve of Officers, Special List, Army Cadet Force.
- Brigadier (temporary) Harold William Perryer, OBE, MIMechE, AMIEE, (14334), Royal Electrical and Mechanical Engineers.
- The Reverend Victor Joseph Pike, OBE, MA, (53409), Chaplain to the Forces, First Class, Royal Army Chaplains' Department.
- Brigadier (local) Lawrence George Robertson, OBE, ARICS, (36328), Corps of Royal Engineers.
- Colonel Roger Hierom Gerard Ogilvy Spence (39494), late Infantry.
- Brigadier (temporary) Dennis Charles Tarrant Swan (432), Corps of Royal Engineers.
- Brigadier (temporary) Ronald Ernest Wood (14311), Corps of Royal Engineers.
- Brigadier (temporary) James Richard Glencoe André, DSO, (17888), late Infantry, Commandant, The Malay Regiment.

Royal Air Force

- Acting Air Commodore John Marson.
- Acting Air Commodore Herbert Martin Massey, DSO, MC.
- Acting Air Commodore John William Moncur, MICE.
- Acting Air Commodore Walter Philip George Pretty, OBE.
- Group Captain Bernard Leslie Blofeld.
- Group Captain Edward Hugh Markham David, OBE.
- Group Captain Andrew Harvey, MB, BCh, DPH.
- Group Captain Richard Rupert Nash.
- Acting Group Captain Frank Henry Bedford, OBE, MC, MM.
- Group Captain Ronald Joseph Cohen, AFC, Royal New Zealand Air Force.

Civil Division
Commanders of the Civil Division of the said Most Excellent Order

- Louis Arnold Abraham, Principal Clerk, Private Bill Office, House of Commons.
- Janet Kerr Aitken, MD, FRCP, Consulting Physician, Elizabeth Garrett Anderson Hospital. Member of the Council of the Royal College of Physicians.
- John Anderson, OBE, MIEE, Chief Scientist, HM Underwater Detection Establishment, Portland.
- Frank Colin Bagnall, chairman, Wales Business Training Committee.
- Leslie James Banks, Actor.
- Major Maurice Edward Barclay, TD, chairman, Hertfordshire Agricultural Executive Committee.
- James Robert Beard, MSc, MICE, MIEE, Senior Partner, Merz and McLellan Consulting Engineers.
- John William Blower, JP, FCIS, Chairman of the Co-operative Union, Ltd.
- Charles William Boyce, FCA, Joint Director of Finance, Wool Control, Board of Trade.
- Robert Vivian Bradlaw, FRCS, MDS, FDSRCS, Dean of the Faculty of Dental Surgery, Royal College of Surgeons of England, Professor of Oral Pathology, University of Durham.
- Alexander Calder, Convener of Orkney County Council.
- John Graham-Campbell, Yr. of Shirvan, chairman, Argyll Agricultural Executive Committee.
- Oswald John Buxton Cole, OBE, Chief Constable of Leicester.
- Frank Collindridge, JP, MP, Member of Parliament for Barnsley since 1938. Comptroller of HM Household since 1946.
- Osbert Guy Stanhope Crawford, FBA, FSA (Scot.), Archaeologist.
- Kenneth Curtis, Assistant Secretary, Ministry of National Insurance.
- Wilfred Harry Curtis, Assistant Secretary, War Office.
- George Daniel, MINA, Chief Ship Surveyor, Ministry of Transport.
- Evan Thomas Davis, Chief Education Officer, West Sussex.
- Howard Winnington Dawes, FRCVS, President, Royal College of Veterinary Surgeons, 1946–1949.
- Commander Sir Hugh Trevor Dawson, Bt., Royal Navy (Retired), chairman, Sea Cadet Corps Sports Council.
- Josiah Eccles, MM, MIEE, MICE, MIMechE, chairman, Merseyside and North Wales Electricity Board.
- Harold Fearnley Farrar, managing director, Farrar Brothers, Ltd., Worsted Spinners, Halifax.
- The Honourable Henrietta Franklin, Honorary Secretary of the Parents' National Educational Union.
- Duncan Fraser, Lord Provost of the City of Aberdeen.
- Alfred Henry Garrett, Assistant Secretary, Board of Customs and Excise.
- Charles James Gibbons, Assistant Secretary, Central Land Board and War Damage Commission.
- Isaac Charles Ginner, ARA, Painter.
- James Alexander Glen, Assistant Secretary, Ministry of Education, Northern Ireland.
- William Glennie, MM, Controller, Scotland, Ministry of National Insurance.
- Léon Jean Goossens, ARAM, ARCM. Oboist. For services to Music.
- The Reverend Harold Myers Grace, Secretary for Africa, Conference of British Missionary Societies.
- James Johnstone Gracie, MIEE, chairman, Greater Birmingham Local Employment Committee.
- Mary Hermione Hichens, ARRC, JP, Member of the Catering Wages Commission.
- George Edward Holden, OBE, MSc, FRIC, Controller, Dyestuffs Control, Board of Trade.
- Sir Ernest William Elsmie Holderness, Bt., Assistant Secretary, Home Office.
- Captain John Murray Rymer-Jones, OBE, MC, Commander, Metropolitan Police.
- Norman Harry Jones, HM Deputy Chief Inspector of Factories, Ministry of Labour and National Service.
- Kenneth Ivor Julian, chairman, South-East Metropolitan Regional Hospital Board.
- Eric Philipps Keely, Assistant Secretary, Ministry of Food.
- Alderman Charles Robert Keene, JP. For political and public services in Leicestershire.
- Clifford Roy Kerwood, Assistant Secretary, Ministry of Health.
- Franklin Kidd, DSc, FRS, Director of Food Investigation, Department of Scientific and Industrial Research.
- Cecil John Kirk, Assistant Secretary, Air Ministry.
- Alfred John Knowlden, FSAA, lately Director of Audit, Exchequer and Audit Department.
- Arthur Richard Knowles, OBE, FCIS, Secretary-General, Association of British Chambers of Commerce.
- Joseph Latham, ACA, Director-General of Finance, National Coal Board.
- Henry Lesser, OBE, chairman, London Executive Council, National Health Service.
- Ernest Clifford Lloyd, MRCVS, Deputy Chief Veterinary Officer, Ministry of Agriculture and Fisheries.
- Major George Michael Long, OBE, DL, Secretary, Territorial and Auxiliary Forces Association of the County of Durham.
- Maurice Henry Lovell, Director, Overseas Press Services, Central Office of Information.
- Alderman Alfred Browning Lyne, JP, Vice-chairman, Cornwall County Council.
- James McCaig, OBE, Assistant Secretary, Ministry of Civil Aviation.
- Patrick McCarthy, Director, Paper Makers Association.
- James McFadyen McNeill, MC, LLD, FRS, managing director, John Brown and Company, Ltd., Glasgow.
- Ida Caroline Mann, MB, BS, DSc, FRCS, (Mrs. Gye), Senior Surgeon, Royal London Ophthalmic (Moorfields) Hospital.
- Cecil James Miles, MBE, Assistant Secretary, General Post Office.
- Charles Archer Morrison, OBE, FRICS, Chief Surveyor, Ministry of Works.
- John Morrison, OBE, Director and Shipyard Manager, Harland & Wolff, Ltd., Belfast.
- James Watson Munro, DSc, Professor of Zoology and Applied Entomology at the Imperial college of Science and Technology, University of London.
- Ernest Alexander Nicoll, MDS, ChB, FRCS, Surgeon-in-Charge, Berry Hill Hall Miners' Rehabilitation Centre and Consulting Surgeon to the Miners' Welfare Commission.
- Percy George Norman, OBE, Joint Honorary Treasurer, National Council of the Young Men's Christian Associations.
- Frank Morgan Owner, MSc, FRAeS, Chief Engineer, Engine Division, Bristol Aeroplane Company, Ltd.
- Alexander Wilfrid Oyler, OBE, JP, lately, Chairman of the London Youth Committee, London County Council.
- Henry Michael Denne Parker, Assistant Secretary, Ministry of Labour and National Service.
- Basil Eric Payne, lately Director of Canned Fruit and Vegetables, Ministry of Food.
- Herbert Quin, FCA, chairman, Belfast Hospital Management Committee.
- Frederick Tavinor Rees, MC, TD, MRCS, LRCP, Director-General of Medical Services, Ministry of Pensions.
- Alfred Road, Deputy Chief Inspector of Taxes, Board of Inland Revenue.
- Alfred Roberts, OBE, JP, Secretary, Amalgamated Association of Card, Blowing and Ringroom Operatives.
- Henry Russell, lately Director of Aluminium House Production, Ministry of Supply.
- Leslie George Semple, MIEE, lately Controller-General, Posts and Telecommunications, Control Commission for Germany, British Element, (now Regional Director, North Eastern Region, General Post Office).
- Donald McIntyre Sinclair, MIMechE, MInstT, General Manager, Birmingham and Midland Motor Omnibus Company, Ltd.
- Franklin Marwood Sleeman, Director, M.T. Sleeman and Sons, Ltd., Building Contractors, Exeter.
- Lieutenant-Colonel Henry Benson Somerville, OBE, MIEE, Regional Director, Northern Ireland Region, General Post Office.
- Kelvin Tallent Spencer, MC, FRAeS, AMICE, deputy director, Aircraft Research and Development (Technical) Ministry of Supply.
- Stanley Spencer, Painter.
- William Henry Stokes, chairman, Midland Regional Board for Industry.
- Alderman Reginald James Stranger, MC. For public services in Southampton.
- Lionel Tertis, FRAM. For services to Music, particularly in relation to the viola.
- Lieutenant-Colonel Charles William Thomas, TD, chairman, E. J. and J. Pearson, Ltd., Stourbridge.
- Hubert Charles Meysey-Thompson, Lord Chancellor's Legal Visitor in Lunacy.
- Herbert Trevor Tracey, Chief Publicity Officer, Trades Union Congress.
- Herbert Gordon Turner, FICS, Honorary Shipping Adviser to the Ministry of Food.
- Professor Arthur Mannering Tyndall, DSc, FRS, chairman, National Physical Laboratory Executive Committee.
- Henry Ernest Weston, Assistant Secretary, Ministry of Education.
- Wilfrid Whiteley. For political and public services, in Yorkshire.
- Herbert Oscar Wigg, OBE, Director of Accounts and Audit, Ministry of Labour and National Service.
- Alfred Wilson, General Secretary, Mercantile Marine Service Association.
- Captain (S) Dennis Austin Wilson, OBE, Royal Navy (Retired), Employed in a Department of the Foreign Office.
- John Wilson, Marine Superintendent, Shaw Savill and Albion Company, Ltd.
- Edgar Hugh Truman Wiltshire, Assistant Secretary, Ministry of Town and Country Planning.
- Donald Wolfit, Actor-Manager.
- Sidney Joseph Wood, Principal Inspector of Taxes, Board of Inland Revenue.
- Eric Armar Vully de Candole, Chief Administrator, Cyrenaica.
- John Eric Maclean Carvell, His Majesty's Envoy Extraordinary and Minister Plenipotentiary at Quito.
- Alexander Narraway Duckham, OBE, Agricultural Attaché at His Majesty's Embassy in Washington.
- Graham Dudley Lampen, lately Governor, Darfur Province, Sudan.
- Wilfred Pryor, British subject resident in China.
- Donald Victor Staines, OBE, Inspector of His Majesty's Foreign Service Establishments.
- Arthur Harry Tandy, Counsellor (Commercial) at His Majesty's Embassy hi Brussels.
- Hector Hercules Bell, chairman, Melbourne and Metropolitan Tramways Board, State of Victoria, 1936–1949.
- Walter Gerard Brind, OBE, DFC, lately Director of Public Works, Bechuanaland Protectorate.
- Walter John Spafford, ISO, lately Director of Agriculture, State of South Australia.
- Mehmed Aziz, MBE, ARSanI, Executive Officer, Anopheles Eradication Scheme, Cyprus.
- Clifford Viney Braimbridge, MVO, MB, BChir, FRCS Ed., LRCP, Colonial Medical Service, Senior Surgical Specialist, Kenya.
- Charles Ernest Donovan, Colonial Education Service, Director of Education, Sierra Leone.
- Edmund Victor Fowler, Colonial Police Service, Deputy Commissioner of Police, Singapore.
- Andrew Charles Hands, Colonial Audit Service, Director of Audit, Nigeria.
- The Most Reverend William George Hardie, DD, Archbishop of the West Indies.
- Professor Frederick Hardy, Imperial College of Tropical Agriculture, Trinidad.
- Cedric Harvey, Colonial Agricultural Service, Director of Agriculture, Fiji.
- Frederick Thomas Holden. For public services in Kenya.
- William Arthur Orrett, Colonial Police Service, Commissioner of Police and Commandant of Local Forces, British Guiana.
- Thomas Richmond Rowell, Colonial Education Service, Director of Education, Hong Kong.
- Ernest Emmanuel Clough Thuraisingham. For public services in the Federation of Malaya.

==== Officers of the Order of the British Empire (OBE) ====
Military Division

Royal Navy

- The Reverend Frederick Darrell Bunt, MA, Chaplain.
- Commander (E) (Acting Captain (E)) Arthur Beauclerk Coventry, DSC.
- Instructor Commander Edgar Ronald Dawson.
- Surgeon Commander Alfred Edward Flannery, LRCP&S.
- Commander (S) Arthur Alexander Loveridge.
- Temporary Commander (Sp.) Clement Proctor Lowe, Royal Naval Volunteer Reserve.
- Commander Geoffrey Wilson Mott, (Retired).
- Lieutenant-Colonel James Louis Moulton, DSO, Royal Marines.
- Commander John Pringle.
- Engineer Commander Charles George Guy Sindery, MIMechE, (Retired).
- Commander (L) Edward Walter Smith, DSC.
- Commander John Valentine Waterhouse, DSO.

Army

- Lieutenant-Colonel Henry Allan Bateson (20768), The South Lancashire Regiment (The Prince of Wales's Volunteers).
- Lieutenant-Colonel Arthur de Graves Best (12251), Corps of Royal Engineers.
- Lieutenant-Colonel Thomas Lindsay Binney (31875), The Cameronians (Scottish Rifles).
- Lieutenant-Colonel (acting) Eric George Boothroyd (69694), General List, Territorial Army, Queen Mary's Grammar School, Combined Cadet Force.
- Lieutenant-Colonel (temporary) John Desmond Cavendish Brownlow (52561), Grenadier Guards.
- Lieutenant-Colonel (now Colonel (temporary)) Donald Carmichael, MSc (Eng.), AMIMechE (63648), Royal Electrical and Mechanical Engineers.
- Lieutenant-Colonel (temporary) Noblett Carter (40361), Royal Regiment of Artillery.
- Lieutenant-Colonel Roscoe Clayton (20470), Corps of Royal Engineers.
- Lieutenant-Colonel (temporary) Harold Percy Combe (20130), The Queen's Royal Regiment (West Surrey).
- Lieutenant-Colonel (temporary) Rupert Crowdy Crowdy (51288), Royal Army Service Corps.
- Lieutenant-Colonel David Peter Davidson, MC, TD, (45010), Royal Artillery, Territorial Army.
- Lieutenant-Colonel (temporary) George Edward Davison, MBE, (122584), Royal Pioneer Corps.
- Lieutenant-Colonel (temporary) John George Figgess (101881), Intelligence Corps.
- Lieutenant-Colonel (Quarter-Master) Francis Henry Giles, MBE, (65938), Royal Army Service Corps.
- Lieutenant-Colonel (now Colonel (temporary)) Hugh Desmond Barre Goldie, MC, (35416), The Royal Scots Fusiliers.
- Lieutenant-Colonel (temporary) Arthur Ernest Green, DSO, (41130), The Middlesex Regiment.
- Lieutenant-Colonel (now Colonel (temporary)) James Durham Haigh, MA, AMIEE, (42245), Royal Corps of Signals.
- Lieutenant-Colonel (temporary) Allan Winfred Henderson (15885), Royal Regiment of Artillery.
- Lieutenant-Colonel (temporary) Colin Charles Hillman (164084), Royal Army Ordnance Corps.
- Lieutenant-Colonel (temporary) John Huntley Hooper (37073), Royal Regiment of Artillery.
- Lieutenant-Colonel (temporary) (now Major) Francis Fletcher Laugher, MC, (47616), The Dorsetshire Regiment.
- Lieutenant-Colonel Robert Cecil Laurence, TD, (21085), Royal Artillery, Territorial Army.
- Lieutenant-Colonel (temporary) Richard Frank Desmond Legh (50813), Royal Regiment of Artillery.
- Lieutenant-Colonel (temporary) Charles Baillie Mackenzie, DSO, (44938), The Queen's Own Cameron Highlanders.
- Lieutenant-Colonel (temporary) Godfrey Otto Bernard Marc (153707), Royal Army Ordnance Corps.
- Lieutenant-Colonel Ronald King McMichael, TD, (23725), The Northamptonshire Regiment, Territorial Army.
- Lieutenant-Colonel (acting) Edward Bertram Michaelis (2321), Territorial Army Reserve of Officers, Special List, Army Cadet Force.
- Lieutenant-Colonel (temporary) Gerald Mill Oborn (49772), The South Lancashire Regiment (The Prince of Wales's Volunteers).
- Lieutenant-Colonel (now Colonel (temporary)) Ralph Henry Lefroy Oulton (30694), The Royal Lincolnshire Regiment.
- Lieutenant-Colonel Richard Byng Pembroke (30910), Employed List, late Coldstream Guards.
- Lieutenant-Colonel Paul Postlethwaite (31591), Corps of Royal Engineers.
- Lieutenant-Colonel (temporary) David Lewellin Rhys, MC, (44951), The South Wales Borderers.
- Lieutenant-Colonel (temporary) Asheton Thomas Sladen (40411), Royal Corps of Signals.
- Lieutenant-Colonel (temporary) Chisholm Edward Hugh Sparrow, MC, BA, (39125), Corps of Royal Engineers.
- Lieutenant-Colonel (acting) John James Gordon Walkinton (28983), Territorial Army Reserve of Officers, Special List, Army Cadet Force.
- Lieutenant-Colonel (temporary) (now Major (Quarter-Master)) Arthur Edward White (125119), 4th Queen's Own Hussars, Royal Armoured Corps.
- Lieutenant-Colonel (temporary) Humphrey Pigot Williams (38776), The Buffs (Royal East Kent Regiment).
- Lieutenant-Colonel Reginald William Walls, Southern Rhodesia Military Forces.
- Brigadier (local) Carol Ardern (15616), Royal Regiment of Artillery, Officer Commanding Troops, Bermuda.

Royal Air Force

- Group Officer Mary Henrietta Barnett, Women's Royal Air Force.
- Group Captain Joseph Cox, DFC.
- Acting Group Captain Arnold Wall.
- Wing Commander Otto Maxwell Berkeley (72319).
- Wing Commander Reginald Henry Clifford Burwell, DFC, (40602).
- Wing Commander Edward George Clarke (35345).
- Wing Commander George Augustus Erskine Harkness, AFC, (27057).
- Wing Commander Frederick Charles Hornsby-Smith (74901).
- Wing Commander Walter Kerswell (44087).
- Wing Commander James Lambie (21158).
- Wing Commander Peter Alan McWhannell (34024).
- Wing Commander Harold John Maguire, DSO, (34048).
- Wing Commander Alastair Dyson Panton, DFC, (33331).
- Wing Commander Thomas William Piper, AFC, (37913).
- Wing Commander Bryan Samson (34249).
- Wing Commander Cyril Victor Stammers, MBE, (44985).
- Wing Commander Leopold Herbert Stewart (13230).
- Acting Wing Commander Alan Hartley (64049), Royal Air Force Volunteer Reserve.
- Acting Wing Commander William John Marshall, MBE, (43454).
- Acting Wing Commander John Belmont Taylor (72177).
- Principal Matron Margaret Ellen Garnett, RRC, (5019), Princess Mary's Royal Air Force Nursing Service (Retired).

Civil Division

- James William Acheson, ACIS, ACCA, Principal Auditor, Exchequer and Audit Department, Northern Ireland.
- Henry Richard Ahrens, Manager, Sociedad Anonima, Frigorifico Anglo, Buenos Aires.
- Alexander Forbes Anderson, Headmaster, County Modern School, Stowmarket.
- Percy Joseph Bacon, Chief Examiner, Board of Inland Revenue.
- Ernest Alfred Bates, MBE, Inspector of Rates, Rating of Government Property Department.
- Lieutenant-Colonel John Forbes Batten, MC, Director, Overseas Service, Soldiers' Sailors' and Airmen's Families Association.
- Reginald Percy Batty, assistant director, Meteorological Office, Air Ministry.
- Reginald Pridham Baulkwill, Chief Administrative Officer, Office of the Public Trustee.
- Edward Stuart Augustus Baynes, United Kingdom Trade Commissioner, Dublin.
- George Beardsworth, JP, Chief Organising Officer, Union of Shop, Distributive and Allied Workers.
- Ivon Christopher Beardwell, Member of the Board and lately chairman, National Egg Distributors Association, Ltd.
- William Dawson Beatty, MICE, lately Assistant Civil Engineer-in-Chief, Admiralty.
- Arnold Binns, Principal, Ministry of Fuel and Power.
- George Frederick Boswell, Chief Engineer Officer, SS Adrastus, Alfred Holt and Company.
- Edgar Scott Bowes, MRCS, LRCP, chairman, Poole Centre, St. John Ambulance Association.
- Edward Gregorius Brown, MBE, Senior Control Officer, Control Commission for Germany, British Element.
- Frank Halliwell Bygott, Chief Superintendent of Examinations, Civil Service Commission.
- Hugh Hill Campbell, JP, chairman, Ayrshire County Committee, Air Training Corps.
- William Gilbert Campbell, Superintending Naval Stone Officer, HM Dockyard, Devonport.
- Frederick James Carr, JP, Member, Licensing Authority for Public Service Vehicles, Northern Traffic Area.
- Hilda Champ, lately Principal, Ministry of Town and Country Planning.
- Francis John Chapple, DSO, MBE, MInstT, General Manager, Bristol Tramways and Carriage Company, Ltd.
- Frederick James Chittenden. For services to horticultural education.
- Alexander Lane Clark, DL, Member, County Londonderry Committee of Agriculture.
- Harold George Clarke. For services to the printing and newspaper industry.
- Richard Milroy Clarkson, Assistant Chief Engineer (Aircraft) and Chief of Aerodynamics Department, De Havilland Aircraft Company, Ltd.
- Ernest Thomas Conybeare, MD, FRCP, Medical Officer, Ministry of Health.
- Charles Frederick Cook, Director of Sun Printers, Ltd., Watford.
- Frederick Arthur Copp, Deputy Regional Controller, Southern Regional Office, Ministry of Labour and National Service.
- William Courtenay, MM, ARAeS, Writer on aeronautical subjects.
- Joseph Christopher Cox, Secretary, Building Apprenticeship and Training Council.
- Lieutenant-Colonel Norman George Cox, MInstT, Controller of Transport, Allied Commission for Austria, British Element.
- Harold Thomas Cranfield, FRIC, Provincial Advisory Chemist (Soils), Ministry of Agriculture and Fisheries.
- Isaac William Cumberbatch, MIMinE, JP, Area General Manager, North Staffordshire Area, West Midlands Division, National Coal Board.
- Arthur George Curtis, Principal, Ministry of Transport.
- Percival Vaughan Davies, Assistant Keeper, First Class, Public Record Office.
- Samuel Dunlop, Secretary, Belfast Chamber of Trade.
- William Paisley Earsman, JP, Councillor, Edinburgh Corporation. For public services in Edinburgh.
- Edward Ellis, MIMarE, Joint Manager, Repairs Department, J. I. Thornycroft and Company, Ltd., Southampton.
- George Bertram Sainsbury Errington, AFRAeS, Chief Test Pilot, Airspeed, Ltd. Christchurch.
- Stanley William Evans, JP, chairman, Bristol Local Appeal Board and Reinstatement Committee, Ministry of Labour and National Service.
- David Ewan, Chief Engineer Officer, MS Sepia, Anglo-Saxon Petroleum Company, Ltd.
- Donald Edgar William Fish, Superintendent of Security, British Overseas Airways Corporation.
- Roland Fletcher, MICE, Borough Engineer and Surveyor, Smethwick.
- John Victor Foll, managing director, Muirhead and Company, Ltd., Beckenham, Kent.
- Andrew Gallagher, JP, DL. For public services in Strabane, County Tyrone.
- Philip Nicolle Gallichan, lately Jurat of the Royal Court of Jersey.
- William Galloway, Regional Finance Officer and Chief Accountant, General Post Office, Scotland.
- Charles Edward Gamon, FRIBA, JP. For political and public services in Kent.
- Tom Golding, AMIEE, Manager of Electrical Department, W. H. Allen, Sons and Company, Ltd., Bedford.
- Norman Walter Goodchild, Chief Constable, Wolverhampton Borough Police.
- Tom Goodey, DSc, FRS, Senior Principal Scientific Officer, Rothamsted Experimental Station.
- John Arthur Gregorson, lately assistant director of Ordnance Factories, Ministry of Supply.
- The Right Honourable John Frederic, Baron Gretton, chairman of the committee, Burton-on-Trent Unit, Sea Cadet Corps.
- Ezer Griffiths, DSc, FRS, Senior Principal Scientific Officer, Department of Scientific and Industrial Research.
- Captain William Alexander Haddock, Master, SS Fanad Head, G. Heyn and Sons, Ltd., Belfast.
- John Eric Hall, Principal, War Office.
- Captain Robert Simpson Hanson, MC, County Commandant, Ulster Special Constabulary.
- George Frederick Morris Harding. For services to Art in Northern Ireland.
- Benjamin Hargreaves, Chairman of the Blanket Manufacturers' Association.
- Gerald Ravenscourt Hayes, chief executive officer, Admiralty.
- Robert Wilson Hayes, Assistant Regional Controller, South Western Regional Office, Ministry of Labour and National Service.
- James William Henley, chairman, Grimsby and Scunthorpe War Pensions Committee.
- Harry Hepworth, DSc, FRIC, Delegate Managing Director, Imperial Chemical Pharmaceuticals, Ltd.
- Stanley Francis Hines, Superintendent, Ministry of Supply Factory, Salwick, Nr. Preston.
- Charles Edgar Hoare, Senior Executive Officer, Commonwealth Relations Office.
- Kenneth Holmes, ARCA, Principal, Leicester College of Art.
- Frederick Hood, Director, Ministry of Pensions.
- William Wood Horn, JP, Alderman, St. Ives Borough Council, Huntingdonshire.
- Mary Ida Dorothy Houstoun, JP, Regional Administrator, Northern Region, Women's Voluntary Services.
- Douglas Walter Howard, MC, Director of Disposals, Ministry of Supply.
- John William Howlett, Vice-chairman, Southern Regional Board for Industry.
- Arthur Daniel Jaffé, Honorary Secretary-General, International Law Association.
- George James Horatio Jeffs, MVO, Divisional Air Traffic Control Officer, Ministry of Civil Aviation.
- Charles Herbert Jenkins, FRICS, Superintending Valuer, Wales, Board of Inland Revenue.
- Edgar Jenkins, Principal, Ministry of National Insurance.
- Ritchie Herbert Douglas Johns, Deputy Command Secretary, Western Command, War Office.
- Richard Vincent Johnson, Honorary Secretary, Caernarvonshire Branch, Forces Help Society.
- Alderman Alfred Jones, JP. For political and public services in Lancashire.
- Harold Compton Jones, MIEE, Telephone Manager, Liverpool, General Post Office.
- Thomas Gordon Jones, MBE, Principal, Ministry of Transport.
- Thomas Hughes Jones, Waterguard Superintendent, Southampton, Board of Customs and Excise.
- William John Kearns, Regional Controller, North-Western Region, National Assistance Board.
- Walter Monckton Keesey, MC, ARCA, ARIBA, lately HM Inspector of Schools, Ministry of Education.
- Elizabeth Alletta Clark-Kennedy, MBE, Educational Supervisor, Central Midwives Board.
- James Kirkland, MA, Headmaster, Shawlands Senior Secondary School, Glasgow.
- Arthur William Knee, Principal, Ministry, of Agriculture and Fisheries.
- Janet Isabel Laidlaw, Director, Y.W.C.A. Services, British Army of the Rhine.
- Mary Laird, Matron, Hairmyres Hospital, East Kilbride.
- Francis John Lane, MSc, MIEE, Transmission Design Engineer, British Electricity Authority.
- Alderman Frederick Charles Langton, National President, Amalgamated Society of Leather Workers and Kindred Trades.
- John Charles Lawder, JP. For political and public services in Stepney.
- Claude Kingston Legg, Director of Establishments and Organisation, HM Stationery Office.
- Leopold Leighton, MICE, MIMechE, lately Engineer-in-Chief, Mersey Docks and Harbour Board.
- Colonel Bertie Taylor Lloyd, MC, JP, DL, chairman, Cardiganshire Local Employment Committee and Aberystwyth Disablement Advisory Committee.
- Harold John Lloyd, Secretary, Agricultural Engineers Association.
- William John Kynaston Lloyd, AMICE, Regional Director of Opencast Goal Production, North Midland Region, Ministry of Fuel and Power.
- William McCarthy, chief executive officer, Ministry of National Insurance.
- James Albert Newlyn McEwan, Principal Control Officer, Control Commission for Germany, British Element.
- Cecil McFetrich, ACA, chairman, Sunderland Savings Committee.
- Joseph Francis McGlennon, Principal, Air Ministry.
- Thomas Pearson McIntosh, PhD, Director of the Seed Testing, Plant Registration and Plant Pathology Station, Department of Agriculture for Scotland.
- Jenny Mack, HM Inspector of Schools, Ministry of Education.
- Thomas Jardine Mackenzie, Principal Scottish Education Department.
- Daniel Morris McLauchlan, Chief Constable, Coatbridge Burgh Police, Lanarkshire.
- George Vert Thomson McMichael, MB, ChB, Medical Officer of Health for the Burgh of Paisley.
- Douglas Magub, Senior Cinque Ports Pilot, Trinity House Pilotage Service.
- Alfred Edward Mallett, Secretary, English Herring Catchers Association.
- Robert Marshall, General Secretary, St. Andrew's Ambulance Association.
- Walter Douglas Mathieson, MC. For services as Secretary of the Boundary Commissions for England and Wales. Principal, Registrar-General's Office.
- Richard Tudor Millward, MBE, Inspector of Audit, National Insurance Audit Department.
- Olive Eleanor Monkhouse, MBE. For services to Bedford College for Women, University of London.
- David Gwilym Morgan, MRCS, LRCP, Administrative Medical Officer, United Cardiff (Teaching) Hospitals.
- Gilbert Walter Morgan, PhD, Employed in a Department of the Foreign Office.
- Henry Thomas Morgan, MBE, Honorary Secretary, Bristol Savings Committee.
- Professor Edith Julia Morley, JP, Honorary Secretary, Reading and District Refugee Society.
- Arthur Netherwood, Chief Officer, Croydon Fire Brigade.
- Alexander Hodge Nisbet, GM, MBE, Firemaster, Lanarkshire Fire Brigade.
- Horace James Oram, MBE, Principal, HM Treasury.
- Herbert Deny Osborn, Senior Inspector of Taxes, Board of Inland Revenue.
- Owen John Owen. For public services in the Welsh Border Counties.
- Alderman Mary Madeline Paterson, JP. For public services in Paddington.
- Brigadier Norman Fredric Patterson, TD, Industrial Member of the Welsh Board for Industry.
- Charles Alfred William Pearce. For political and public services in Gloucestershire.
- James George Pearce, MSc, MIMechE, MIEE, FInstP, Director, British Cast Iron Research Association.
- James Reginald Pearson, MIMechE, Director and Factory Manager, Vauxhall Motors, Ltd., Luton.
- Harold Ernest Peirce, JP, chairman, Ballast, Sand and Allied Trades Association.
- Alderman Juanita Maxwell Phillips, JP. For public services in Honiton and district.
- James Anderson Piggot, JP, chairman, North West Hospital Management Committee, Northern Ireland.
- James William Richard Porter, FRICS, Assistant Valuer, Housing Management Division, London County Council.
- Harry Price, JP. For political and public services in Lancashire.
- Roger Charles Pugh, Airport Manager, London Airport, Ministry of Civil Aviation.
- John Ramsay, Assistant County Commissioner of the County of London Boy Scouts.
- James Rankin, FCIS, chairman, East Denbighshire Industrial Savings Council.
- Charles Frederick George Ransom, Grade I Assistant, attached to the Research Department of the Foreign Office.
- Maurice Leslie Rayner, Principal, Ministry of Labour and National Service.
- Bertie Lees Read, ACA, Clerk to the Governors, Guy's Hospital.
- John Edwin Richardson, Engineering Manager, Vickers Armstrongs, Ltd., Barrow-in-Furness.
- Frederic Frank John Bailey Roberts, Director, British Basic Slag, Ltd.
- Sydney Roberts, Area Milk Products Distribution Officer, North Western Division, Ministry of Food.
- Alderman Miss Florence Rollo, JP. For public services in Lancashire.
- Alderman George Saxon, JP. For political and public services in Cheshire.
- Edward Walter Alfred Scarlett, Principal, Colonial Office.
- William Henry James Sealy, assistant director for-Wales, Ministry of Works.
- Ralph Sheldon, Deputy Commander, Metropolitan Police.
- Frank Settles Siddall, MBE, Principal, Board of Customs and Excise.
- Helen Mary Simpson, Principal, Exhall Training College, Coventry.
- Philip Smiles, MBE, Member of the Ulster Savings Committee.
- Alexander Alec-Smith, lately Area Officer, Hull, Timber Control, Board of Trade.
- Edmund Hill-Snook, Divisional Food Officer, South Wales, Ministry of Food.
- Duncan McCallum Stewart, Member, Central Agricultural Executive Committee, Stirling, Clackmannan and West Perth.
- Stanley George Blaxland Stubbs, MBE, Assembly Member for Mid-Surrey National Savings Committee.
- Captain Frederick Tate, MM, Master, SS Bellerby, Sir R. Ropner and Company, Ltd.
- Frank Taylor, chief executive officer, Board of Trade.
- Alderman Arthur Henry Telling, MM, General Secretary, National Association of Operative Plasterers.
- John Alfred Theyer, Principal Officer, Bristol Channel District, Ministry of Transport.
- Herbert Gordon Thomas, ACA, Chief Accountant, Cable and Wireless, Ltd.
- James Joseph Thomasson, General Secretary, Amalgamated Union of Operative Bakers, Confectioners and Allied Workers of Great Britain and Ireland.
- Francis Raymond Thornton, HM Chief Inspector under the Dangerous Drugs Acts, Home Office.
- Reginald Frederick Torrington, Senior Local Army Welfare Officer for Manchester.
- Wilfred Turner, chairman, Bradford and District Advisory Committee, National Assistance Board.
- Eric Harold Underwood, lately Head of the German Information Department, Foreign Office:
- Alfred Thomas George Unitt, MIMechE, lately Motor Transport Officer (Class I), Engineering Department, General Post Office.
- Thomas Vose, Assistant Secretary, Welsh Board of Health.
- Lorna Calvert Watson, Principal, Department of Health for Scotland.
- Frederick Weller, Chief Officer (Administration), Commercial Department, Railway Executive.
- Percy Samuel James Welsford, FCIS, Secretary, The Library Association.
- George Johnson White, MBE, Grade II Officer, Foreign Office.
- Sidney Edward Whitehead, MICE, MIMechE, JP, deputy chairman, Southern Gas Board.
- Edwin Whitfield, Divisional Manager, British European Airways Corporation. For services to the Berlin Airlift.
- John Hargreaves Harley Williams, MD, Secretary General, National Association for the Prevention of Tuberculosis.
- Robert Hugh Wright, Principal Officer, Ministry of Home Affairs, Northern Ireland.
- William Bennett, British subject resident in the United States of America.
- Rex Walter Bosley, Second Secretary at His Majesty's Legation at Helsinki.
- Gerald Leo Carroll, British subject resident in Peru.
- Thomas Landale Christie, MC, lately Manager of the Chartered Bank of India, Australia and China at Saigon.
- Douglas Pavid Pedler Cracknell, Commissioner of Police, Somalia.
- James Currie, lately First Secretary (Commercial) at His Majesty's Embassy in Santiago.
- Albert Andrew Ernst Franklin, lately His Majesty's Consul at Tientsin.
- Bernard John Garnett, First Secretary (Commercial) at His Majesty's Embassy at Bangkok.
- Frederick Stollard Hardy, lately Deputy Director-General of Irrigation, Iraq Government.
- Joseph George Hart, Attaché at His Majesty's Legation at Beirut.
- William James Hawkings, British subject resident in China.
- Reginald Wiles Highwood, British Council Representative in Beirut.
- Captain Guy William Ogden, Director, Posts and Telegraphs Department Sudan Government.
- Thomas Buchan Stewart, British subject resident in the Argentine Republic.
- Thomas Speedie Mitchell Terrace, Ministry of Works' Director of Works and Services in the Far East.
- Ernest Ganz Wilson, lately Labour Adviser to the United Kingdom Liaison Mission in Japan.
- Alexander William Wallace Willoughby, His Majesty's Consul at Lille.
- Cyril Allen, a prominent journalist in Southern Rhodesia.
- Malcolm Munro Betten, chairman, Darjeeling Planters' Association, Bengal.
- Thomas Gregory Burnett, MB, ChB, chairman, Bulawayo Hospital Advisory, Committee, Southern Rhodesia.
- Frederick Charles Crawford, lately Town Clerk and Treasurer, Launceston, State of Tasmania.
- Olivia Gardener. For social welfare services in the State of Victoria.
- Gladys Lewis, Vice President, Young Women's Christian Association, State of Victoria.
- Dorothy Hope Lucas. For services rendered under the auspices of the Victoria League in connexion with hospitality to visitors to the United Kingdom from overseas.
- Mary Lynn, a Matron in charge of Mental Homes, State of Western Australia, for many years.
- Likely Herman McBrien, Member of the Legislative Council, State of Victoria, 1943–1949, and Secretary of the Victorian Football League.
- James Stuart McNeillie, of Southern Rhodesia, formerly President, Rhodesia Railways Workers' Union.
- Eileen Cicely Phillips, chairman of the executive committee of the Society for the Oversea Settlement of British Women.
- Andrew Small. For services in the State of South Australia, especially to Scottish societies and settlers from Scotland.
- Helen Wallis, MBE. For services rendered under the auspices of the Dominions Fellowship Trust in connexion with hospitality to visitors to the United Kingdom from overseas.
- Amy Ruth Wright, Headmistress, Perth Girls' School, State of Western Australia, since 1925.
- Henry Peter Zwar. For public services in the State of Victoria.
- Okunade Ajibade, LRCS, LRCP, LRFPS. For public services in Nigeria.
- Douglas Bailey. For public services in the Seychelles.
- Christopher Richard Vincent Bell, Colonial Education Service, Director of Education, Somaliland Protectorate.
- John Clarence Bryant. For public services in North Borneo:
- Francis Joseph Carasco. For public services in St. Lucia, Windward Islands.
- The Reverend Canon Devasahayam David Chelliah, PhD, Education Officer, Singapore.
- Barthelemy Jules Colin, Permanent Chairman of Conciliation Boards, Mauritius.
- William Southworth Cooper. For public services in Bermuda.
- Woolrich Harrison Courtenay. For public services in British Honduras.
- Marcus Harry French, Adviser, East African Hides, Tanning and Allied Industries Bureau.
- Jean Daniel Araauld Germond, MBE, Grade 1 Officer, Acting Resident Commissioner, British Solomon Islands Protectorate.
- Minnie Gosden, MB, BS, MRCS, LRCP, Colonial Medical Service, Senior Pathologist, Sierra Leone.
- Morrison Greenwood, MBE, Colonial Agricultural Service, Principal Agricultural Officer, Nigeria.
- Aubrey Victor Hall, Mayor of Blantyre Township. For public services in Nyasaland.
- Robert Alston Hammond, MRCVS, Colonial Veterinary Service, deputy director of Veterinary Services, Kenya.
- Geoffrey Hargreave. For public services in Jamaica.
- William Frederick Hayward, Colonial Postal Service, Postmaster-General, Fiji.
- Frank Bayliffe Henderson. For public services in British Guiana.
- Hubert Bedford Henville. For public services in the Leeward Islands.
- George Norman Herington, Colonial Education Service, Senior Rural Education Officer, Nigeria.
- Lister George Hopkins, Vital Statistics Officer, Development and Welfare, West Indies.
- Roy Adolphus Joseph, Mayor of San Fernando. For public services in Trinidad.
- Arthur William Hoyer Keen, AMIEE, Deputy Chief Mechanical Engineer, Crown Agents for the Colonies.
- The Right Reverend Bishop Francis Xavier Lacoursiere, Vicar Apostolic, Western Province, Uganda.
- Nicolas Panayi Lanitis. For public services in Cyprus.
- Lim Khye Seng. For public services in the Federation of Malaya.
- William Hubble Lindsay, AMIME, AMICE, deputy director of Public Works, Federation of Malaya.
- John Francis Lipscomb. For public services in Kenya.
- Charles Septimus Littlefair, Senior Superintendent of Police (Finance), Kenya.
- Lo Man-Wai. For public services in Hong Kong.
- Arthur Harold Morley, MB, ChB, FRCS (Ed.), LRCP, Colonial Medical Service, Surgical Specialist, Tanganyika.
- Valimohamed Mohamedali Nazerali. For public services in Tanganyika.
- Charles Elias Reindorf, MD. For public services in the Gold Coast.
- The Reverend Sylvester Milton Renner, DD. For public services in Sierra Leone.
- Henry Langdon Renwick, Colonial Customs Service, Comptroller of Customs, Zanzibar.
- Joseph Robson, Postmaster-General, Aden.
- John Ramsay Rycroft, Town Engineer, Lagos Town Council, Nigeria.
- Alfred Salomone, Manager, Water and Electricity Department, Malta.
- Edu William Agyl Bampon Sam, Deputy Registrar of Co-operative. Societies, Gold Coast.
- George William Somerville, Colonial Forest Service;, Conservator of Forests, Federation of Malaya.
- Reginald Taylor. For public services in Northern Rhodesia.

Honorary Officers

- Seiytd Salim bin Umar Mashhur, State Secretary in the Kathiri Government, Aden.
- Mustapha Albakri bin Haji Hassan, Officer of Class II, Malayan Civil Service, Federation of Malaya.

==== Members of the Order of the British Empire (MBE) ====
Military Division

Royal Navy

- Lieutenant (E) William Comstock, (Retired).
- Temporary Lieutenant-Commander Wilfred Samson Crocker, Royal Naval Volunteer Reserve.
- Lieutenant-Commander Sidney Edward Glover, DSC.
- Mr. Frederick William Charles Hall, DSC, Senior Commissioned Mechanician.
- Lieutenant-Commander Fred Jackson, Royal Naval Volunteer (Wireless) Reserve.
- Lieutenant (S) Vivian Edmund Jupp.
- Lieutenant Oliver Lascelles, DSC.
- Acting Lieutenant-Commander James Hunter Lyle.
- Lieutenant Archibald Graham McLachlan.
- Captain Alexander Wood Neaves, Royal Marines.
- Lieutenant-Commander (L) George Blackstock Strain.

Army

- Major Ralph Percy David Fortescue Allen (52052), 14th/20th King's Hussars, Royal Armoured Corps.
- No. 827625 Warrant Officer Class I Frederick Charles Bailey, Royal Regiment of Artillery.
- Captain (temporary) William Reginald Allen Bateman (310579), Royal Army Service Corps.
- Major (temporary) Joshua Birkett (128155), 1st King's Dragoon Guards, Royal Armoured Corps.
- Major Charles Arthur Boycott (66110), The Suffolk Regiment.
- Major (Quarter-Master) Randolph Edgar Dex Brasington, MC, (41730), The Gloucestershire Regiment.
- Major (temporary) Walter Cyril Bratt (259377), The Buffs (Royal East Kent Regiment).
- No. 7341528 Warrant Officer Class I (now Lieutenant Quarter-Master) Arthur James Britnell, Royal Army Medical Corps.
- Major Bevil Geoffrey Britton (66586), Coldstream Guards.
- No. 2044199 Warrant Officer Class II Victor James Alfred Britton, Royal Engineers, Territorial Army.
- Major (temporary) Arthur Broadley, TD, (16676), The Buffs (Royal East Kent Regiment).
- Captain (temporary) Thomas Nigel Bromage (354991), Grenadier Guards.
- No. 7259229 Warrant Officer Class I Lionel Henry Bryson, Royal Army Medical Corps.
- Major (temporary) Bernard Butler (259328), Royal Corps of Signals.
- No. T/37023 Warrant Officer Class II Malcolm James Arthur Campbell, Royal Army Service Corps, Territorial Army.
- No. T/33946 Warrant Officer Class I Charles Henry Carey, Royal Army Service Corps.
- Captain (Quarter-Master) Cyril Henry James Crowley (211159), Royal Army Service Corps.
- Major (temporary) Charles William Cullen (243925), Royal Army Service Corps.
- No. 2325516 Warrant Officer Class I Gerald Milliner Derwent, Royal Corps of Signals.
- Major Basil Nevill Leslie Ditmas (63419), Royal Regiment of Artillery.
- No. 405051 Warrant Officer Class I Edmund Dilworth, 1st King's Dragoon Guards, Royal Armoured Corps.
- The Reverend Hugh Dowd (125222), Chaplain to the Forces, Third Class (temporary), Royal Army Chaplains' Department.
- Major Bernard Peter Tyrwhitt-Drake, BA, (66052), Corps of Royal Engineers.
- Major Douglas Harley Duke (56662), The West Yorkshire Regiment (The Prince of Wales's Own).
- No. 2809272 Warrant Officer Class I (Bandmaster) Lawrence Norman Dunn, ARCM, The Cameronians (Scottish Rifles).
- Major (temporary) Harry Lyndon Emsley (66250), Royal Army Educational Corps.
- Major (temporary) Geoffrey Douglas Gill (88029), The Manchester Regiment.
- Major Maxwell Nalder Graham (69019), Royal Regiment of Artillery.
- Major Alexander John Stevenson Grant, TD, (23442), The Royal Sussex Regiment, Territorial Army.
- Major (temporary) Jack Guscott (252133), Royal Army Ordnance Corps.
- Major (temporary) Albert George Hance (163823), Corps of Royal Engineers.
- No. 7583504 Warrant Officer Class I Frederick Harris, Royal Army Ordnance Corps.
- Major (temporary) Richard Hill (104740), The Royal Fusiliers (City of London Regiment).
- Senior Commander (temporary) Ruby Hill (297978), Women's Royal Army Corps.
- Major (Quarter-Master) Charles Henry Hutchings (75091), late Corps of Royal Engineers (Extra Regimentally Employed List).
- Major Francis Royston Peathey-Johns, BSc (Eng.), AMIEE, (63015), Royal Electrical and Mechanical Engineers.
- Major (temporary) Jonah Jordon, MC, (117629), The Dorsetshire Regiment.
- No. 3053283 Warrant Officer Class I Benjamin Walker Kelly, The Queen's Own Cameron Highlanders.
- Major (Quarter-Master) Vincent Howard Lamb (91676), The South Staffordshire Regiment, Territorial Army.
- No. 6284948 Warrant Officer Class I Henry Leader, Royal Army Pay Corps.
- Captain (Quarter-Master) Christopher William John Lewis (266742), 1st The Royal Dragoons, Royal Armoured Corps.
- Major (acting) Norman Macleod Manson (286059), Territorial Army Reserve of Officers, Special List, Army Cadet Force.
- No. 5173264 Warrant Officer Class I (acting) Basil William Matthews, Army Physical Training Corps.
- Major Kenneth Stewart McGregor (34238), The Royal Leicestershire Regiment.
- Major Henry George Miller (123156), Royal Regiment of Artillery.
- Major (temporary) John Henry Moss (122458) Corps of Royal Engineers.
- No. 316655 Warrant Officer Class I Edwin John Nevitt, 5th Royal Inniskilling Dragoon Guards, Royal Armoured Corps.
- Major (temporary) Norman Harry Nicholson (124976), Royal Army Service Corps.
- No. 860747 Warrant Officer Class I Brian Edwin North, Royal Electrical and Mechanical Engineers.
- Major (temporary) John Oswald (167752), late Royal Regiment of Artillery (Extra Regimentally Employed List).
- Major (temporary) John Reginald Hall Parley (71110), The Devonshire Regiment.
- No. 899229 Warrant Officer Class II John Parr, Royal Regiment of Artillery.
- Major (acting) Charles William Pavey (223128), General List, Territorial Army, Kelly College Combined Cadet Force.
- Major Arthur Rowland (105968), The Queen's Bays (2nd Dragoon Guards), Royal Armoured Corps.
- Major (acting) George Barr Shields, MM, (283712), Territorial Army Reserve of Officers, Special List, Army Cadet Force.
- Major George Walter Simpson (173498), Royal Army Ordnance Corps.
- No. S/52308 Warrant Officer Class I Joseph John Smith, Royal Army Service Corps.
- Major (temporary) Stanley William Adolphus Snelling (292055), Royal Army Ordnance Corps.
- No. 3308467 Warrant Officer Class II Wilfred Sykes, Royal Army Service Corps, Territorial Army.
- Major (temporary) Arthur John Thather (188250), The Queen's Own Royal West Kent Regiment.
- Major Peile Thompson (53109), The Manchester Regiment.
- No. 827820 Warrant Officer Class I John Albert Troade, Royal Regiment of Artillery.
- No. 1406460 Warrant Officer Class II William Woozley Tyrrell, Royal Regiment of Artillery.
- Major (now Lieutenant-Colonel) (acting) Horace George Waldram, TD, (48717), General List, Territorial Army, Brentwood School Combined Cadet Force.
- Captain Arthur Gordon Ward (288577), Royal Artillery, Territorial Army.
- No. 6845799 Warrant Officer Class II George William Wastell, Corps of Royal Military Police.
- Major (Quarter-Master) Lionel John Williams (130693), The Buffs (Royal East Kent Regiment).

Royal Air Force

- Squadron Leader Arthur Bertie Jones, AFC, (43173).
- Squadron Leader Geoffrey Herbert Thomas (46562).
- Squadron Leader Alan Ridgard Towers (44296).
- Squadron Leader Sidney William Waller (31489).
- Acting Squadron Officer Eileen Joyce Borlase (5795), Women's Royal Air Force.
- Acting Squadron Leader Walter Morton Cookson, MIMun&CyE (199176).
- Acting Squadron Leader William James Greenslade (117768), Royal Air Force Volunteer Reserve.
- Acting Squadron Leader John Frederick Leonard Heard (64437), Royal Air Force Volunteer Reserve.
- Acting Squadron Leader Hugh Philip Hopkins, AFC, (44826).
- Acting Squadron Leader Lionel Harley Oates (111682).
- Acting Squadron Leader Cyril Thomas Phillips, DFC, (143413).
- Flight Lieutenant John Gillespie (160791).
- Flight Lieutenant George Harold Jarrett (51998).
- Flight Lieutenant Henry Norman Kitchin (45566).
- Flight Lieutenant Kenneth Charles Lounds (50702).
- Flight Officer Edith May Macgrigor (5882), Women's Royal Air Force.
- Flight Lieutenant Henry Peter Masse (110524).
- Flight Lieutenant Cyril George Minchinton, DFC, (84895).
- Flight Lieutenant William Graham Rogers, DFC, (118614).
- Acting Flight Lieutenant John Frederick Mayo Wright (91241), Royal Auxiliary Air Force.
- Warrant Officer Ernest Frederick Burford (524740).
- Warrant Officer Charles Frank Hadley (338188).
- Warrant Officer Sidney Handley (344995).
- Warrant Officer Hughie Jonathan Marker (335599).
- Warrant Officer Alfred William Harper (349692).
- Warrant Officer Ernest William Hornett (1860788).
- Warrant Officer Percy Masters Jacobs (349832).
- Warrant Officer Harold Francis Jones (505310).
- Warrant Officer George Rowland Neal (236887).
- Warrant Officer George Henry Randle (515353).
- Warrant Officer Alastair Ronald Stewart (590891).
- Warrant Officer Richard Carroll Thorp (537294).
- Warrant Officer Sidney Watson (510863).

Civil Division

- Stephen George Akhurst, JP. For political and public services in Brighton and Hove.
- Gilbert Horatio Aldred, Chief Engineer, British Ropes, Ltd., Doncaster.
- Alderman Bruce Alexander, JP, lately Local Army Welfare Officer, Kendal and South Westmorland.
- Agnes Frances Allan, County Director, British Red Cross Society, City of Dundee.
- Alexander Broadfoot Allan, Farmer. For services to farming in Kirkcudbrightshire.
- Annie Maud Allan, Headmistress, Littlehampton County Secondary School for Girls.
- James Anderson, Dockmaster, Methil, Fifeshire.
- Elsie Harriet Andrew, Executive Officer, Ministry of Fuel and Power.
- Margaret Clara Archard, Personal Assistant to the Regional Director, South Western Region, Ministry of Fuel and Power.
- Frederick Herbert Archer, Chief Superintendent, Metropolitan Police.
- Robert Armstrong, District Commandant, Ulster Special Constabulary.
- George Reginald Ashton, Local Fuel Overseer, Keynsham Urban District.
- Elsie Marianne Baker, Executive Officer, HM Treasury.
- Richard Siviter Baker, Production Manager, Adie Brothers, Ltd., Birmingham.
- Arthur William Ball. For public services in Stepney.
- Frank Augustus Ballard, Chief Machinist, Royal Opera House, Covent Garden.
- Ernest Victor Balsom, AMIMechE, Secretary, Institution of Sanitary Engineers.
- John Bamber, Accountant, Ministry of Fuel and Power.
- Donald Barlow, Chief Engineer, Bond Air Services, Ltd. For services in the Berlin Airlift.
- Douglas Clyde Barlow, Superintendent of Welfare Establishments, Middlesbrough County Borough.
- James Barrie, Principal Probation Officer, County of Fife and Burgh of Dunfermline.
- David Bayley, Valuation Clerk, Higher Grade, Board of Inland Revenue.
- Arthur William Bean, chairman, Horticultural Sub-Committee of the East Riding Agricultural Executive Committee.
- William Fitzgerald Beatty, AMICE, Assistant District Engineer, Railway Executive, Watford.
- Herbert Beckwith, Regional Establishment Officer, Birmingham, Ministry of Health.
- Harry Richard Bennett, Member, National Schools Savings Advisory Committee.
- Henry Oscar Wallace Bigg, ASAA, Honorary Secretary, Dagenham Savings Committee.
- Alexander William Black, County Organiser for Inverness, North of Scotland College of Agriculture.
- Samuel John Blair, Honorary Secretary, Portstewart and District Savings Committee, County Londonderry.
- Rosalia Marie d'Arnim Blumberg. For services to the North of England Children's Sanatorium, Southport.
- Daniel Boland, First Class Clerk, Supreme Court of Judicature.
- John Boss, Superintendent, Glasgow City Police.
- Mary Dorothy Boston, Grade 3 Officer, Ministry of Labour and National Service.
- James Edward Bothwell, Honorary Secretary and Treasurer, Aberdeenshire Branch, Forces Help Society.
- Harry Bowen, Secretary, British Pottery Manufacturers' Federation.
- Gladys Mary Bowerman, Assistant Divisional Nursing Officer, London County Council.
- Margaret Cicely Bowley, lately Dietetic Adviser to King Edward VII Hospital Fund for London.
- Clarence Eric Boxall, Factory Manager, I and R. Morley, Ltd., County Durham.
- Thomas Michael Brennan, Radio Officer, Flight Refuelling, Ltd., Wunstorf and Fuhlsbüttel. For services in the Berlin Airlift.
- Reginald Richard Walter Bridson, Manager, No. 1 Unit, Overseas Food Corporation, Kongwa, Tanganyika.
- Eva Johnson Broad, Senior Chief Clerk, Board of Customs and Excise.
- Francis Charles Brobyn, Senior Station Engineer, Flight Refuelling, Ltd., Wunstorf and Fuhlsbüttel. For services in the Berlin Airlift.
- John Edward Broomhead, Superintendent of Limeburning, Hindlow Works, Imperial Chemical Industries, Ltd.
- Alfred Sidney Brown, Manager of the Electric Department, Clarke Chapman and Company, Ltd., Gateshead.
- Alfred Stanley Brown, Skipper of the Steam Trawler Stalberg, Consolidated Fisheries, Ltd.
- Arthur Edwin Brown, AMIMechE, Assistant Engineer Inspector, Admiralty.
- Major Samuel Burkey, Regional Inspector, Imperial War Graves Commission.
- John Cahill, DCM, Senior Executive Officer, Home Office.
- William Lorraine Calder, Assistant Principal Clerk, Board of Inland Revenue.
- John Campbell, General Secretary, Scottish Slaters, Tilers, Roofers and Cement Workers Society.
- Albert Canter, Senior Office Clerk, House of Commons.
- Victor Carlisle, Senior Auditor, National Insurance Audit Department.
- Randle William Carr, ARICS, Senior Assistant Land Commissioner, Ministry of Agriculture and Fisheries.
- Adelaide Cartwright, Matron, Brockhall Institution for Mental Defectives, Langho, Lancashire.
- Henry George Milward Castell, attached to the Diplomatic Wireless Service, Foreign Office.
- Frank Archibald Cave, Senior Executive Officer, Ministry of Transport.
- Leonard Challenor, Honorary Treasurer, North-Western Area, British Legion.
- Herbert James Charlton, Headmaster, South Park Primary School, Ilford.
- Ernest Chicken, JP, Colliery Manager, Blackhall and Castle Eden Collieries, Northern Division of the National Coal Board.
- Harold Child, Assistant General Secretary, National Union of Tailors and Garment Workers.
- Norman Victor Church, Superintendent, Boundary Section, Ordnance Survey Department.
- James Clark, JP, lately Honorary Local Fuel Overseer, Borough of Camberwell.
- Albert Walter Wallis Clarke, Higher Clerical Officer, Ministry of Civil Aviation.
- Leonard Cyril Clarkson, Works Director, Raleigh Industries, Ltd., Nottingham.
- Alderman Richard Clift, JP, Vice-chairman, Staffordshire County Council.
- Charles Collier. For services to the Edgware Road Local Employment Committee.
- John Cooke, DCM, Senior Executive Officer, Ministry of Pensions.
- William George Copsey, Secretary, Institute of Certificated Grocers.
- William Maurice Samuel Cox, Assistant Regional Director, South West Region, Ministry of Works.
- Richard George Crickmay, Higher Executive Officer, Ministry of Pensions.
- Lizzie Marion Crittle, Senior Executive Officer, Ministry of Pensions.
- Leslie Thomas Crofts, Higher Executive Officer, Central Land Board and War Damage Commission.
- Gerald Edward Crouch, Chief Superintendent and Deputy Chief Constable, Brighton Borough Police.
- Grace Elaine Currey, Trustee-in-Charge, Royal Sailors' Rests, Portsmouth and Devonport.
- Ernest Cuttell, Secretary, Butter and Cheese Association, Ltd.
- Henry Herbert Davidson, District Inspector, Royal Ulster Constabulary.
- George Edmund Dearing, Member, Leicester Local Employment Committee.
- Elizabeth Denton, County Borough Organiser, Women's Voluntary Services, Liverpool.
- Elliot Brocklebank Dewberry, FRSanI, Sanitary Officer Grade I, Ministry of Works.
- James Hamilton Donald, Senior Executive Officer, Scottish Education Department.
- Hugh Dougal, JP. For services as a Prison Visitor in Belfast.
- Harry Frederick Dowler. For services to the Children's Hospital, Birmingham.
- Emily Mary Duggan, lately Assistant Secretary, Bureau of Hygiene and Tropical Diseases.
- Jean Elizabeth Dunlop, Sister in Charge, Chronic Sick Ward, Southern General Hospital, Glasgow.
- Charles William Dunnet, Honorary Secretary, Berwickshire Savings Committee.
- Philip Henry Durham, JP, lately Higher Clerical Officer, Department of Scientific and Industrial Research.
- Neil Gordon Edmondson, Actuary, Liverpool Savings Bank.
- Robert Edwards, chairman, Wrexham Rural District Food-Control Committee.
- Alderman William Ewart Ellis, chairman, Bideford Youth Employment Committee.
- Esther Annie Emery, chairman, Women's Sub-Committee of Widnes Local Employment Committee.
- Cecil Emmerson, Surveyor, Sunderland Rural District Council.
- Denis Michael Evans, lately Pilot, Skyways, Ltd., Wunstorf. For services in the Berlin Airlift.
- John David Eryl Evans, Senior Intelligence Officer, Control Commission for Germany. (British Element).
- Thomas Alfred Presgrove Feist, Higher Clerical Officer, Savings Department, General Post Office.
- Anne Dorothy, Countess of Feversham, County Organiser, Yorkshire, North Riding, Women's Voluntary Services.
- Lucy Field, Secretary, Association of Wholesale Distributors of Imported Poultry and Rabbits, Ltd.
- Alice Mary Sybil Wynne Finch, JP, lately Member, Denbigh Agricultural Executive Committee.
- James Frederick Flatman, Superintendent and Deputy, Chief Constable, Isle of Ely Constabulary.
- Olive Mary Forbes, Chief Superintendent of women employees, Ferranti, Ltd., Hollinwood.
- Elisabeth Shaw Brodie Forrest, Centre Organiser, Women's Voluntary Services, Rutherglen.
- Clarice Muriel Friday, Senior Executive Officer, Ministry of Health.
- Charles Douglas Frogbrook, Senior Executive Officer, Central Ordnance Depot, War Office.
- Robert Gordon Fryer, Senior Executive Officer, Ministry of National Insurance.
- Angela Galbally, Translator, attached to the Foreign Office.
- Stanley Garrett, Senior Executive Officer, Ministry of Supply.
- Reginald Gaved, District House Coal Officer, St. Austell, Cornwall.
- James George Gibson, Higher Executive Officer, Ministry of Transport.
- Raymond Gilbert, Senior Experimental Officer, Government Chemist's Department.
- Robert Watson Gillespie, Honorary Secretary, Lisnaskea and District Savings Committee, County Fermanagh.
- Stanley Robert Bygate Gillespie, JP, lately Technical Staff Officer, HM Stationery Office.
- Neil Gillies, Inspector of Quarries, Ministry of Fuel and Power.
- Doreen Maud Golding, Control Officer I, Control Commission for Germany, British Element.
- John Goldsbrough, MINA, Assistant to the Technical Director, Furness Shipbuilding Company, Ltd., Billingham.
- Vyvian Edwin Goodman, Commandant, Bedfordshire Special Constabulary.
- Joseph William Gothwaite, Assistant Quantity Surveyor, Imperial War Graves Commission.
- Agnes Gibb Gray, Statistician, South West Scotland Division, British Electricity Authority.
- Archibald Newbigging Grierson, Chief Draughtsman, David Rowan and Company, Ltd., Glasgow.
- Samuel Ewing Haire, lately Secretary, Londonderry and Gransha Hospital.
- Blodwen Hallett, Sister, Graig Hospital, Pontypridd, Glamorgan.
- Esther Maud Handford, Member, Loughborough Youth Employment! Committee.
- Captain James Augustus Hamer Harries, Commissioner, North Wales Region, National Savings Committee.
- David John Edward Harris, Chief Clerk, Office of the High Commissioner for the United Kingdom, Union of South Africa.
- Alfred Haselden, General Works Manager, Ford Motor Company Ltd., Dagenham.
- Frances Florence Hawker, Honorary Secretary, Newbury Division, Soldiers', Sailors' and Airmen's Families Association.
- Frank Basil Hawkins, Regional Welfare Officer, Eastern Region, Ministry of Labour and National Service.
- William Healey, JP, lately Member, West Sussex Agricultural Executive Committee.
- Harry Noble Heard, chairman, Camberwell War Pensions Committee.
- Leonard William Hedger, FCIS, Secretary, Royal Western Counties Hospital Group.
- Alexander Henderson, Assistant Chief Constable of Cheshire.
- Alexander Bremner Henderson, MA, Headmaster, Wick North Primary School.
- George Colin Henry, Pilot, Bond Air Services, Ltd., Fuhlsbüttel. For services in the Berlin Airlift.
- Arthur Joseph Hewitt, Superintendent of Gas Turbine. Aero Engine Development, Armstrong-Siddeley Motors, Ltd., Coventry.
- Constance Mabel Hickling, Personnel Manager, John Bright and Brothers, Ltd., Rochdale.
- Edgar Nathaniel Hiley, General-Secretary, National Brass Foundry Association.
- Thomas Frank Hiscock, Navigating Officer, Flight Refuelling, Ltd., Wunstorf and Fuhlsbüttel. For services in the Berlin Airlift.
- Jessie Elizabeth Hobbs, Sister, Male Medical Ward, Gravesend and North Kent Hospital.
- Sydney Arthur Hodges, MINA, Senior Ship Surveyor, Ministry of Transport.
- Alderman Herbert Laurence Hogg, JP, chairman, Hartlepool Sea Cadet Unit.
- Frederick Holmes, Tug Master, Traffic Department, North Eastern Waterways Division, Goole, Docks and Inland Waterways Executive.
- Doris Holoran, Technical Nursing Officer, Ministry of Labour and National Service.
- William Holroyd, Secretary, East and West Ridings Regional Board for Industry.
- Edwin Holt, JP. For public services in West Hendon.
- Thomas Hosking, Senior Experimental Officer, Admiralty.
- George Noel Howard, Staff Officer, Admiralty.
- Gordon Rushworth Howells, Chemist I, Atomic Energy (Production) Division, Ministry of Supply.
- Ernest Hoyle, Chief Draughtsman, Telecommunications Research Establishment, Ministry of Supply.
- Charles Henry Hubbard, Higher Executive Officer, Board of Trade.
- John Harold Hubbard, Executive Officer, Ministry of Health.
- Norman Hudson, Chief Commercial Officer, North Eastern Gas Board.
- Joseph Anthony Hunt, chairman, Birmingham Advisory Committee, Midland Regional Board for Industry.
- Alfred Reginald Chadwick Huntington, FCIS, chairman and managing director, William Champness and Sons, Ltd., Caernarvon.
- Stanley Edward Hutson, AMIMechE, Senior Experimental Officer, Armament Research Establishment, Ministry of Supply.
- Robert George Jackson. For services to the Belfast and Castlereagh Rural District Councils.
- Bernard Jacobs, Higher Executive Officer, Air Ministry.
- George Arthur Livesey Jaques, Senior Executive Officer, Air Ministry.
- William Altham Johnson, Control Officer I, Control Commission for Germany, British Element.
- Arthur Ifan Jones, JP, chairman, Anglesey Group Committee, Wales Gas Board.
- John Oswell Jones, Manager, Bradford Employment Exchange, Ministry of Labour and National Service.
- Olive Esdpn Courtney-Jones, Chaplain's Assistant, British Army of the Rhine.
- Walter Jones, Chief Steward, Alfred Holt and Company.
- Miriam Britland Jowett, Officer-in-Charge, Foreign Relations Work, British Red Cross Society, Berlin.
- Herbert Keeling, Production Manager, Job Wheway and Son, Ltd., Walsall.
- Captain William Houston Keenan. For services to ex-Servicemen in Bangor, County Down.
- Norman Kettlewell, Chief Officer, West Hartlepool Fire Brigade.
- David King, Chief Armament Designer, De Havilland Aircraft Company, Ltd.
- Nellie King, National Savings Assembly Member for North Wiltshire.
- Annie Phyllis Knox, lately Matron, Royal Belfast Hospital for Sick Children.
- Cyril Charles Lee, Marine Superintendent, Trinity House Service, Great Yarmouth.
- Mary Lidbury, lately Regional Clothing Officer, No. 3 (North Midlands) Region, Women's Voluntary Services.
- Isabel May Life, Commandant, British Red Cross Society, Isle of Wight.
- Marguerite Louise Limozin, Private Secretary to the Deputy Chairman (Operations), British Electricity Authority.
- Kenneth Bernard Ling, Superintendent, Standard Telephones and Cables, Ltd., Treforest.
- James Sheridan Little, Agricultural Machinery Inspector, Ministry of Agriculture and Fisheries.
- Horace Henry Livett, Higher Executive Officer, Ministry of Civil Aviation.
- Leonard George Livingstone, chief executive officer, Ministry of Education.
- Harry Jones Lloyd. For public services in Denbighshire.
- John Robert Lloyd, Superintendent of Records, Commonwealth Relations Office.
- Norah Henrietta Lonsdale, Staff Officer, Ministry of Commerce, Northern Ireland.
- Henry Estes Lynch, Deputy Principal Officer, Ministry of Finance, Northern Ireland.
- Geoffrey Ernest Derek MacBride, Control Officer I, Control Commission for Germany (British Element).
- John Macdonald, Higher Executive Officer, Department of Agriculture for Scotland.
- Henry McIlwaine, Chief Engineer Officer, SS Lord O'Neill, Ulster Steamship Company, Ltd.
- Charles Smith Brown McLarty, Factory Manager, Alexander, Fergusson and Company, Ltd., Glasgow.
- Alexander Duncan McLean, lately Head Postmaster, Canterbury, Kent.
- Archibald Maclean, Deputy Oil Production Officer, North Western Area, Oil and Fats Division, Ministry of Food.
- William Currie McNee, Works Manager, McCrae and Drew, Ltd:, Glasgow.
- Robert Valentine Macrory, MIEE, City Electrical Engineer, Londonderry.
- Captain Bryan Elidore Stacpoole Mahon, Supervising Inspector of Home Grown Cereals, Ministry of Food.
- Joseph Mandefield, lately Senior Executive Officer, Board of Trade.
- Allan Manson, Assistant General Secretary, National Union.of Seamen.
- James Fenton Marsden, Inspector Grade I, Board of Trade.
- Philip Marshall, Higher Executive Officer, Ministry, of National Insurance.
- Walter Henry Martin, Accountant, Ministry of Education.
- Thomas Martindale, Assistant Inspector of Naval Ordnance, Admiralty.
- William George Masters, Senior Technical Officer, Royal Mint.
- Ino Matthewman, Private Secretary to the Divisional Waterways Officer, North Eastern Division, Docks and Inland Waterways Executive.
- Herbert Langsford Matthews, Collector of Taxes, Higher Grade, Board of Inland Revenue.
- James Matthews, Secretary, Trade Union Side, National Joint Council for Civil Air Transport. National Industrial Officer, National Union of General and Municipal Workers.
- Edward Maughan, Purser and Chief Steward, Troop Transport Empire Windrush, New Zealand Shipping Company, Ltd.
- Richard Henry Porcher Meen, CA, Deputy Finance Director, Meat and Livestock Division, Ministry of Food.
- Frank Albert Mells, Senior Executive Officer, Ministry of Health.
- Ann Black Mennie, Higher Clerical Officer, Ministry of Transport.
- Walter George Cuthbert Miller, Higher Executive Officer, Air Ministry.
- Cecil Henry Milton, Inspector of Taxes, Higher Grade, Board of Inland Revenue.
- Archie Lane Mitchell. For public services in Tavistock.
- Edward Wilfred Monteith, Staff Officer, Ministry of Labour, and National Insurance, Northern Ireland.
- Eleanor Mary Morgan, Centre Organiser, Women's Voluntary Services, Dundee.
- William Moseley, Telephone Manager, Gloucester, General Post Office.
- Albert George Moss, Higher Clerical Officer, Admiralty.
- Frances Dorothy Mott, Executive Officer, Office of HM Procurator-General and Treasury Solicitor.
- Nina Frances Emmeline Mower, Clerical Officer, Ministry of National Insurance.
- Charles Alexander Munro, Senior Executive Officer, Central Office of Information.
- Bernard Murphy, DSC, lately Chief Engineer Officer, SS Annaghmore, John Kelly, Ltd.
- Frank Musselbrook, Higher Executive Officer, Home Office.
- Jameson Leonard Neill, Senior Executive Officer, National Assistance Board.
- Philip Alexander Nelson, Secretary and Technical Adviser, South Coast Engineering and Shipbuilding Employers' Association.
- Isabella Suttie Fairnie Ness, Domiciliary Midwife, Musselburgh Town Council.
- Idalia Julia Murlis Nicholls, Regional Transport Officer, No. 7 (South Western) Region, Women's Voluntary Services.
- Morris Lyndon Nicholls, Honorary Secretary, Fishguard, Royal National Lifeboat Institution.
- James Norman, AFRAeS, Chief Surveyor, Air Registration Board.
- Hetty Bottomley North, Higher Executive Officer, Ministry of Supply.
- James William Oliver, Headmaster, Cuckoo County Secondary School for Boys, Baling.
- Arthur Ernest Owler, Senior Executive Officer, Ministry of Works.
- Elsie Page, Regional Clothing Officer, No. 6 (Southern) Region, Women's Voluntary Services.
- Ernest Edward Page, Station Superintendent, Llanelly Power Station, South Wales Division, British Electricity Authority.
- John Dickson Panton, CA, lately Treasurer to Dundee Harbour Trustees.
- James Park, Member, Edinburgh Savings Committee.
- James Henry Parkinson, lately Manager, North Eastern Division of the National Coal Board.
- William Parry, Senior Engineer, British Overseas Airways Corporation. For services in the Berlin Airlift.
- Theodora Alberta Pars, Chief Superintendent of Typists, Home Office.
- Bert Parsons, Works Manager, Stephen Walters and Sons, Ltd., Silk Weavers, Sudbury, Suffolk.
- Captain Denis John Parsons, Pilot, Fairflight, Ltd., Wunstorf. For services in the Berlin Airlift.
- Hugh Patchett, chairman, Spen Valley Local Employment Committee.
- Noel Wyatt Paul, Farmer. For services to farming in Dorset.
- Leslie Richard Pears, TD, PhD, Member, School Harvest Camps Advisory Committee.
- Albert Pearson, Assistant Chief Constable, Bradford City Police.
- George Matthew Raymond Pearson, Secretary, Woollen and Worsted Trades' Federation.
- Allen John Perring, President of the Amateur Swimming Association.
- Arthur Hector Pettitt, Manager, Southampton Government Training Centre, Ministry of Labour and National Service.
- Archiman Pickard. For political and public services in Yorkshire.
- Emily Powell, BEM, Domiciliary Midwife, London County Council.
- Jessie Agnew Preston, County Secretary, Shropshire, Women's Land Army.
- Arthur John Crawford-Price, Assistant to the chairman, British Tourist and Holidays Board.
- Edmund Priestley, LRAM, Senior Music Adviser, West Riding County Council.
- Anthony Procter, AMIMechE, Manager, Oil Seal Department, George Angus and Company, Ltd.
- Allan Proctor, General Secretary, City of Hull Great War Trust.
- Robert Bannerman Rae, lately Executive Officer, Scottish Home Department.
- John Stanyon Ratcliffe, Housing and Estates Manager, Willesden Borough Council.
- James Ray, Higher Executive Officer, Board of Inland Revenue.
- Percival Montford Reckhouse, Senior Executive Officer, Board of Customs and Excise.
- Mabel Edith Redman, lately Matron, Luton and Dunstable Hospital, Bedfordshire.
- Leonard Maurice Reeves, Senior Trunk Road Engineer, East Suffolk County Council.
- Norman Renison, Vice-chairman, Coventry Savings Committee.
- Harry Reoch, Principal, Dundee Trades College.
- Agnes Leslie Richmond, Departmental Secretary, Scottish Trades Union Congress.
- Dora Alice Robinson, Higher Clerical Officer, Board of Trade.
- Stanley Gordon Robinson, Senior Executive Officer, Air Ministry.
- Lieutenant Commander Herbert John Rose, Royal Navy (Retired), lately Secretary, Portsmouth Branch, Naval Warrant Officers' Death Benefit Association.
- Captain Frederick Arthur Roughton. For services as Ship's Master, Marine Contractors, Ltd., Southampton.
- Ernest William Rowe, Clerical Officer, Aeroplane and Armament Experimental Establishment, Ministry of Supply, Boscombe Down, Wiltshire.
- Horace Sanders, ACCA, Actuary, Nottingham Trustee Savings Bank.
- Fanny Stella Saunders, Controller of Typists, Ministry of Agriculture and Fisheries.
- Ninian Hill Scarth, Manager, Engine Department, Yarrow and Company, Ltd., Glasgow.
- Captain Cyril Rayner Scate. For public services in the Isle of Man.
- Robert Schofield, Works Manager, Hugh Mackay and Company, Ltd., Durham.
- William Robert Scott, MIEE, chairman, Western District Committee, Scottish Board for Industry.
- Edith Alice Secker, Matron, Overdale Isolation Hospital, Jersey.
- Eric Sellman, JP, lately chairman, Wolverhampton Local Employment Committee and Disablement Advisory Committee.
- Mary Sergent, Honorary Secretary, Liverpool Street Groups Savings Committee.
- Edwin Shackley, Welfare Officer and Treasurer, Lakes and Lancaster Wing, Air Training Corps.
- John Emanuel Arthur Shearing, Divisional Police Superintendent, Railway Executive.
- William Sheepwash, Principal Foreman of Storehouses, Admiralty.
- Mary Isabel Lilias Sherbrooke, Officer II, Education Branch, Allied Commission for Austria, British Element.
- William John Shingfield, Member, Essex Agricultural Executive Committee.
- Walter Charles Shinn, Senior Executive Officer, Board of Trade.
- George William Shott, Higher Executive Officer, Foreign Office.
- Arthur George Sjogren, chairman, Bedfordshire District Committee, Eastern Regional Board for Industry.
- Elizabeth Staples Smellie, County Superintendent for Essex, St. John Ambulance Brigade.
- Andrew Stuart Lees Smith, Senior Executive Officer, General Post Office.
- Edward Duncanson Lindsay Smith, Superintendent, City of Glasgow Remand Home.
- Wing Commander Edward Montague Smith, Employed in a Department of the Foreign Office.
- James Alexander Smith, Superintendent, Lambton Street Boys' Fellowship Centre, Sunderland.
- Olive Mary Sparks, District Nurse and Midwife, Sutton and Glusburn, Yorkshire.
- James Spence. For public services in County Antrim.
- Mary Stanley, County Borough Organiser, Women's Voluntary Services, Burton-on-Trent.
- Harold William Steele, Higher Executive Officer, Ministry of Transport.
- Captain Hilmar John Stenwick, DSC, lately Master, SS Merton, R. Chapman and Son.
- Herbert Charles Stevens, Heavy Forge Manager, William Jessop and Sons, Ltd., Sheffield.
- James Barr Stevenson, Works Director, E.M.I. Factories, Ltd., Hayes, Middlesex.
- Horatio Nelson Taylor, Registrar and Archivist, Office of the High Commissioner for the United Kingdom, New Delhi.
- Joseph Taylor, Dockmaster, Cammell Laird and Company, Ltd., Birkenhead.
- Alexander Frederic Aimé Imbert-Terry, Clerical Officer, Board of Trade.
- Captain Frederick Theobald, Local Army Welfare Officer, Metropolitan Kent.
- John Thexton, Executive Officer, War Office.
- Jennie Thomas, JP, County Organiser of Language Training and Infant Schools, Caernarvonshire.
- Observer Commander John Neill Thompson, Commandant, No. 19 (Surrey and West Kent) Group, Royal Observer Corps.
- Hatton Henry Ewart Timmis, FRICS, Assistant Regional Planning Officer, Ministry of Town and Country Planning.
- Richard Harold Timmis, Member, Alsger Urban District Council, Stoke on Trout.
- Henry Ian Herick Titchener, Senior Executive Officer, Colonial Office.
- Gladys May Troak, Executive Officer, Ministry of Civil Aviation.
- John Henry Trower, ACA, Honorary Secretary, Newcastle upon Tyne Savings Committee.
- William Turnbull, Chief Engineering Officer, SS Parkwood, Constantine Steamship Line, Ltd.
- Sidney William Turner, chairman, Coventry, Nuneaton and District War Pensions Committee.
- Henry Massey Turvey, Higher Executive Officer, Air Ministry.
- Johanna Helena (Joan) Van Thal, Director, Department of Speech Therapy, Central School of Speech Training, London.
- James Trickey Vowles, Senior Executive Officer, War Office.
- Tom Wadsworth, Chief Inspector, Calder and Hebble Section, North Eastern Region, Docks and Inland Waterways Executive.
- Harold Isaac Fyjis-Walker, Secretary, Cambridge Preservation Society.
- Herbert Robert Waller, JP, Chairman of Committee, No. 10F (Luton) Squadron, Air Training Corps.
- John Alfred Walters, Member, Bristol Local Employment Committee.
- Geoffrey William Warren, Physicist, Research Laboratories, General Electric Company, Ltd.
- Charlotte Mary Waterlow, Administrative Officer, Foreign Office.
- Herbert Watts, Inspector of Taxes, Higher Grade, Board of Inland Revenue.
- Jane Lennie Waugh, District Nurse, Bannockburn.
- John Webster, FRICS, Divisional Officer, Forestry Commission.
- Alan Willsher Weekes, MIMechE, Industrial Member, Coventry and District Committee, Midland Regional Board for Industry.
- Percy Stanley West, Senior Executive Officer, General Post Office.
- Horace Burgoyne Whiskin, Senior Executive Officer, HM Treasury.
- Cecil James Whittall. In charge of the Admiralty Division, Elliott Brothers (London), Ltd.
- Jack Ernest Morey Wicks, Executive Officer, Ministry of Food.
- Ernest Wilkinson, Chief Steward, RMS Andes, Royal Mail Lines, Ltd.
- Captain Frederick Williams, MC, DFC, Superintendent, St. Loyes College for the Disabled, Exeter.
- George Alfred Williams, Control Officer II, Control Commission for Germany, British Element.
- Thomas Haydn Williams, Mill Manager and Chief Roll Designer, Cargo Fleet Iron Company, Ltd., Middlesbrough.
- Muriel Moulsdale-Williams, Grade IV Officer, Foreign Office.
- Herbert Owen Wilshere, Honorary Secretary, Leicester Savings Committee.
- Herbert Walter Wilson, MM, AMIEE, Admiralty Liaison Engineer, General Electric Company, Ltd., Birmingham.
- John Wilson, AMINA, Chief Draughtsman, Admiralty Drawing Office, Harland and Wolff, Ltd., Belfast.
- Sam Clifford Wilson, Clerk to Camborne-Redruth Urban District Council, Cornwall.
- Arthur Charles Wise, Officer, Board of Customs and Excise.
- Lieutenant Colonel Charles Henry Fox Wollaston, MC, Chief Recruiting Officer, Southern Command, War Office.
- Albert Frank Wood, AMIMinE, Colliery Manager, West Midlands, Division of the National Coal Board.
- Marion Jane Wright, Senior Sister Tutor, Southend General Hospital.
- Angus McLeod Young, Meteorological Officer, Air Ministry.
- Nellie Hilda Young, Secretary to the Governing Body, Imperial College of Tropical Agriculture.
- John Agius, British subject resident in Egypt.
- Karl Andre Auty, British subject resident in the United States of America.
- Joseph Francois Michel Cassar, British subject resident in Algeria.
- Henry Waldo Coverley, British Vice-Consul at Oporto.
- John Crabb Edwards, Senior Public Health Inspector, Port Sudan.
- Lewis Forde, Senior, lately British Vice-Consul at Larache.
- Cecil Ernest Greatorex, Civil Liaison Officer, British Administration, Tripolitania.
- Frederick James Harper, British subject resident in Chile.
- Winifred Jessie Hitchcock, Examiner, Visa Section of His Majesty's Embassy in Brussels.
- Hubert Gordon Hopkirk, Temporary Secretary at His Majesty's Embassy at Bangkok.
- Muriel Grahame Jack, Shorthand-typist at His Majesty's Embassy at Nanking.
- Alexander Charles Jarvis, British subject resident in Denmark.
- Harry Taylor Lawrence. For services to the British Council in Ethiopia.
- Norman Leslie, until recently British Vice-Consul at Montevideo.
- Evelyn Lowe, British subject resident in the Argentine Republic.
- Roderick Price Mann, Assistant to Manager in Spain of the Eastern Telegraph Company at Vigo.
- Marjorie Mary Meeghan, Civilian Nursing Sister, British Administration, Somalia.
- Anthony Maurice Nowson, Archivist at His Majesty's Consulate-General at Alexandria.
- Alexander Ernest Passawer Percival, Cypher officer at His Majesty's Legation at Ciudad Trujillo.
- Madeleine Ines Reid, British subject resident in Greece.
- William Walter Richardson, Public Works Department, British Administration, Eritrea.
- Edgar Vincent Rizzo, lately clerk at His Majesty's Consulate-General at Istanbul.
- Heiga Schneider. For services at His Majesty's Consulate-General at Zurich.
- Christina Pirie Scotson, Private Secretary to His Majesty's Consul-General at Boston.
- Charles Bracey George Wilson, British Vice-Consul at Callao.
- Edward Youde, Third Secretary at His Majesty's Embassy at Nanking.
- Councillor Edwin Buckland, a member of the Huntly Shire Council, State of Victoria, since 1910.
- Edmund Charles Borlase Cockaine, Secretary, United Kingdom Citizens' Association in Bombay.
- Herbert James Cook, formerly Town Clerk, Bulawayo, Southern Rhodesia.
- Robert Dawson, a farmer in the Robe district, State of South Australia.
- Herbert Daniel Gowran FitzPatrick, District Commissioner, Swaziland.
- Veronica Margaret Gill. For services in connexion with patriotic and charitable movements in Port Pirie, State of South Australia.
- Hilda Dunnington-Jefferson. For services rendered under the auspices of the Victoria League in connexion with hospitality to visitors to the United Kingdom from overseas.
- Catherine Mabel Langham, Headmistress, Hasfa Homecraft Village, Southern Rhodesia.
- David Hercules Mochochoko, Senior Clerk and Interpreter, Secretariat, Basutoland.
- Councillor Arthur Hugh Moore, of the Shire of Alberton, State of Victoria.
- Ilma Meta Bridges Osborn, Matron, Melrose House for Aged and Indigent Blind, State of South Australia.
- Marjorie Alice Parker. For services in connexion with patriotic, and charitable movements in Launceston, State of Tasmania.
- Evelyn Emily Richardson, a missionary for 38 years at Mbuluzi in Swaziland.
- Margaret Roach, President, Fitzroy Ladies' Work Association, State of Victoria.
- Gladys Aroha Schott, Inspecting Sister, Department of Social Services, State of Tasmania.
- Lilian Alma Solly. For services rendered under the auspices of the Dominions Fellowship Trust in connexion with hospitality to visitors to the United Kingdom from overseas.
- Councillor Reginald Howard Lee Sparks. For services to Box Hill, State of Victoria.
- Patrick James Sylvester. For patriotic services in the State of Victoria.
- Harold Arthur Stanley Wiseman. For services to ex-servicemen in the State of Victoria.
- Ernest Verano Andlaw, AMIEE, AMIMechE, City Electrical Engineer, Gibraltar.
- Mary Elizabeth Arthur. For public services in Cyprus.
- Au Kwok-Leung, Clerk, Hong Kong.
- Alice Emma Blowers. For public services in Kenya.
- Denis George Britton, Colonial Audit Service, Director of Audit, British Guiana.
- The Reverend John Ethalstan Cheese. For missionary services in Somaliland, Aden and Kenya.
- Helen George Chryssafinis. For public services in Cyprus.
- Olive Alexandria Conton, Assistant Teacher, Annie Walsh Memorial School, Sierra Leone.
- Charles Henry Cox, Senior Gaoler, Prisons Department, Singapore.
- Dennis Murdoch Currie. For public services in Uganda.
- Clarence Maria Dass, Agricultural Assistant, Fiji.
- John Durey. For public services in British Guiana.
- Paul Duncan Fletcher, Colonial Administrative Service, Deputy British Agent, Eastern Aden Protectorate.
- Gabriel William Geikie, Municipal Assistant, Sibu, Sarawak.
- Mohamed Ghows, Education Officer, Singapore.
- Joseph Charles Gill, Revenue Inspector (Chief Gauger), Gibraltar.
- Albert Bgadedo Goyea, Senior Assistant Superintendent of Press, Nigeria.
- Jack Graham, Honorary Commissioner of Special Constabulary, Jamaica.
- Henry Magnus Grant, Headmaster, Accra Royal Boys' School, Gold Coast.
- Iris Dora Grant (Miss Brown), Matron, Grade 1, Malayan Medical Service.
- Eric Harvey Halse, Colonial Police Service, Deputy Commissioner of Police, Somaliland Protectorate.
- Reginald John Hart, Senior Agricultural Supervisor, Northern Rhodesia.
- Arthur Allan Hinds, Senior Clerk, Colonial Secretary's Office, Barbados.
- Clementine Margaret Mary Huffelmann, Queen Elizabeth's Colonial Nursing Service, Nursing Sister, Federation of Malaya.
- Edward Victor Hulme, Engineer-Clerk, Aberdare District Council, Kenya.
- William Stuart Hutchins, Engineer in Charge, Lusaka Electricity and Water Undertakings, Northern Rhodesia.
- Phyllis Hutchinson, Queen Elizabeth's Colonial Nursing Service, Nursing Sister, Nyasaland.
- Lalchan Jaggernauth. For public services in Trinidad.
- George Robert Arthur McGard Johnston, DSO, DFC, Colonial Administrative Service, District Officer, Tanganyika.
- Francis Ezekiel Jones, Headmaster, Duke Town School, Calabar, Nigeria.
- Francois Jumeau. For public services in the Seychelles.
- Charles Macdonald Lastique. For public services in Trinidad.
- Poon Lip Loh, JP, (formerly Teo Soh Choo). For public services in Singapore.
- Sarah Lyon, Sister in Charge, Church Missionary Society Hospital, Fort Portal, Uganda.
- Thomas Matthew McCartney. For public services in Trinidad.
- Robert Darius James M'Cauley, Manager of the Freetown Rice Mill, Sierra Leone.
- Susan McKennel, District Missionary of the Slessor Memorial Institute, Aro, Nigeria.
- Mgoye Mgoye. For service with the East African Construction Forces (Civil), Kenya.
- Vera Moody. For public services in Jamaica.
- Arthur Mullin, Temporary Surveyor, Public Works Department, Gold Coast.
- Ooi Hong Suat (Mrs. Chong Ah Khoon). For public services in the Federation of Malaya.
- Joseph John Outerbridge, Secretary, Trade Development Board, Bermuda.
- Gemma Ramkeesoon. For public services in Trinidad.
- Charles Samuel Sayce, Assistant Stores Superintendent, East African Railways and Harbours.
- Barbara Gertrude Schofield, Queen Elizabeth's Colonial Nursing Service, Senior Nursing Sister, Nigeria.
- Eric Gordon Shrubbs, Principal, Government Secondary School, Aden.
- Ujagar Singh, Executive Officer, Grade I, Hong Kong.
- Victor Ffennell Smith, Colonial Administrative Service, District Commissioner, Sierra Leone.
- Constantinos Athanassios Soteriades, Administrative Assistant, 1st Grade, Cyprus.
- Kandiah Subramanian, Paymaster, Federation of Malaya Police Force.
- Francis Reeves Sweet, Development Officer, Swollen Shoot Campaign, Nigeria.
- Sybil Mary Swift, Colonial Education Service, Senior Mistress, Education Department, Hong Kong.
- Captain Syed Shaidali bin Asgar Alt, Headmaster, Government English School, Parit, Federation of Malaya.
- Charles Archibald Darrell Talbot, Secretary, Currency and Exchange Control Board, Bermuda.
- Jovesa Tana. For public services in Fiji.
- Phyllis Tanner. For public services in Tanganyika.
- Emanuel Tonna, Headmaster of Elementary School, Malta.
- Tuanku Mohamed bin Tuanku Tibu, Datu, Sarawak.
- Un Ting Fan, Clerical Officer, Grade I, Hong Kong.
- William Bernard Walters, Superintendent of Stock Transfer Office, Crown Agents for the Colonies.
- Maud Ward, Superintendent of Nurses, Nethersole Hospital, Hong Kong.
- Thomas Edwin Went, Assistant to the Colonial Engineer, Barbados.
- Cecil Winnington-Ingram, Colonial Administrative Service, District Officer, Tanganyika.
- Yeo Koon Guan, Chief Clerk, Medical Department, Singapore.

Honorary Members

- Wakil-Qaid Hassan Mumin, Police Assistant to the Resident Adviser, Commandant of Police and Superintendent of Prisons in the Mukalla Government, Aden.
- Azan bin Rashed (Sheikh), Liwali of Lamu, Kenya.
- Abdullahi, Emir of Yauri, Second Class Chief, Nigeria.
- James Kamalu Nzerem, Headmaster of St. Paul's School, Owerri, Nigeria.
- Mikaeri Byabadda Wamala, Treasurer to the Uganda Growers' Co-operative Union, Ltd., Uganda.

=== British Empire Medals (BEM) ===
Military Division

Royal Navy

- Sergeant (Acting Quartermaster Sergeant) John Arthur Abram, Po.X.4734, Royal Marines.
- Mechanician 1 William Albert John Adams, D/KX88002.
- Chief Mechanician Robert Arnold, C/KX82947.
- Chief Petty Officer Telegraphist Geoffrey William Charles Bond, P/J111864.
- Chief Petty Officer (G.I.) Eric John Burrell, P/JX133573.
- Musician William Arthur Clarke, Ply.X.4627, Royal Marines.
- Chief Petty Officer Cook (S) Reginald Hollis Critchett, P/MX50842.
- Sick Berth Petty Officer Jack Stanley Crocker, D/MX50540.
- Chief Petty Officer Sidney Edward George Cunningham, C/JX128890.
- Chief Petty Officer Wilfred Darnborough, P/JX126937.
- Petty Officer Wren Cook (O) Mary Anne Day, 66556, Women's Royal Naval Service.
- Petty Officer Stoker Mechanic Charles Henry Drew, P/K63136.
- Chief Electrical Artificer Bert Ellingham, C/MX47218.
- Chief Engine Room Artificer Henry Charles Evans, D/MX57571.
- Chief Ordnance Artificer (Pensioner) Richard John Fiford, P/272406.
- Chief Petty Officer Royal George Howard, C/JX129416.
- Chief Electrician William Jackson, D/MX844267.
- Petty Officer Wren Cook (S) Gladys Jones, 42991, Women's Royal Naval Service.
- Petty Officer Edward Carson McColgan, U.D.607, Royal Naval Volunteer Reserve.
- Stores Chief Petty Officer Henry Cornelius Palmer, P/MX50183.
- Chief Petty Officer Telegraphist Samuel Harry Perrin, P/JX125273.
- Chief Petty Officer Writer Leonard Alfred Phillips, P/MX47196.
- Chief Yeoman of Signals Cecil Maxwell Samuels, C/JX767985.
- Leading Stores Assistant Thomas David Saunders, C/MX92254.
- Chief Petty Officer Air (Air Mechanic (A)) Leslie Storer, L/FX76126.
- Quartermaster Sergeant Sidney Victor Taylor, Ply.X.1061, Royal Marines.
- Chief Shipwright Artificer Albert Robert James Tremain, C/MX47397.
- Petty Officer Kenneth John Trenaman, P/JX140175.
- Sergeant (Acting Colour Sergeant) Alfred Whitehouse, Ch.X.698, Royal Marines.
- Chief Engine Room Artificer David Lloyd Williams, C/MX56868.

Army

- No. W/152566 Warrant Officer Class II (acting) Elizabeth Allen, Women's Royal Army Corps.
- No. NA/89142 Warrant Officer Class II Christopher Amu, Nigeria Signal Squadron, Royal West Africa Frontier Force.
- No. M/1157 Sergeant Hoseah Ayub, East Africa Army Medical Corps.
- No. 11401433 Corporal George Baker, Army Catering Corps.
- No. T/14730572 Sergeant John Terrence Bassett, Royal Army Service Corps.
- No. GC/12822 Warrant Officer Class I Amani Bazabarimi, Gold Coast Regiment, Royal West Africa Frontier Force.
- No. 16000130 Sergeant Arthur Bell, Army Air Corps.
- No. 2608018 Lance Corporal Thomas Bishop, Grenadier Guards.
- No. 2329984 Squadron Quarter Master Sergeant Cyril Patrick Bolton, Royal Corps of Signals.
- No. 1057300 Bombardier Morley Bradley, Royal Regiment of Artillery.
- No. 2379936 Sergeant (acting) Stanley Francis Cairo, Royal Corps of Signals.
- No. S/14449698 Sergeant (acting) William Charles Cartwright, Royal Army Service Corps.
- No. ZBK/12509 Warrant Officer Class I Tiyesi Chinawa, East African Artillery.
- No. 14476560 Warrant Officer Class II (acting) John Robert Nathanial Marshall Connelly, Corps of Royal Engineers.
- No. 21057655 Signalman Peter Cowley, Royal Corps of Signals.
- No. 831772 Staff Sergeant Percival Edward Davies, Royal Regiment of Artillery.
- No. 14396225 Sergeant Ernest George Field, The Oxfordshire and Buckinghamshire Light Infantry.
- No. S/2756095 Staff Sergeant (acting) William James Fields, Royal Army Service Corps.
- No. GC/11687 Warrant Officer Class I Konyibe Fra Fra, Gold Coast Regiment, Royal West Africa Frontier Force.
- No. W/157591 Staff Sergeant (acting) Sheila Gayward (née Howe), Women's Royal Army Corps.
- No. S/93067 Warrant Officer Class II (acting) Leonard Alexander Goldsmith, Royal Army Service Corps.
- No. 7881051 Sergeant (Warrant Officer Class II (acting)) Walter George Goodall, Royal Tank Regiment, Royal Armoured Corps.
- No. T/14188934 Sergeant George Green, Royal Army Service Corps.
- No. 1066876 Staff Sergeant (Artillery Clerk) Frank Harris, Royal Regiment of Artillery.
- No. 7586528 Warrant Officer Class II (acting) Gilbert Arnold Jefferis, Royal Army Ordnance Corps.
- No. 7601414 Staff Sergeant (Warrant Officer Class II (local)) peter Roger King, Royal Electrical and Mechanical Engineers.
- No. 1948296 Sergeant Douglas William Lander, Corps of Royal Engineers.
- No. S/6010803 Staff Sergeant (acting) Clifford James Lowe, Royal Army Service Corps.
- No. 4389372 Sergeant Fred Lowe, Corps of Royal Military Police.
- No. 21021374 Sergeant (Pipe Major) Arthur McBurnie, The Royal Ulster Rifles, Territorial Army.
- No. 883554 Sergeant Peter Frederick McGovern, Royal Regiment of Artillery.
- No. 2969647 Colour Sergeant James Peddie Milne, MM, The Argyll and Sutherland Highlanders (Princess Louise's), Territorial Army.
- No. S/10704529 Staff Sergeant Sidney James Prothero, Royal Army Service Corps.
- No. 21004486 Sergeant William Reginald Rawlings, Corps of Royal Engineers, Territorial Army.
- No. 845910 Battery Quarter-Master Sergeant James Bruce Rendall, Royal Regiment of Artillery.
- No. 21028882 Sergeant (acting) Norman Stanley Richardson, Royal Corps of Signals.
- No. S/1478130 Warrant Officer Class II (acting) Cyril Douglas Rowbottom, Royal Army Service Corps.
- No. 923 Warrant Officer Class I Mohamed Saeed, Somaliland Scouts.
- No. S/57483 Staff Sergeant Sidney Robert Dixon Scott, Royal Army Service Corps.
- No. 7261725 Warrant Officer Class I (acting) Harry Stapp Teanby, Royal Army (Medical Corps.
- No. 5119805 Warrant Officer Class II (acting) Edward William Vaughan, Royal Army Ordnance Corps.
- No. W/632212 Staff Sergeant Gertrude Alice Vincent, Voluntary Aid Detachment.
- No. S/204474 Staff Sergeant Leonard George Warr, Royal Army Service Corps.
- No. 4684058 Colour Sergeant George Edward Watterson, The King's Own Yorkshire Light Infantry, Territorial Army.
- No. S/2821006 Staff Sergeant (acting) John Webster, Royal Army Service Corps.
- No. 781498 Sergeant William Edward Welsh, Royal Corps of Signals.
- No. 869725 Sergeant Kenneth Hougart Whttley, Royal Regiment of Artillery, Territorial Army.
- No. T/56865 Company Quarter-Master Sergeant Ronald Willmott, Royal Army Service Corps.

Royal Air Force

- 522436 Flight Sergeant James Richard Berwick.
- 517496 Flight Sergeant Joseph Boyce.
- 560037 Flight Sergeant Ronald William James Bradley.
- 508708 Flight Sergeant James William Butler.
- 562042 Flight Sergeant Clifford John Mills Chilcott.
- 10401 Flight Sergeant Frank Jonathan Clift.
- 563776 Flight Sergeant Leslie Daniels.
- 363817 Flight Sergeant Thomas Arthur Edney.
- 528861 Flight Sergeant Joseph Henry Gardner.
- 352614 Flight Sergeant Leslie Rodwell Hale.
- 331334 Flight Sergeant Henry William Hensman.
- 511097 Flight Sergeant William Frederick Hewson.
- 611982 Flight Sergeant Douglas William Hook.
- 571415 Flight Sergeant Robert Harry Manage.
- 564892 Flight Sergeant James Morris.
- 527964 Flight Sergeant James Harold French Murphy.
- 561605 Flight Sergeant John Victor Palmer.
- 63651 Flight Sergeant Thomas Roy Scott.
- 573444 Flight Sergeant Donald Ernest Siddons.
- 560414 Flight Sergeant Arthur Slorance.
- 545892 Sergeant Maurice John Ager.
- 628740 Sergeant John David Dyer Biss.
- 1290097 Sergeant Jack Joseph Church.
- 624069 Sergeant Bertram Hodsdon.
- 591509 Sergeant John Dennis Irving.
- 2075344 Sergeant Joan Morgan, Women's Royal Air Force.
- 2047592 Sergeant Rita Jean Prance, Women's Royal Air Force.
- 576326 Sergeant Harold Edward Smale.
- 771630 Sergeant George Blackburn Stout.
- 421778 Sergeant May Iris Wilson, Women's Royal Air Force.
- 2158837 Corporal Freda Draper, Women's Royal Air Force.
- 579135 Corporal Cyril Harris.
- 1269644 Corporal Alfred Thomas Horne.
- 1828502 Corporal Stanley Johnson.
- 2688000 Corporal John Gerrard King, Royal Auxiliary Air Force.
- 651553 Corporal Harry Waring.

Civil Division

United Kingdom

- Mabel Affleck, Honorary Collector, Dacre Road Street Savings Group, Plaistow.
- James Cox Aitken, Clerk of Works, Department of Agriculture for Scotland. (Lanark).
- Kathleen Dorothy Anderson, Organiser, Old People's Welfare, Women's Voluntary Services, Edinburgh.
- John Atkinson, Relaying Inspector, Hull District, Railway Executive.
- William Alfred Atwell, Office. Keeper, Grade II, Ministry of Civil Aviation. (South Tottenham, N.15).
- David Wickham Ayre, Senior Architectural Assistant, Ministry of Works. (Staines, Middlesex).
- John Banks, Fitter and Turner, James Troop & Company. (Liverpool).
- Louis Barber, Fitter, Hawker Aircraft Ltd. (Surbiton, Surrey).
- William George Barnes, Chief Office Keeper, Ministry of Works. (Kennington, S.E.11).
- Edwin Barnett, Charge Hand, Lancashire Aircraft Corporation, Schleswigland. (Liverpool).
- Sidney Herbert Baxter, Honorary Collector, Street Savings Group, Northfleet, Kent.
- Leslie Bearne, Technician Grade III, Military Engineering Experimental Establishment, Ministry of Supply, Christchurch, Hampshire.
- Doris Bell. For services to the Malcolm Club, Gatow Airport, Berlin.
- Nellie Betts, Supervisor, Telephone Exchange, Head Post Office. Sheffield.
- Henry-Leslie Boon, Charge Hand and Head Turner, Bristol Pottery. (Bristol).
- Henry William Bourne, Printing Overseer Grade IV, Savings Department, General Post Office. (South Harrow, Middlesex).
- Arthur James Bradshaw, Works Foreman, Bromley, London Electricity Board.
- Arthur Hannam Bray, Chief Detective Inspector, West Riding Constabulary. (Wakefield).
- Jack Bray, Aircraft Rigger, Westminster Airways, Ltd., Fuhlsbüttel and Schleswigland. (Plumstead, S.E.18).
- Albert Edward Breeze, Manager, Hay Undertaking, Wales Gas Board. (Hay-on-Wye).
- Albert Frederick Brind, Research & Experimental Mechanic, Aircraft Torpedo Development Unit, Royal Naval Air Station, Ministry of Supply, Gosport.
- Alfred Henry Brockwell, Inspector (Engineering), London Telecommunications Region, General Post Office. (Shirley, Surrey).
- Charles Farrance Brown, Senior Production Engineer, Rockware Glass Syndicate Ltd. (Greenford, Middlesex).
- Edward Brunyee, Postman, Higher Grade, Head Post Office, Manchester.
- Albert John Buckley, Honorary Organiser and Collector, Pinewood Studios Savings Group. (Shepherds Bush, W.12).
- Albert Bunker, Engineering and Maintenance Foreman, London Brick Company Ltd. (Wooton, Bedford).
- Betty Burland, Forewoman, Women's Land Army, Somerset. (Victoria, S.W.1).
- Arthur Charles Butler, Senior Messenger, Air Ministry. (Stockwell, S.W.9).
- Enoch Carpenter, Watch Case Springer, Dennison Watch Case Company Ltd. (Birmingham).
- James Carr, Company Officer, Angus Area Fire Brigade, Dundee.
- John Carroll, Head Gardener, Imperial War Graves Commission, Belgium.
- Edward Ernest Carter, Coal Foreman, South Eastern Gas Board. (Wimbledon Park, S.W.20).
- John Chaffin, Acting Chief Inspector, War Department Constabulary. (Didcot, Berkshire).
- Ernest Chapman, MC, Head Office Keeper, Commonwealth Relations Office.
- Henry Thomas Arthur Charleston, Mechanical Fitter, Cornwall Sub-Area, South Western Electricity Board. (Camborne).
- William Henry Clay, Underground Dataller Stafford No. 1 Colliery, West Midlands Division, National Coal Board. (Stoke-on-Trent).
- William Clewer, Principal Yard Foreman, Army Ordnance Depot, Hong Kong.
- William Richard Clucas, Pier Master, Mersey Docks & Harbour Board. (Liverpool).
- John Andrew Coles, Accident Prevention Officer, English Electric Company Ltd. (Rugby).
- William Henry Augustus Coles, Inspector (Engineering), General Post Office, Llanelly.
- John Williamson Collinson, Senior Inspector, Grimsby Gas Undertaking, East Midlands Gas Board. (Laceby).
- John Connor, DCM, Mains Foreman, Merseyside and North Wales Board, British Electricity Authority. (St. Helens).
- George Herbert Constance, Manager, Fishermen's Trade Guild. (Aldeburgh, Suffolk).
- George William Cooke, Sugar End Foreman, Bury St. Edmunds Factory, British Sugar Corporation.
- Charles Cox, Despatch and Distribution Supervisor, Foreign Office. (Morden, Surrey).
- Thomas Cuthbert, Foreman Colliery Blacksmith, Auchincruive Colliery, Scottish Division, National Coal Board. (Ayr).
- William Arthur Edward Daborn, Shop Foreman, Submarine Cables Ltd. (Greenwich, S.E.10).
- Clara Daniels, Home Help, Health Department, Birmingham County Borough.
- Charlotte Davies, Screenhand, Long Lane Colliery, North Western Division, National Coal Board. (Wigan).
- Edward Dawes, Station Officer, Somerset County Fire Brigade. (Clevedon).
- Arthur Philip Dyer, Senior Assistant (Scientific), Department of Scientific and Industrial Research. (Watford, Hertfordshire).
- Alfred Henry Dymott, Driver, Harrow Weald Garage, London Transport Executive. (Harrow, Middlesex).
- Frank Walter Edgell, Universal Miller, Bristol Aeroplane Company, (Engine Division). (Bristol).
- Philip Alfred Embling, Laboratory Mechanic, Admiralty Mining Establishment, Fareham. (Gosport, Hampshire).
- Arthur Dunstan Evans, Pensioner Dental Surgery Attendant, R.N. Hospital, Haslar. (Gosport, Hampshire).
- Dorothy Evans, Centre Organiser, Women's Voluntary Services, Crayford, Kent.
- John William Evans, Inspector, Metropolitan Police. (Westminster, S.W.1).
- May Louise Evans, Overseer (F), Fleet Street Branch Post Office, London. (Ilford, Essex).
- Elizabeth Mackie Findlay, Manageress, N.A.A.F.I., Canteen, Aberdeen.
- James Fletcher, Deputy, St. John's Colliery, North Eastern Division, National Coal Board. (Normanton).
- Sydney Herbert Franklin, Postman, Higher Grade, Western District Office, General Post Office. (Southall, Middlesex).
- Barbara Fraser, Chief Officer (Class II), HM Prison, Edinburgh.
- Cecil Hilton Frost, Charge Depot Inspector, London Transport Executive, (Dagenham, Essex).
- George Fundell, Foreman Fish Porter, H. Barrow and Company. (Maidstone, Kent).
- Frank Gillespie, Head Foreman Ironman, Tyne Dock Engineering Company Ltd. (South Shields).
- John Augustus Goater, Donkeyman/Greaser, SS Raimar, Radon Navigation Company Ltd. (Barry).
- Samuel John Gorvett, Turbine Room Shift Foreman,. South Wales Division, British Electricity Authority. (Pontypridd).
- Hubert James Gowing, Chargehand, Dennis Bros. Ltd. (Guildford, Surrey).
- Donald Barren Grant, Manager, Lord Roberts Workshops, Highland Branch, Inverness.
- Herbert Grant, Farm Foreman, North Moor Farm, Keadby, Scunthorpe.
- Leonard George Haldane, Acting Foreman of Storehouses, HM Dockyard, Gibraltar.
- James Hallam, Foreman, Royal Crown Derby Porcelain Company Ltd. (Stoke-on-Trent).
- Thomas Osborne Hames, Signalman, Leicester, Railway Executive.
- Frederick Janies Hammond, Mate-on-Shore, Royal Naval Armament Depot, Priddy's Hard. (Gosport, Hampshire).
- William Henry Hancock, Chargeman Filler, Williamthorpe Colliery, East Midlands Division, National Coal Board. (Chesterfield).
- George Wilfred Harris, Sealer and Annealer, Jury Holloware (Stevens) Ltd. (Stourbridge).
- Frank Thomas Hartley, Acting Inspector of Engine Fitters, Admiralty. (Ipswich, Suffolk).
- William Hatherly, Foreman Shipwright, Vespers Ltd. (Cosham, Hampshire).
- Doris Haydon, Centre Organiser, Women's Voluntary Services, North Radstock, Urban District.
- Percy Victor Heppel, Preventive Officer, London Airport, Board, of Customs and Excise. (Harlington, Middlesex).
- William John Hillman, Technical Officer, Engineering Department, General Post Office. (North Harrow, Middlesex).
- Robert Hogg, Inspector (Postal), Head Post Office, Glasgow.
- George Hole, Research and Experimental Mechanic, Fighting Vehicles Proving Establishment, Ministry of Supply, Chertsey. (Egham, Surrey).
- Stanley Holland, Deckhand, Steam Trawler Rinovia, Rinovia Steam Trawling Company. (Grimsby).
- Henry Hood, Works Foreman, Lawes Chemical Company, Ltd. (Dagenham, Essex).
- John Howard, Skilled Fitter, Guest, Keen & Nettlefolds (Midlands) Ltd. (Smethwick).
- Charles Howe, Coal Hewer, Addison Colliery, Northern Division, National Coal Board. (Ryton-on-Tyne).
- Alexander Howie, Chargeman, Imperial Chemical Industries Ltd. (Saltcoats).
- Jane Hudson, Inspector, Newcastle City Police Force.
- Robert Llewelyn Hughes, Foreman of Works, HM Prison, Pentonville.
- Elizabeth Hulme, Teapot Lid Maker, Arthur Wood & Son (Longport) Ltd. (Stoke-on-Trent).
- Charles Joseph Innocent, Fitter, Armstrong-Siddeley Motors Ltd. (Coventry).
- James Jackson, Mule Spinner, Bamber Bridge Spinning Company. (Preston).
- Thomas Kingston Jarvis, Station Officer, London Fire Brigade. (Mile End, E.1).
- Emma Jenkinson, Organiser and Collector, Street Savings Group, Portadown, County Armagh.
- William Stephen James Juniper, Traffic Superintendent, No. 35 Maintenance Unit, RAF Heywood. (Manchester).
- Nassa bin Karyanam, Plumber, Grade I, Garrison Engineer's Office, Blakang Mati, Singapore.
- Walter Kehoe, Spinning Overlooker, Patons & Baldwins Ltd. (Darlington).
- William Kellie, Repair Manager (Steel Work), Ardrossan Dockyard Ltd. (Saltcoats, Ayrshire).
- Francis Richard Martyn Kelly, Engineer-in-Charge, Royal Victoria Yard, Deptford.
- Thomas Kirk, Pumpman, Cossall Colliery, East Midlands Division, National Coal Board. (Ilkeston).
- Raymond Lamb, Flight and Ground Engineer, Eagle Aviation, Fuhlsbüttel. (Streatham, S.W.16)
- Leonard Lewis, Leading Hand, Mond Nickel Company Ltd. (Swansea).
- Mary Hannah Lewis, Blackplate Opener, Richard Thomas &, Baldwins Ltd. (Port Talbot).
- Albert Lindgvist, Carpenter, SS Llangollen, Llangollen Steamship Company. (Barry).
- John Joseph Livock, Foreman Engineer, Wm. Clowes & Sons Ltd. (Beccles, Suffolk).
- Richard George Logan, Artificer, Royal Parks. (Stanmore, Middlesex).
- Alfred Longdon, Underground Pony Stable Attendant, Coppice Colliery, West Midlands Division, National Coal Board. (Cannock).
- George William Looker, Senior Draughtsman, Admiralty. (Kingston upon Thames, Surrey).
- Georgina Lothian, Honorary Organiser and Collector, Almondsbury Savings Group, Gloucester.
- Malcolm Macaskill, lately Auxiliary Postman, Stornoway, Isle of Lewis. (Luachair, Stornoway).
- James McGowan, Boatswain, SS Peleus, Alfred Holt & Company Ltd. (Liverpool).
- Donald John MacLean, Boatswain, SS Helicina, Anglo-Saxon Petroleum Company Ltd. (Leverburgh, Isle-of-Harris).
- John McPherson, Brass Finisher, Cowlairs, Railway Executive. (Glasgow).
- John Malin, Donkeyman, SS Moreton Bay, Shaw, Savill & Albion Company Ltd.
- Tom Manley, Surface Screenman, Coedely Colliery, South Western Division, National Coal Board. (Glamorgan).
- John Sprake Edward Marsh, Mantle Maintenance Man, North Thames Gas Board. (Fulham, S.W.16)
- Thomas William Marshall, Weaver, John Cockcroft & Sons, Ltd. (Todmorden).
- John Thomas Luther Marson, Enginewright, Blidworth Colliery, East Midlands Division, National Coal Board. (Mansfield).
- William Henry Matthews, Member, Coast Life Saving Corps, Port Talbot, Glamorgan.
- Owen Patrick Melvin, Sergeant, Royal Ulster Constabulary. (Londonderry).
- Alexander McNiven Menzies, Postal and Telegraph Officer, Head Post Office, Oban.
- George Walter Merritt, Principal Workshop Foreman, 28 Command Workshops, War Office, Hilsea. (Warblington, Hampshire).
- Dorothy Melinda Mills, Member, Women's Land Army. (Leamington Spa).
- Margaret Mills, Chief Officer, HM Prison, Armagh.
- John Morris, Head Foreman Riveter, Greenock Dockyard Company Ltd. (Port Glasgow, Renfrewshire).
- Robert William Mullen, Pithead Baths Attendant, Brancepeth Colliery, Northern Division, National Coal Board. (Oakenshaw, County Durham).
- Frank Mumford, Riding Saddle Maker, Jabez Cliff & Company Ltd. (Walsall).
- Sydney Murray, Supervisor, Grade I, Control Commission for Germany, British Element.
- Violet Naldrett, Centre Organiser, Women's Voluntary Services, Chertsey. (Addlestone, Surrey).
- Herbert Needham, Collier, Frickley Colliery, North Eastern Division, National Coal Board. (Pontefract).
- Thomas Nicholls, Foreman Mason, Baglan Bay Tinplate Company Ltd. (Briton Ferry, Neath).
- John Edward Nicklin, Glass Maker, Stuart & Sons Ltd. (Stourbridge).
- William Arthur Nicols, Training Officer, Freeton (Colliery, North Eastern Division, National Coal Board. (Rotherham).
- Gladys May Owen, Overseer (F), Head Post Office, Worcester.
- Harry Parker, Senior Fitter, Vaughan Crane Company Ltd. (Manchester).
- Archibald Patterson, Fitter, RAF Station Bedford. (Riseley).
- James Patterson, Stoneman, Eccles Colliery, Northern Division, National Coal Board. (Shiremoor).
- Robert William Pawson, Principal Foreman, Royal Aircraft Establishment, Famborough.
- Jesse Payne, Station Officer, HM Coastguard, Felixstowe.
- George Penniket, Foreman, Ross Ltd. (Mitcham, Surrey).
- Nellie Gertrude Pitt, Forewoman, Leethems (Twilfit) Ltd. (Portsmouth).
- Alfred Plows, Gas Fitter, North Eastern Gas Board. (York).
- Joseph Portelli, Chargeman of Riggers, Boom Defence Depot/Malta.
- James Dawson Porter, Auxiliary Postman, Eskdale Sub-Post Office, Holmrook, Cumberland.
- James Jackson Priestley, Lock-keeper, Leeds, Docks and Inland Waterways.
- Arthur Charles Pritchard, Warrant Officer, No. 1201 (Ledbury) Squadron, Air Training Corps. (Ledbury, Herefordshire).
- William Pugh, Operative Dyer, Carpet Manufacturing Company. (Kidderminster).
- Haida Purcell, Forewoman, Women's Land Army, Saltaire, Shipley.
- Thomas Allen Rakes, Conveyor Attendant, Old Mills Colliery, South Western Division, National Coal Board. (Bristol).
- Albert Ramsden, Surface Labourer, Woolley Colliery, North Eastern Division, National Coal Board. (Barnsley)..
- William Ernest Read, Boiler House Foreman, Midlands Division, British Electricity Authority. (Birmingham).
- Gomer Rees, Mill Superintendent, Steel Company of Wales, Ltd. (Swansea).
- Charles Peter Richards, Draughtsman (Special Grade), Air Ministry, Singapore.
- Robert George Ridges, Foreman Motor Mechanic, Ordnance Survey Office. (Southampton).
- Jessie McAlley Robb, Sergeant, Edinburgh City Police.
- Hilda Roberts, Centre Organiser, Women's Voluntary Services, Bridgend, Glamorgan.
- Joseph Robinson, Senior Moulder, Head Wrightson & Company Ltd. (Middlesbrough).
- William Roff, Engineer, St. George's, Stamford, Kesteven County Council.
- Beatrice Faith Rogers, lately Head of Civic Restaurant, Bedford.
- Sarah Ann Rowe, Member, Scottish Women's Land Army, Tullich Farm, Balquhidder, Perthshire.
- David Russ, Chief Butcher, RMS Rangitata, New Zealand Shipping Company Ltd. (Mitcham, Surrey).
- Ernest Joseph Russell, Group Office Assistant, Royal Ordnance Factories, Woolwich. (Abbey Wood, S.E.2).
- George Sanford, Postman, Head Post Office, Birmingham.
- Frank William Scott, lately Technician, Tunbridge Wells Telephone Area, Kent. (Tonbridge, Kent).
- Walter Scott, Leading Fireman, South Eastern Fire Brigade, Hawick.
- William Evelin George Shenton, Boatswain, ex-RMS Magdalena, Royal Mail Lines, Ltd. (New Milton Hampshire).
- Frederick James Sherry, Sub-Station Foreman, Eastern Electricity Board. (Finchley, N.12).
- Dorothy Shipman, Centre Organiser, Women's Voluntary Services, Grantham.
- Robert William Smith, Sub-Postmaster, Burnsall Sub-Office, Skipton, Yorkshire.
- John William Snape, Dock Supervisor, Rogers White and Company Ltd. (Liverpool).
- George Sparks, Skilled Mechanic, Cambois Colliery, Northern Division, National Coal Board. (Blyth, Northumberland).
- Kenneth Stewart, Boatswain, MV Durham, Federal Steam Navigation Company Ltd., (Tong, Stornoway).
- Norman Sturdy, Chargehand, Anhydrous Ammonia Filling Station, Imperial Chemical Industries Ltd. (Middlesbrough).
- Warren John Swann, Superintendent of Stores, No. 14 Maintenance Unit, RAF Carlisle.
- James Desmond Sweetnam, Assembly Superintendent. E. K. Cole. Ltd. (Malmesbury, Wiltshire).
- Charles George Thatcher, Supervisor, Grade I, Control Commission for Germany, British Element.
- Glyndwr Thomas, Assistant Divisional Officer, Glamorgan County Fire Brigade. (Port Talbot).
- John George Thomas, Assistant Yardmaster, Hartlepools Docks. (Darlington).
- James F. Thomson, Honorary Organiser and Collector, Newenden Village Savings Group, Kent.
- William Thomas Trezise, Chargehand Plater, Silley Cox & Company Ltd. (Falmouth, Cornwall).
- Fred Tune, Foreman Bricklayer, Appleby Frodingham Steel Company. (Scunthorpe).
- Clifford Turner, Machine Tool Fitter, Dowty Equipment Ltd. (Cheltenham).
- Mary Tyler, Street Savings Group Organiser and Collector, Burslem, Stoke-on-Trent.
- George Henry Vowles, Depot Manager, Bristol Area, House Coal Distribution (Emergency) Scheme. (Bristol).
- Winifred Walker, Centre Organiser, Women's Voluntary Services, Chanctonbury Rural District.
- John Lewis Warlow, Foreman of Shipyard, Hancocks Shipbuilding Company (Pembroke) Ltd. (Waterstone, Milford Haven).
- David Charles Webster, Coachmaker, Hackey Garage, London Transport Executive. (Stroud Green, N.4).
- Lucy Webster, Farm Worker, Betsham, Kent.
- Thomas Rendell Wells, Instructor, Waddon Government Training Centre, Ministry of Labour and National Service. (Teddington, Middlesex).
- William Welsh, Foreman, Carnation Condensery, General Milk Products Ltd. (Dumfries).
- Ernest Claude Wessell, Senior Paper Keeper, HM Stationery Office. (East Greenwich, S.E.10).
- George Lilburn Yetts, Custodian, Lindisfarne Priory, Holy Island, Berwick-on-Tweed.
- David Young, Surface Worker, Arniston Colliery, Scottish Division, National Coal Board. (Gorebridge)..

Colonial Empire

- Eleftherios Christofides, Supervisor in the Field, Malaria Eradication Scheme, Cyprus.
- Zehon Panayi Eliades, Supervisor in the Field, Malaria Eradication Scheme, Cyprus.
- Costas Georghiou Fisher, Supervisor in the Field, Malaria Eradication Scheme, Cyprus.
- Stelios Elia Soteriou, Supervisor in the Field, Malaria Eradication Scheme, Cyprus.
- Ah Tewfik, Supervisor in the Field, Malaria Eradication Scheme, Cyprus.
- Michael Toumazou, Supervisor in the Field, Malaria Eradication Scheme, Cyprus.
- Harry Kay, Foreman (Maintenance), East African Railways and Harbours, Nairobi.
- Musulwa Saidi Kapere, Laboratory Assistant, East African Trypanosomiasis Research Organisation, Tinde, Kenya.
- Muthan son of Manthayan, Linesman, Telecommunications Department, Kroh, Federation of Malaya.
- Thillaiampalam Karthigasu, Technical Assistant, Public Works Department, Pahang, Federation of Malaya.
- Awang Sulong bin Haji Ali, Penghulu, Keratong, Pahang, Federation of Malaya.
- Ali Bah, Head Gardener, Botanical Gardens, Cape St. Mary, Gambia.
- Joseph Ndife Okafor, Veterinary Assistant, Grade I, Veterinary Department, Gambia.
- Harvey Anthony King, Forest Ranger Grade I, Forestry Department, Jamaica.
- Hassan Bankade, lately Government Messenger, Nigeria.
- Emanuel Akandu Anorue, Inspector of Police, Grade II, Nigeria.
- Bsperance Servina, Senior Port Coxswain, Port and Marine Department, Seychelles.
- Evelyn Leslie Foy Leigh, Senior Technical Staff, Sierra Leone Railway.
- Haji Ahamed Ismail, Clerk, Grade IV, Somaliland Protectorate.
- Ismail Hussein, Sergeant-Major, Ulaloe Force, Somaliland Protectorate.
- Shirreh Hassan, Senior Somali Medical Assistant, Somaliland Protectorate.
- Abdulla Shamte, Superior Headman of the Rufiji, Tanganyika.
- Gibson Phetembe Mkandawire, Hospital Assistant, Mwanza Training School, Tanganyika.

Basutoland

- Robert Hunter, Head Attendant, Mental Detention Centre, Basutoland.

=== Royal Red Crosses (RRC) ===
- Chief Commander (temporary) Cecile Monica Johnson, ARRC, (206240), Queen Alexandra's Royal Army Nursing Corps.
- Acting Matron Edna Mabel Tilbrook, ARRC, (5058), Princess Mary's Royal Air Force Nursing Service.

==== Associates of the Royal Red Cross (ARRC) ====
- Eileen Mary Mercer, Nursing Sister, Queen Alexandra's Royal Naval Nursing Service.
- Alice Isabel Mitchell, Nursing Sister, Queen Alexandra's Royal Naval Nursing Service.
- Subaltern Nancie May Kinsella (208591), Queen Alexandra's Royal Army Nursing Corps.
- Senior Commander (temporary) Elizabeth Mackaness (206008), Queen Alexandra's Royal Army Nursing Corps.
- Acting Matron Gladys Elsie Chinnery (5071), Princess Mary's Royal Air Force Nursing Service.

=== Air Force Crosses (AFC) ===
Royal Air Force

- Wing Commander Percy Robert Hatfield, DFC, (33315).
- Squadron Leader John Frank Davis, DFC, (78867).
- Squadron Leader Francis George Daw, DFC, (41782).
- Squadron Leader Frederick Ronald Flynn (43618).
- Squadron Leader Peter Westwood Jamieson (65982).
- Squadron Leader Andrew McCallum Johnstone, OBE, (48057).
- Squadron Leader Ernest Waite Wootten, DFC, (42667).
- Acting Squadron Leader John Campbell (120526).
- Acting Squadron Leader Walter Thomas Ellis (110331).
- Acting Squadron Leader John William Simpson Smith, MBE, DFC, (119312).
- Flight Lieutenant James Henry Beddow (56049).
- Flight Lieutenant Denis Walter Bicknell (52152).
- Flight Lieutenant Colin Ian Blyth (199075).
- Flight Lieutenant Percy Field (51963).
- Flight Lieutenant Donovan John Flood, DFC, (56681).
- Flight Lieutenant Donald Gray (181128).
- Flight Lieutenant Douglas Frederick Harvey Grocott (153754).
- Flight Lieutenant Alan Edward Hall (153138).
- Flight Lieutenant Richard Michael Harben (150710).
- Flight Lieutenant John Temperley Hitching (139031).
- Flight Lieutenant Reginald Roland Housby (164774).
- Flight Lieutenant Arthur Johnson (56595).
- Flight Lieutenant Philip Stewart Moules (152779).
- Flight Lieutenant Basil William Parsons (133754).
- Flight Lieutenant Ivor Kenneth Salter (152335).
- Flight Lieutenant Basil James Scandrett (129553).
- Flight Lieutenant Roy Stevenson Smith (126703).
- Flight Lieutenant Laurence William Fraser Stark, DFC, (148445).
- Flight Lieutenant Alexander Steedman (195823).
- Flight Lieutenant Lorne Arthur Paul Tapp, DFC, (59336).
- Flight Lieutenant John Ernest William Teager (158111).
- Flight Lieutenant Hubert Thomas (128512).
- Flight Lieutenant Andrew Finlay Wallace (130169).
- Flight Lieutenant Frank Wyatt Williamson (169667).
- Flight Lieutenant Robert Edward Windle (173807).
- Flying Officer Jack Joseph Duncombe (201647).

Royal Australian Air Force

- Squadron Leader Arthur Ernest Cross (Aus. 150).

South African Air Force.

- Lieutenant Thomas Condon

==== Bars to Air Force Cross ====
Royal Air Force

- Squadron Leader Bryce Gilmore Meharg, AFC, (39941).
- Flight Lieutenant Hugh Glanffrwd James, AFC, DFM, (173932).

Royal Australian Air Force

- Squadron Leader Derek Randal Cuming, AFC, (Aus. 250553).

=== Air Force Medals (AFM) ===
Royal Air Force

- 1182475 Pilot I Alan Bruce Collins.
- 1621355 Pilot I Jack Steam McWicker.
- 578375 Signaller I Royston Joseph Le Feaver.
- 541057 Engineer I Raymond Francis Syrett.
- 573059 Engineer I Geoffrey Ernest Watts.
- 1583781 Pilot II Bruce Sidney Bull.
- 575640 Pilot II Duncan Stokes.
- 4016219 Navigator II John Earle Aitken.
- 1623983 Navigator II Frank Albert Botsford.
- 3036500 Navigator II Ronald Henry Frederick Buckle.
- 1821300 Navigator II John Cairncross.
- 1674974 Navigator II William Oswald Gates.
- 1869621 Signaller II John Henry Gilbert Peardon.
- 160323 Signaller II Russell Henry Clarke.
- 412112 Signaller II Arthur William Kitchenman.
- 549828 Engineer Albert Edward Cowley.

=== King's Commendations for Brave Conduct ===
- 2356695 Aircraftman 1st Class R. M. Templeman, Royal Air Force.

=== King's Commendations for Valuable Service in the Air ===
United Kingdom

- Air Vice-Marshal Donald Clifford Tyndale Bennett, CB, CBE, DSO, Aircraft Captain, Airflight Ltd., Wunstorf.
- William Leslie Clare, Engineer Officer, Lancashire Aircraft Corporation, Schleswigland.
- Ernest Joseph Clark, Flight Engineer, Eagle Aviation, Fuhlsbüttel.
- Captain Leslie Bryan Greensted, MBE, Aircraft Captain, Skyways Ltd., Wunstorf.
- Captain Dennis Hanbury, Pilot, Flight Refuelling Ltd., Wunstorf and Fuhlsbüttel.
- Norman Edward Lee, Radio Officer, Airflight Ltd., Wunstorf.
- Captain John Anthony Batihurst Malvern, Pilot, Flight Refuelling Ltd., Wunstorf and Fuhlsbüttel.
- Captain Gerald Parkinson, Pilot, Airflight Ltd., Wunstorf.
- Captain Malcolm Lancaster Wells, Pilot, Airflight Ltd., Wunstorf.

Royal Air Force

- Squadron Leader M. C. Adderley, AFC, (40973).
- Squadron Leader J. S. Owen (41800).
- Acting Squadron Leader R. B. Cole, DFC, (66483).
- Flight Lieutenant I. G. Barraclough (116441).
- Flight Lieutenant E. Claxton (164160).
- Flight Lieutenant J.R. Cox (163116).
- Flight Lieutenant J. J. Doyle (135735).
- Flight Lieutenant J. W. Everitt (187782).
- Flight Lieutenant H. Goldstone (195386).
- Flight Lieutenant J. R. Leask (57737).
- Flight Lieutenant J. T. Newboult (163108).
- Flight Lieutenant A. J. Sharman (150611).
- Flight Lieutenant W. J. P. Straker (131041).
- Flying Officer R. J. Bance (640295).
- Flying Officer J. F. Dolezal (154303).
- Flying Officer D. E. G. Marlow (58557).
- Flying Officer M. E. Whitworth Jones (57562).
- Master Pilot P. J. McNamara (908211).
- Master Gunner D. G. Tupper (640534).
- 653360 Pilot I W. J. Barton.
- 1179544 Pilot I E. E. Fell.
- 1441086 Pilot I N. C. Hayes.
- 1494057 Navigator I F. J. Baylis, AFM.
- 1624350 Navigator I W. H. Johnson.
- 1316319 Pilot II G. L. Atchison.
- 1616242 Pilot II H. Blair.
- 1896659 Engineer II M. G. Long.
- 4026548 Acting Corporal J. Keighley.

Royal Australian Air Force

- Wing Commander J. Dowling (Aus. 263).
- Flight Lieutenant D. B. Brennan (Aus. 411001).
- Flight Lieutenant R. E. Cormie (Aus. 1430).
- Flight Lieutenant M. M. Heinrich (Aus. 11534).
- Flight Lieutenant C. B. Liebke (Aus. 2616).
- Flight Lieutenant F. J. Montgomery (Aus. 2643).
- Warrant Officer R. D. Bray (Aus. 443977).

=== King's Police and Fire Services Medals (KPFSM) ===
England and Wales

- Norman Frost, Chief Constable, Eastbourne Borough Police Force.
- Cornelius George Looms, Chief Constable, Blackburn Borough Police Force.
- Sydney Bennett, Chief Constable, Bournemouth Borough Police Force.
- Philip Tomkins, Chief Constable, Denbighshire Constabulary.
- Arthur Tom King, Chief Superintendent, Metropolitan Police.
- Frederick Charles Peel, MC, Superintendent, West Sussex Constabulary.
- Tom Pickering, Superintendent, Lancashire Constabulary.
- Lewis John Wilkins, Superintendent, Glamorganshire Constabulary.
- William Snelling Brooks, Superintendent, Berkshire Constabulary.
- Howard Prankish, Superintendent, Birmingham City Police Force.
- Cyril Roy Mitchell Cuthbert, Superintendent, Metropolitan Police.
- George Alfred Morgan, Chief Inspector, Liverpool City Police Force.
- Arthur Harry Spence, BEM, Chief Officer, Northampton Borough Fire Brigade.
- Francis Winteringham, MBE, Chief Officer, Suffolk and Ipswich Combined Fire Brigade.
- Victor William Nelson Botten, MBE, Divisional Officer, London Fire Brigade.
- Harold James Cox, Station Officer (Part-time), Camberley, Surrey Fire Brigade.
- Ernest Walter Marshall, Instructor, Fire Service College.

Scotland

- George Irvine Strath, OBE, Chief Constable, Scottish North-Eastern Counties Constabulary.
- James Hay Goudie, OBE, Chief Constable, Paisley Burgh Police Force.

Northern Ireland

- John Henry Williams, Head Constable, Royal Ulster Constabulary.

Australia

- Frederick George Parmenter, Superintendent 2nd Class, New South Wales Police Force.
- Colin John Delaney, Superintendent 3rd Class, New South Wales Police Force.
- Walter Richard Lawrence, Superintendent 3rd Class, New South Wales Police Force.
- John Charles McCormack, Superintendent 3rd Class, New South Wales Police Force.
- Edward Clifford, Superintendent 3rd Class, New South Wales Police Force.

Colonies, Protectorates, Mandated and Former Mandated Territories

- John Noel Mason Ashplant Nicholls, Assistant Commissioner of Police, Federation of Malaya.
- William Leycester Rouse Carbonnell, Assistant Superintendent of Police, Federation of Malaya.
- Roy James Philip McLaughlan, CPM, Assistant Commissioner of Police, Nigeria.
- William Leslie South, MBE, Assistant Commissioner of Police, Tanganyika.
- Harry Norman Instone, CPM, Superintendent of Police, Kenya.
- James Arnold Sweeney, CPM, Senior Superintendent of Police, Kenya.
- Kenneth Andrew Bidmead, Assistant Commissioner of Police, Hong Kong.
- Geoffrey Studholm Wilson, Assistant Commissioner of Police, Hong Kong.

=== Colonial Police Medals (CPM) ===
In recognition of meritorious service in Malaya and Singapore.

- Abdullah bin Tubah, Sub-Inspector, Federation of Malaya Police Force.
- Abu Bakar bin Ali, Lance Sergeant, Federation of Malaya Police Force.
- Bashah bin Talib, Senior Inspector, Federation of Malaya Police Force.
- Kenneth Francis Dawson, Assistant Superintendent, Federation of Malaya Police Force.
- John Reginald Curtis Denny, Superintendent, Singapore Police Force.
- Claude Henry Fenner, MBE, Assistant Superintendent, Federation of Malaya Police Force.
- Harry James Godsave, European Sergeant, Federation of Malaya Police Force.
- Philip Hemus Hopkins, Volunteer Special Constable, Malayan Police Service.
- Ahmad Khan, Chief Inspector, Singapore Police Force.
- Khawadad Khan, son of Bahadur Khan, Sergeant, Federation of Malaya Police Force.
- David Theodor Lloyd, Honorary Inspector of Auxiliary Police, Federation of Malaya.
- Geoffrey Charles Ripley, Assistant Superintendent, Singapore Police Force.
- Salleh bin Abdul Rahman, Inspector, Federation of Malaya Police Force.
- Kuan Chan Seng, Detective Police Officer (Retired), now serving with Auxiliary Police, Federation of Malaya.
- Ho Kah Shoon, Inspector, Singapore Police Force.
- Pritam Singh, son of Gopal Singh, Sergeant, Federation of Malaya Police Force.
- Robert George Smith, Assistant Superintendent, Federation of Malaya Police Force.
- Talip bin Lisut, Assistant Superintendent, Federation of Malaya Police Force.
- George Devonshire Treble, Honorary Inspector of Auxiliary Police, Federation of Malaya.
- Forbes Wallace, Superintendent, Federation of Malaya Police Force.
- Noel Makepeace Warmington, Honorary Inspector of Auxiliary Police, Federation of Malaya.

== India ==
=== Knights Bachelor ===
- Cecil Russell Trevor, CIE, Deputy Governor, Reserve Bank of India.

=== Order of the Bath ===
==== Knights Commander of the Order of the Bath (KCB) ====
Military Division

- Vice-Admiral William Edward Parry, CB.

=== Order of the British Empire ===
==== Knights Commander of the Order of the British Empire (KBE) ====
Military Division

- Lieutenant-General (temporary) Dudley Russell, CB, CBE, DSO, MC, (A.I.451), late Indian Army.

Civil Division

- Harold Charles Papworth, OBE, Vice-Chancellor, Travancore University.

==== Commanders of the Order of the British Empire (CBE) ====
Military Division

- Captain (Commodore 2nd Class) Henry Norman Scott Brown, OBE, Royal Navy.
- Brigadier (temporary) Nigel John Buchanan Stuart, MBE, (A.I.499), late Indian Army.

Civil Division

- Major Norman Jesse Boxall, deputy director of Ordnance Factories, Directorate of Ordnance Factories, Calcutta.
- Norman Barraclough, OBE, Chief Inspector of Mines.

==== Officers of the Order of the British Empire (OBE) ====
Military Division

- Lieutenant-Colonel William Byrne, MBE, (E.C.1617), 11th Sikh Regiment.
- Acting Group Captain Gordon Charles Allen, Royal Air Force.
- Acting Group Captain William Arthur Harry Cullum, Royal Air Force.

Civil Division

- Maureen Helen Susan, Lady Bucher, MBE, President, Indian Forces Welfare Ladies Committee.
- Christopher Macaulay Bennett, Secretary to the Government of Orissa, Public Works Department, and Chief Engineer (Roads and Buildings), Indian Service of Engineers.
- Edward Charles Peter Garrat Jan Hessing, MBE, Special Officer of National Cadet Corps, Education Department, West Bengal.

==== Members of the Order of the British Empire (MBE) ====
Military Division

- Acting Shipwright Lieutenant Ronald Bryan Fielder, Royal Navy.
- Major (acting) Walter Henry Cliff (C.C.50), Indian Army Corps of Clerks.
- Major (temporary) Alfred Godfrey Hicks. (E.C.6849), 5th Mahratta Light Infantry.

Civil Division

- Allan Dudley Wilks, Superintendent, Ordnance Factory, Katni.

=== King's Police and Fire Services Medals (KPFSM) ===
- Shri Neeli Appalanarasiah, District Superintendent of Police (Officiating), Madras.
- Shri Sukumar Gupta, Indian Police, Inspector-General of Police, West Bengal.
- Shri Dinesh Chandra Chanda, Assistant Commissioner of Police (Officiating), Criminal Intelligence Section, Detective Department, Calcutta.
- Shri Rama Akhandaleshvar Prasad Sinha, Indian Police, Superintendent of Police, Provincial Transport Commissioner, Bihar, Patna.
- Mario Claude Clerici, MBE, Indian Police, Superintendent of Police, Ganjam, Orissa.
- Shri Khagendra Nath Mukerjee, Superintendent of Police (Officiating), Special Police Establishment, Calcutta.

== Ceylon ==
=== Knights Bachelor ===
- Frank Arnold Gunasekera, CBE, ED, MRCS, LRCP, LMS, Senator.
- Alan Edward Percival Rose, KC, Attorney-General.

=== Order of Saint Michael and Saint George ===
==== Companions of the Order of St Michael and St George (CMG) ====
- Herbert Kenneth De Kretser, MICE. For public services.

=== Order of the British Empire ===
==== Commanders of the Order of the British Empire (CBE) ====
Civil Division

- Ukwatte Acharige Jayasundera, KC, Senator.
- Tom Neville Wynne-Jones, OBE, FRIBA, Chief Architect, Public Works Department.
- Ian Froome Wilson, MC, Surveyor-General.

==== Officers of the Order of the British Empire (OBE) ====
Military Division

- Lieutenant-Colonel Frederick Cecil de Saram, MBE, Ceylon Garrison Artillery.
- Lieutenant-Colonel Hemachandra Wickrama Gerard Wijeyekoon, Ceylon Light Infantry.

Civil Division

- Simon Frederick Amerasinghe, JP. For services to the Co-operative Movement.
- Panagodage Bertram Fernand, MB, BS, MRCP, LMS, Professor of Medicine, University of Ceylon.
- William Alexander Guthrie, FRSA, MICE, deputy director of Irrigation.
- Adeline, Lady Molamure, Senator.
- Senarath Paranavithana, Archaeological Commissioner.
- Alfred Eaton Spaar, LRCP, FRCS (Ed.), LMS, Medical Practitioner, Kandy.

==== Members of the Order of the British Empire (MBE) ====
Military Division

- Major Leslie Percival Hayward, Ceylon Planters Rifle Corps.
- Major Mohandirange Don Simon Jayawardena, ED, LRCP, LRCS (Ed.), LRFPS, LMS, Ceylon Medical Corps (Reserve).

Civil Division

- Julian Granville Claessen, MIMechE, Factory Engineer, Government Factory, Public Works Department.
- Nicholas De Alwis. For public service in Bentota.
- Evelyn Johanna Publina, Lady de Soysa. For social services.
- Warushahennedige Aaron Fernando For services to transport in the Panadura district.
- Ida Moonemalle Goonewardene. For social services in Kurunegala District.
- Leslie Norman Peries, Deputy Inspector-General of Police.
- John Marcus Senaveratna. For services to the study of the history of Ceylon.
- Warusahennedige Abraham Bastian Soysa, Senator, and Mayor of Kandy.
- William James Albert Van Langenberg, acting director of Industries.
