= Rosenthal =

Rosenthal is a German and Jewish surname meaning "rose valley". The Lithuanized form is 'Rosenthalis'. Notable people with the name include:

== A ==
- Abe M. Rosenthal (1922–2006), New York Times editor and columnist
- Albert Rosenthal (1863–1939), American portrait artist
- Albert J. Rosenthal (1919–2010), American legal scholar
- Albi Rosenthal (1914–2004), German-born English bookseller and Mozart scholar, grandson of Jacques R., father of Jim R., grandfather of Tom R.
- Amy Krouse Rosenthal (1965–2017), American author
- Arthur Rosenthal (1887–1959), German mathematician

== B ==
- Barbara Rosenthal (born 1948), artist and writer
- Ben Rosenthal (baseball) (born 1979), American baseball coach
- Benjamin Stanley Rosenthal, United States Congressman (1962–1983)
- Bernard "Tony" Rosenthal (1914–2009), American abstract sculptor
- Bernard Rosenthal (scholar), American scholar of the Salem witchcraft trials

== C ==
- Sir Charles Rosenthal (1875–1954), Australian general of World War I
- Chuck Rosenthal (district attorney), Republican District Attorney of Harris County, Texas
- Constantin Daniel Rosenthal, Wallachian painter and revolutionary

== D ==
- Daniel Rosenthal, American politician
- David Rosenthal (disambiguation), multiple people
- Dean Rosenthal, American composer
- Denise Rosenthal, Chilean actress, singer, and songwriter
- Dietmar Rosenthal, Russian linguist
- Doreen Rosenthal (born 1938), Australian psychologist, adolescent health and HIV/AIDS researcher

== E ==
- Ed Rosenthal, author and publisher arrested for use of medical marijuana
- Edward Rosenthal (1914–1991), American businessman
- Elisabeth Rosenthal, American physician and journalist
- Eric Rosenthal (1905–1983), South African historian and writer
- Erwin Rosenthal (1904–1991), German-born British Hebrew scholar and orientalist

== F ==
- François Rozenthal, French ice hockey player
- Frank "Lefty" Rosenthal, Las Vegas entrepreneur
- Franz Rosenthal (1914–2003), scholar of Arabic literature and Islam

== G ==
- Gerry Rosenthal, American actor and musician
- Gert Rosenthal, Guatemalan statesman
- Gregory Samantha Rosenthal, American historian and writer

== H ==
- Hannah Rosenthal, politician active in Jewish causes
- Hans Rosenthal (1925–1987), German television presenter
- Harald Rosenthal, German marine biologist
- Harold Rosenthal, British music critic
- Harold Wallace Rosenthal, administrative assistant of senator Jacob K. Javits
- Haskell P. Rosenthal (1940–2021), American mathematician
- Heinrich Rosenthal (1846–1916), Estonian nationalist leader, doctor and author
- Helen Rosenthal, American politician
- Horst Rosenthal (1915–1942), German-born French cartoonist of Jewish descent

== I ==
- Ida Rosenthal, bra designer and co-founder of Maidenform
- Ilena Rosenthal, breast implant activist

== J ==
- Jack Rosenthal, British playwright and television writer
- Jacques Rosenthal (1854–1937), German bookseller, grandfather of Albi R.
- Jaime Rosenthal, Honduran banker and politician
- Jan Rosenthal (born 1986), German footballer
- Jane Rosenthal, film producer
- Jean Rosenthal (1912–1969), pioneer of theatrical lighting design
- Jeff Rosenthal, Canadian statistician and author
- Jenna Rosenthal, American volleyball player
- Jessica Rosenthal (born 1992), German politician
- Jim Rosenthal (born 1947), UK sports presenter, son of Albi R.
- Joe Rosenthal, American photographer

== K ==
- Ken Rosenthal, American sportswriter and reporter

== L ==
- Laurence Rosenthal, film and television composer
- Leah Rosenthal (1879–1930), Australian nurse who served in World War I
- Linda Rosenthal, American politician
- Lillian Rosenthal, American singer
- Lukas Rosenthal, German rugby union player

== M ==
- Manuel Rosenthal (1904–2003), French composer and conductor
- Marc Rosenthal, American singer-songwriter
- Márk Rózsavölgyi, Hungarian violinist and composer, the father of csárdás, born Mordecai Rosenthal
- Maurice Rozenthal (born 1975), French ice hockey player
- Mike Rosenthal (born 1977), American football player
- Moriz Rosenthal, Polish-American pianist
- Moshe Rosenthalis (1922–2008), Lithuanian-Israeli painter and an art teacher

== N ==
- Norman E. Rosenthal, South African author

== P ==
- Paul Rosenthal (Colorado politician), American politician
- Paul Rosenthal (Minnesota politician), American politician
- Paul Rosenthal (violinist), American violinist
- Pauline Emmanuel Rosenthal, German composer
- Peter Rosenthal, Toronto mathematician and lawyer
- Phil Rosenthal (columnist) (born 1963), formerly at the Chicago Tribune
- Philip Rosenthal (born 1960), television producer

== R ==
- Richard Rosenthal (disambiguation), multiple people
- Rick Rosenthal, American film director
- Robert Rosenthal (disambiguation), multiple people
- Ronny Rosenthal (born 1963), Israeli footballer

== S ==
- Samuel Rosenthal, Polish-French chess master
- Sam Rosenthal, American musician
- Sanford Rosenthal, American scientist
- Sean Rosenthal (born 1980), American beach volleyball player
- Sebastián Rozental (born 1976), Chilean professional soccer player

== T ==
- Ted Rosenthal (born 1959), American jazz pianist, composer and educator
- Trevor Rosenthal, American baseball pitcher
- Tom Rosenthal, British musician
- Tom Rosenthal (born 1988), British actor and comedian, son of Jim R.

== U ==
- Uri Rosenthal (born 1945), Dutch politician and political scientist, Minister of Foreign Affairs (2010–2012)

== Y ==
- Yosef Rosenthal (1844–1913), Hebrew writer

== See also ==
- Rosendahl (disambiguation)
- Rosenthal Islands, Antarctica
