= April 20 =

April 20 this year in various calendars
- Monday, 20 April 2026
Akan	Kurudwo
Armenian	4 Mareri 1475
Aztec	Tlaxochimaco 20, 10 Tōchtli
Babylonian	2 Nisanu, 2337 SE
Balinese pawukon	Luang, Pepet, Pasah, Menala, Paing, Paniron, Coma of Ukir, Uma, Nohan, Duka
Bengali	7 Boisakh, BS 1433
Chinese	Yang Wood Rat・Net Mansion; Fire Horse Year, Month 3, Day 4 (Guyu, 15 days until Lixia)
Common Era	20 April 2026 CE
Coptic	12 Parmouti, AM 1742
Egyptian	4 Thoth, 2775 NE
Ethiopian	12 Miyāzyā, 2018 Amätä Məhrät
French Republican	Décade I, Primidi de Floréal de l'Année 234 de la République
Gregorian	20 April, AD 2026
Hebrew	3 Iyar, AM 5786; Omer 18
Hindu	Kṛttikā・Saubhāgya; Solar: 7 Vaiśākha, 1948 SE; Lunisolar: Tr̥tīyā, Śukla pakṣa of Vaiśākha, 2083 VE; Rāudra・5127 KY・1,872,685
Icelandic	Mánudagur, 28 Einmánuður 2025
Islamic	3 Dhu al-Qi'dah, AH 1447 (using tabular method)
ISO week date	2026-W17-1
Japanese	4 Yayoi, Reiwa 8 (Kokuu, 15 days until Rikka)
Julian	7 April, AD 2026 (AM 7534)
Julian day	2461151
Korean	4 Yongdal, 4359 DE
Maya	13.0.13.9.8; 1 Uo, 10 Lamat
Roman	ante diem VII Idus Apriles, MMDCCLXXIX AUC
Solar Hijri	31 Farvardin, SH 1405
Tibetan	3 nag pa, me pho rta 2153 or 1772 or 1000

<<	April					>>
Su	Mo	Tu	We	Th	Fr	Sa
			1	2	3	4
5	6	7	8	9	10	11
12	13	14	15	16	17	18
19	20	21	22	23	24	25
26	27	28	29	30
2026

April 20 in recent years
2026 (Monday)
2025 (Sunday)
2024 (Saturday)
2023 (Thursday)
2022 (Wednesday)
2021 (Tuesday)
2020 (Monday)
2019 (Saturday)
2018 (Friday)
2017 (Thursday)

April 20 is the 110th day of the year (111th in leap years) in the Gregorian calendar; 255 days remain until the end of the year.

== Events ==
=== Pre-1600 ===
- 1152 – After an eight-year conflict, Baldwin III of Jerusalem wins sole control of the Kingdom of Jerusalem from his mother Melisende.
- 1303 – The Sapienza University of Rome is instituted by a bull of Pope Boniface VIII.
- 1303 – The Bahri Mamluks defeat the Ilkhanate in the battle of Marj al-Saffar, marking the end of the Mongol incursions into Syria.
- 1535 – A complex halo display is observed over Stockholm, Sweden, inspiring the Vädersolstavlan ("The Sundog painting"), the earliest depiction of such an event, and the oldest colour depiction of the city.

=== 1601–1900 ===
- 1653 – Oliver Cromwell dissolves England's Rump Parliament.
- 1657 – English Admiral Robert Blake destroys a Spanish silver fleet, under heavy fire from the shore, at the Battle of Santa Cruz de Tenerife.
- 1657 – Freedom of religion is granted to the Jews of New Amsterdam (later New York City).
- 1752 – Start of Konbaung–Hanthawaddy War, a new phase in the Burmese Civil War (1740–57).
- 1770 – The Georgian king, Erekle II, abandoned by his Russian ally Count Totleben, wins a victory over Ottoman forces at Aspindza.
- 1789 – George Washington arrives at Grays Ferry, Philadelphia, while en route to Manhattan for his inauguration.
- 1792 – France declares war against the "King of Hungary and Bohemia", the beginning of the French Revolutionary Wars.
- 1800 – The Septinsular Republic is established.
- 1809 – Two Austrian army corps in Bavaria are defeated by a First French Empire army led by Napoleon at the Battle of Abensberg on the second day of a four-day campaign that ended in a French victory.
- 1828 – René Caillié becomes the second non-Muslim to enter Timbuktu, following Major Gordon Laing. He would also be the first to return alive.
- 1836 – U.S. Congress passes an act creating the Wisconsin Territory.
- 1861 – American Civil War: Robert E. Lee resigns his commission in the United States Army in order to command the forces of the state of Virginia.
- 1861 – Thaddeus S. C. Lowe, attempting to display the value of balloons, makes record journey, flying 900 miles from Cincinnati to South Carolina.
- 1862 – Louis Pasteur and Claude Bernard complete the experiment disproving the theory of spontaneous generation.
- 1865 – Astronomer Angelo Secchi demonstrates the Secchi disk, which measures water clarity, aboard Pope Pius IX's yacht, the L'Immaculata Concezion.
- 1876 – The April Uprising begins. Its suppression shocks European opinion, and Bulgarian independence becomes a condition for ending the Russo-Turkish War.
- 1884 – Pope Leo XIII publishes the encyclical Humanum genus, condemning Freemasonry.
- 1898 – U.S. President William McKinley signs a joint resolution to Congress for declaration of war against Spain, beginning the Spanish–American War.

=== 1901–present ===
- 1902 – Pierre and Marie Curie refine radium chloride.
- 1908 – Opening day of competition in the New South Wales Rugby League.
- 1914 – Nineteen men, women, and children participating in a strike are killed in the Ludlow Massacre during the Colorado Coalfield War.
- 1918 – World War I: Manfred von Richthofen, a.k.a. The Red Baron, shoots down his 79th and 80th victims, his final victories before his death the following day.
- 1922 – The Soviet government creates the South Ossetian Autonomous Oblast within the Georgian SSR.
- 1945 – World War II: U.S. troops capture Leipzig, Germany, only to later cede the city to the Soviet Union.
- 1945 – World War II: Führerbunker: On his 56th birthday Adolf Hitler makes his last trip to the surface to award Iron Crosses to boy soldiers of the Hitler Youth.
- 1945 – Twenty Jewish children used in medical experiments at Neuengamme are killed in the basement of the Bullenhuser Damm school.
- 1946 – The League of Nations officially dissolves, giving most of its power to the United Nations.
- 1949 – Amethyst incident: The People's Liberation Army attacks HMS Amethyst (F116) travelling to the British embassy in Nanjing during the Chinese Civil War.
- 1961 – Cold War: Failure of the Bay of Pigs Invasion of US-backed Cuban exiles against Cuba.
- 1968 – English politician Enoch Powell makes his controversial "Rivers of Blood" speech.
- 1968 – South African Airways Flight 228 crashes near J.G. Strijdom Airport in South West Africa (now Hosea Kutako International Airport in Namibia), killing 123 people.
- 1972 – Apollo program: The Apollo 16 Lunar Module Orion, commanded by John Young and piloted by Charles Duke, lands on the Moon.
- 1985 – University of California, Riverside 1985 laboratory raid: Animal Liberation Front rescues 467 animals being tested in a lab at University of California, Riverside in Riverside, California, causing $700,000 in damages to the laboratory, in advocacy for animal rights.
- 1998 – Air France Flight 422 crashes after taking off from El Dorado International Airport in Bogotá, Colombia, killing all 53 people on board.
- 1999 – Columbine High School massacre: Eric Harris and Dylan Klebold kill 14 people and injure 23 others before committing suicide at Columbine High School in Columbine, Colorado.
- 2004 – The Nicoll Highway in Singapore collapses, killing four workers.
- 2007 – Johnson Space Center shooting: William Phillips barricades himself with a handgun in NASA's Johnson Space Center in Houston, Texas, before killing a male hostage and himself.
- 2008 – Danica Patrick wins the Indy Japan 300, becoming the first female driver in history to win an Indy car race.
- 2010 – The Deepwater Horizon drilling rig explodes in the Gulf of Mexico, killing eleven workers and beginning an oil spill that lasted six months.
- 2012 – One hundred twenty-seven people are killed when a plane crashes in a residential area near the Benazir Bhutto International Airport near Islamabad, Pakistan.
- 2013 – A 6.6-magnitude earthquake strikes Lushan County, Ya'an, in China's Sichuan province, killing at least 193 people and injuring thousands.
- 2015 – Ten people are killed in a bomb attack on a convoy carrying food supplies to a United Nations compound in Garowe in the Somali region of Puntland.
- 2020 – For the first time in history, oil prices drop below zero, an effect of the 2020 Russia-Saudi Arabia oil price war.
- 2021 – State of Minnesota v. Derek Michael Chauvin: Derek Chauvin is found guilty of all charges in the murder of George Floyd by the Fourth Judicial District Court of Minnesota.
- 2023 – SpaceX's Starship rocket, the largest and most powerful rocket ever built, launches for the first time. It explodes four minutes into flight.

== Births ==
=== Pre-1600 ===
- 1494 – Johannes Agricola, German theologian and reformer (died 1566)
- 1544 – Renata of Lorraine, Duchess consort of Bavaria (died 1602)
- 1586 – Rose of Lima, Peruvian mystic and saint (died 1617)

=== 1601–1900 ===
- 1619 – Geoffrey Shakerley, English politician (died 1696)
- 1633 – Emperor Go-Kōmyō of Japan (died 1654)
- 1646 – Charles Plumier, French botanist and author (died 1704)
- 1650 – William Bedloe, English spy (died 1680)
- 1718 – David Brainerd, American missionary (died 1747)
- 1723 – Cornelius Harnett, American merchant, farmer, and politician (died 1781)
- 1727 – Florimond Claude, Comte de Mercy-Argenteau, Belgian-Austrian minister and diplomat (died 1794)
- 1745 – Philippe Pinel, French physician and psychiatrist (died 1826)
- 1748 – Georg Michael Telemann, German composer and theologian (died 1831)
- 1808 – Napoleon III, French politician, 1st President of France, Emperor of French Second Empire (died 1873)
- 1816 – Bogoslav Šulek, Croatian philologist, historian, and lexicographer (died 1895)
- 1818 – Heinrich Göbel, German-American mechanic and engineer (died 1893)
- 1826 – Dinah Craik, English author and poet (died 1887)
- 1839 – Carol I of Romania, King of Romania (died 1914)
- 1840 – Odilon Redon, French painter and illustrator (died 1916)
- 1848 - Kurd Lasswitz, author and physician (died 1910)
- 1850 – Daniel Chester French, American sculptor, designed the Lincoln statue (died 1931)
- 1851 – Alexander Dianin, Russian chemist (died 1918)
- 1851 – Siegmund Lubin, Polish-American businessman, founded the Lubin Manufacturing Company (died 1923)
- 1860 – Justinien de Clary, French target shooter (died 1933)
- 1871 – Sydney Chapman, English economist and civil servant (died 1951)
- 1873 – James Harcourt, English character actor (died 1951)
- 1875 – Vladimir Vidrić, Croatian poet and lawyer (died 1909)
- 1879 – Paul Poiret, French fashion designer (died 1944)
- 1882 – Holland Smith, American general (died 1967)
- 1884 – Princess Beatrice of Saxe-Coburg and Gotha (died 1966)
- 1884 – Oliver Kirk, American boxer (died 1960)
- 1884 – Daniel Varoujan, Armenian poet and educator (died 1915)
- 1889 – Albert Jean Amateau, Turkish rabbi, lawyer, and activist (died 1996)
- 1889 – Prince Erik, Duke of Västmanland (died 1918)
- 1889 – Marie-Antoinette de Geuser, French mystic (died 1918)
- 1889 – Adolf Hitler, Austrian-born German politician, Führer of Nazi Germany (died 1945)
- 1889 – Tonny Kessler, Dutch footballer (died 1960)
- 1890 – Maurice Duplessis, Canadian lawyer and politician, 16th Premier of Quebec (died 1959)
- 1890 – Adolf Schärf, Austrian soldier and politician, 6th President of Austria (died 1965)
- 1891 – Dave Bancroft, American baseball player and manager (died 1972)
- 1893 – Harold Lloyd, American actor, comedian, and producer (died 1971)
- 1893 – Joan Miró, Spanish painter and sculptor (died 1983)
- 1895 – Henry de Montherlant, French essayist, novelist, and dramatist (died 1972)
- 1899 – Alan Arnett McLeod, Canadian lieutenant, Victoria Cross recipient (died 1918)

=== 1901–present ===
- 1904 – Bruce Cabot, American actor (died 1972)
- 1907 – Miran Bakhsh, Pakistani cricketer (died 1991)
- 1907 – Augoustinos Kantiotes, Greek bishop (died 2010)
- 1908 – Lionel Hampton, American vibraphone player, pianist, bandleader, and actor (died 2002)
- 1910 – Fatin Rüştü Zorlu, Turkish diplomat and politician (died 1961)
- 1913 – Mimis Fotopoulos, Greek actor and poet (died 1986)
- 1913 – Willi Hennig, German biologist and entomologist (died 1976)
- 1914 – Betty Lou Gerson, American actress (died 1999)
- 1915 – Joseph Wolpe, South African psychotherapist and physician (died 1997)
- 1915 – Israel Epstein, Chinese-Polish journalist and member of the Chinese Communist Party (died 2005)
- 1916 – Yoko Matsuoka, Japanese writer (died 1979)
- 1916 – Nasiba Zeynalova, Azerbaijani actress (died 2004)
- 1918 – Kai Siegbahn, Swedish physicist and academic, Nobel Prize laureate (died 2007)
- 1919 – Richard Hillary, Australian lieutenant and pilot (died 1943)
- 1920 – Frances Ames, South African neurologist, psychiatrist, and human rights activist (died 2002)
- 1920 – Clement Isong, Nigerian banker and politician, Governor of Cross River State (died 2000)
- 1920 – John Paul Stevens, American lawyer and jurist, Associate Justice of the Supreme Court of the United States (died 2019)
- 1921 – Katarína Kolníková, Slovak actress (died 2006)
- 1923 – Mother Angelica, American nun and broadcaster, founded Eternal Word Television Network (died 2016)
- 1923 – Irene Lieblich, Polish-American painter and illustrator (died 2008)
- 1923 – Tito Puente, American drummer and producer (died 2000)
- 1924 – Nina Foch, Dutch-American actress (died 2008)
- 1924 – Leslie Phillips, English actor and producer (died 2022)
- 1924 – Guy Rocher, Canadian sociologist and academic (died 2025)
- 1925 – Ernie Stautner, German-American football player and coach (died 2006)
- 1925 – Elena Verdugo, American actress (died 2017)
- 1927 – Bud Cullen, Canadian judge and politician, 1st Canadian Minister of Employment and Immigration (died 2005)
- 1927 – Phil Hill, American race car driver (died 2008)
- 1927 – K. Alex Müller, Swiss physicist and academic, Nobel Prize laureate (died 2023)
- 1928 – Robert Byrne, American chess player and author (died 2013)
- 1928 – Johnny Gavin, Irish international footballer (died 2007)
- 1930 – Dwight Gustafson, American composer and conductor (died 2014)
- 1930 – Antony Jay, English director and screenwriter (died 2016)
- 1931 – Michael Allenby, 3rd Viscount Allenby, English lieutenant and politician (died 2014)
- 1931 – John Eccles, 2nd Viscount Eccles, English businessman and politician
- 1932 – Myriam Bru, French actress
- 1936 – Pauli Ellefsen, Faroese technician, surveyor, and politician, 6th Prime Minister of the Faroe Islands (died 2012)
- 1936 – Pat Roberts, American captain, journalist, and politician
- 1937 – Jiří Dienstbier, Czech journalist and politician, Czech Minister of Foreign Affairs (died 2011)
- 1937 – Harvey Quaytman, American painter and educator (died 2002)
- 1937 – George Takei, American actor
- 1938 – Betty Cuthbert, Australian sprinter (died 2017)
- 1938 – Manfred Kinder, German runner
- 1938 – Eszter Tamási, Hungarian actress (died 1991)
- 1938 – Johnny Tillotson, American singer-songwriter (died 2025)
- 1939 – Peter S. Beagle, American author and screenwriter
- 1939 – Gro Harlem Brundtland, Norwegian physician and politician, 22nd Prime Minister of Norway–
- 1940 – James Gammon, American actor (died 2010)
- 1941 – Ryan O'Neal, American actor (died 2023)
- 1943 – Alan Beith, English academic and politician
- 1943 – John Eliot Gardiner, English conductor and director
- 1943 – Edie Sedgwick, American model and actress (died 1971)
- 1944 – Toivo Aare, Estonian journalist and author (died 1999)
- 1945 – Michael Brandon, American actor and director
- 1945 – Olga Karlatos, Greek actress and Bermudian lawyer
- 1945 – Thein Sein, Burmese general and politician, 8th President of Burma
- 1945 – Naftali Temu, Kenyan runner (died 2003)
- 1945 – Steve Spurrier, American football player and coach
- 1946 – Sandro Chia, Italian painter and sculptor
- 1947 – Rita Dionne-Marsolais, Canadian economist and politician
- 1947 – Viktor Suvorov, Russian intelligence officer, historian, and author
- 1947 – Niko Lekishvili, Georgian politician (died 2025)
- 1948 – Matthias Kuhle, German geographer and academic (died 2015)
- 1949 – Veronica Cartwright, English-American actress
- 1949 – Toller Cranston, Canadian-Mexican figure skater and painter (died 2015)
- 1949 – Massimo D'Alema, Italian journalist and politician, 76th Prime Minister of Italy
- 1949 – Jessica Lange, American actress
- 1950 – Alexander Lebed, Russian general and politician (died 2002)
- 1950 – N. Chandrababu Naidu, Indian politician, 13th Chief Minister of Andhra Pradesh
- 1951 – Luther Vandross, American singer-songwriter and producer (died 2005)
- 1952 – Louka Katseli, Greek economist and politician
- 1953 – Sebastian Faulks, English journalist and author
- 1953 – James Chance, American musician (died 2024)
- 1955 – Olivia Dahl (died 1962), daughter of Roald Dahl and Patricia Neal
- 1955 – Donald Pettit, American engineer and astronaut
- 1955 – Svante Pääbo, Swedish geneticist and Nobel Laureate
- 1956 – Beatrice Ask, Swedish politician, Swedish Minister for Justice
- 1956 – Peter Chelsom, English film director, writer, and actor
- 1956 – Kakha Bendukidze, Georgian economist and politician (died 2014)
- 1958 – Viacheslav Fetisov, Russian ice hockey player and coach
- 1959 – Perry Haddock, Australian rugby league player
- 1960 – Debbie Flintoff-King, Australian hurdler and coach
- 1961 – Don Mattingly, American baseball player, coach, and manager
- 1961 – Konstantin Lavronenko, Russian actor
- 1962 – Sanjaasürengiin Zorig, Mongolian Politician, (died 1998)
- 1963 – Rachel Whiteread, English sculptor
- 1964 – John Carney, American football player
- 1964 – Crispin Glover, American actor and filmmaker
- 1964 – Andy Serkis, English actor and director
- 1964 – Rosalynn Sumners, American figure skater
- 1965 – Kostis Chatzidakis, Greek politician, Ministry of Economy, Infrastructure, Shipping and Tourism
- 1965 – Léa Fazer, Swiss film director, screenwriter and actress
- 1965 – Mark Mallia, Maltese painter and sculptor (died 2024)
- 1966 – David Chalmers, Australian philosopher and academic
- 1966 – David Filo, American businessman, co-founded Yahoo!
- 1967 – Lara Jill Miller, American actress
- 1967 – Mike Portnoy, American drummer and songwriter
- 1968 – Julia Morris, Australian entertainer
- 1969 – Felix Baumgartner, Austrian daredevil (died 2025)
- 1969 – Will Hodgman, Australian politician, 45th Premier of Tasmania
- 1970 – Shemar Moore, American actor
- 1971 – Allan Houston, American basketball player
- 1971 – Mikey Welsh, American bassist and painter (died 2011)
- 1972 – Carmen Electra, American model and actress
- 1972 – Stephen Marley, Jamaican-American musician
- 1973 – Julie Powell, American food writer and memoirist (died 2022)
- 1974 – Randy Fine, American politician and former gambling industry executive
- 1975 – Killer Mike, American rapper
- 1978 – Carl Greenidge, English cricketer
- 1980 – Emma Husar, Australian politician
- 1983 – Miranda Kerr, Australian model
- 1984 – Harris Wittels, American comedian (died 2015)
- 1987 – Jorge Pinto, Portuguese politician
- 1988 – Brandon Belt, American baseball player
- 1989 – Vannesa Rosales, Venezuelan activist and teacher
- 1990 – Kyle Higashioka, American baseball player
- 1990 – Jason Behrendorff, Australian cricketer
- 1991 – Luke Kuechly, American football player
- 1997 – Alexander Zverev, German tennis player
- 2005 – Tallyn Da Silva, Australian rugby league player

== Deaths ==
=== Pre-1600 ===
- 689 – Cædwalla, king of Wessex (born 659)
- 888 – Xi Zong, Chinese emperor (born 862)
- 1099 – Peter Bartholomew (born 1061)
- 1164 – Antipope Victor IV
- 1176 – Richard de Clare, 2nd Earl of Pembroke, English-Irish politician, Lord Chief Justice of Ireland (born 1130)
- 1248 – Güyük Khan, Mongol ruler, 3rd Great Khan of the Mongol Empire (born 1206)
- 1284 – Hōjō Tokimune, regent of Japan (born 1251)
- 1314 – Pope Clement V (born 1264)
- 1322 – Simon Rinalducci, Italian Augustinian friar
- 1344 – Gersonides, French Jewish philosopher, Talmudist, mathematician, physician, and astronomer (born 1288)
- 1502 – Mary of Looz-Heinsberg, Dutch noble (born 1424)
- 1521 – Zhengde, Chinese emperor (born 1491)
- 1534 – Elizabeth Barton, English nun and martyr (born 1506)
- 1558 – Johannes Bugenhagen, German priest and theologian (born 1485)

=== 1601–1900 ===
- 1643 – Christoph Demantius, German composer and poet (born 1567)
- 1703 – Lancelot Addison, English clergyman and educator (born 1632)
- 1769 – Chief Pontiac, American tribal leader (born 1720)
- 1831 – John Abernethy, English surgeon and anatomist (born 1764)
- 1873 – William Tite, English architect, designed the Royal Exchange (born 1798)
- 1874 – Alexander H. Bailey, American lawyer, judge, and politician (born 1817)
- 1881 – William Burges, English architect and designer (born 1827)
- 1886 – Charles-François-Frédéric, marquis de Montholon-Sémonville, French general and diplomat, French ambassador to the United States (born 1814)
- 1887 – Muhammad Sharif Pasha, Greek-Egyptian politician, 2nd Prime Minister of Egypt (born 1826)
- 1899 – Joseph Wolf, German ornithologist and illustrator (born 1820)

=== 1901–present ===
- 1902 – Joaquim de Sousa Andrade, Brazilian poet and educator (born 1833)
- 1912 – Bram Stoker, Anglo-Irish novelist and critic, created Count Dracula (born 1847)
- 1918 – Jussi Merinen, Finnish politician (born 1873)
- 1918 – Karl Ferdinand Braun, German-American physicist and academic, Nobel Prize laureate (born 1850)
- 1927 – Enrique Simonet, Spanish painter and educator (born 1866)
- 1929 – Prince Henry of Prussia (born 1862)
- 1931 – Sir Cosmo Duff-Gordon, 5th Baronet, Scottish-English fencer and businessman (born 1862)
- 1932 – Giuseppe Peano, Italian mathematician and philosopher (born 1858)
- 1935 – John Cameron, Scottish footballer and manager (born 1872)
- 1935 – Lucy, Lady Duff-Gordon, English fashion designer (born 1863)
- 1942 – Jüri Jaakson, Estonian businessman and politician, 6th State Elder of Estonia (born 1870)
- 1944 – Elmer Gedeon, American baseball player and pilot (born 1917)
- 1945 – Erwin Bumke, Polish-German jurist and politician (born 1874)
- 1946 – Mae Busch, Australian actress (born 1891)
- 1947 – Christian X, King of Denmark (born 1870)
- 1951 – Ivanoe Bonomi, Italian politician, 25th Prime Minister of Italy (born 1873)
- 1967 – Léo-Paul Desrosiers, Canadian journalist and author (born 1896)
- 1968 – Rudolph Dirks, German-American illustrator (born 1877)
- 1969 – Vjekoslav Luburić, Croatian Ustaše official and concentration camp administrator (born 1914)
- 1978 – Lord Richard Cecil, British soldier and journalist in the Rhodesian Bush War (born 1948)
- 1980 – M. Canagaratnam, Sri Lankan politician (born 1924)
- 1982 – Archibald MacLeish, American poet, playwright, and lawyer (born 1892)
- 1986 – Sibte Hassan, Pakistani journalist, scholar, and activist (born 1916)
- 1991 – Steve Marriott, English singer-songwriter and producer (born 1947)
- 1991 – Don Siegel, American director and producer (born 1912)
- 1992 – Marjorie Gestring, American springboard diver (born 1922)
- 1992 – Benny Hill, English comedian, actor, and screenwriter (born 1924)
- 1993 – Cantinflas, Mexican actor, producer, and screenwriter (born 1911)
- 1995 – Milovan Đilas, Yugoslav communist, politician, theorist and author (born 1911)
- 1996 – Trần Văn Trà, Vietnamese general and politician (born 1918)
- 1999 – Rick Rude, American professional wrestler (born 1958)
- 1999 – Rachel Scott, American victim of Columbine High School massacre (born 1981)
- 1999 – Cassie Bernall, American victim of Columbine High School massacre (born 1981)
- 2001 – Giuseppe Sinopoli, Italian conductor and composer (born 1946)
- 2002 – Alan Dale, American singer (born 1925)
- 2003 – Bernard Katz, German-English biophysicist and academic, Nobel Prize laureate (born 1911)
- 2004 – Lizzy Mercier Descloux, French musician, singer-songwriter, composer, actress, writer and painter (born 1956)
- 2005 – Fumio Niwa, Japanese journalist and author (born 1904)
- 2007 – Andrew Hill, American pianist, composer, and bandleader (born 1931)
- 2007 – Michael Fu Tieshan, Chinese bishop (born 1931)
- 2007 – Robert Rosenthal World War II B 17 Commander Pilot who also served on the Nuremburg Trials (born 1917)
- 2008 – Monica Lovinescu, Romanian journalist and author (born 1923)
- 2010 – Dorothy Height, American educator and activist (born 1912)
- 2011 – Tim Hetherington, English photographer and journalist (born 1970)
- 2012 – Bert Weedon, English guitarist and songwriter (born 1920)
- 2014 – Neville Wran, Australian politician, 35th Premier of New South Wales (born 1926)
- 2016 – Victoria Wood, British comedian, actress and writer (born 1953)
- 2018 – Avicii, Swedish DJ and musician (born 1989)
- 2021 – Idriss Déby, Chadian politician and military officer (born 1952)
- 2021 – Monte Hellman, American film director (born 1929)
- 2021 – Les McKeown, Scottish pop singer (born 1955)
- 2022 – Gavin Millar, Scottish film director (born 1938)
- 2024 – Antonio Cantafora, Italian film and television actor (born 1944)
- 2024 – Andrew Davis, English conductor (born 1944)
- 2024 – Roman Gabriel, Filipino-American NFL American footballer
- 2024 – Lourdes Portillo, Mexican film director, producer, and writer (born 1943)
- 2025 – Hugo Gatti, Argentine footballer (born 1944)
- 2026 – Luis Brandoni, Argentine actor and politician (born 1940)

== Holidays and observances ==
- Christian feast day:
  - Agnes of Montepulciano
  - Pope Anicetus
  - Blessed Anastazy Jakub Pankiewicz
  - Beuno
  - Blessed James Bell and John Finch
  - Johannes Bugenhagen (Lutheran)
  - Marcellinus of Gaul
  - Blessed Muiris Mac Ionrachtaigh
  - Theotimos
  - April 20 (Eastern Orthodox liturgics)
- 420 (cannabis culture)
- Evacuee Flag Day (Finland)
- UN Chinese Language Day (United Nations)
