= Chappie =

Chappie may refer to:

== People ==
=== Surname ===
- Eugene A. Chappie (1920–1992), United States Congressman

=== Nickname or given name ===
- Jack Blackburn (1883–1942), American boxer and boxing trainer, nicknamed "Chappie" by Joe Louis, his most famous pupil
- Charles Coventry (Zimbabwean cricketer), nicknamed "Chappie"
- Chappie Dwyer (1894–1975), Australian cricketer
- Chappie Fox (1913–2003), American circus historian and philanthropist
- Chappie Geygan (1903–1966), American Major League Baseball shortstop
- Daniel James Jr. (1920–1978), U.S. Air Force fighter pilot, first African American four-star general
- Chappie Johnson (1876–1949), American baseball catcher and field manager in the Negro leagues
- Chappie McFarland (1875–1924), American Major League Baseball pitcher
- Chappie Sheppell, American soccer player from 1934 to 1950
- Chappie Snodgrass (1870–1951), American Major League Baseball outfielder

== Arts and entertainment ==
- Chappie Angulo (born 1928), American-Mexican painter and illustrator, born Ruth Chapman Maruschok
- Chappie (film), a 2015 American science fiction film by Neill Blomkamp
- Chappie, character in the film Chappie, played by Sharlto Copley
- Stanford Chaparral (a.k.a. the Chappie), a humor magazine published by students of Stanford University
- Chappie, protagonist and narrator of the 1995 novel Rule of the Bone by Russell Banks
- Coach Charles "Chappie" Davis, a character played by Sonny Jim Gaines in the 1981 television movie The Sophisticated Gents

== Other uses ==
- Chappie, pet food sold by Pedigree Petfoods
- Chappies, a brand of bubblegum owned by Cadbury
- ChatGPT, nicknamed as Chappie in Japan
- Chappie, a Scottish colloquial name for a door-knocking prank

== See also ==
- Max Miller (comedian) (1894–1963), British front-cloth comedian known as the "Cheeky Chappie"
- Chappy (disambiguation)
