= Waldeck (electoral district) =

German Bundestag constituency

166 Waldeck
- Electoral district for the Bundestag
- Waldeck in 2025
- State: Hesse
- Population: 234,200 (2019)
- Electorate: 184,073 (2021)
- Major settlements: Baunatal; Korbach; Bad Wildungen
- Area: 2,167.3 km^{2}

Current electoral district
- Created: 1949
- Party: CDU
- Member: Jan-Wilhelm Pohlmann
- Elected: 2025

Waldeck is an electoral constituency (German: Wahlkreis) represented in the Bundestag. It elects one member via first-past-the-post voting. Under the current constituency numbering system, it is designated as constituency 166. It is located in northern Hesse, comprising most of the Landkreis Kassel district and the northern part of the Waldeck-Frankenberg district.

Waldeck was created for the inaugural 1949 federal election. From 2017 to 2025, it was represented by Esther Dilcher of the Social Democratic Party (SPD). Since 2025 it has been represented by Jan-Wilhelm Pohlmann of the CDU.

== Geography ==
Waldeck is located in northern Hesse. As of the 2021 federal election, it comprises the entirety of the Landkreis Kassel district excluding the municipalities of Ahnatal, Espenau, Fuldabrück, Fuldatal, Helsa, Kaufungen, Lohfelden, Nieste, Niestetal, Söhrewald, and Vellmar, as well as the entirety of the Waldeck-Frankenberg district excluding the municipalities of Allendorf (Eder), Battenberg (Eder), Bromskirchen, Burgwald, Frankenau, Frankenberg, Gemünden (Wohra), Haina, Hatzfeld, Rosenthal, and Vöhl.

== History ==
Waldeck was created in 1949. In the 1949 election, it was Hesse constituency 1 in the numbering system. From 1953 through 1976, it was number 126. From 1980 through 1998, it was number 124. In the 2002 and 2005 elections, it was number 169. In the 2009 election, it was number 168. In the 2013 through 2021 elections, it was number 167. From the 2025 election, it has been number 166.

Originally, the constituency comprised the districts of Waldeck, Hofgeismar, and Wolfhagen. In the 1972 election, it comprised the Waldeck district and the municipalities of Breuna, Calden, Emstal, Grebenstein, Habichtswald, Hofgeismar, Immenhausen, Karlshafen, Liebenau, Naumburg, Oberweser, Reinhardshagen, Trendelburg, Wahlsburg, Wolfhagen, and Zierenberg from the Landkreis Kassel district. In the 1976 election, it acquired borders very similar to its current configuration, but excluding the Baunatal and Schauenburg municipalities from Landkreis Kassel district. It acquired its current borders in the 2002 election.

Election	No.	Name	Borders
1949	1	Waldeck	Waldeck district; Hofgeismar district; Wolfhagen district
1953	126	Waldeck	Waldeck district; Hofgeismar district; Wolfhagen district
1957	126	Waldeck	Waldeck district; Hofgeismar district; Wolfhagen district
1961	126	Waldeck	Waldeck district; Hofgeismar district; Wolfhagen district
1965	126	Waldeck	Waldeck district; Hofgeismar district; Wolfhagen district
1969	126	Waldeck	Waldeck district; Hofgeismar district; Wolfhagen district
1972	126	Waldeck	Waldeck district; Landkreis Kassel district (only Breuna, Calden, Emstal, Grebenstein, Habichtswald, Hofgeismar, Immenhausen, Karlshafen, Liebenau, Naumburg, Oberweser, Reinhardshagen, Trendelburg, Wahlsburg, Wolfhagen, and Zierenberg municipalities)
1976	126	Waldeck	Landkreis Kassel district (excluding Ahnatal, Baunatal, Espenau, Fuldabrück, Fuldatal, Helsa, Kaufungen, Lohfelden, Nieste, Niestetal, Schauenburg, Söhrewald, and Vellmar municipalities); Waldeck-Frankenberg district (excluding Allendorf (Eder), Battenberg (Eder), Bromskirchen, Burgwald, Frankenau, Frankenberg (Eder), Gemünden (Wohra), Haina (Kloster), Hatzfeld (Eder), Rosenthal, and Vöhl municipalities)
1980	124	Waldeck	Landkreis Kassel district (excluding Ahnatal, Baunatal, Espenau, Fuldabrück, Fuldatal, Helsa, Kaufungen, Lohfelden, Nieste, Niestetal, Schauenburg, Söhrewald, and Vellmar municipalities); Waldeck-Frankenberg district (excluding Allendorf (Eder), Battenberg (Eder), Bromskirchen, Burgwald, Frankenau, Frankenberg (Eder), Gemünden (Wohra), Haina (Kloster), Hatzfeld (Eder), Rosenthal, and Vöhl municipalities)
1983	124	Waldeck	Landkreis Kassel district (excluding Ahnatal, Baunatal, Espenau, Fuldabrück, Fuldatal, Helsa, Kaufungen, Lohfelden, Nieste, Niestetal, Schauenburg, Söhrewald, and Vellmar municipalities); Waldeck-Frankenberg district (excluding Allendorf (Eder), Battenberg (Eder), Bromskirchen, Burgwald, Frankenau, Frankenberg (Eder), Gemünden (Wohra), Haina (Kloster), Hatzfeld (Eder), Rosenthal, and Vöhl municipalities)
1987	124	Waldeck	Landkreis Kassel district (excluding Ahnatal, Baunatal, Espenau, Fuldabrück, Fuldatal, Helsa, Kaufungen, Lohfelden, Nieste, Niestetal, Schauenburg, Söhrewald, and Vellmar municipalities); Waldeck-Frankenberg district (excluding Allendorf (Eder), Battenberg (Eder), Bromskirchen, Burgwald, Frankenau, Frankenberg (Eder), Gemünden (Wohra), Haina (Kloster), Hatzfeld (Eder), Rosenthal, and Vöhl municipalities)
1990	124	Waldeck	Landkreis Kassel district (excluding Ahnatal, Baunatal, Espenau, Fuldabrück, Fuldatal, Helsa, Kaufungen, Lohfelden, Nieste, Niestetal, Schauenburg, Söhrewald, and Vellmar municipalities); Waldeck-Frankenberg district (excluding Allendorf (Eder), Battenberg (Eder), Bromskirchen, Burgwald, Frankenau, Frankenberg (Eder), Gemünden (Wohra), Haina (Kloster), Hatzfeld (Eder), Rosenthal, and Vöhl municipalities)
1994	124	Waldeck	Landkreis Kassel district (excluding Ahnatal, Baunatal, Espenau, Fuldabrück, Fuldatal, Helsa, Kaufungen, Lohfelden, Nieste, Niestetal, Schauenburg, Söhrewald, and Vellmar municipalities); Waldeck-Frankenberg district (excluding Allendorf (Eder), Battenberg (Eder), Bromskirchen, Burgwald, Frankenau, Frankenberg (Eder), Gemünden (Wohra), Haina (Kloster), Hatzfeld (Eder), Rosenthal, and Vöhl municipalities)
1998	124	Waldeck	Landkreis Kassel district (excluding Ahnatal, Baunatal, Espenau, Fuldabrück, Fuldatal, Helsa, Kaufungen, Lohfelden, Nieste, Niestetal, Schauenburg, Söhrewald, and Vellmar municipalities); Waldeck-Frankenberg district (excluding Allendorf (Eder), Battenberg (Eder), Bromskirchen, Burgwald, Frankenau, Frankenberg (Eder), Gemünden (Wohra), Haina (Kloster), Hatzfeld (Eder), Rosenthal, and Vöhl municipalities)
2002	169	Waldeck	Landkreis Kassel district (excluding Ahnatal, Espenau, Fuldabrück, Fuldatal, Helsa, Kaufungen, Lohfelden, Nieste, Niestetal, Söhrewald, and Vellmar municipalities); Waldeck-Frankenberg district (excluding Allendorf (Eder), Battenberg (Eder), Bromskirchen, Burgwald, Frankenau, Frankenberg (Eder), Gemünden (Wohra), Haina (Kloster), Hatzfeld (Eder), Rosenthal, and Vöhl municipalities)
2005	169	Waldeck	Landkreis Kassel district (excluding Ahnatal, Espenau, Fuldabrück, Fuldatal, Helsa, Kaufungen, Lohfelden, Nieste, Niestetal, Söhrewald, and Vellmar municipalities); Waldeck-Frankenberg district (excluding Allendorf (Eder), Battenberg (Eder), Bromskirchen, Burgwald, Frankenau, Frankenberg (Eder), Gemünden (Wohra), Haina (Kloster), Hatzfeld (Eder), Rosenthal, and Vöhl municipalities)
2009	168	Waldeck	Landkreis Kassel district (excluding Ahnatal, Espenau, Fuldabrück, Fuldatal, Helsa, Kaufungen, Lohfelden, Nieste, Niestetal, Söhrewald, and Vellmar municipalities); Waldeck-Frankenberg district (excluding Allendorf (Eder), Battenberg (Eder), Bromskirchen, Burgwald, Frankenau, Frankenberg (Eder), Gemünden (Wohra), Haina (Kloster), Hatzfeld (Eder), Rosenthal, and Vöhl municipalities)
2013	167	Waldeck	Landkreis Kassel district (excluding Ahnatal, Espenau, Fuldabrück, Fuldatal, Helsa, Kaufungen, Lohfelden, Nieste, Niestetal, Söhrewald, and Vellmar municipalities); Waldeck-Frankenberg district (excluding Allendorf (Eder), Battenberg (Eder), Bromskirchen, Burgwald, Frankenau, Frankenberg (Eder), Gemünden (Wohra), Haina (Kloster), Hatzfeld (Eder), Rosenthal, and Vöhl municipalities)
2017	167	Waldeck	Landkreis Kassel district (excluding Ahnatal, Espenau, Fuldabrück, Fuldatal, Helsa, Kaufungen, Lohfelden, Nieste, Niestetal, Söhrewald, and Vellmar municipalities); Waldeck-Frankenberg district (excluding Allendorf (Eder), Battenberg (Eder), Bromskirchen, Burgwald, Frankenau, Frankenberg (Eder), Gemünden (Wohra), Haina (Kloster), Hatzfeld (Eder), Rosenthal, and Vöhl municipalities)
2021	167	Waldeck	Landkreis Kassel district (excluding Ahnatal, Espenau, Fuldabrück, Fuldatal, Helsa, Kaufungen, Lohfelden, Nieste, Niestetal, Söhrewald, and Vellmar municipalities); Waldeck-Frankenberg district (excluding Allendorf (Eder), Battenberg (Eder), Bromskirchen, Burgwald, Frankenau, Frankenberg (Eder), Gemünden (Wohra), Haina (Kloster), Hatzfeld (Eder), Rosenthal, and Vöhl municipalities)
2025	166	Waldeck	Landkreis Kassel district (excluding Ahnatal, Espenau, Fuldabrück, Fuldatal, Helsa, Kaufungen, Lohfelden, Nieste, Niestetal, Söhrewald, and Vellmar municipalities); Waldeck-Frankenberg district (excluding Allendorf (Eder), Battenberg (Eder), Bromskirchen, Burgwald, Frankenau, Frankenberg (Eder), Gemünden (Wohra), Haina (Kloster), Hatzfeld (Eder), Rosenthal, and Vöhl municipalities)

== Members ==
The constituency has been held by the Social Democratic Party (SPD) during all but three Bundestag terms since 1949. It was first represented by Karl Rüdiger of the Free Democratic Party (FDP) from 1949 until his death in 1951. Hans Merten of the SPD won the subsequent by-election, but was defeated at the 1953 federal election by FDP candidate Heinrich Fassbender. Karl Bechert of the SPD was elected in 1957 and served until 1972. He was succeeded by Rudi Walther, who served until 1994. Alfred Hartenbach was then representative until 2009. Ullrich Meßmer served one term from 2009 to 2013, when Thomas Viesehon of the Christian Democratic Union (CDU) won the constituency. Esther Dilcher regained it for the SPD in 2017 and was re-elected in 2021.

Election	Member	Party	%
1949	Karl Rüdiger	FDP	35.2
1951	Hans Merten	SPD	47.2
1953	Heinrich Fassbender	FDP	52.5
1957	Karl Bechert	SPD	35.6
1961	Karl Bechert	SPD	42.4
1965	Karl Bechert	SPD	46.7
1969	Karl Bechert	SPD	50.1
1972	Rudi Walther	SPD	53.6
1976	Rudi Walther	SPD	49.7
1980	Rudi Walther	SPD	52.1
1983	Rudi Walther	SPD	48.6
1987	Rudi Walther	SPD	49.5
1990	Rudi Walther	SPD	48.6
1994	Alfred Hartenbach	SPD	47.4
1998	Alfred Hartenbach	SPD	53.0
2002	Alfred Hartenbach	SPD	52.1
2005	Alfred Hartenbach	SPD	50.2
2009	Ullrich Meßmer	SPD	37.8
2013	Thomas Viesehon	CDU	41.5
2017	Esther Dilcher	SPD	35.1
2021	Esther Dilcher	SPD	38.0
2025	Jan-Wilhelm Pohlmann	CDU	31.1

== Election results ==
=== 2025 election ===
Federal election (2025): Waldeck
Notes:	Blue background denotes the winner of the electorate vote. Pink background denotes a candidate elected from their party list. Yellow background denotes an electorate win by a list member, or other incumbent. A ✓ or ✗ denotes status of any incumbent, win or lose respectively.						
Party	Candidate	Votes	%	±%	Party votes	%	±%
CDU	Jan-Wilhelm Pohlmann	46,166	31.1	▲4.8	42,778	28.8	▲6.4
SPD	✗ Esther Dilcher	41,883	28.2	▼9.7	33,994	22.9	▼13.2
AfD	Jan Nolte	31,701	21.4	▲12.1	31,359	21.1	▲11.6
Greens	Ilka Deutschendorf	10,559	7.1	▼2.9	12,718	8.6	▼2.3
Left	Stefan Giebel	8,462	5.7	▲2.6	9,115	6.1	▲2.9
BSW					6,502	4.4	New
FDP	Jochen Rube	4,863	3.3	▼5.6	5,921	4.0	▼7.3
FW	Michael Maiweg	4,807	3.2	▲0.5	2,496	1.7	▼0.4
Tierschutzpartei					2,152	1.4	0.0
PARTEI					658	0.4	▼0.3
Volt					623	0.4	▲0.3
BD					237	0.2	New
Humanists					119	0.1	0.0
MLPD					38	<0.1	0.0
Informal votes		1,662			1,393		
Total valid votes		148,441			148,710		
Turnout		150,103	83.2	▲8.1			
CDU gain from SPD	Majority	4,282	2.9	N/A			

=== 2021 election ===
Federal election (2021): Waldeck
Notes:	Blue background denotes the winner of the electorate vote. Pink background denotes a candidate elected from their party list. Yellow background denotes an electorate win by a list member, or other incumbent. A ✓ or ✗ denotes status of any incumbent, win or lose respectively.						
Party	Candidate	Votes	%	±%	Party votes	%	±%
SPD	✓ Esther Dilcher	51,613	38.0	▲2.9	49,064	36.1	▲5.2
CDU	Armin Schwarz	35,734	26.3	▼7.3	30,392	22.3	▼7.7
Greens	Peter Koswig	13,581	10.0	▲4.3	14,775	10.9	▲4.0
AfD	Jan Nolte	12,536	9.2	▼1.8	12,899	9.5	▼2.2
FDP	Jochem Rube	12,062	8.9	▲1.8	15,288	11.2	▲1.3
Left	Regina Preysing	4,208	3.1	▼3.0	4,441	3.3	▼3.8
FW	Kira Hauser	3,763	2.8	▲1.4	2,791	2.1	▲1.2
Tierschutzpartei					1,946	1.4	▲0.5
dieBasis	Daniele Saracino	1,626	1.2		1,528	1.1	
PARTEI					964	0.7	▲0.1
Independent	Gerd Erwin Müller	716	0.5				
Pirates					452	0.3	0.0
Team Todenhöfer					374	0.3	
Volt					223	0.2	
Gesundheitsforschung					218	0.2	
NPD					159	0.1	▼0.2
Independent	Barbara Meyer	151	0.1				
Bündnis C					114	0.1	
ÖDP					106	0.1	0.0
Humanists					87	0.1	
V-Partei3					83	0.1	0.0
Bündnis 21					41	0.0	
MLPD					40	0.0	0.0
LKR					31	0.0	
DKP					27	0.0	0.0
Informal votes		2,140			2,087		
Total valid votes		135,990			136,043		
Turnout		138,130	75.0	▼1.4			
SPD hold	Majority	15,879	11.7	▲10.2			

=== 2017 election ===
Federal election (2017): Waldeck
Notes:	Blue background denotes the winner of the electorate vote. Pink background denotes a candidate elected from their party list. Yellow background denotes an electorate win by a list member, or other incumbent. A ✓ or ✗ denotes status of any incumbent, win or lose respectively.						
Party	Candidate	Votes	%	±%	Party votes	%	±%
SPD	Esther Dilcher	49,341	35.1	▼6.2	43,446	30.9	▼5.2
CDU	✗ Thomas Viesehon	47,269	33.6	▼7.9	42,232	30.0	▼6.5
AfD	Jan Ralf Nolte	15,438	11.0		16,411	11.7	▲6.6
FDP	Jochen Rube	9,930	7.1	▲4.4	13,918	9.9	▲5.1
Left	Regina Preysing	8,600	6.1	▲0.7	9,891	7.0	▲1.6
Greens	Jürgen Frömmrich	8,062	5.7	▼0.6	9,660	6.9	▼1.2
Tierschutzpartei					1,329	0.9	
FW	Vera Gleuel	1,910	1.4		1,268	0.9	▲0.1
PARTEI					900	0.6	▲0.2
Pirates					497	0.4	▼1.3
NPD					442	0.3	▼0.5
BGE					203	0.1	
DM					175	0.1	
V-Partei³					155	0.1	
ÖDP					127	0.1	
Independent	Karin Puppel	88	0.1				
MLPD					45	0.0	0.0
BüSo					17	0.0	0.0
DKP					17	0.0	
Informal votes		2,214			2,119		
Total valid votes		140,638			140,733		
Turnout		142,852	76.5	▲3.4			
SPD gain from CDU	Majority	2,072	1.5				

=== 2013 election ===
Federal election (2013): Waldeck
Notes:	Blue background denotes the winner of the electorate vote. Pink background denotes a candidate elected from their party list. Yellow background denotes an electorate win by a list member, or other incumbent. A ✓ or ✗ denotes status of any incumbent, win or lose respectively.						
Party	Candidate	Votes	%	±%	Party votes	%	±%
CDU	Thomas Viesehon	55,444	41.5	▲6.1	49,063	36.5	▲6.6
SPD	✗ Ullrich Meßmer	55,217	41.3	▲3.5	48,420	36.0	▲3.0
Greens	Caroline Chantal Tönges	8,486	6.3	▼1.8	10,872	8.1	▼1.7
Left	Dieter Hille	7,253	5.4	▼2.2	7,356	5.5	▼3.0
AfD					6,774	5.0	
FDP	Björn Sänger	3,579	2.7	▼6.9	6,452	4.8	▼9.9
Pirates	Arno Schröder	3,177	2.4		2,242	1.7	▲0.1
NPD					1,159	0.9	
FW					1,013	0.8	
Independent	Werner Bracht	545	0.4				
PARTEI					525	0.4	
REP					237	0.2	▼0.2
PRO					152	0.1	
SGP					71	0.1	
BüSo					47	0.0	▼0.1
MLPD					33	0.0	0.0
Informal votes		4,931			4,216		
Total valid votes		133,701			134,416		
Turnout		138,632	73.1	▼0.1			
CDU gain from SPD	Majority	227	0.2				

=== 2009 election ===
Federal election (2009): Waldeck
Notes:	Blue background denotes the winner of the electorate vote. Pink background denotes a candidate elected from their party list. Yellow background denotes an electorate win by a list member, or other incumbent. A ✓ or ✗ denotes status of any incumbent, win or lose respectively.						
Party	Candidate	Votes	%	±%	Party votes	%	±%
SPD	Ullrich Meßmer	51,737	37.8	▼12.5	45,343	33.0	▼11.1
CDU	Thomas Viesehon	48,414	35.3	▲0.9	41,109	29.9	▼0.3
FDP	Björn Sänger	13,180	9.6	▲4.9	20,210	14.7	▲5.0
Greens	Anke Pavlicek	11,209	8.2	▲3.7	13,498	9.8	▲2.3
Left	Klaus Albrecht	10,400	7.6	▲2.9	11,657	8.5	▲3.1
Pirates					2,175	1.6	
NPD	David Giesler	1,756	1.3	▼0.1	1,393	1.0	▼0.1
Tierschutzpartei					1,121	0.8	▲0.2
REP					504	0.4	▼0.2
Independent	Jürgen Lenz	311	0.2				
BüSo					122	0.1	0.0
DVU					115	0.1	
MLPD					48	0.0	0.0
Informal votes		3,801			3,513		
Total valid votes		137,007			137,295		
Turnout		140,808	73.2	▼6.3			
SPD hold	Majority	3,323	2.5	▼13.3			

=== 2005 election ===
Federal election (2005):Waldeck
Notes:	Blue background denotes the winner of the electorate vote. Pink background denotes a candidate elected from their party list. Yellow background denotes an electorate win by a list member, or other incumbent. A ✓ or ✗ denotes status of any incumbent, win or lose respectively.						
Party	Candidate	Votes	%	±%	Party votes	%	±%
SPD	✓ Alfred Hartenbach	75,533	50.2	▼1.9	66,483	44.1	▼4.2
CDU	Christoph Butterweck	51,807	34.4	▼0.8	45,491	30.2	▼3.0
FDP	Björn Sänger	7,112	4.7	▼1.0	14,714	9.8	▲2.2
Left	Klaus Albrecht	7,104	4.7	▲3.5	8,137	5.4	▲4.4
Greens	Nicole Maisch	6,734	4.5	▼1.1	11,268	7.5	0.0
NPD	Marion Figge	2,096	1.4		1,706	1.1	▲0.8
Tierschutzpartei					999	0.7	▲0.2
REP					873	0.6	0.0
GRAUEN					627	0.4	▲0.2
SGP					130	0.1	
BüSo					91	0.1	0.0
MLPD					83	0.1	
Informal votes		4,050			3,834		
Total valid votes		150,386			150,602		
Turnout		154,436	79.5	▼1.2			
SPD hold	Majority	26,726	15.8				
