= Chappy =

Chappy may refer to:

== People ==
- Chappy Hakim (born 1947), Air Chief Marshal of the Indonesian Air Force from 2002 to 2005
- Raymond Chappy Charles (1881–1959), American Major League Baseball player
- George Chappy Lane (died 1901), American Major League Baseball player
- Chappy (drummer) (1905–1973), Hungarian jazz drummer

== Characters ==
- Charles "Chappy" Sinclair, a main character in the film Iron Eagle and its sequels, played by Louis Gossett Jr.
- The title character of Mahōtsukai Chappy or Chappy the Witch, a Japanese anime
- The title character of Chappy—That's All, a British 1924 film

== Other uses ==
- Chappaquiddick Island, Massachusetts, United States, known colloquially as "Chappy"
- Chaplygin (crater), lunar crater nicknamed "Chappy"
- Yamaha Chappy, a moped or scooter
- Chappy, a UK-based online gay dating app financed by Whitney Wolfe Herd
- Chappy, a Scottish colloquial name for a door-knocking prank

== See also ==
- Chappie (disambiguation)
- Albert Ferrer (born 1970), Spanish retired footballer nicknamed "Chapi"
