= Jan-Wilhelm Pohlmann =

German politician (born 1986)

Jan-Wilhelm Pohlmann MdB

Member of the Bundestag; for Waldeck
- Incumbent
- Assumed office 25 March 2025
- Preceded by: Esther Dilcher

Member of the Landtag of Hesse; for Waldeck-Frankenberg I
- In office 2 November 2021 – 1 April 2025
- Preceded by: Armin Schwarz
- Succeeded by: Hartwig Jourdan

Personal details
- Born: 31 July 1986 (age 40) Korbach, West Germany
- Party: Christian Democratic Union
- Children: 2
- Education: University of Hagen

Jan-Wilhelm Pohlmann (born 31 July 1986) is a German politician serving as a member of the Bundestag since 2025. Pohlmann previously served as a member of the Landtag of Hesse from 2021 to 2025.
