= Thomas Viesehon =

German politician (born 1979)

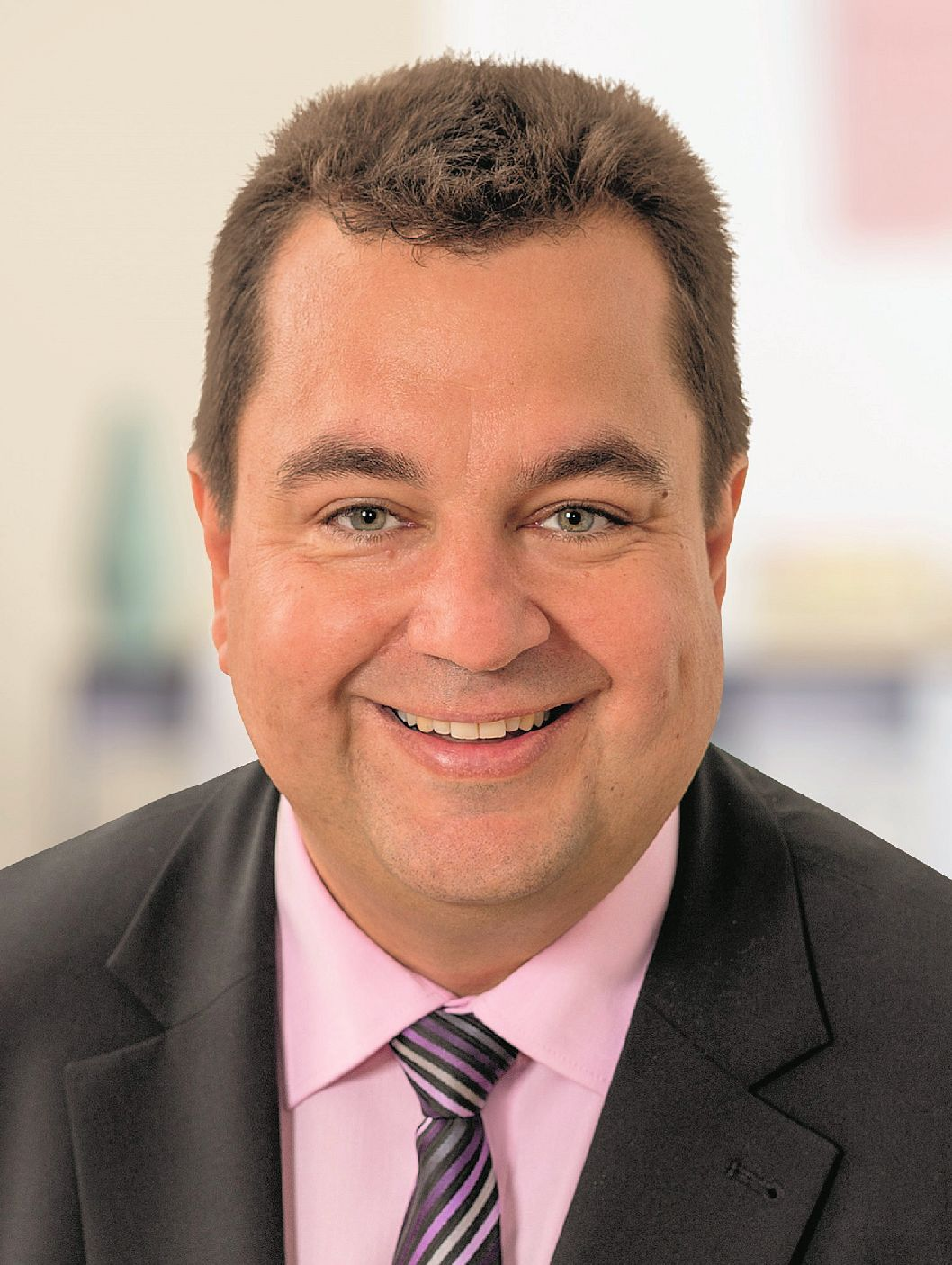
- Viesehon in 2017

Member of the Bundestag
- In office 8 May 2021 – 26 October 2021
- Preceded by: Peter Tauber
- Succeeded by: Bettina Müller
- Constituency: Main-Kinzig – Wetterau II – Schotten
- In office 22 October 2013 – 24 October 2017
- Preceded by: Ullrich Meßmer
- Succeeded by: Esther Dilcher
- Constituency: Waldeck

Personal details
- Born: 6 August 1973 (age 53) Volkmarsen, West Germany
- Party: Christian Democratic Union

Thomas Viesehon (born 16 June 1979) is a German politician of the Christian Democratic Union (CDU) who has served as a member of the Bundestag from the state of Hesse from 2013 till 2017 and again since 2021.

== Political career ==
Viesehon became a member of the Bundestag in 2021 when he replaced Peter Tauber who had resigned.
