= Heinrich Fassbender =

German politician (1899–1971)

Member of the Landtag of Hesse
- In office 1 December 1966 – 1 December 1970
- Constituency: State list
- In office 1 December 1946 – 12 February 1948
- Preceded by: Constituency established
- Succeeded by: Erich Germershausen
- Constituency: Wahlkreis VIII

Member of the Bundestag; from Hesse
- In office 7 September 1949 – 15 October 1957
- Preceded by: Constituency established
- Succeeded by: Karl Bechert
- Constituency: State list (1949–1953); Waldeck (1953–1957)

Personal details
- Born: 24 May 1899 Solingen, Germany
- Died: 22 June 1971 (aged 72) Rotenburg an der Fulda, West Germany
- Party: National Democratic (1964–1969)
- Other political affiliations: DNVP (1919–1931); NSDAP (1931–1932); NDP (1945–1946); LDP/DPD (1946–1948); FDP (1948–1955); DP (1955–1962); DNVP (1962–1964)

Heinrich Fassbender (24 May 1899 – 22 June 1971) was a German politician and former member of the German Bundestag.

== Political career ==
Fassbender was a member of the Hessian State Parliament from 1946 until 12 February 1948, when he resigned because he was elected Hessian member of the Bizone Economic Council (until 1949). In the 1949 Bundestag elections, he was elected to the German Bundestag, of which he was a member until 1957. In 1953 he was elected as a direct candidate in the Waldeck constituency of the Bundestag.

== Literature ==
Herbst, Ludolf; Jahn, Bruno (2002). Vierhaus, Rudolf (ed.). Biographisches Handbuch der Mitglieder des Deutschen Bundestages. 1949–2002 [Biographical Handbook of the Members of the German Bundestag. 1949–2002] (in German). München: De Gruyter - De Gruyter Saur. p. 1715. ISBN 978-3-11-184511-1.
