= They Walk in the Night =

First edition (publ. Howard Timmins)

They Walk in the Night is a collection of South African ghost stories or spiritual encounters by Eric Rosenthal published in 1949.
