= Marie-Antoinette de Geuser =

French nun (1889–1918)

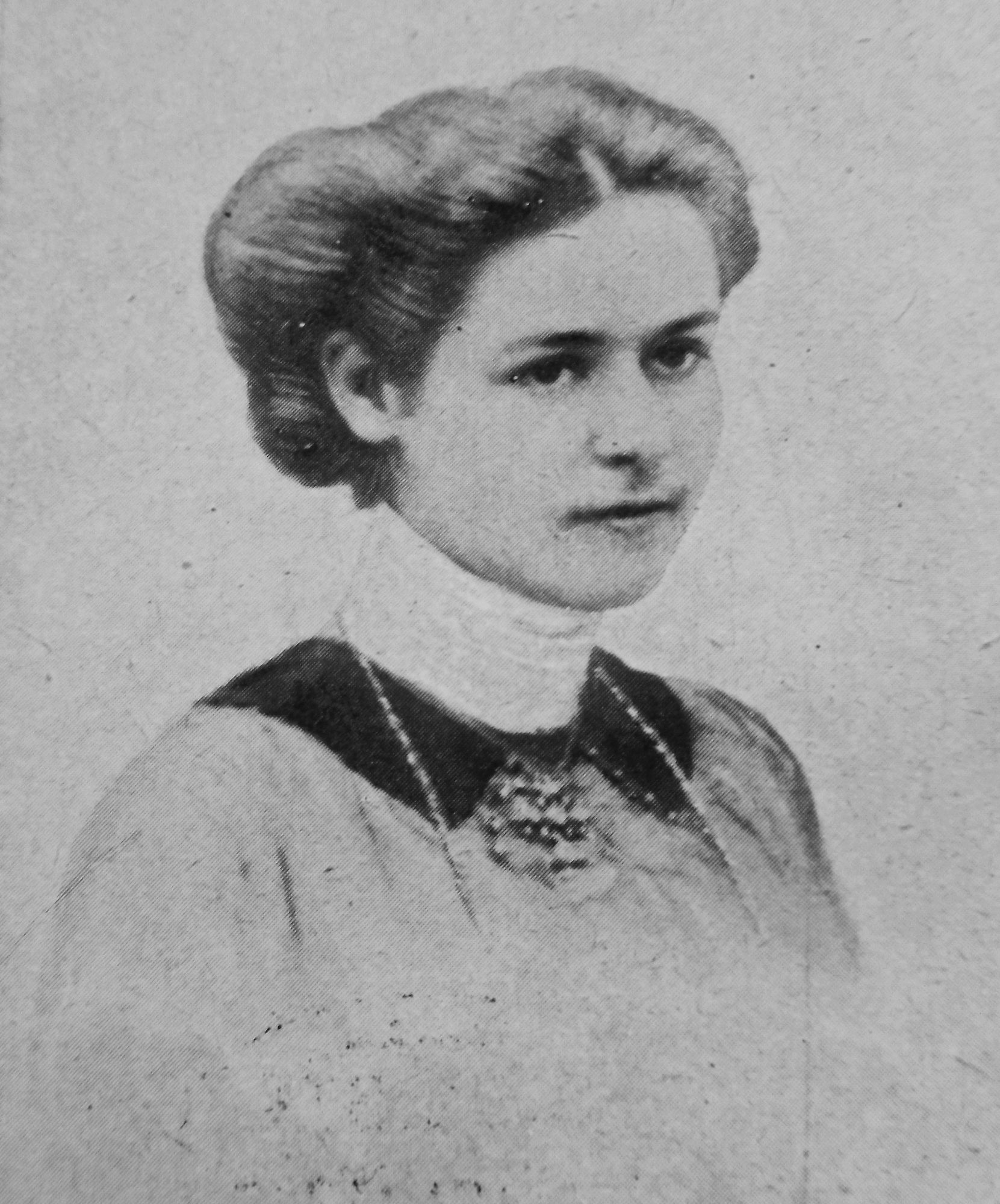
Marie-Antoinette de Geuser

Marie-Antoinette de Geuser was a French nun (known as "Consummata"; 20 April 1889, in Le Havre – 22 June 1918, in Le Havre). Being in close contact with the Carmelites, her state of health and the events of World War I did not allow her to take her vows.

She left notes and correspondence that are remarkable testimonies of Carmelite spirituality, in the wake of Thérèse of Lisieux and Elizabeth of the Trinity.

== Biography ==
Marie-Antoinette de Geuser was the daughter of René de Geuser and his wife, née Loyzeaux Grandmaison. She was the eldest of their twelve children. (Marie-Antoinette, Henri, Georges (died in the War of 1914–1918), Louis, Michel, Hubert (died in the war of 1914–1918), Jean, François, René, Marie-Magdeleine, Alfred and Theresa)

There were several religious vocations in this family. Of two paternal uncles, one was in the Carthusian order and the other became a Canon. Two maternal uncles were Jesuits and an aunt became a Carmelite. Four of her brothers also became religious.

Marie Antoinette had fragile health as a child. She nearly died in 1906 as a result of appendicitis.

It was during the summer of 1906 that she discerned her vocation: ' "on 21 September something happened that I cannot tell you exactly." [...] This moment I no longer had any doubt: the light of my childhood was now something truly divine... I gave myself wholly to God. "" (letter of 15 June 1910 to the prior of the Carmel of Pontoise). On the 31 October following, she decided to now live the contemplative life.

Marie-Antoinette de Geuser could not enter the Carmelite convent. She corresponded with Marie-Thérèse of the Sacred Heart, at the Carmel of Pontoise from 1910 to 1917. She received the name of "Marie of the Trinity" in religion.

In 1914, and again in 1915, she passed through serious health problems which forced her to return to her parents' home where she continued the life of recluse.

More and more frequently she signed her letters in the name of "Consummata" (the one Consumed by Love).

She died on 22 June 1918 without having taken final religious vows.

== Posthumous recognition ==
Father Raoul Plus, a Jesuit, published in 1921 under the name of “Consummata” a collection of texts and extracts of her diaries and correspondence. The book has had numerous reissues.

In 1928, Father Plus revealed in a new book the actual name and a biography of Marie-Antoinette de Geuser.

Two years later, in 1930, there appeared a third book: " Letters from 'Consummata" to a Carmelite."( les Lettres de ‘‘Consummata’’ à une carmélite).

Together these three books gave Marie-Antoinette de Geuser great fame. Translations appeared in German, Spanish, Dutch, Italian, Portuguese, etc.

Her texts were read and appreciated by Edith Stein who carried them with her when she had to flee from Germany because of the Nazis, on December 31, 1938.

Hans Urs von Balthasar cites her many times under the name of Consummata in the diaries which were published in their final form in 1989 under the title 'Das Weizenkorn".

== Bibliography ==
=== Text of Marie-Antoinette Geuser ===
- Jusqu'aux sommets de l'union divine : "Consummata", lettres et notes spirituelles, introduction by Father Raoul Plus, Toulouse, Apostolate of Prayer, 1921, 284 pp.; new edition 1929 (254 pp.), again in 1946 (212 pp.).
- Marie de la Trinité : lettres de "Consummata" à une carmélite, the Carmel of Avignon, 1931, 286 pp.
- Lettres au Père Anatole de Grandmaison, son directeur, presentation by Father. Louis de Geuser, Paris, Beauchesne, 1977, 240 pp.
- Lettres à ses frères, introduction of Father André Ravier in collaboration with Fathers Louis de Geuser and Paul Duclos, Paris, Editions du Cerf, 1982, 232 pp.
- Notes spirituelles, preface of Didier-Marie Golay, Paris-Orbey, Éditions Arfuyen, 2011, 174 pp.

=== Books and articles on Marie-Antoinette de Geuser ===
- Raoul Plus, Marie-Antoinette de Geuser, vie de « Consummata », Toulouse, Apostolate of Prayer, 1928, 316 pp.; new edition. 1933.
- "Marie-Antoine de GEUSER" – Press Article in the newspaper La Croix - 1930/05/04 (Number 14472)-1930/05/05. La Croix
- Marie-Térèse Guignet, Une expérience mystique : Marie-Antoinette de Geuser (main thesis for the doctorate of letters presented to the Faculty of Letters of the University of Grenoble), Paris, Desclée De Brouwer, 1939, 2 vol., 175 pages and 95 pp.; the first vol. was reissued by the same Publisher, in 1941, under the same title, in a vol. of 296 pp.
- "Une expérience mystique - Marie-Antoine de GEUSER" – Press Article in the newspaper La Croix - PAGE 3 - 1942/08/01 (Number 18258)-1942/08/02. La Croix
- Marie-Paule Vachez and Élisabeth Rimaud, Un itinéraire mystique : de Marie-Antoinette de Geuser à Consummata, Genève, Claude Martingay, 1974, 408 pp. (coll. Ad Solem).
- Élisabeth Rimaud, "De Marie-Antoinette de Geuser à Consummata", in Revue du Rosaire (Saint-Maximin-la-Sainte-Baume), 55th year, no 7, July 1975, pp. 199–217.
- "de Marie-Antoinette de Geuser à Consummata" - Mensuelle - July 1975 – 55th year – no 7 - Revue du Rosaire.
