= Toshiko Yuasa =

Japanese physicist (Japanese Marie Curie) (1909-1980)

- 湯浅年子
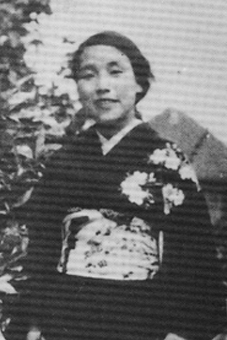
- Toshiko Yuasa at the Joliot-Curies' home outside of Paris in 1941
- Born: 11 December 1909; Taitō, Tokyo, Japan
- Died: 2 February 1980 (aged 70); Rouen, France
- Education: Tokyo Women's Higher Normal School; Tokyo Bunrika University
- Awards: Medal with Purple Ribbon; Order of the Precious Crown
- Scientific career
- Fields: Nuclear physics
- Workplaces: Tokyo Women's Higher Normal School; Tokyo Bunrika University; Tokyo Woman's Christian University; Centre national de la recherche scientifique
- Thesis: Contribution à l'étude du spectre continu des rayons β− émis par les corps radioactifs artificiels (1943)

Toshiko Yuasa (湯浅年子, Yuasa Toshiko; 11 December 1909 – 2 February 1980) was a Japanese nuclear physicist who worked in the French National Centre for Scientific Research (CNRS). She was the first Japanese female physicist, and was known as the Japanese Marie Curie. She spent most of her career advancing nuclear physics and fostering scientific collaboration between Japan and France.

== Biography ==
=== Early life and education ===
Toshiko Yuasa was born in Taitō Ward, Tokyo, in 1909. Her father was an engineer who worked for the Japanese patent office. Her mother was from a traditional literary family – her mother's grandfather was Tachibana Moribe a leading poet scholar in late Edo Japan. Toshiko was the second-youngest of seven children. Yuasa attended the Division of Science at Tokyo Women's Higher Normal School (now Ochanomizu University) from 1927 until her graduation in 1931. She then enrolled in the Department of Physics at Tokyo Bunrika University (now the University of Tsukuba), making her the first woman in Japan to study physics. She graduated in 1934.

=== Early career ===
Yuasa began teaching at Tokyo Bunrika University as a part-time vice-assistant after graduating in 1934. There, she began her research into molecular spectroscopy. In 1935 she became a lecturer at Tokyo Women's Christian College, where she remained until 1937. The following year, she was hired as an assistant professor at Tokyo Women's Higher Normal School.

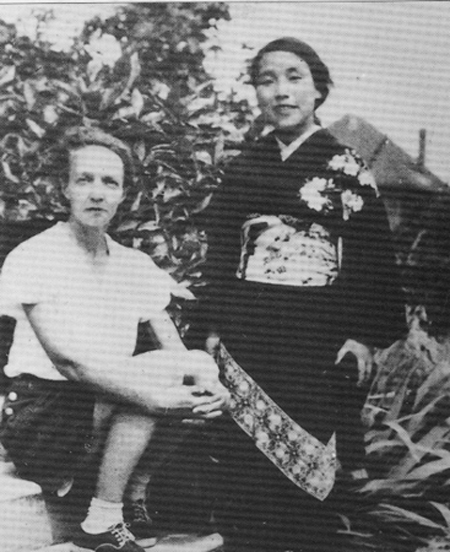
Toshiko Yuasa (right) with Irene Joliot-Curie at the latter's home outside of Paris in 1941

Yuasa was inspired by the discovery of artificial radioactivity by Irène and Frédéric Joliot-Curie at the Radium Institute in Paris. Because of difficult research conditions in Tokyo, Yuasa moved to Paris in 1940, even though the Second World War had just begun in Europe. She worked under Frédéric Joliot-Curie at the Collège de France, where she researched the alpha and beta particles emitted by artificial radioactive nuclei and the energy spectrum of beta particles. With her thesis, titled "Contribution à l'étude du spectre continu des rayons β^{−} émis par les corps radioactifs artificiels" (Continuous beta-ray spectrum generated by artificial radioactivity), she earned a doctorate in science in 1943.

With the Allied armies approaching Paris in August 1944, as a citizen of Japan, a country allied to Germany, Yuasa was instructed by the Japanese government to leave Paris. She continued her research in Christian Gerthsen's laboratory at the University of Berlin and developed her own beta-ray spectrometer. In 1945, she was ordered to return to Japan by the Soviet officials who controlled that sector of Berlin. She travelled to Manchuria on the Siberian Railway with her spectrometer carried on her back, and reached mainland Japan by the end of June 1945. She was able to reunite with her mother before the latter died soon after her return. The dropping of atomic bombs on Hiroshima and Nagasaki in August 1945 led to the surrender of the Japanese state in early September and foreign occupation.

=== Post war career ===
Upon her return to Tokyo, Ysasa returned again to Tokyo Women's Higher Normal School as a professor. Her family's homes had been destroyed by wartime air raids, so she lived in a dormitory at the school. In 1947 she wrote to Frédéric Joliot-Curie about the challenges of surviving "in this completely ruined Japan, where I have neither a home nor parents, and more than anything else, any laboratory." She was unable to continue her previous research, since the United States Occupation Forces prohibited nuclear research in Japan and the Japanese cyclotron at RIKEN was destroyed in November 1945. From 1946 to 1949, she worked at the RIKEN Nishina Center for Accelerator-Based Science and lectured at Kyoto University in 1948–1949.

Yuasa returned to France in May 1949 as a researcher for the Centre national de la recherche scientifique (CNRS) while remaining a professor-on-leave at Ochanomizu University. She had been in correspondence with Frédéric Joliot-Curie for some time to get a scholarship, sponsorships and permissions to travel to and work in France. Her journey to France by ship was affected by a strike and she was stranded for some time in Singapore with minimal money as Japanese nationals were forbidden from taking much currency out of the country.

Yuasa decided to stay in France permanently in 1955, resigning from her post at Ochanomizu. At the CNRS, she began research into beta decay using a Wilson chamber, and published a 1954 article warning of the dangers of hydrogen-bomb testing at Bikini Atoll. She was promoted to maître de recherche (chief researcher) at CNRS in 1957. Her research shifted into nuclear reactions using synchrocyclotrons around 1960, and in 1962 she received a doctorate in science from Kyoto University for her thesis, "Étude du type d’invariant de l’interaction Gamow-Teller en désintégration β^{−} de ^{6}He" (Form of Gamow-Teller invariant interaction on beta decay of ^{6}He).

Yuasa developed stomach cancer and underwent surgery in 1973 and the following year she reached the official age for retirement.

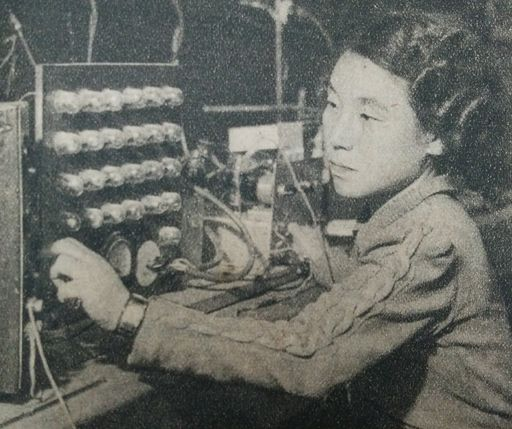
Yuasa Toshiko in 1947

=== Retirement and death ===
Yuasa retired from the CNRS in 1974, but remained an emeritus researcher from 1975. She received a Medal with Purple Ribbon from the Japanese government in 1976 for her efforts to promote cultural exchanges between France and Japan. Her final major undertaking was the development of a Japanese-French research project on few-nucleon systems. The project was officially approved on the day Yuasa died.

She was hospitalised in January 1980 at the Centre Henri-Becquerel in Rouen and died from cancer on 1 February 1980, aged 70.

Following Yuasa’s death, some of her belongings from her apartment in the 5th arrondissement of Paris were sent to Ochanomizu University for sorting and classification under the terms of her will. Scientific and other papers were kept by the university and can be found in the Yuasa archive at the Ochanomizu University. Where possible, personal letters were returned to the senders, whilst her diaries and other private papers were passed on to the Yuasa family. In 2007, letters between Yuasa and the Joliot-Curies were donated to the Bibliothèque Nationale de France by the latter's children and held at the Musée Curie.

== Honours and awards ==
Yuasa was referred to as the "Japanese Marie Curie" and she was posthumously conferred the Order of the Precious Crown of the Third Class in 1980. Ochanomizu University introduced the Toshiko Yuasa Prize in 2002, awarding sponsorship for young women scientists to travel to France for further study.

In 2008, to mark 150 years of Franco-Japanese relations, the French National Institute of Nuclear and Particle Physics (INNP) held a ceremony in Yuasa' memory at the CNRS headquarters. A similar ceremony was held at Ochanomizu Woman's University, and two stamps were issued in Yuasa's honour. In 2023, the Franco-Japanese partnership of the French Centre National de la Recherche Scientifique and the Japanese High Energy Accelerator Research Organization (KEK) opened the Toshiko Yuasa Laboratory in Tsukuba, Ibaraki, Japan, building on their international collaboration since 2006.

In 2026, Yuasa was announced as one of 72 historical women in STEM whose names have been proposed to be added to the 72 men already celebrated on the Eiffel Tower as part of the Hypatia Project. It was initially intended that only French born women should be included, but this was later extended to include women who worked in or moved to France. Yuasa was one of the names put forward by the originator of the idea, Benjamin Rigaud. The plan was announced by the Mayor of Paris, Anne Hidalgo following the recommendations of a committee led by Isabelle Vauglin of Femmes et Sciences and Jean-François Martins, representing the operating company which runs the Eiffel Tower.

== See also ==
- List of women associated with Marie Curie and Irène Joliot-Curie
