= Christian Gerthsen =

German physicist (1894–1956)

Christian Gerthsen (21 November 1894 in Hörup, Alsen, Province of Schleswig-Holstein, German Reich – 8 December 1956 in Karlsruhe, West Germany) was a German physicist who made contributions to atomic and nuclear physics, as well as writing numerous textbooks.

== Education ==
Gerthsen studied at the Ruprecht Karl University of Heidelberg and the Ludwig-Maximilians-Universität München from 1913 to 1914. Around 1914 to 1918, he served in the military. Around 1919 to 1920, he attended the Georg August University of Göttingen. In 1920, he went to Kiel University. With Walther Kreisel as his advisor, he was awarded his doctorate in 1929. He stayed as Kossel’s assistant until 1930, and then went to the University of Tübingen as a Privatdozent.

== Career ==
In 1932, Gerthsen was appointed ordinarius professor of experimental physics and director of the physics institute at the University of Giessen. In 1939, he went to the First Physics Institute at the Humboldt University of Berlin, where he was director. Towards the end of World War II, Japanese French nuclear physicist Toshiko Yuasa worked in his lab.

From 1948, he worked at the University of Karlsruhe (TH), where he remained for the rest of his career.

Gerthsen co-authored a number of textbooks with Karl Bechert. One of Gerthsen’s textbooks on physics, first published in 1948, has since his death seen continuous development and is, as of 2020, in its 25th updated edition, more than 50 years after his death.

== Selected Literature ==
- C. Gerthsen (Physikalisches Institut der Universität, Kiel) Über die Möglichkeit der Erregung von Röntgenstrahlen durch den Stoß von α- und Kanalstrahlen, Zeitschrift für Physik Volume 36, Number 7, Pages 540-547 (1926). Received 14 February 1926.
- C. Gerthsen Ein Maltekationsverfahren von Kanalstrahlenenergien und seine Anwendung auf Atomzertrümmerung, Naturwissenschaften Volume 20, Number 40, Pages 743-744 (1932)
- C. Gertshen (I. Physikalisches Institut der Universität, Berlin) and E. Grimm (I. Physikalisches Institut der Universität, Berlin) Der Ionisierungsaufwand von radioaktiven Rückstoßatomen, Zeitschrift für Physik Volume 120, Numbers 7-10, Pages 476-485 (1943). Received 30 September 1942.

== Books ==
- Karl Bechert and Christian Gerthsen Atomphysik Bd. I Allgemeine Grundlagen (De Gruyter, 1944, 1955, 1959)
- Karl Bechert and Christian Gerthsen Atomphysik Bd. II Allgemeine Grundlagen (De Gruyter, 1944, 1959, 1963)
- Christian Gerthsen Physik (Volk u. Wissen, 1948, 1951) (Springer, 1956, 1958)
- Christian Gerthsen und Max Pollermann Einführung in das physikalische Praktikum zum Studium der Physik als Nebenfach (Springer, 1953)
- Christian Gerthsen and Max Pollermann Einführung in das physikalische Praktikum (Springer, 1960, 1964, 1967)
- Christian Gerthsen und M. Pollermann Einführung in das Physikalische Praktikum. Für Mediziner und das Anfängerpraktikum (Springer-Verlag, 1982)
- Christian Gerthsen und Hans Otto Kneser Physik (Springer, 1960, 1963, 1964, 1966, 1969)
- Karl Bechert and Christian Gerthsen Atomphysik Bd. III, Theorie des Atombaus (De Gruyter, 1954, 1963)
- Karl Bechert, Christian Gerthsen, and Arnold Flammersfeld Atomphysik. Bd. IV. Theorie des Atombaus 2. Teil (De Gruyter, 1954, 1963, 1984)
- Christian Gerthsen, Hans O. Kneser, and Helmut Vogel Physik: Ein Lehrbuch Zum Gebrauch Neben Vorlesungen (Springer-Verlag, 17th edition, 1993)
- Christian Gerthsen und Helmut Vogel Gerthsen Physik (Springer-Verlag, 1995, 1997, 2001)
- Christian Gerthsen and Dieter Meschede Gerthsen Physik. Mit 1074 Aufgaben und vollständigen Lösungen auf CD-ROM (Springer, 2003, 2005)
- Christian Gerthsen, author and Dieter Meschede, editor Gerthsen Physik (Springer; 23 edition, 2007) This textbook is cited as having 1157 pages.
