= Alfred Hartenbach =

Member of the Bundestag; for Waldeck
- In office 10 November 1994 – 27 October 2009
- Preceded by: Rudi Walther
- Succeeded by: Ullrich Meßmer

Personal details
- Born: 5 March 1943 Schwalmstadt, Germany
- Died: 25 June 2016 (aged 73)
- Party: Social Democratic
- Children: 2
- Education: Marburg University

Alfred Hartenbach (5 March 1943 – 25 June 2016) was a German politician (SPD). From 2002 to 2009 he was Parliamentary State Secretary at the Federal Ministry of Justice.

== Education ==
After graduating from high school in 1963, Hartenbach did his military service as a reserve officer candidate until 1965 and studied Protestant theology until 1966, then law in Marburg. In 1971, he passed the first and in 1973, the second state law examination.

== Career ==
From 1974, he worked as a public prosecutor specializing in organized and white-collar crime in Hesse. In January 1986 he became a judge and in October 1986, director of the district court in Hofgeismar. From 1991 to 1993, he was also director of the district court in Nordhausen / Thuringia.

He was a member of the SPD beginning in 1968, a member of the Hessen-Nord district committee beginning in 1990, and a member of the party council beginning in 1994. From 1977 to 1994, he was a city councilor in his hometown of Immenhausen in the Kassel district. From 1994 to 2009, he was a member of the German Bundestag. From 1998 to 2002, he was chairman of the legal policy working group and a member of the board of the SPD parliamentary group. He was drafted into the Bundestag as a directly elected member of the Waldeck constituency. In the federal elections in 2005, he achieved 50.2% of the first votes. In the 2009 federal election, Hartenbach no longer ran for a mandate. After the 2002 federal election, Hartenbach was appointed Parliamentary State Secretary to the Federal Minister of Justice on October 23, 2002, in the federal government led by Chancellor Gerhard Schröder (Schröder II cabinet). In this office, he is also a member of the government led by Chancellor Angela Merkel since November 22, 2005 (Merkel Cabinet I). After the federal elections in 2009 and the subsequent change of government, Hartenbach left office.

== Personal life ==
Hartenbach was married and had two children.
