= David Rosenthal =

David Rosenthal may refer to:

- David Rosenthal (musician) (born 1961), American keyboardist, music producer, and songwriter
- David H. Rosenthal (1945–1992), American author, poet, editor and translator
- David M. Rosenthal (philosopher) (fl. 1970s to present), philosopher at the City University of New York
- David M. Rosenthal (director) (born 1969), American filmmaker, writer and director
- David S. Rosenthal (fl. 1990s to present), American television producer
- David S. H. Rosenthal (born 1948), computer scientist

== See also ==
- David Rosenthall, Archdeacon of Singapore 1945-1947
