= Karl Bechert =

German physicist (1901–1981)

Member of the Bundestag; for Waldeck
- In office 15 October 1957 – 13 December 1972
- Preceded by: Heinrich Fassbender
- Succeeded by: Rudi Walther

Personal details
- Born: Karl Richard Bechert; 23 August 1901 Nuremberg, Germany
- Died: 1 April 1981 (aged 79) Weilmünster, West Germany
- Party: Social Democratic
- Children: 2
- Education: LMU Munich

Karl Richard Bechert (23 August 1901 – 1 April 1981) was a German theoretical physicist and political leader. As a scientist, he made contributions in atomic physics.

== Scientific career ==
From 1920 to 1925, Bechert studied physics and mathematics at the Ludwig-Maximilians-Universität München, at the Institute of Theoretical Physics. He received his doctor of philosophy under Arnold Sommerfeld, in 1925. Under a fellowship of the Rockefeller Foundation, from 1925 to 1926, he accomplished postdoctoral studies and research at the Physics Institute of the Complutense University of Madrid. From 1926 to 1933, he was an assistant to Sommerfeld, completing his Habilitation in 1930 and becoming a Privatdozent.

While working for his Ph.D., Bechert helped Sommerfeld extend the Bohr model of the atom and determine the atomic cobalt and vanadium energy terms from their respective spectra. He worked in collaboration with Miguel A. Catalán and Ludwig August Sommer. His thesis was on the structure of atomic nickel spectra.

In 1933, he was called as an ordinarius professor and director of the Institute for Theoretical Physics at the University of Giessen. From 1945 to 1946, he was rector at the university. He remained at Giessen until 1946, whereupon he was called as ordinarius professor and director of the Institute for Theoretical Physics at the University of Mainz, where he remained until his retirement in 1969. He was also a member of the State Commission for School Questions on Lecture Courses at Mainz.

From 1942 to 1948, Bechert was chairman of the Hesse District Association of the Deutsche Physikalische Gesellschaft. In 1963, he was elected as a foreign member of the Norwegian Academy of Sciences.

Bechert co-authored a number of books with Christian Gerthsen.

== Community and Politics ==
Bechert was raised in the Lutheran Church. He had refused to join the Nazi Party, and in promoting his Jewish colleagues at the Institute for Theoretical Physics of the University of Mainz, he angered the Party. He also protected local citizens from the Nazis by hiding them in the surrounding forest.

In 1945, the Allied Military Government for Occupied Territories appointed Bechert mayor of Donsbach, Westerwald and the Oberschulrat in Dillingen, where, on behalf of the Allied Military Government, he built a secondary school/high school.

While at the University of Mainz, he was a member of the Senate Commission for Atomic Questions. Since the 1950s, he was a member of the Kuratorium of the Deutsche Friedensgesellschaft (DFG) - the German Peace Society. In 1951, Bechert joined Victor Paschkis in founding the Society for Social Responsibility in Science. In 1955, he became a member the Church and Politics working group of the Evangelist Church in Hesse-Nassau. The next year, he joined the Social Democratic Party of Germany. From 1957 to 1972, he was an SPD delegate in the German Bundestag. From 1962 to 1965, he was also chairman of the Committee for Atomic Energy and Water Management. In the beginning of his political career, he fought against nuclear armament. Later he opposed also the so-called "peaceful use of nuclear energy" ("friedliche Nutzung der Kernenergie") which was the official political aim of the SPD (and the other political parties at that time). He argued that the development and use of nuclear plants never could be safe and the problems with nuclear waste were impossible to solve. He became the "father of the german anti-nuclear movement" as the Manchester Guardian called him in 1981 and one of the precursors of the German Green Party. Bechert was also part of the Pugwash movement and member of the World Union for Protection of Life.

== Books ==
- Karl Bechert and Christian Gerthsen Atomphysik Bd. I Allgemeine Grundlagen (De Gruyter, 1944)
- Karl Bechert and Christian Gerthsen Atomphysik Bd. II Allgemeine Grundlagen (De Gruyter, 1944)
- Karl Bechert Der Wahnsinn des Atomkrieges (Diederichs, 1956)
- Karl Bechert Deutsche Politik im Schatten der Atomdrohung (1958)
- Karl Bechert and Christian Gerthsen Atomphysik Bd. III, Theorie des Atombaus (De Gruyter, 1963)
- Karl Bechert, Christian Gerthsen, and Arnold Flammersfeld Atomphysik. Bd. IV. Theorie des Atombaus 2. Teil (De Gruyter, Berlin, 1963)

== Selected Literature ==
- Karl Bechert and Ludwig August Sommer, "Zur Struktur des Vanadiumspektrums", Z. Phys. 31 145-162 (1925)
