= Chappie Angulo =

American-Mexican painter and illustrator (1928–2020)

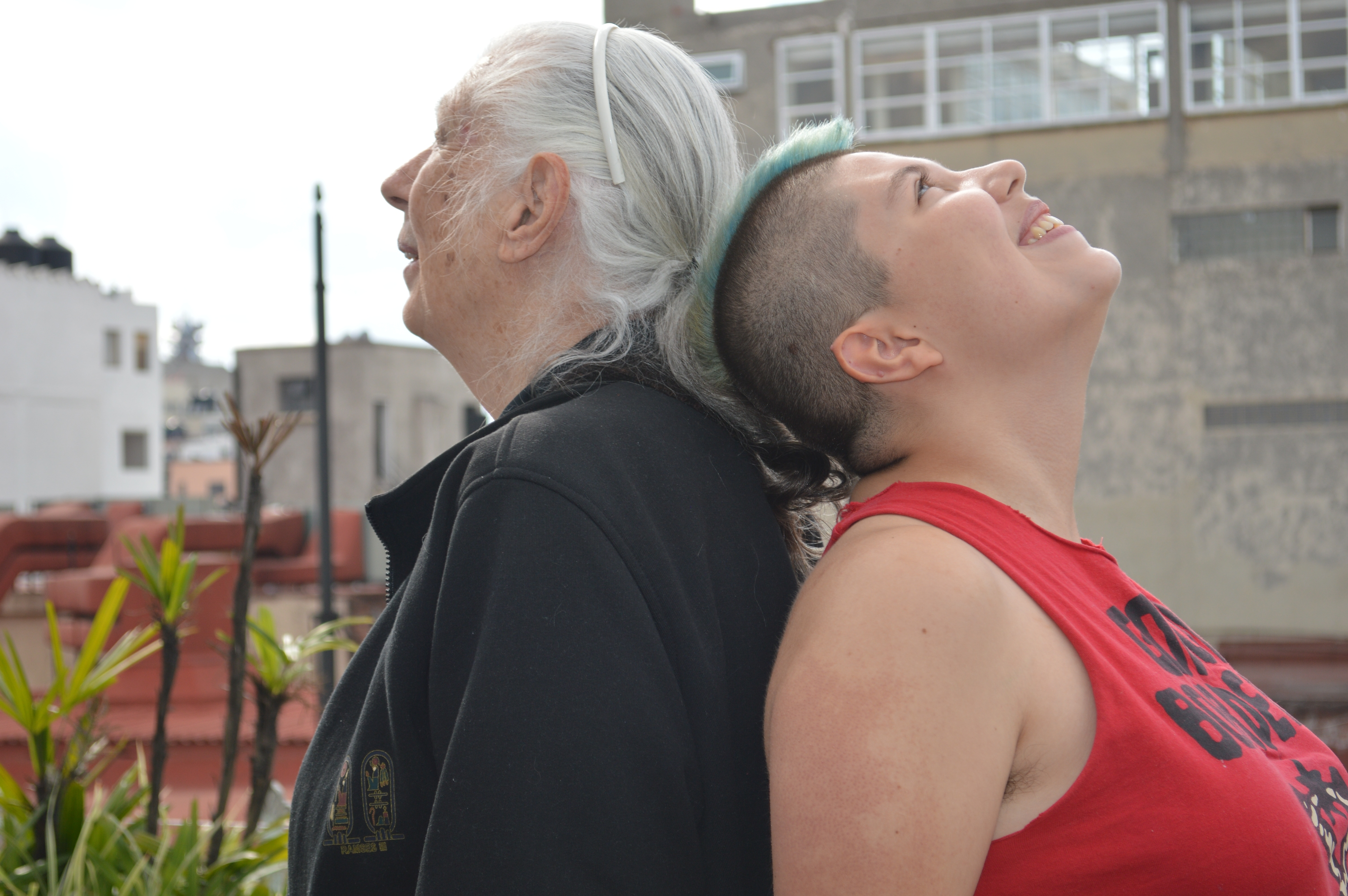
Angulo posing with granddaughter at the presentation of the book Mujeres del Salón de la Plástica Mexicana

Chappie Angulo (1928 – October 2, 2020) was an American-Mexican painter and illustrator whose work has been recognized with membership in Mexico’s Salón de la Plástica Mexicana.

== Life ==
Angulo was born Ruth Chapman Maruschok in the United States in 1928.

In 1949, she began studying art, attending the Los Angeles City College and the University of California Los Angeles. In 1954, she moved to Mexico, where she studied at the Escuela Nacional de Pintura, Escultura y Grabado "La Esmeralda". When she finished her studies there, she went to England to study at the London Art Center, spending a year and a half drawing live models and working with plaster molds.

Angulo lived in the Mexican state of Morelos. She died on October 2, 2020.

== Career ==
Angulo began her art career in 1957 collaborating with what was then called the Museo de Arqueología y Etnografía, located in the historic center of Mexico City. Here she created reproductions of various pre Hispanic murals such as those of Bonampak and Chichen Itza. When the museum moved and became the National Anthropology Museum in Chapultepec Park, much of her work was moved with it and still can be seen at the institution. Others can be found at the Teotihuacan Museum.

Her first art exhibition was held in Monterrey in 1959. Since then, she has had over twenty individual exhibitions of her work and has participated in over 100 in Mexico and abroad. Major exhibitions include those at the Museum of Modern Art (1967, 1970), Palacio de Bellas Artes (Confrontación ’68), Olympic Cultural Program (1969), and the Museo Fronterizo in Ciudad Juarez (1971).

Angulo’s work can be found the collections of the Museum of Modern Art, the Iguala Art Museum and the Museo Universitario Arte Contemporáneo.

As an illustrator her work has been published in a number of books, mostly related to the pre Hispanic history of Mexico. These include Teotihuacan-un autoretrato cultural (1964), Tlalmanalli – encomtrade en Tlatelolco (1966), Relieves de Chalcatzingo (1973), El Amanecer (1973), El Museo de Cuahtetelco : guia oficial (1978) and El Museo Cuauhnahuac en el Palacio de Cortés : recopilación histórico-arqueológica del proceso de cambio en el Edo. de Morelos (1979).

Her work has been recognized with membership in the Salón de la Plástica Mexicana.

== Artistry ==
Her early work was figurative but over time she eventually evolved towards the abstract, especially after 1969. She began to experiment with various styles and techniques that include handmade paper, monotype, photography, collage, tapestries and more. Her preferred media is acrylics.
