= Armin Schwarz (politician) =

German politician (born 1968)

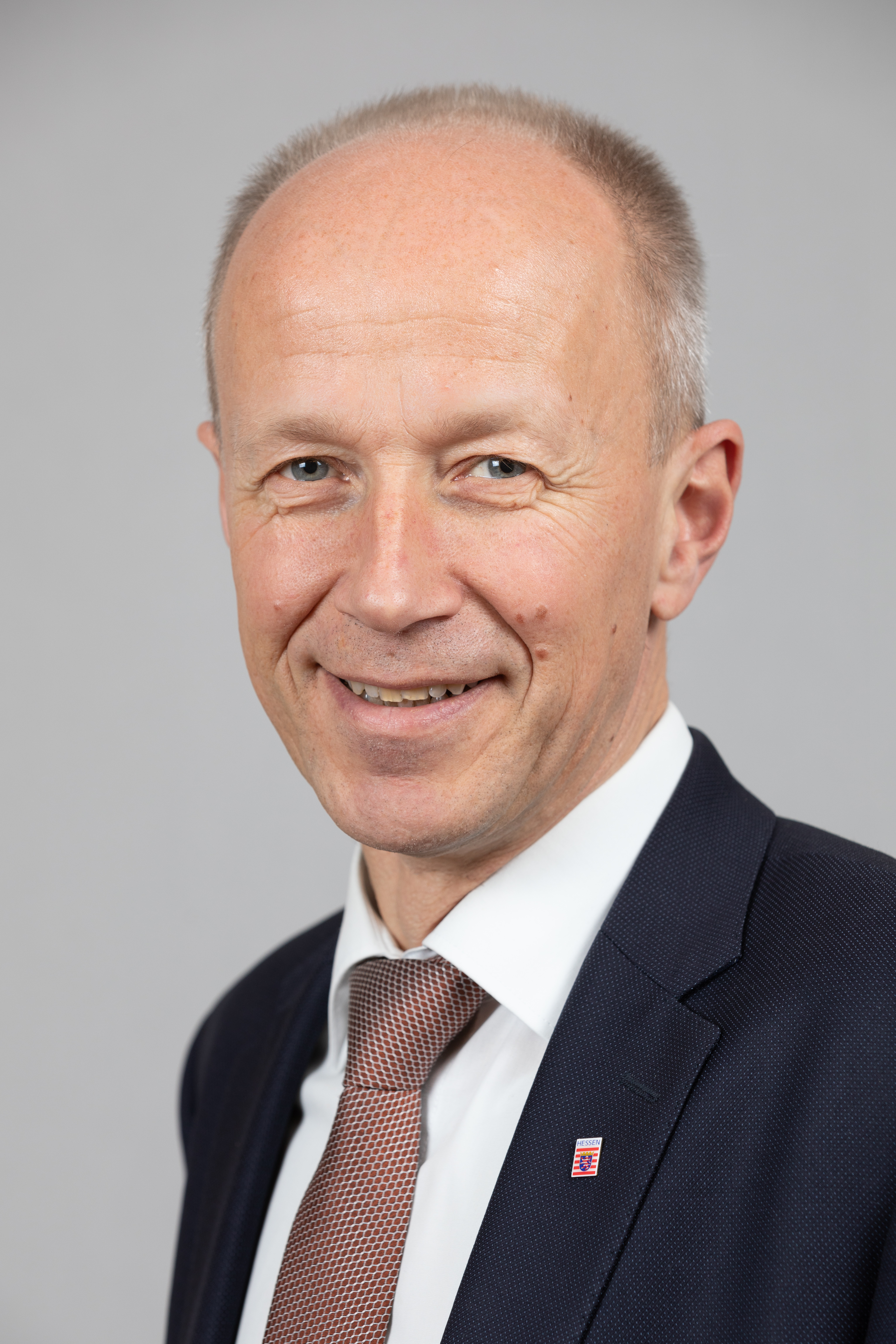
- Schwarz in 2019

Minister for Culture, Education and Opportunity of Hesse
- Incumbent
- Assumed office 18 January 2024
- Minister-President: Boris Rhein
- Preceded by: R. Alexander Lorz

Member of the Bundestag; from Hesse
- In office 26 October 2021 – 25 January 2024
- Preceded by: Multi-member district
- Succeeded by: Bettina Wiesmann
- Constituency: State list

Member of the Landtag of Hesse; for Waldeck-Frankenberg I
- In office 1 November 2011 – 1 November 2021
- Preceded by: Wilhelm Dietzel
- Succeeded by: Jan-Wilhelm Pohlmann

Personal details
- Born: 3 June 1968 (age 58) Bad Arolsen, West Germany
- Party: Christian Democratic Union
- Children: 2
- Education: Marburg University; University of Wolverhampton

Armin Schwarz (born 3 June 1968) is a German politician for the CDU.

== Biography ==
Schwarz is born in the West German settlement of Arolsen. From 2011 to 2021 Schwarz was member of th Landtag of Hesse.

From 2021 to 2024 Schwarz was member of the Bundestag, the federal diet.

Since 2024 Schwarz is minister for culture in Hesse in Second Rhein cabinet.
