= David Rosenthall =

Archdeacon of Singapore from 1945 until 1947

David Rosenthall was Archdeacon of Singapore from 1945 until 1947.

Rosenthall was educated at Queen's University Belfast and Trinity College, Dublin; and ordained in 1933. He held curacies in Clones and Monkwearmouth after which he was Chaplain to the Bishop of Victoria in Hong Kong. He was at Kowloon from 1937 to 1941; and Wellington, New Zealand from 1941 to 1945 before his time as Archdeacon and Vicar of Atherton afterwards.
