= Chappy (drummer) =

Jenő Orlay, also known as Jenő Obendorfer and who took the stage name Chappy (October 31, 1905, Budapest - March 28, 1973, Munich), was a Hungarian jazz drummer and bandleader.

Chappy first worked as a dancer in Budapest in the 1920s, and was an autodidact on drums. From 1926 to 1928 he toured Europe and recorded with Arthur Briggs, and had fielded his own band by 1930. This group toured widely, including across Europe and in Java in 1933–34. In the 1940s and 1950s he recorded extensively.

== General references ==
- "Chappy". The New Grove Dictionary of Music and Musicians. 2nd edition, ed. Barry Kernfeld, 2004.
