= Eric Rosenthal (historian) =

South African historian and author

Eric Rosenthal (10 July 1905 – 1983) was a South African historian and writer. He was born in Newlands, Cape Town, Cape Colony. He studied as an attorney, later becoming a journalist and writer of many corporate histories. He was a member of the Three Wise Men on Springbok Radio's long-running quiz show, Test the Team.

The elder of two children born to Richard Rosenthal and Hedwig De Beer, he received his first education at Parktown Preparatory School in Johannesburg, and later St. John's College. He chose to follow a legal career and qualified as an attorney at the University of the Witwatersrand. Early opportunities as a journalist saw his virtual abandoning of law. He was competent at sketching and enlivened his books with explanatory drawings.

Rosenthal was married to Jenny Bradley on 18 December 1934 in Westcliff, Johannesburg. They spent most of their married life in Fish Hoek near Cape Town.

Rosenthal has been attributed with helping write the initial batch of Chappies "Did You Know?" facts.

== Bibliography ==
- Memories & Sketches
- From Drury Lane to Mecca
- Old Time Survivals in South Africa
- Stars and Stripes in Africa
- The Fall of Italian East Africa
- Fortress on Sand
- General Dan Pienaar
- Japan's Bid for Africa
- General de Wet
- Gold Bricks and Mortar
- African Switzerland
- The South African Saturday Book
- Homes of the Golden City
- They Walk in the Night
- Pinelands
- South African Jews in World War II
- Shovel and Sieve
- Here are Diamonds
- The Hinges Creaked
- Shelter from the Spray
- Shells to Shillings
- Other Men's Millions
- Cutlass and Yardarm
- Today's News Today
- The Changing Years
- River of Diamonds
- Overdrafts and Overwork
- Apology Refused
- Heinrich Egersdörfer:an Old-Time Sketch Book
- Tankards and Tradition
- Encyclopaedia of Southern Africa. Frederick Warne and Co. Ltd. 1961. LCCN 61015433.
- Schooners and Skyscrapers
- South African Surnames
- Southern African Dictionary of National Biography. Frederick Warne and Co. Ltd. 1966. LCCN 66015690. OCLC 390499.
- History of Fish Hoek 1818-1968
- Gold! Gold! Gold!
- Meet Me at the Carlton
- You Have Been Listening
- The Rand Rush
- Victorian South Africa
- Total's Book of Southern African Records. Total South Africa. 1975. p. 160. ISBN 0-620-01923-9. OCLC 3483123. OL 4607050M.
- The Best of Eric Rosenthal
- Fish Horns and Hansom Cabs
- Rustenburg Romance
- 160 Years of Cape Town Printing
- On Change Through the Years
- 50 Years of the Cape Town Orchestra
- 50 Years of Healing
- 300 Years of the Castle at Cape Town
- The Story of The Cape Jewish Orphanage published in 1961

=== Family ===
Eric Rosenthal's grandfather was Albert Rosenthal, who settled in Middelburg in the Eastern Cape in about 1854, where he was on the board of directors of the Standard Bank of South Africa. He married the composer Pauline Emmanuel from Germany, who was a fellow music student with Engelbert Humperdinck. They produced three sons – two elder sons born in Germany, Julius (1868–1902) and Richard born 1869, and lastly Berthold born 1885 in Middelburg.
