= Yosef Rosenthal =

- Born: 14 February 1844; Suwałki, Suwałki Governorate, Russian Poland
- Died: 22 November 1913 (aged 69)
- Writing career
- Pen name: Ha-tza'ir; Eḥad mi-talmidav shel Hillel
- Language: Hebrew

Yosef Rosenthal (Yiddish: יוסף ראָזנטאַל; 14 February 1844 – 22 November 1913) was a Polish-Jewish Hebrew writer and lawyer.

== Biography ==
Born in Suwałki, Russian Poland, Rosenthal began the study of the Talmud and commentaries at an early age without the aid of a teacher, and at the same time devoted himself to the study of different languages and sciences. In the 1890s he settled at Warsaw to practise law.

Rosenthal began his literary career in 1866 by contributing philological articles to Ha-Maggid. He went on to write on science and current events for such Hebrew periodicals as Ha-Levanon, Ha-Karmel, and Ha-Melitz. The most important of his contributions is an article on the religious system of the Sefer Yetzirah, in Keneset Yisrael (1887), and some articles in Ha-Eshkol, a Hebrew encyclopedia (1887–88). He wrote also some responsa, one of which was published in Dibre Mosheh by Rabbi Moses of Namoset; and Derekh Emunah, four essays on religious philosophy (Warsaw, 1894).

He was noted as a chess player, and won the first prize at the Druzgenik tournament in 1885.
