= Raoul Plus =

French Jesuit priest and author

Raoul Plus Raoul Plus

Orders
- Ordination: 1913

Personal details
- Born: January 22, 1882
- Died: October 23, 1958 (aged 76) Lille, France

Raoul Plus, SJ (January 22, 1882 in Boulogne-sur-Mer, France – October 23, 1958 in Lille, France) was a French Jesuit priest and author.

== Life ==
He attended the Collège Notre-Dame of the Jesuits in his hometown. He entered the Jesuit novitiate at Saint-Acheul-lez-Amiens in 1899. From 1901 he lived and studied in exile due to the 1901 French law on associations, which limited the freedom of religious orders in France. He studied two years of higher rhetoric in Arlon, Belgium; three years of philosophy in Gemert, Netherlands, and in Florenne, Belgium; and four years of theology in Enghien, Belgium. During his time studying philosophy, his spiritual director was Germain Foch, SJ, a German Jesuit who taught the importance of incorporation into Christ.

Plus was ordained a priest in 1913. He served as a French Army chaplain during the First World War. He received the Croix de Guerre for his service during the war.

After a year of personal work in Enghien, Plus spent his tertianship with Father Louis Poullier in 1919–1920. During his tertianship, one of his companions was Fr. Onesimus Lacouture, SJ, whose retreat preaching would later influence Dorothy Day.

After his tertianship, Plus was appointed to the Catholic Institute of Arts and Crafts in Lille to teach religion. At the same time he was a chaplain and spiritual director and gave numerous retreats during the holidays.

From 1935 to 1939, Plus taught at the Institut Catholique de Paris, a period of great literary productivity.

During the Second World War, Plus lived in seclusion in the La Barde retreat house in the Dordogne, although he continued to preach and write. In Lille, from 1945, he was a spiritual father for the Jesuit community at Saint-Joseph College.

Plus died in 1958 in Lille.

== Author ==
The talks Plus gave to soldiers during the First World War laid the foundation for his first two books, God within Us and The Ideal of Reparation. The early books were well received for their style and teaching. He emphasized membership in the mystical body of Christ. These books and the many others he would write, more than 40 in total, were translated into English and many other languages.

Dorothy Day noted her familiarity with Plus's work in her obituary for Fr. Lacouture.

Cardinal Albert Gregory Meyer, then Archbishop of Chicago, gave two of Plus's books, How to Pray Always and How to Pray Well, as presents to his secretary Fr. Edward Egan, the future Cardinal Archbishop of New York, in 1958 or 1959.

== Works ==
Note: publication dates and titles are those of English translations.

- —— (1920). The Ideal of Reparation.
- —— (1922). God Within Us.
- —— (1940). Mary in Our Soul Life.
- —— (1944). Radiating Christ: An Appeal to Militant Catholics. Press of St. Meinrad Abbey, for the Abbey of Gethsemani.
- —— (1946). Toward the Eternal Priesthood. Pustet.
- —— (1949). The Folly of the Cross.
- ——. How to Pray Always.
- ——. How to Pray Well.
- ——. Simplicity.
- —— (1951). Christ in the Home. Pustet.
- ——. Marriage. Burns Oates and Washbourne.
- ——. In Praise of Work.
