= Chappies =

South African brand of bubble gum

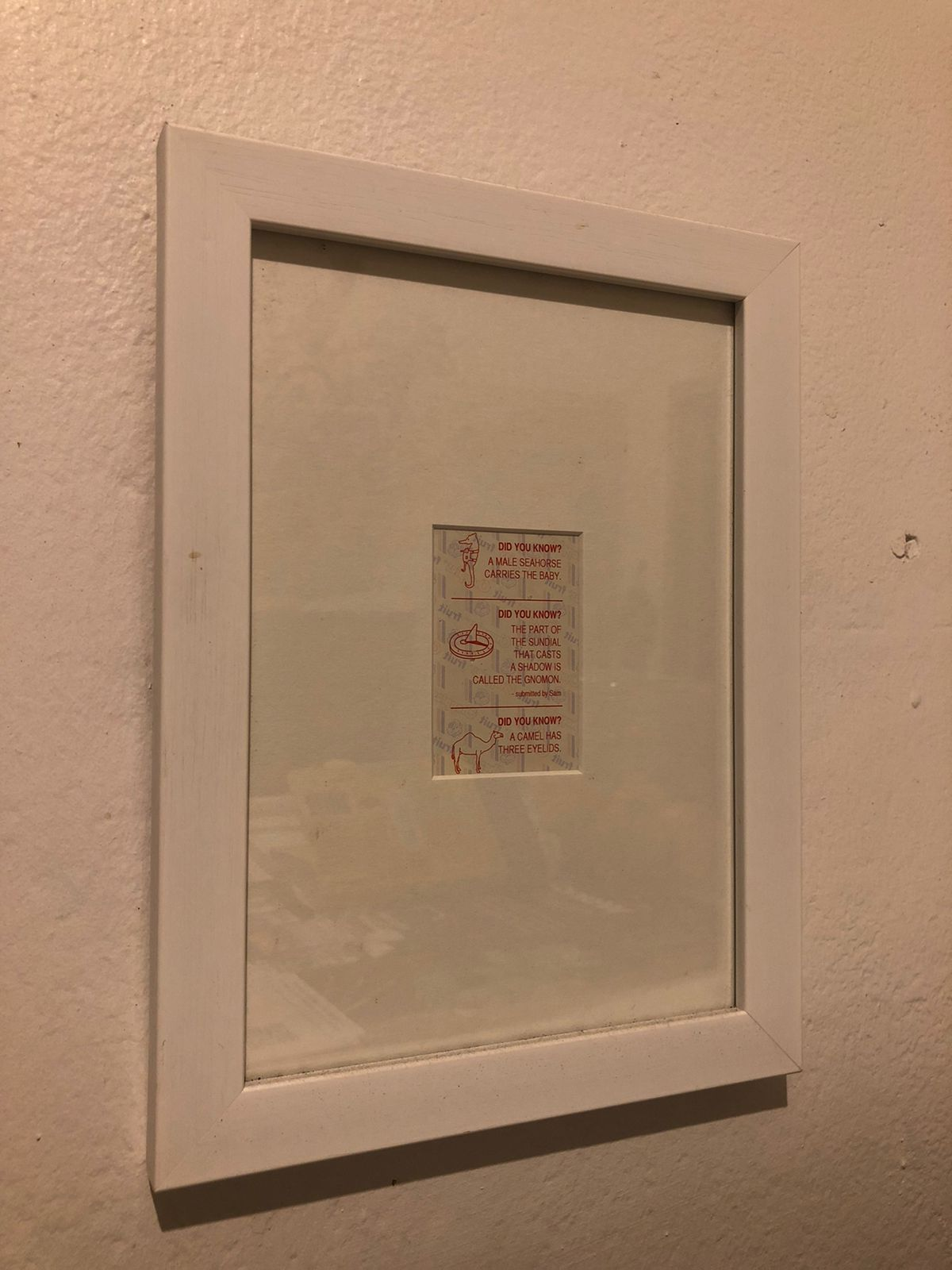
- Framed Chappie "Did You Know" wrapper.
- Product type: Bubblegum
- Current owner: Cadbury (1989), Mondelez International
- Country: South Africa
- Introduced: late-1940s
- Markets: South Africa, Congo, Zambia, Zimbabwe
- Tagline: Unwrap an Adventure
- Website: www.chappies.co.za

Chappies is a brand of bubblegum introduced in South Africa in the late 1940s. In part because of its iconic "Did You Know?" facts printed inside every wrapper, Chappies has been South Africa's best-selling bubblegum for more than 50 years with about 2.5 billion pieces being sold each year.

== Overview ==
Chappies was developed by Arthur Ginsberg, head of marketing at Johannesburg-based confectionery manufacturer, Chapelat Sweet Factory, from which the brand derived its name. Chappies was intended as a competitor for the well-established Wicks bubblegum, priced at two pieces for a penny versus Wicks' piece for a penny.

By the late 1970s the brand had spread to Zambia, the Congo area, and Rhodesia (now Zimbabwe), and held a local market share of 90%.

Chappies initially came in five flavours: lemon, orange, strawberry, cherry, and pineapple. 70 years later the remaining flavours are spearmint, assorted fruit, watermelon, grape, and cool cherry.

The Chappies brand was sold to Cadbury in 1989, which is currently under Mondelēz International.

== Popularity ==
Chappies is a genericised trademark. The brand name became synonymous with the word bubblegum in part because shopkeepers used it in lieu of coins to give change to patrons, and because of the inclusion of "Did You Know?" trivia.

The original-flavour wrapper has had a distinctive yellow wrapper with red and blue stripes since launch. The striped wrapper, bright colour squares of gum, logo and cartoon chipmunk character are synonymous with the Chappies brand and have been used in collaborations with brands such as Shelflife, the unreleased Reebok range and with rapper Emtee for a music video.

== Marketing ==
=== Chappies facts ===
The Chappies "Did You Know?" facts were initially a way to make the bubblegum more appealing to children.

The first 'Did you Know?' facts were sourced from the "Three Wise Men" on Springbok Radio's "Test The Team", a popular quiz programme featuring Eric Rosenthal, Arthur Blexley and Dennis Glauber. Chappies later approached academics from Ginsberg's alma mater, Wits University to come up with lists of interesting facts, resulting in an estimated 5,000 facts.

=== Brand refresh ===
In early 2008, marketing firm Berge Farrel was contracted by Cadbury to rejuvenate the now almost 50-year-old Chappies identity. Their changes included redesigned packaging as well as an updated yet still recognisable mascot, the Chappies Chipmunk. He was made to look younger and lost his walking cane.

=== 2012 national campaign for new facts ===
In 2012 Chappies gave fans the chance to submit their own ‘Did You Know?’ facts for inclusion in the famous Chappies wrappers which resulted in over 50 000 submissions entered through various digital channels. After a validation process, 170 facts, and accompanying illustrations by Jaco Hassbroek, were selected to be printed on millions of wrappers.

Competition finalists received a year's supply of Chappies and a framed wrapper with their submitted fact.

=== Edible Street Art ===
Chappies launched an Edible Street Art campaign that turned six user-submitted facts into artworks made out of thousands of real Chappies bubblegum pieces. The largest of the six murals took 177 681 pieces of Chappies to create and 15 hours to complete but just 15 minutes to disassemble thanks to help from the public.
