= Esther Dilcher =

German politician (born 1965)

Esther Dilcher MdB
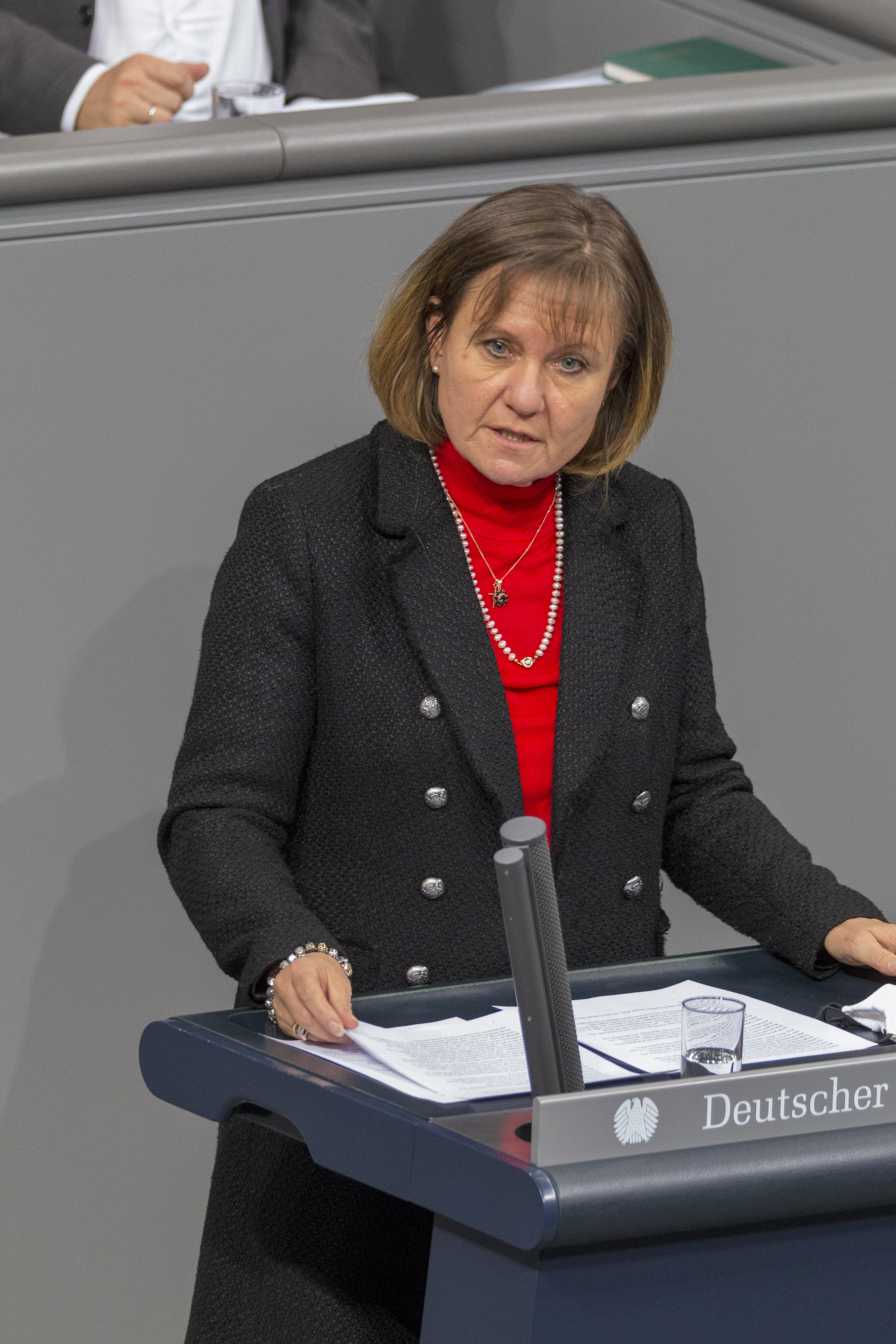
- Dilcher in 2020

Member of the Bundestag; from Hesse
- Incumbent
- Assumed office 24 October 2017
- Preceded by: Thomas Viesehon
- Constituency: Waldeck (2017–2025); State list (2025–present)

Personal details
- Born: 18 September 1965 (age 61) Hofgeismar, West Germany
- Party: Social Democratic
- Children: 3
- Education: University of Marburg

Esther Dilcher (born 18 September 1965) is a German lawyer and politician of the Social Democratic Party (SPD) who has been serving as a member of the Bundestag from the state of Hesse since 2017.

== Early life and career ==
Dilcher grew up in Hofgeismar. There she took her school-leaving examination at the Albert-Schweitzer-School and then studied law at the University of Marburg. Dilcher has been working as a lawyer and notary since 1999.

== Political career ==
Dilcher became a member of the Bundestag in the 2017 German federal election, representing the Waldeck district.

In parliament, Dilcher is a member of the Committee on Legal Affairs and Consumer Protection; the Subcommittee on European Law; and the Budget Committee. She serves as her parliamentary group's rapporteur on the annual budget of the Federal Ministry of Justice and Consumer Protection.

In 2019 Dilcher also joined parliamentary body in charge of appointing judges to the Highest Courts of Justice, namely the Federal Court of Justice (BGH), the Federal Administrative Court (BVerwG), the Federal Fiscal Court (BFH), the Federal Labour Court (BAG), and the Federal Social Court (BSG). Since 2022, she has been a member of the Commission for the Reform of the Electoral Law and the Modernization of Parliamentary Work, co-chaired by Johannes Fechner and Nina Warken.

== Other activities ==
- Stiftung Forum Recht, Member of the Board of Trustees (since 2022)
