= Matthias Kuhle =

German geographer (1948–2015)

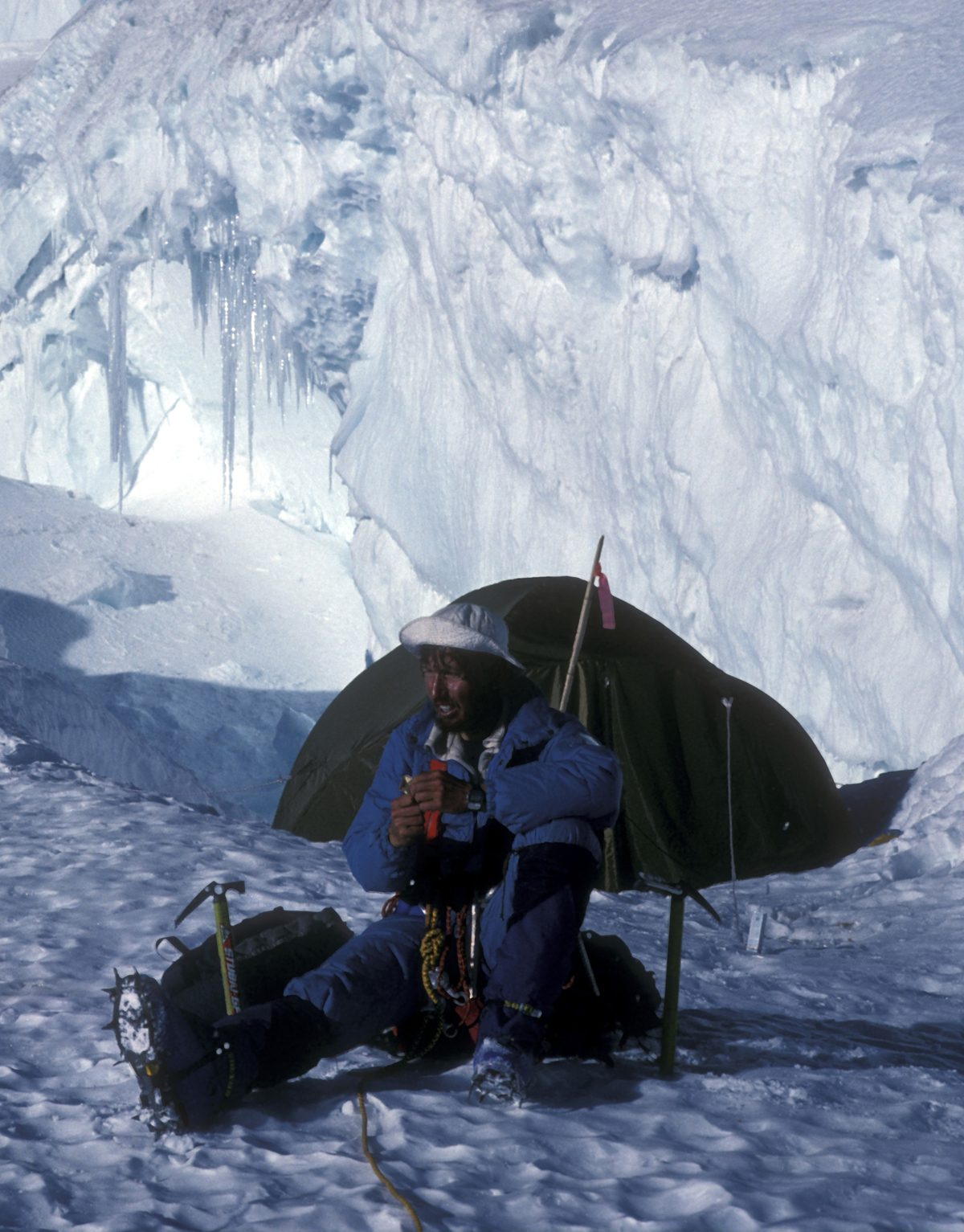
- Matthias Kuhle (Everest north slope, Central Rongbuk Glacier)
- Born: April 20, 1948
- Died: April 25, 2015 (aged 67)

Matthias Kuhle (20 April 1948 – 25 April 2015) was a German geographer and professor at the University of Göttingen. He edited the book series Geography International published by Shaker Verlag.

Kuhle died on 25 April 2015 in a major earthquake in Nepal.

== Education and career ==
Kuhle studied German philology, geography, and philosophy at the Free University of Berlin. He graduated in 1972 (Staatsexamen) and moved to the University of Göttingen for Ph.D. work. His Ph.D. in the natural sciences (Dr. rer. nat) was conferred in 1975 for work on geography, geology and philosophy. His Ph.D. dissertation was a monograph on the geomorphology and former glaciation of South-Iranian high mountains. In 1980 he achieved his habilitation in Geography with a monograph titled Dhaulagiri- and Annapurna Himalaya: A Contribution to the Geomorphology of Extreme High Mountains. He was appointed professor of geography at the University of Göttingen in 1983, and promoted to the chair for Geography and High Mountain Geomorphology in 1990.

His main areas of research were the mountain ranges and plateaus of High- and Central Asia, the Andes, and the Arctic. Since 1973 he undertook several multi-months research expeditions.

Kuhle's priority program of research was High Mountain Ecology, Periglacial and Glacial Geomorphology, Climatology, Ice Age research (Paleoclimatology), Glaciology and Science Theory. His work focuses on the reconstruction of the former ice cover of High and Central Asia caused by the plate tectonic-induced uplift of the Tibetan Plateau and surrounding mountain areas above the snowline. His theory of Ice Age Development during the Pleistocene is based on this reconstruction and measurements of radiation energy and budget in subtropic areas of high altitude. Kuhle's idea of an ice sheet covering practically the entire Tibetan Plateau has been opposed by several glacial geologists (cf. Derbyshire et al. 1991; Rutter 1995; Zheng and Rutter 1998; Owen et al. 2005; Lehmkuhl and Owen 2005).

== Publications ==
- Kuhle, M. (1982): Was spricht für eine pleistozäne Inlandvereisung Hochtibets? Sitzungsberichte u. Mittl. d. Braunschweigischen Wissenschaft. Gesellsch. 6 (Sonderbd: Die Chinesisch/Deutsche Tibet-Expedition 1981, Braunschweig-Symposium vom 14.-16.04.1982), 68-77
- (1983): A New Expedition in Tibet - a Contribution to Climatology and High Mountain Research. Universitas 25 (1), 59-63
- (1985): Glaciation Research in the Himalayas: A New Ice Age Theory. Universitas 27 (4), 281-294
- (1985): Ein subtropisches Inlandeis als Eiszeitauslöser. Südtibet- und Mt. Everest-Expedition 1984. Georgia Augusta, Nachrichten aus der Universität Göttingen 42, 35-51
- (1986): Die Vergletscherung Tibets und die Entstehung von Eiszeiten. Spektrum der Wissenschaften; Scientific American 9/86, 42-54
- (1987): The Problem of a Pleistocene Inland Glaciation of the Northeastern Qinghai-Xizang-Plateau. - Reports on the NE-Part of Quinghai-Xizang (Tibet)-Plateau by the Sino-German Scientific Expedition 1981. (Eds: Hövermann, J.; Wenjing, W.) Science Press, Beijing, 250-315
- (1987): Subtropical Mountain- and Highland-Glaciation as Ice Age Triggers and the Waning of the Glacial Periods in the Pleistocene. GeoJournal 14 (4), 393-421
- (1987): Die Wiege der Eiszeit. Geo 1987 (2), 80-94
- (1988): Eine reliefspezifische Eiszeittheorie. Nachweis einer tibetischen Inlandvereisung und ihrer energetischen Konsequenzen. Die Geowissenschaften 6 (5), 142–150.
- (1988): Zur Auslöserrolle Tibets bei der Entstehung von Eiszeiten. Spektrum der Wissenschaften; Scientific American 1/88, 16-20
- (1988): The Pleistocene Glaciation of Tibet and the Onset of Ice Ages- An Autocycle Hypothesis. GeoJournal 17 (4, Tibet and High-Asia. Results of the Sino-German Joint Expeditions I), 581-596
- (1988): Geomorphological Findings on the Build-up of Pleistocene Glaciation in Southern Tibet, and on the Problem of Inland Ice. Results of the Shisha Pangma and Mt. Everest Expedition 1984. GeoJournal 17 (4, Tibet and High-Asia, Results of the Sino-German Joint Expeditions I), 457-513
- (1989): Die Inlandvereisung Tibets als Basis einer in der Globalstrahlungsgeometrie fuβenden, reliefspezifischen Eiszeittheorie. Petermanns Geographische Mitteilungen 133 (4), 265-285
- (1991): Observations Supporting the Pleistocene Inland Glaciation of High Asia. GeoJournal 25 (2/3, Tibet and High Asia II, Results of the Sino-German Joint Expeditions), 133-233
- (1994): Present and Pleistocene Glaciation on the North-Western Margin of Tibet between the Karakorum Main Ridge and the Tarim Basin Supporting the Evidence of a Pleistocene Inland Glaciation in Tibet. GeoJournal 33 (2/3, Tibet and High Asia III, Results of the Sino-German and Russian-German Joint Expeditions), 133-272
- (1997): New Findings concerning the Ice Age (Last Glacial Maximum) Glacier Cover of the East-Pamir, of the Nanga Parbat up to the Central Himalaya and of Tibet, as well as the Age of the Tibetan Inland Ice. GeoJournal 42 (2-3, Tibet and High Asia IV. Results of Investigations into High Mountain Geomorphology, Paleo- Glaciology and Climatology of the Pleistocene (Ice Age Research)), 87-257
- (1998): Reconstruction of the 2.4 Million qkm Late Pleistocene Ice Sheet on the Tibetan Plateau and its Impact on the Global Climate. Quaternary International 45/46, 71-108 (Erratum: Vol. 47/48:173-182 (1998) included)
- (1999): Reconstruction of an approximately complete Quaternary Tibetan Inland Glaciation between the Mt. Everest- and Cho Oyu Massifs and the Aksai Chin. - A new glaciogeomorphological southeast–northwest diagonal profile through Tibet and its consequences for the glacial isostasy and Ice Age cycle. GeoJournal 47 (1-2, Tibet and High Asia V, Results of Investigations into High Mountain Geomorphology, Paleo-Glaciology and Climatology of the Pleistocene), 3-276
- (1999): The Uplift of Tibet above the Snowline and its Complete Glaciation as Trigger of the Quaternary Ice Ages - A Hypothesis for the Ice Age Development. - Geological Society of America (GSA) Publications 31, 141
- (2001): The Tibetan Ice Sheet; its Impact on the Palaeomonsoon and Relation to the Earth's Orbital Variations. Polarforschung 71 (1/2), 1-13
- (2001): The maximum Ice Age (LGM) glaciation of the Central- and South Karakorum: an investigation of the heights of its glacier levels and ice thickness as well as lowest prehistoric ice margin positions in the Hindukush, Himalaya and in East-Tibet on the Minya Konka-massif. GeoJournal 54 (1-4), 55 (1) (Tibet and High Asia VI, Glaciogeomorphology and Prehistoric Glaciation in the Karakorum and Himalaya), 109-396
- (2002): The Glaciation of High Asia and its Causal Relation to the Onset of Ice Ages. Die Erde 132, 339-359
- (2002): A relief-specific model of the ice age on the basis of uplift-controlled glacier areas in Tibet and the corresponding albedo increase as well as their positive climatological feedback by means of the global radiation geometry. Climate Research 20, 1-7
- (2003): New geomorphological indicators of a former Tibetan ice sheet in the central and northeastern part of the high plateau. Zeitschrift f. Geomorphologie N.F. Suppl.-Vol.130, 75-97
- (2004): The High Glacial (Last Ice Age and LGM) ice cover in High and Central Asia. Development in Quaternary Science 2c (Quaternary Glaciation - Extent and Chronology, Part III: South America, Asia, Africa, Australia, Antarctica, Eds: Ehlers, J.; Gibbard, P.L.), 175–199, Elsevier B.V., Amsterdam
- (2004): Past glacier (Würmian) ice thickness in the Karakoram and on the Deosai Plateau in the catchment area of the Indus river. E&G Quaternary Science Journal (Eiszeitalter u. Gegenwart) 54, 95-123
- (2005): Glacial geomorphology and ice ages in Tibet and surrounding mountains. The Island Arc 14 (4), 346–367, Blackwell Publishing Asia Pty Ltd
- (2005): The maximum Ice Age (Würmian, Last Ice Age, LGM) glaciation of the Himalaya- a glaciogeomorphological investigation of glacier trim-lines, ice thicknesses and lowest former ice margin positions in the Mt. Everest-Makalu-Cho Oyu massifs (Khumbu and Khumbakarna Himal) including information on late-glacial, neoglacial and historical glacier stages, their snow-line depressions and ages. GeoJournal 62 No.3-4 (Tibet and High Asia VII: Glaciogeomorphology and Former Glaciation in the Himalaya and Karakorum), 191-650
- (2007): Critical Approach to the Methods of Glacier Reconstruction in High Asia (Qinghai-Xizang Tibet) Plateau, West Sichuan Plateau, Himalaya, Karakorum, Pamir, Kuenlun, Tienshan) and discussion of the probability of a Qinghai-Xizang (Tibetan) inland ice. Journal of Mountain Science Vol.4 No.2, 91–123.
- (2007(erschienen 2008)): The Pleistocene Glaciation (LGP and pre-LGP, pre-LGM) of SE-Iranian Mountains exemplified by the Kuh-i-Jupar, Kuh-i-Lalezar and Kuh-i-Hezar Massifs in the Zagros. Polarforschung 77 (2-3), 71-88 (Erratum/ Clarification Figur 15 betreffend: Vol. 78 (1-2), 83, 2008 [erschienen 2009])
- (2008): Correspondence to-online-edition (doi.10.1016/jj.quascirev.2007.09.015 Elsevier) of Quaternary Science Reviews (QSR) article "Quaternary glacier history of the Central Karakorum" by Yeong Bae Seong et al. In: Quaternary Science Reviews, Volume 27, S. 1655–1656.
- Kuhle, M., Kuhle, S. (2010): Review on Dating methods: Numerical Dating in the Quaternary of High Asia. In: Journal of Mountain Science (2010) 7: 105–122.
- Kuhle, M. (2011): Ice Age. In: Encyclopedia of Snow, Ice and Glaciers. Eds: V. P.Singh, P. Singh, U. K. Haritashya, 560–565, Springer.
- (2011): Last Glacial Maximum Glaciation (LGM/LGP) in High Asia (Tibet and surrounding Mountains). In: Encyclopedia of Snow, Ice and Glaciers. Eds: V. P. Singh, P. Singh, U. K. Haritashya, 697–702, Springer.
- (2011): Ice Age Development Theory. In: Encyclopedia of Snow, Ice and Glaciers. Eds: V. P. Singh, P. Singh, U. K. Haritashya, 576–581, Springer.
- (2011): Reconstruction of the last glaciations in the whole of Asia. In: Encyclopedia of Snow, Ice and Glaciers. Eds: V. P. Singh, P. Singh, U. K. Haritashya, 924–932, Springer.
- (2011): The High Glacial (Last Ice Age and Last Glacial Maximum) Ice Cover of High and Central Asia, with a Critical Review of Some Recent OSL and TCN Dates. Development in Quaternary Science, Vol. 15 (d, Quaternary Glaciation - Extent and Chronology, A Closer Look, Eds: Ehlers, J.; Gibbard, P.L.; Hughes, P.D.), 943–965. (Elsevier B.V., Amsterdam).
- (2011): The High Glacial (LGP, LGM, MIS 3–2) southern outlet glaciers of the Tibetan inland ice through Mustang into the Thak Khola as further evidence of the Tibetan ice. Journal of Nepal Geological Society (JNGS), Vol. 43 (Special Issue), 175–200.
- (2012): High-glacial (LGP, LGM, MIS 3–2) ice cover in the middle Marsyandi Nadi and the Damodar-Himal down to the junction of the Nar Khola and the Marsyandi Khola (N of Annapurna Himalaya). In: Hartmann, M. & Weipert, J. (Eds.). Biodiversity and Natural Heritage of the Himalaya. Vol. IV, (Biodiversität und Naturausstattung im Himalaya), Erfurt, pp. 9–46.
- (2012): The Early and Late Glacial High Mountain Glaciation Surrounding Tibet as Topographic-Climatic Cause of High-Energetic Glacial Lake Outburst Floods (GLOFs) and their Sedimentological Consequences in the Lower Mountain Forelands. In: Horizons in Earth Science Research. Volume 7. Eds. Benjamin Veress & Jozsi Szigethy, 197 – 227; Nova Science Publisher, Inc. New York, ISBN 978-1-62100-622-0.
- (2012): The Former Tibetan Ice Sheet. In: Ice Sheets. Eds: Müller, J.; Koch, L.; Hauppauge, NY, 173–203, Nova Science Publishers, Inc.
