= Richard Rosenthal =

Richard Rosenthal may refer to:

- Richard P. Rosenthal, writer, law enforcement officer, Chief of police
- Rick Rosenthal (born 1949), American film director
- Dick Rosenthal (1933–2024), American basketball player
- Richard H. Rosenthal, former owner of F&W Publications Inc., and spouse of Lois Rosenthal
