= Simon Rinalducci =

Blessed Simon Rinalducci
- Blessed Simon depicted in stained glass

Friar, Preacher
- Born: late 13th century Todi, Italy
- Died: 20 April 1322; Bologna, Italy
- Venerated in: Roman Catholic Church
- Beatified: 19 March 1833 by Pope Gregory XVI (cultus confirmed)
- Feast: 20 April

Simon Rinalducci of Todi was a famous Italian Augustinian friar and preacher of the 13th century.

== Life ==
Rinalducci became an Augustinian friar in 1280. By that time he was already notable for his theological studies. He was a lector, prior of several houses, rumored miracle worker, and in his time, a famous preacher. He was eventually raised to the position of Augustinian provincial prior in Umbria. An episode in his life involves a general chapter conference in 1318, during which he was unjustly accused of several serious charges. Simon chose to keep silence rather than incite scandal among his brothers, and he was eventually acquitted.

Contemporary chronicler Jordan of Quedlinburg writes about this episode in his Life of the Brethren:

There was a man in our Order of great holiness and greatly revered, Brother Simon of Todi. He was a lector, and was prior of many houses, as well as prior provincial. At a chapter meeting at which I was present, though he himself was not, some serious accusations were made against him by certain rivals of his before the prior general. The accusations were accepted at face value, and as a result he had to suffer many troubles and some very insulting reproaches. Nonetheless he knew that "by your endurance you will save your soul," and so he patiently endured all the heavy charges brought against him, for the sake of him who suffered insult and terrors for us. At length he was appointed as preacher in Bologna on account of his very pleasant manner of speaking, and there he provided the people with abundant instruction by his teaching and with very beneficial guidance by the example of his life.

In May 1311, it is recorded that the bishop of Terni gave the Augustinians of his episcopal see a church in the diocese chiefly at the request of Rinalducci, whom he held as a very close friend.

Rinalducci died at Bologna in the monastery of Saint James the Great on 20 April 1322.

== Veneration ==
Blessed Simon's relics are venerated at the monastery in Bologna where he died. His feast day is celebrated 20 April, especially in the Augustinian Order. Blessed Simon's cultus was confirmed by Pope Gregory XVI on 19 March 1833.
