= Pauline Rosenthal =

German choral conductor and composer

Pauline Emmanuel Rosenthal (1845–1912) was a German choral conductor and composer who lived in South Africa for many years.

Rosenthal was born in Aachen, Germany. She studied music at the Cologne Conservatory, where one of her classmates was Engelbert Humperdinck.

Rosenthal married Albert Rosenthal and they had three sons: Julius, Richard, and Berthold. Their grandson (Richard’s son) was the South African historian Eric Rosenthal.They moved to Middelburg, Eastern Cape, South Africa, where Albert was on the Standard Bank of South Africa board of directors, returning to Germany frequently. While in Middelburg, Rosenthal conducted a choral society, taught, and performed.

Rosenthal lived in Hanover, Germany, for several years where she socialized with the violinist Joseph Joachim and other musicians. She died in Kassel in 1912.

Rosenthal’s music was published by Breitkopf & Haertel, and included the vocal works “Golden Wedding” and “Volkslied,” both dedicated to Lord Milner [Alfred Milner, 1st Viscount Milner].
