= Robert Rosenthal =

Robert Rosenthal may refer to:

- Robert Rosenthal (psychologist) (1933–2024), German-born social psychologist
- Robert Rosenthal (USAAF officer) (1917–2007), U.S. Air Force pilot during World War II
- Robert W. Rosenthal (1945–2002), American economist
- Robert Rosenthal (businessman) (born 1949), Long Island businessman and wealth management professional
- Robert Jon Rosenthal (born 1948), journalist and newspaper editor
