= Trevor Blakemore =

English writer

Trevor Ramsey Villiers Blakemore (13 October 1879 – 8 July 1953) was an English poet and author.

== Early life ==
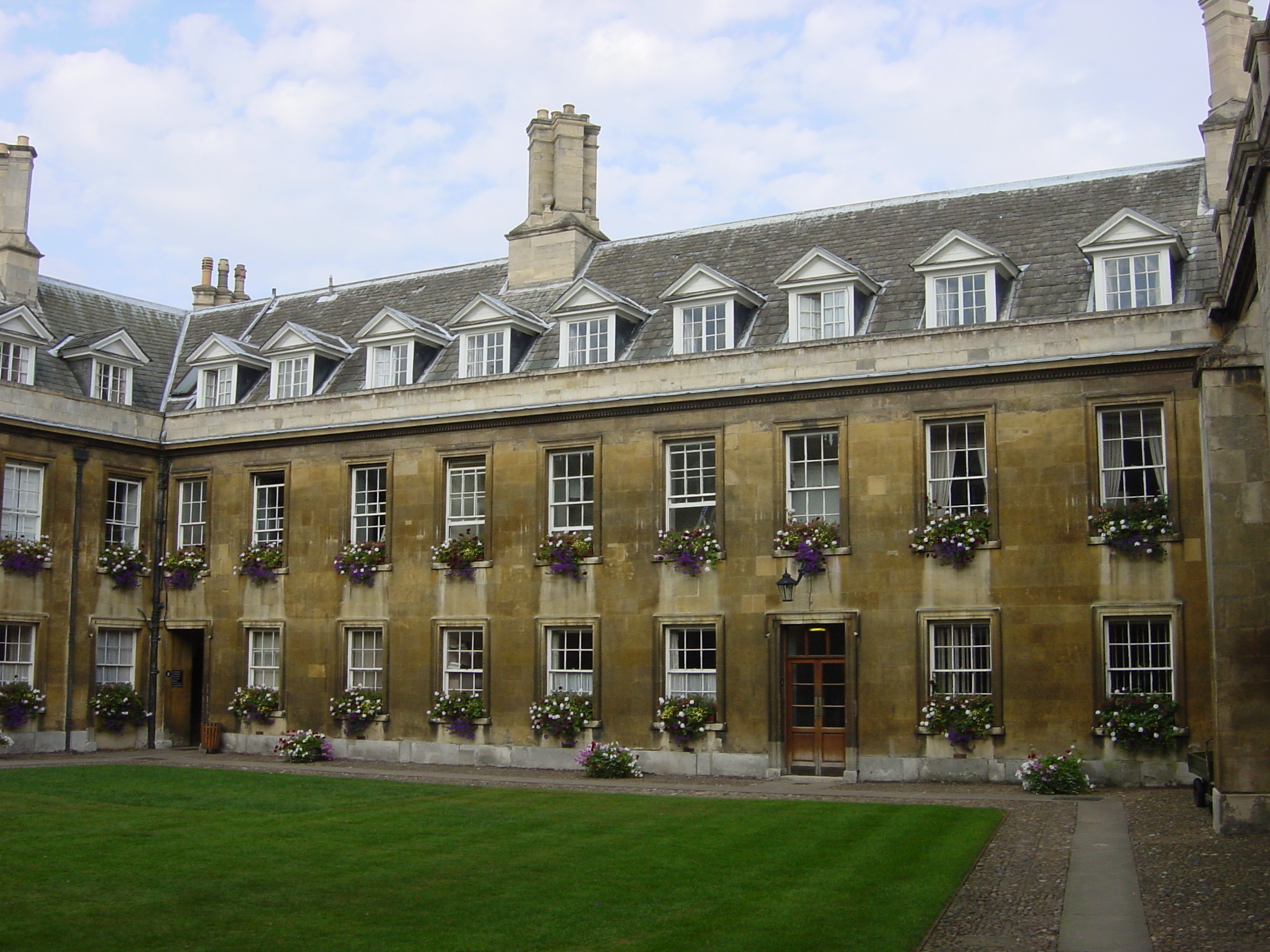
Gonville & Caius College

Born in Chislehurst, Kent, Blakemore was the son of Ramsey Blakemore, a merchant, of St Leonards-on-Sea, and Anna Maria Elizabeth Baynes, who had married at Wimbledon in 1867. He had an older sister, Ethel Agnes Annette, born about 1872. His father died in 1891.

He was educated at Hurst Court School, Hastings, Wellington College, and Gonville and Caius College, Cambridge, where he was admitted on 1 October 1897 and graduated BA in 1900.

== Career ==
Apart from his work as a poet, Blakemore was the author of a biography of the painter Herbert Schmalz, published in 1911.

In the 1920s, Blakemore spent part of his life on Sark in the Channel Islands, and much of his poetry was inspired by the island.

In the 1930s, Blakemore was a member of the selection committee of the Right Book Club, with Anthony Ludovici, Norman Thwaites, Collinson Owen, and W. A. Foyle.

In 1955, after Blakemore's death, Poems by Trevor Blakemore was published by Neville Spearman, edited by Robert Gittings and Ann Blakemore, with a foreword by Sir Compton Mackenzie.

== Personal life ==
In 1911, Blakemore was living in Devonshire Terrace, Lancaster Gate, London W2, with his widowed mother, an older sister, and three servants. His mother died in 1928, and his sister in 1947.

On Saturday 6 September 1947 at St James Church on Lancaster Gate, Blakemore married Ann Florence May Driver, whom he had known since 1932.; Ann Driver was a broadcaster for BBC School Radio and her brother was the headmaster of Spalding Grammar School.

At the time of his death, in 1953, they were living at 4, Devonshire Terrace, where he died. He left a personal estate valued at £62,728, equivalent to £1,490,913 in 2025.

In his introduction to Poems by Trevor Blakemore, Compton Mackenzie said:

Trevor Blakemore had as great a capacity for enjoying himself as any man I have met. Good wine, good food, good company, good books, a fine day in Spring, a Summer swim – all simple enough pleasures, but for him every one was the peak attainable by man. Enthusiasm can be tiresome; the enthusiasm of Trevor Blakemore was infectious. He bubbled like champagne.

In the 1958 New Year Honours, Blakemore's widow was appointed a Member of the Order of the British Empire for services to the musical education of children.

== Publications ==
- Trevor Blakemore, The art of Herbert Schmalz : with monographs on certain pictures by various writers, and 64 illustrations (London: George Allen, 1911)
- Trevor Blakemore, Poems And Ballads (London: Elkin Mathews, 1912)
- Trevor Blakemore, The Flagship and Other Poems (London: Erskine MacDonald, 1915)
- Trevor Blakemore, China Clay, illustrated by Molly MacArthur (W. Heffer & Sons, 1922)
- Trevor Blakemore, Moonset and Other Poems (London: Elkin Mathews, 1924)
- Trevor Blakemore, Elementals (London: W. & G. Foyle, 1935)
- William Alwyn, 3 Songs to Words by Trevor Blakemore (1940)
- The Ballades of Trevor Blakemore (1955)
- Poems by Trevor Blakemore, with foreword by Compton Mackenzie (London: Neville Spearman, 1955)
