= Norman Thwaites =

Norman Graham Thwaites CBE MVO MC (1872–1956) was a British soldier, intelligence officer, foreign correspondent, editor, and diplomat.

Born in Birmingham, Thwaites was the son of the Rev. Henry Graham Thwaites, a Church of England clergyman, and Clara Jane Hepworth, who had married in 1869. He was baptized by his father at St Mark's Church, Birmingham, on 28 July 1872.

Thwaites became an assistant to Joseph Pulitzer. During the First World War, he was commissioned into the Army Service Corps and in June 1915 was promoted from temporary Lieutenant to temporary Captain. He worked in intelligence in New York City and recruited the spy Sidney Reilly. In March 1918, he was promoted from temporary Captain to temporary Major. He saw active service during the war, retiring with the rank of Lieutenant Colonel and receiving the Military Cross.

In 1919, Thwaites married Eleanor Lucia Whitridge, a daughter of Frederick W. Whitridge, of New York, and they had two sons and two daughters.

In December 1919, Thwaites was Director of the British Mission, New York, and on the occasion of the visit of the Prince of Wales to the US, Thwaites was appointed a member of the Royal Victorian Order.

In 1934, Thwaites chaired meetings of the January Club. Later in the 1930s, he was a member of the selection committee of the Right Book Club, with Anthony Ludovici, Trevor Blakemore, Collinson Owen, and W. A. Foyle. In 1934, he was living at 34, Hyde Park Gate, and Barley End, Tring.

In his work “The Menace of Aerial Gas Bombardment” (1935), published by the New Commonwealth Society, Thwaites warned that Russia was openly preparing for chemical warfare and described the horrors of gas warfare. He proposed as a solution the abolition of all national air forces for military purposes and the setting up of an international air force.
