= Margaret Cameron (writer) =

American writer and musician (1867–1947)

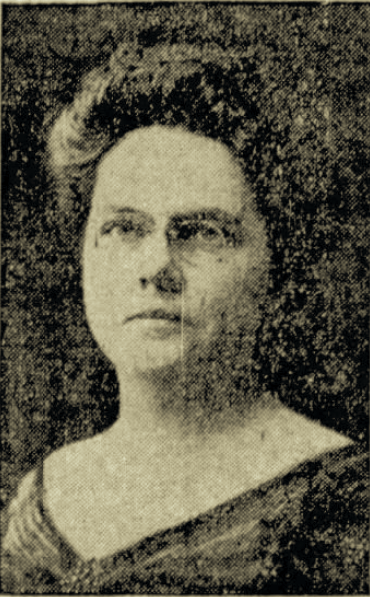
- Born: December 21, 1867; Ottawa, Illinois, U.S.
- Died: February 4, 1947 (aged 79); Winter Park, Florida, U.S.
- Occupations: musician; author
- Spouses: Harrison Cass Lewis (m. 1903; died 1926); Maxwell Alexander Kilvert (m. 1929)
- Writing career
- Genres: novels; short stories; plays; non-fiction
- Subject: mysticism
- Notable works: The Involuntary Chaperon; The Seven Purposes

Margaret Cameron (after first marriage, Lewis; after second marriage, Kilvert; December 21, 1867 – February 4, 1947) was an American musician and writer. Most of Cameron's writing was humorous. May Lamberton Becker, outlining in the New York Evening Post a course of study in American humor, mentioned Margaret Cameron as one of the three women humorists thus far produced by the country. Cameron wrote several one-act plays for amateurs, a variety of short stories, two books on travel, one of which, The Involuntary Chaperon, was considered to be the first South American travel book published in the U.S.; and a novel, Johndover. Her book, The Seven Purposes has been considered the first book written in the U.S. concerning psychic phenomena to be widely circulated.

== Early life and education ==
Margaret Cameron was born in Ottawa, Illinois, December 21, 1867. She was the daughter of Alexander Tulloch Cameron, a lawyer, Scotch born, but brought to the U.S. in 1842. Her mother was Nancy Anna Nelson, born in Erie, Pennsylvania, of Scotch and English ancestry. Her father struggled with an illness contracted in the American Civil War, and when Margaret was nine years old, the family moved from Illinois to Santa Barbara, California, hoping thereby to benefit his health. Mr. Cameron died at the age of 37, when Margaret wasten years old.

Mrs. Cameron was determined to find a occupation to bring in additional income due to her husband's passing. As she was good at making clothing, she went East, taking Margaret with her, to spend the winter of 1879 to 1880 in Chicago, with a woman who had formerly been her dressmaker, returning to Santa Barbara to open a dressmaking establishment. She would later find success in this endeavor.

At fourteen, Margaret was admitted to a club focused around Shakespeare. She was encouraged to experiment in various branches of art. Margaret had low amounts of success. She decided to become a musician after she and her mother had moved to San Francisco in 1884 and began to study the piano.

== Career ==
=== Music ===
She was a gifted teacher and when, two years later, in Oakland, California, she began to teach pupils in the rudiments of music, her ability to impart what she knew, and a liking for doing it, increased her class and brought her an income sufficient for her small needs. So the mother continued her work, and the daughter, practicing three or four hours a day and teaching the rest of the time, more often than not spent her vacations under a physician's care, worn out by hard work. The fact that they had few luxuries did not distress her, partly because she had learned that happiness is not dependent upon outward circumstance, and partly because California was full of people who had come there on account of some invalid in the family and who lived simply, on limited means.

All this time, she wrote more or less, for her own amusement, with no idea of publication. About 1888, a friend who owned a newspaper in Oakland asked her to do the musical criticisms for it. Cameron said it was a paper without much influence, but she wished to do well whatever she attempted, and realizing that she knew very little about vocal technique, she entered the studio of Francis Stuart to gain a knowledge of singing through hearing him teach, while she played accompaniments for his pupils. Her musical criticisms were so acceptable to the editor that he sometimes appealed to her, in emergencies, to help out in other departments. Thus she occasionally reported lectures, wrote book reviews and an editorial, always anonymously and as a diversion. By this time, she was also relatively well established as an accompanist and played often in concert. She was also a member of various musical organizations in San Francisco and Oakland, and was for several years president and accompanist of the Hughes Club, of Oakland, at that time the largest women's choral club west of the Mississippi River.

=== Literature ===
In 1898, Cameron stopped teaching music, though she continued her work as an accompanist for two or three years, and having been actively employed for a long time, she was unhappy without a definite occupation. Then, at a studio supper, she met William C. Morrow, formerly a newspaper man, and the author of some extraordinary short stories. He was about to start a class in "The Art of Writing for Publication", covering all branches of newspaper and fiction writing. Very conscious of the limitations of her education, this impressed her as an opportunity to learn more than her scanty schooling had taught her about the technical side of literature, and with that object in view, she helped organize a class in Oakland and became one of the pupils. Morrow contrived to convey a practical knowledge of how material might be handled, and to point out certain pitfalls along the way of the beginner.

One night, in class, Morrow objected that most of the pupils seemed afraid to use dialogue at critical moments in the development of a story, and demanded that each should write a "curtain raiser", for drill in dialogue. Cameron wrote one, with no idea that it might be used in a play, Some friends of hers insisted upon producing it, and as long as she stayed in California, she kept them supplied with one-act plays for amateur production. All these were subsequently published and widely used. A year after beginning her study with Morrow, Harper's Magazine accepted one of Cameron's stories, and from that time, she became a more or less regular contributor to its pages.

On September 16, 1903, she married Harrison Cass Lewis (1863–1926), who was the general manager and vice-president of the National Paper & Type Company, exporting printer's materials to Latin American countries. He had been a playmate of her childhood in Illinois, but after going to California, she had seen nothing of him until she went as a delegate from a San Francisco Club to the World's Columbian Exposition in Chicago, in 1893, where she met him again.

Mr. Lewis’ business took him often into Latin America, and sometimes Mrs. Lewis accompanied him. A circuit of South America in 1908, resulted in The Involuntary Chaperon (1909), written in the form of letters. Several visits to Mexico, between 1905 and 1909, gave her material for The Pretender Person (1911), which was illustrated with photographs. Two or three trips to Europe, including on in 1906, and many across the U.S. did not appear in her fiction. The Golden Rule Dollivers (1913) is the story of new owners of automobiles.

Not driven to work by financial pressure, her writing was an avocation, but she published occasional books and frequent short stories until 1912, including Tangles (1912), a collection of short stories. In that same year, though, the Mexican Revolution brought keen business anxieties to her husband. This, followed by the World War, created a hiatus in Mrs. Lewis’ writing, for she found the kind of fiction she had always written unthinkable during these crises. She said she did not feel humorous, and she refused to inflict upon a suffering world anything that reflected the way she did feel.

Then, in 1918, after a long silence, came The Seven Purposes, causing readers to gasp. It was a book on psychic phenomena by a humorist, who disliked being called a 'spiritualist'. It was a clear, straightforward report of actual occurrences, published somewhat reluctantly and only because the obligation of service, the necessity of sharing this experience with those whom it might help, outweighed with the writer any personal shrinking from possible ridicule. The Seven Purposes was probably the work by which she was best known. It tells the story of the beginning of her own experiences with psychic phenomena. This book almost immediately was a best seller and exerted a wide influence. Both her publishers and her public were surprised by this departure from her accustomed writing, but no one else was as profoundly astonished as she was herself by what she had to report, for she had no tendency toward mysticism and no inclination to speculate about things unseen.

== Personal life ==
In June 1929, she married Maxwell A. Kilvert. He won the Miguel de Cervantes Prize in 1947, a week before his wife died.

Margaret Cameron died at her home in Winter Park, Florida, February 4, 1947.

== Selected works ==
Miss Doulton's Orchids

=== Plays ===
- A Pipe of Peace, a comedy in one act, 1910 (text)
- A Christmas Chime, a play in one act, 1910 (text)
- Miss Doulton's Orchids, a comedy in two acts, 1910 (text)

=== Novels ===
- Comedies in Miniature, 1903 (text)
- The Cat and the Canary, 1908 (text)
- The Bachelor and the Baby, 1908 (text)
- The Teeth of the Gift Horse, 1909 (text)
- The Involuntary Chaperon, 1909 (text)
- The Pretender Person, 1911 (text)
- Round about the Seashore, 1912
- The Golden Rule Dollivers, 1913 (text)
- Johndover, 1924 (text)
- A Sporting Chance, 1926 (text)

=== Mysticism ===
- The Seven Purposes: An Experience in Psychic Phenomena, 1918 (text)
- Twelve Lessons from The Seven Purposes, 1919 (text)

=== Short story collections ===
- Tangles: Tales of Some Droll Predicaments, 1912 (text)
