= Right Book Club =

Defunct English book club

The Right Book Club was an English book club founded in 1937 by Christina and William Foyle to counter the influential Left Book Club, established in 1936 by Victor Gollancz.

== Origins and character ==
In May 1936, the Left Book Club had been established, and towards the end of 1936 a group of “neo-Tories” mooted the idea of a right-wing book club. Christina Foyle and her father William Foyle undertook to organize it, and the Club was launched at a luncheon at the Grosvenor House Hotel in April 1937, with John Baird, 1st Viscount Stonehaven, the recently retired chairman of the Conservative Party, presiding.

The Right Book Club published one book every month, occasionally acting as the first publisher, but more often reprinting a recent new title from a mainstream publisher. Its members received a monthly magazine, and meetings with authors were also held. Membership was free, and members committed themselves to buying the monthly book, which cost 2s 6d (half a crown). The first book appeared in June 1937.

Arthur Bryant saw the Right Book Club as too radical. He responded by founding a similar monthly book club, the National Book Association, where he intended to be more moderate, and Stanley Baldwin agreed to be its President. However, in January 1939 Bryant's association published an expurgated translation of Hitler's Mein Kampf. Baldwin resigned in protest, and this proved to be the last book the NBA published.

By 1939, the Right Book Club claimed 20,000 subscribers, in comparison with some 50,000 members of the Left Book Club and 5,000 of the National Book Association. On 3 November 1939, the humorist A. G. Macdonell replied to an invitation from Christina Foyle to join the Club, "I had no idea that there were twenty thousand members of the Right in politics who could read."

Whereas all volumes of the Left Book Club had the same appearance, a soft binding coloured solid orange, with plain black lettering, the Right Book Club described its books as "on good quality paper, with attractive STIFF binding and dignified coloured jacket". A commentator has said that this was a subtly English way to distance the two clubs: "The bindings are as stiff as a colonel's upper lip, not limp as a lounge lizard's handshake."

In 2022, the critic Clive Bloom claimed that the Right Book Club was "thought up by Sir Oswald Mosley to promote fascism", without providing any source for this claim.

== Endorsements ==
In the club's early days, three notable figures gave endorsements of it.

In a posthumous message written shortly before his death, Austen Chamberlain, a former Conservative Party leader, commented "I welcome the appearance of the 'Right' Book Club. I have learned to trust the judgment of our people when the truth is made available to them."

George Lloyd, 1st Baron Lloyd, a Conservative on the "Diehard" wing of the party, said "I am glad to learn of the popularity and progress of the 'Right' Book Club. A great responsibility as well as an opportunity of doing work of last national importance lies before the Club."

Lord Sempill, a well-known aviator, said "The work which you are doing deserves the support of all thinking men and women."

== Selection committee ==
A committee aimed to select one book per month for publication and consisted of Anthony Ludovici, Norman Thwaites, Trevor Blakemore, Collinson Owen, and W. A. Foyle.

== Principal authors ==
The writers of more than one book published by the Right Book Club were:

- Bernard Newman, four books
- Quentin Reynolds, three books
- Siegfried Sassoon, three books
- Edvard Beneš, three books
- W. H. Chamberlin, two books
- Ivor Halstead, two books
- Douglas Jerrold, two books
- Viscount Lymington, two books
- Charles Petrie, two books
- George Sava, two books
- Clarence K. Streit, two books
- Arnold Wilson, two books
- Gerald Kersh, three books
- Henry Williamson, two books

Other authors included Fred Beal, Clare Hollingworth, Hesketh Pearson, Ian Hay, Hugh Kingsmill, Edward Shanks, James Bridie, Arnold Lunn, Aubrey Jones, R. Welldon Finn, C. E. Vulliamy, Mairin Mitchell, and Harley Williams.

== Patrons ==
The published list of the club’s patrons included:

- Sir Harry Brittain, KBE CMG LL.D
- Sir Frederic Kenyon GBE KCB
- Sir Ernest J. P. Benn, Bt. CBE
- Sir Lawrence Wensley Chubb
- Sir J. Langdon Bonython KCMG
- The Rt. Hon. L. S. Amery MP
- Col. the Rt. Hon. John Gretton MP
- John E. Crowder MP
- Major Francis Yeats-Brown DFC
- Vice-Admiral E. A. Taylor CMG CVO MP
- Hamilton Kerr MP
- Air Vice-Marshal J. E. Baldwin DSO OBE
- Rear-Admiral T. P. H. Beamish CP DL MP
- Sir C. M. Barclay-Harvey MP
- Lt.-Com. Peter Agnew RN MP
- Sir Reginald Dorman Smith MP
- A. Lennox-Boyd MP
- Lt.-Col. Sir T. C. Moore CBE MP
- Charles Taylor MP
- Richard K. Law MP
- Brig. Gen. R. J. Kentish CMG DSO
- Herbert Wragg MP
- Gordon C. Touche MP
- The Hon. W. W. Astor MP
- A. Beverley Baxter MP
- Duncan Sandys MP
- Maxwell Fyfe MP
- E. H. Keeling MC MP
- Eric Errington MP
- Major Ralph Rayner MBE FRGS MP
- E. L. Fleming KC MP

== Publications ==
=== 1937 ===
- Rex Welldon Finn, The English Heritage (June 1937)
- Laurence Housman, Victoria Regina (July 1937)
- W. H. Chamberlin, A False Utopia (August 1937), an inside picture of Communism and Fascism.
- C. J. M. Alport, Kingdoms in Partnership (September 1937), the story of the Imperial Commonwealth.
- G. Ward Price, I Know These Dictators (October 1937), a "close up" of Hitler and Mussolini.
- Harold Cardozo, The March of a Nation: My Year of Spain's Civil War (November 1937), an account of the Spanish War by an English war correspondent
- Douglas Jerrold, Georgian Adventure (December 1937), an autobiography by the Catholic publisher
- Sir Charles Petrie, Lords of the Inland Sea: A Study of the Mediterranean Powers (1937)
- Andrew Smith, I Was A Soviet Worker (1937)

=== 1938 ===
- Fred E. Beal, Word from Nowhere (January 1938), a disillusioned American communist bears witness to labour conditions and to famine in the Soviet Union.
- Sir Charles Petrie, The Chamberlain Tradition (February 1938) about Joseph, Austen, and Neville Chamberlain
- W. H. Chamberlin, Japan Over Asia (March 1938), an interpretation of Japan's foreign policy
- Viscount Lymington, Famine in England (April 1938), the case for a constructive social policy on health and well-being
- William Teeling, Why Britain Prospers (May 1938), a study of current political and economic conditions
- Sir Arnold Wilson, Thoughts and Talks (June 1938), thoughts of a Member of Parliament
- W. S. Shears, This England (July 1938), a guide to rural England
- Eugene Lyons, Assignment in Utopia (August 1938), a critique of the Soviet Union
- Sir Philip Gibbs, Ordeal in England (September 1938), a commentary on current events
- Prince Christopher of Greece, Memoirs by H.R.H. Prince Christopher of Greece (October 1938)
- A. J. Mackenzie, Propaganda Boom (November 1938) a study of propaganda in totalitarian states
- William Foss and Cecil Gerahty, Spanish Arena (December 1938), an account of the Spanish Civil War

=== 1939 ===
- Arnold Wilson Walks and Talks Abroad in 1934–36 (1939)
- Count Pückler, translated from the German by Edward Fitzgerald, How Strong is Britain? (1939)
- Edith Sitwell, Victoria of England (July 1939)
- Arnold Lunn, Revolutionary Socialism in Theory and Practice (1939)
- R. O. G. Urch, The Rabbit King of Russia (1939)
- Hugh Kingsmill, The English Genius (1939)
- Sir Philip Gibbs, Across the Frontiers (1939)

=== 1940 ===
- "Watchman" (Vyvyan Adams), Right Honourable Gentlemen (1940)
- Edvard Benes, Democracy: Today and tomorrow (1940)
- Bernard Newman, The Secrets of German Espionage (1940)
- A. G. Street, A Year of My Life (1940)
- W. G. Krivitsky, I Was Stalin's Agent (1940)
- Vladimir Unishevsky, translated by Violet M. Macdonald, Red Pilot: Memoirs of a Soviet Airman (1940)

=== 1941 ===
- Edward Shanks, Rudyard Kipling: A Study in Literature and Political Ideas (1941)
- Ralph Ingersoll, Report on England (1941)
- L. De Jong, Holland Fights the Nazis (1941)
- Eugene Lyons, Stalin, Czar of all the Russias (1941)
- Ivor Halstead, Wings of Victory: a tribute to the R.A.F. (1941)
- Clarence K. Streit, Union Now With Britain (1941)
- Stephen Leacock, Our British empire: its structure, its history, its strength (1941)
- André Simone, J'Accuse! The Men Who Betrayed France (1941)
- Robert Sencourt, Winston Churchill (1941)

=== 1942 ===
- Edward Ardizzone, Baggage to the Enemy (1942), experiences in France and Belgium, illustrated by the author
- Mairin Mitchell, Back to England: an Account of the Author's Travels on the Continent from 1937 to 1939 and Her Observations on Wartime Conditions in Britain in 1940 (1942)
- Gerald Kersh, They Die With Their Boots Clean (1942)
- Laurence Housman, Gracious Majesty, 1942
- Ivor Halstead, Heroes of the Atlantic: a tribute to the Merchant Navy (1942)
- Storm Jameson, The Fort (1942)
- Hermann Rauschning, Make and Break with the Nazis (1942)
- L. De Jong, Holland Fights the Nazis (1942)
- Adam Mickiewicz, My Name is Million (1942)
- Quentin Reynolds, Don't Think it Hasn't Been Fun (1942)
- E. S. Bates, Soviet Asia: Progress and Problems (1942)
- Strategicus, From Tobruk to Smolensk (1942)

=== 1943 ===
- Francis Yeats-Brown, Indian Pageant (1943)
- Gerald Kersh, The Nine Lives of Bill Nelson (1943)
- Alicia Street, USA, at Work and Play: Depicting the Outlook and Life of the American People (1943)
- Antoine de Saint-Exupéry, Flight to Arras (1943)
- Siegfried Sassoon, The Weald of Youth (1943)
- H. A. Sargeaunt, Geoffrey West, Grand Strategy (1943)

=== 1944 ===
- Robert Henriques, Captain Smith and Company (1944)
- Ian Hay, The Unconquered Isle: Malta G. C. (1944)
- Gerald Kersh, The Dead Look On (1944)
- Bernard Newman, The New Europe (1944)
- Eric Gill, Autobiography (1944)

=== 1945 ===
- Sir George Arthur, Concerning Queen Victoria and Her Son (1945)
- Noël Coward, Middle East Diary (1945)
- Viscount Lymington, Alternative to Death: the Relationship between Soil, Family, and Community (1945)
- E. Amy Buller, Darkness Over Germany (1945)
- Quentin Reynolds, The Curtain Rises (1945)

=== 1946 ===
- Henry Longhurst, I Wouldn't Have Missed It (1946)
- Douglas Dixon, Adventure is Never Done (1946)
- Alexander Woollcott, Long, Long Ago (1946)
- Herbert Hodge, A Cockney on Main Street (1946)
- Henry Williamson, The Sun in the Sands (1946)
- F. E. Baily, The Perfect Age (1946), about Victorian England
- Lin Yutang, Between Tears and Laughter (1946)
- W. L. White, Report on the Russians (1946)
- Robert Henrey, The Siege of London (1946)

=== 1947 ===
- Robert S. Arbib Jr., Here we are together: the notebook of an American Soldier in Britain (1947)
- Aubrey Jones, The Pendulum of Politics (1947)
- Clifton Reynolds, Autobiography (1947)
- Siegfried Sassoon, Siegfried's journey, 1916-1920 (1947)
- Henry Williamson, Life in a Devon Village (1947)
- George Sava, They Come By Appointment (1947)

=== 1948 ===
- George Millar, My Past Was an Evil River (1948)
- C. E. Vulliamy, Ursa Major: a study of Dr. Johnson and his friends (1948)
- John Fischer, The Scared Men in the Kremlin (1948)
- Hector Chevigny, My Eyes Have a Cold Nose (1948)

=== 1949 ===
- Hartley Kemball Cook, Over the Hills and Far Away (1949)
- Charlotte Haldane, Truth Will Out (1949, autobiography)
- Hesketh Pearson, Talking of Dick Whittington (1949)
- Harley Williams, The Healing Touch (January 1949), ASIN B0007IZUXM
- Godfrey Winn, The Bend of the River: a journey in ten stages (1949)
- Harold Russell, Victory in My Hands (1949)

=== 1950 ===
- Beverley Nichols, All I Could Never Be (1950)
- Viscount Grey of Fallodon, The Charm of Birds (1950)
- A. J. P. Taylor, From Napoleon to Stalin: Comments on European History (1950)
- Emma Smith, The Far Cry (1950)

=== Undated ===
- John Fothergill, An Innkeeper's Diary (undated)
- Kenneth Walker, A Doctor Digresses (c. 1951)
