= Charles Henry Foyle =

English businessman (1878–1948)

- Born: 1878
- Died: 1948 (aged 69–70)
- Occupation: Businessman

Charles Henry Foyle (18 March 1878 – 9 December 1948) was an English businessman who invented the folding carton. He founded Boxfoldia in Birmingham in 1920, a company that was finally sold in 2003.

In 1940, he put £7,000 (equivalent to £339,000 in 2025) into a trust for general charitable objectives, including medical and educational facilities and housing for the working classes. Trustees were drawn from the City Council, the University of Birmingham and from the founder's family, and additional advisors were nominated from the company. The trust had an annual income of £5,500 by 1952 (equivalent to £137,800 in 2025). The C. H. Foyle Trust later adapted its memorandum to support educational, recreational and artistic activities of a charitable nature, with an emphasis on those from deprived areas in the West Midlands, with an income of £148,683 in 2008 (equivalent to £242,387 in 2025). Over its seventy years, the Trust supported many individuals and schools and hundreds of charitable organisations, in both educational and other fields, with grants ranging from a few tens to many thousands of pounds. Major beneficiaries have included the Midlands Arts Centre, the Bramall Music Building at the University of Birmingham, the Birmingham Museum and Arts Gallery for the Staffordshire Hoard, and Selly Oak Hospital for the Uli Nimptsch statue, Compassion.

Charles Henry Foyle was born in Hoxton, London. His brothers William and Gilbert Foyle founded Foyles bookshop in London. He privately published Alice Through The Paper-Mill, an Alice in Wonderland-inspired satire on war-time paper control regulations with 12 illustrations by Arthur Wragg.
