= Foyles Building =

Former building in London, England

Coordinates: 51.51478°N 0.13004°W

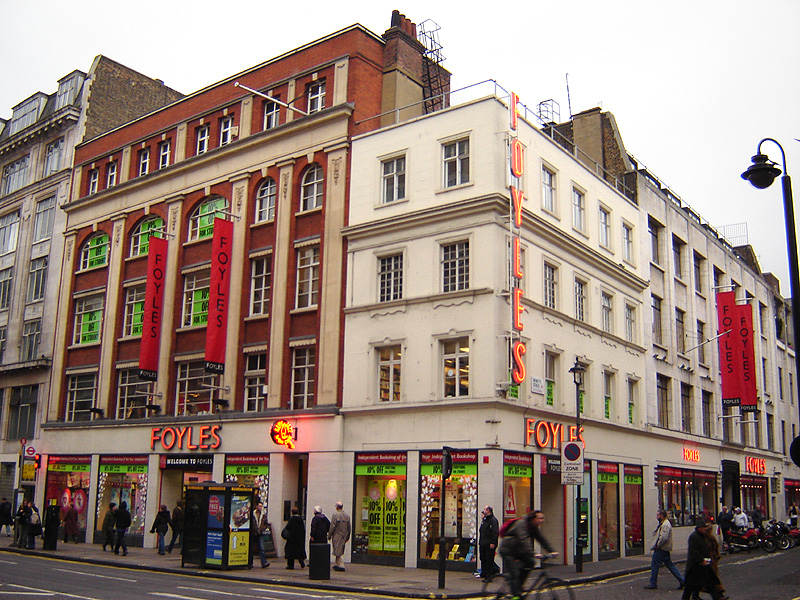
The Foyles Building, 2006

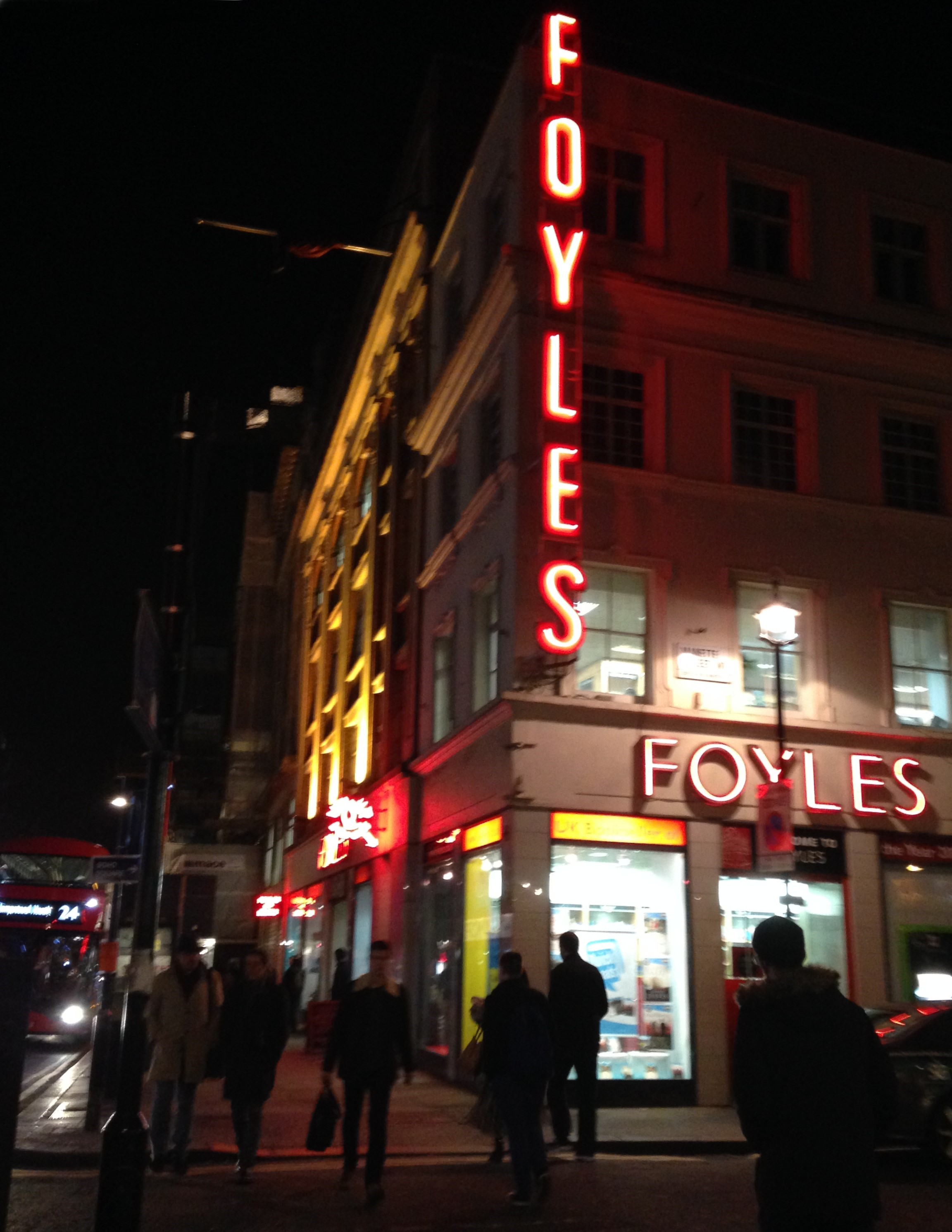
At night

The Foyles Building at 111–119 Charing Cross Road and 1–12 Manette Street, London, was the flagship store of the Foyles bookshop chain from 1929 to 2014, and at one time, the world's largest bookshop. The business moved next door to 107–109 Charing Cross Road in 2014, in a redevelopment of the old Saint Martin's School of Art building. The building was demolished in 2017.

== History ==
The building was designed by the architects F. Taperell and H. Haase and built from 1927 before opening in 1929. It was at one time claimed to be the world's largest bookshop. William Foyle stated that it was "the world's first purpose-built bookshop" (although this is disputed), as well as the world's largest.

In 1932, on hearing that the Nazis were burning books, William Foyle sent Adolf Hitler a telegram asking if he could buy them instead.

During the Second World War, to safeguard the store from the effects of the Blitz, sandbags filled with old books were used, and the roof was "covered" with copies of Hitler's Mein Kampf. In an account in The Argonaut, "News reels this week are showing a clerk of Foyle's of London stacking copies of Adolf Hitler's Mein Kampf in place of sand bags on the roof of the store as a protection against air raids!"

In 1940, a bomb which landed in Charing Cross Road itself nearly destroyed the bookshop, and a bridge was built over the large crater, christened "Foyles Bridge" by William Foyle.

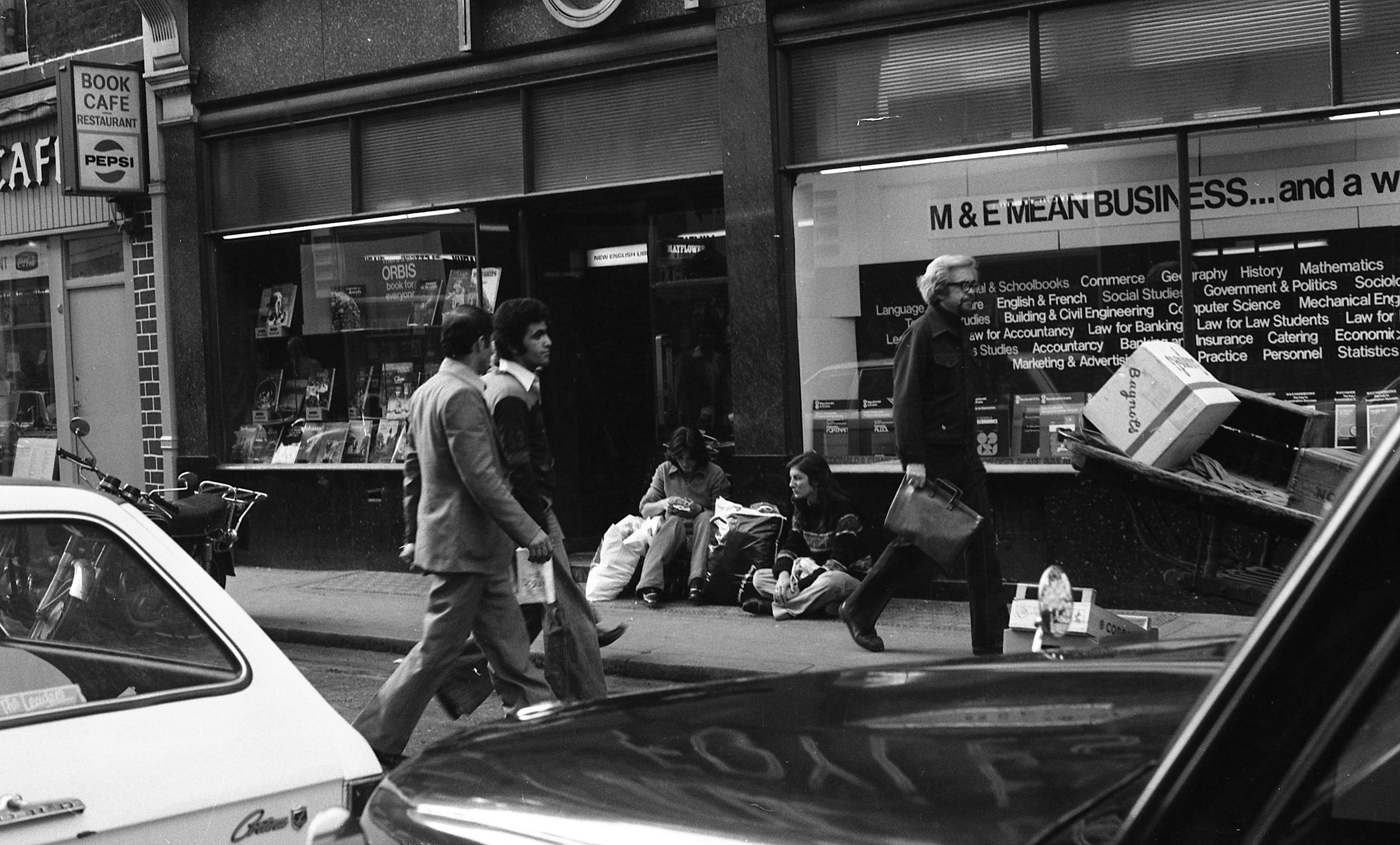
Entrance to the Foyles Building on Manette Street, 1976

In 2014, the business, still family-owned, moved down the road to 107–109 Charing Cross Road, in a redevelopment of the old Central Saint Martins art school building.

== Demolition ==
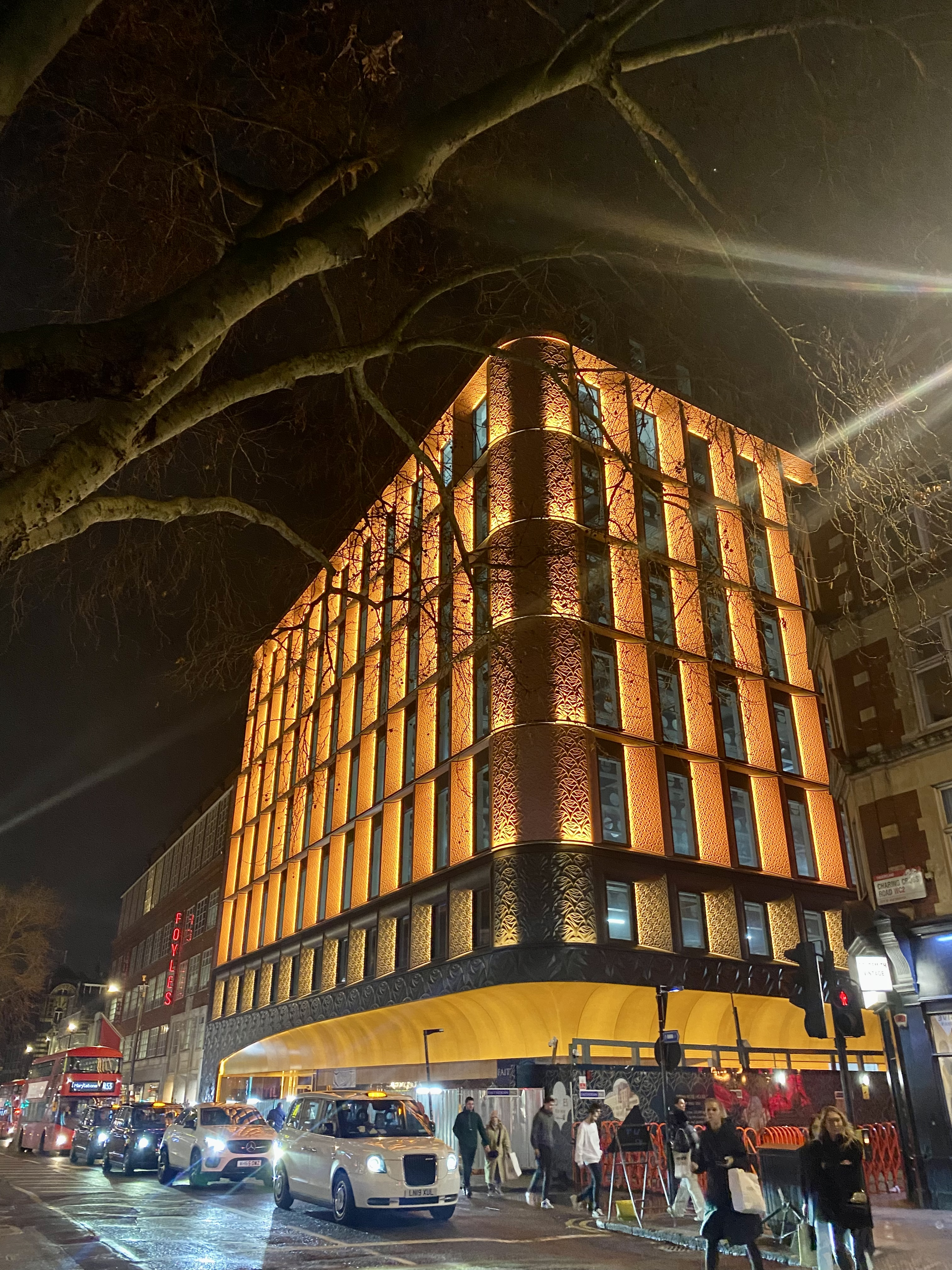
Ilona Rose House in January 2022

The building, owned by Soho Estates, was due to be demolished in autumn 2016, and replaced by a new 310,000 sq ft, 13-storey (including four basement floors) building, Ilona Rose House. Historic England, the Victorian Society, and SAVE Britain's Heritage asked the mayor of London, Sadiq Khan, to reject the planned demolition. The building was demolished in 2017.
