= Christina Foyle =

English bookseller (1911–1999)

- Born: 30 January 1911; London, England
- Died: 8 June 1999 (aged 88)
- Occupation: Foyles bookshop owner

Christina Agnes Lilian Foyle (30 January 1911 – 8 June 1999) was an English bookseller and owner of Foyles bookshop.

== Early life ==
Miss Foyle (as she liked to be called) was born in London, the daughter of William Foyle, a leading bookseller, owner of Foyles, on the Charing Cross Road in the West End of London. The shop had been established in 1904 by William and his brother Gilbert Foyle. Another brother was Charles Henry Foyle, inventor of the "folding carton" and founder of Boxfoldia.

At the age of seventeen, after leaving a Swiss finishing school, Christina Foyle started working at her father's bookshop, and never left. She was the only one of Foyle’s three children who made a career in the business.

In 1930, when she was nineteen, Foyle created the world's first public literary luncheon, bringing together notable writers and other distinguished figures, to meet members of the public. The idea came to her from talking to Kipling, Shaw, H. G. Wells, and other writers while they were buying books, and thinking that others might enjoy such a chance. It also followed on from the literary lectures, without food or drink, started by her father, which were less successful.

On one occasion, Foyle recommended The Forsyte Saga to an elderly customer who was looking for something to read on the train. He bought a copy, but returned it to her a short time later inscribed with the words "For the young lady who liked my book – John Galsworthy."

== Career ==
For almost seventy years Christina Foyle presided over the Foyles literary luncheons. They usually took place at the Dorchester or the Grosvenor House Hotel, and usually a guest speaker (who included Bertrand Russell and Margaret Thatcher) spoke in praise of a book, as well as the author.

In May 1936, the Left Book Club was established, and about the end of 1936 a group of “neo-Tories” proposed the creation of a right-wing book club. William and Christina Foyle undertook to organize it, and the Right Book Club was launched at a luncheon at the Grosvenor House Hotel in April 1937, with Lord Stonehaven, the recently retired chairman of the Conservative Party, presiding. The Right Book Club republished titles with conservative and classical liberal themes.

In 1945, control of the shop passed to Christina Foyle. It was under her that the shop stagnated, with little investment and poorly paid staff who could be fired on a whim. She resisted unionisation of bookshop staff, sacking most employees just before they had worked there six months, when they would gain limited job protection rights. She refused to install electronic tills or calculators, and orders would not be taken by phone. The shop would, however, order expensive books from as far off as Germany without prepayment.

The shop operated a payment system that required customers to queue three times: to collect an invoice for a book, to pay the invoice, then to collect the book: because sales staff were not allowed to handle cash. There was a shelving arrangement that categorised books by publisher, rather than by topic or author. A quote of this period is: "Imagine Kafka had gone into the book trade." In the 1980s a rival bookshop placed an advertisement in a bus shelter opposite Foyles: "Foyled again? Try Dillons".

Foyle met many leading literary and political figures during her life. Her collection of personal correspondence included a letter from Adolf Hitler, responding to her complaint about Nazi book-burning. Her literary friends included Kingsley Amis, Charles de Gaulle, D. H. Lawrence, Yehudi Menuhin, J. B. Priestley, George Bernard Shaw, Margaret Thatcher, Evelyn Waugh and H. G. Wells.

== The Foyle Foundation ==
The Foyle Foundation was founded in 2001 under the terms of Christina Foyle's will. It makes grants to other UK charities, mainly in the fields of the arts and learning (until 2009, also health). The 2010 accounts showed funds of over £76 million. Among other grants it made a large donation to the appeal to purchase the oldest intact European book, the St Cuthbert Gospel, for the British Library in 2011/12. To the year ending June 2010 £41.4 million worth of grants had been offered by the Foyle Foundation.

The Foyle Foundation was established in 2000 as an independent grant making trust to distribute grants to U.K. based charities (primarily arts and learning) and schools.

The Foundation’s long planned spend down and closure took place in December 2025. Over this time, it distributed over £185M in total to almost 7,500 charities and state schools across the U.K. This included 14 legacy projects with long term strategic benefit.

== In popular culture ==
Screenwriter Anthony Horowitz has said that she was the namesake for the title character, Christopher Foyle, in the ITV series Foyle's War.

== See also ==
- Beeleigh Abbey, Christina Foyles former residence
