= Alicia Street =

American schoolteacher, editor, author, and lecturer

Leola Alicia Katherine Street (13 November 1911 – 20 April 2016), née Kumpula, and known as Alicia Street, was an American schoolteacher, editor, author, and lecturer who spent most of her life living in England.

== Early life ==
Street was the daughter of Oscar Francis Kumpula, an American who had been born in Finland, and his wife Mary Johanna Bylkas, of Wakefield, Michigan. She grew up there.

== Career ==
In January 1938, Kumpula (as she then was) was a schoolteacher. She married an Englishman the same year.

Becoming a member of the British American Society, during the Second World War Street took on the role of editor of The Outpost, a newsletter published by Americans living in Britain to tell people in the United States about wartime conditions and "to promote full understanding among the English Speaking Peoples". In 1940, she crossed the Atlantic to visit New York City. In 1941, back in England, Street became chairman of Books Across the Sea, a project founded by the typographer Beatrice Warde to facilitate the exchange of single and multiple copies of British and American books.

Soon after American entry into the war in December 1941, Street published U.S.A. at Work and Play, which aimed to brief the British on their new allies. In 1943 this was republished as a book of the month by Christina Foyle's Right Book Club.

On a sea voyage from New York to England in May 1945, Street was travelling from Wakefield, Michigan, and gave her occupation as a lecturer for the London Committee for the education of the British armed services.

== Private life ==
In December 1937, while she was at home in Michigan, Alicia Kumpula's parents announced her forthcoming marriage in England. She travelled by sea to London on the ship American Farmer, arriving on 24 January, and on 19 February 1938, at St Katherine's church, Merstham, Surrey, married John Hugh Street. Her husband was a civil servant at the Home Office. In 1939, they were living at High Pines, Bishop's Walk, Croydon. In September 1948, Alicia Street returned to Britain from New York on the Cunard Line's MV Britannic, travelling with her two-year-old daughter Leola, and stated their address as 103 St Mary Abbots Court, West Kensington, London W14, and her occupation as "Editor". On a similar journey in 1952, on the SS America, she had with her another daughter, Martha, aged two.

Street's husband rose to become Under-Secretary of the Ministry of Housing and Local Government. In the 1965 New Year Honours, he was appointed as a Companion of the Order of the Bath. He died on 30 December 1977 in Cricklewood, London NW2. Alicia Street survived him for nearly forty years, dying at Coombe Dingle in Gloucestershire, England, in April 2016, aged 104. She was buried at East Dean, East Sussex.

== Selected publications ==
- U.S.A. at Work and Play: Depicting the Outlook and Life of the American People (London: Cassell, 1942)
- The Land of the English People (Philadelphia and New York: J. B. Lippincott Co., 1946)
- "How England Became English", in Matilda Bailey, Ullin W. Leavell, Literature Around the World (1963)
