= Harold Cardozo =

British journalist (1888–1963)

- Born: Harold Gordon Cardozo; 1888
- Died: 1963 (aged 74–75)
- Employer: Daily Mail
- Known for: Coverage of the Spanish Civil War

Harold Gordon Cardozo (1888–1963) was an English journalist, soldier, war correspondent, and author.

During the First World War, Cardozo enlisted as a private into the Rifle Brigade and on 26 June 1917 was commissioned as a Second Lieutenant into the Royal Irish Rifles. In November 1921 he was serving as a temporary Lieutenant in the Royal Ulster Rifles and was made up to Lieutenant.

Cardozo’s main career was as a Daily Mail correspondent. He covered the Spanish Civil War for the newspaper, and George Orwell commented on his reports “ the Daily Mail, amid the cheers of the Catholic clergy, was able to represent Franco as a patriot delivering his country from hordes of fiendish Reds”. In his book March of a Nation (1937), Cardozo told the story of the war from a point of view supportive of Franco. This was chosen as the Right Book Club’s book of the month for November 1937.

In 1940, Cardozo was the first British journalist allowed to enter France after its capitulation to Germany and reported for the Mail from Vichy, quickly publishing a new book, France in Chains, to describe the situation of France. He stated that France had no freedom left and looked forward to Britain returning France to “her former sovereign power”.

== Books ==
- March of a Nation: My Year of Spain's Civil War (London: Eyre & Spottiswoode, 1937)
- France in Chains (London: Hutchinson, 1940)
