= Zero (1928 film) =

1928 British film by Jack Raymond

- Directed by: Jack Raymond
- Written by: Lydia Hayward
- Based on: the novel Zero by H. Collinson Owen
- Produced by: James B. Sloan
- Starring: Stewart Rome; Fay Compton; Jeanne De Casalis; Sam Livesey
- Production company: Film Manufacturing Company
- Distributed by: First National-Pathé Pictures
- Release date: 1928
- Running time: 8,159 feet
- Country: United Kingdom
- Languages: Silent; English intertitles

Zero is a 1928 British silent drama film directed by Jack Raymond and starring Stewart Rome, Fay Compton and Jeanne De Casalis. Based on the 1927 novel by H. Collinson Owen, it was made at Cricklewood Studios.

== Premise ==
A writer fakes his own death and establishes a new identity in order to live with his mistress, but he returns to his wife when she becomes ill.

== Cast ==
- Stewart Rome as John Garth
- Fay Compton as Mrs Garth
- Jeanne De Casalis as Julia Norton
- Sam Livesey as Monty Sterling
- Dorinea Shirley as Veronica Sterling
- Joseph R. Tozer as Major Potterton
- Lewis Shaw as Victor Garth

== Bibliography ==
- Low, Rachael. History of the British Film, 1918–1929. George Allen & Unwin, 1971.
