= Margaret Potter =

British writer (1926–1998)

- Born: Margaret Edith Newman; 21 June 1926; Harrow, Middlesex, England
- Died: 26 August 1998 (aged 72); Oxford, Oxfordshire, England
- Occupations: Teacher, editor, novelist
- Spouse: Jeremy Potter (1922–97)
- Children: 2
- Relatives: Bernard Newman (father)
- Writing career
- Pen name: Margaret Newman, Anne Betteridge, Margaret Potter, Anne Melville
- Language: English
- Period: 1959–98
- Genres: Romance, mystery, children's, family sagas
- Notable awards: RNA Award

Margaret Potter, née Margaret Newman, (21 June 1926 – 26 August 1998) was a British writer of over 55 Romance, mystery and children's novels and family sagas, as well as many short stories. She wrote under her maiden and married names, and also under the pseudonyms of Anne Betteridge and Anne Melville. In 1967, her novel The Truth Game won the Romantic Novel of the Year Award from the Romantic Novelists' Association.

She was the daughter of Bernard Newman and wife of Jeremy Potter, both also published writers.

== Biography ==
=== Personal life ===
Born Margaret Edith Newman on 21 June 1926 in Harrow, Middlesex, UK, she was the eldest daughter of Marjory Edith (Donald), a former teacher, and Bernard Newman, author of fiction and non-fiction books, traveller, lecturer and an authority on spies. She had two sisters, Hilary (Mrs. Richard Hipkin) and Lauriston (Mrs. Malcolm Norris).

She was educated at Harrow County School for Girls, from 1937 to 1944. She then won a scholarship to St Hugh's College, Oxford, and studied Modern History there from 1944 to 1947.

On 11 February 1950, she married (Ronald) Jeremy Potter, a publisher, published writer of mystery and historical novels, and later Over-60s World Champion at Real Tennis. They had a daughter, Jocelyn, and a son, Jonathan.

Widowed since 15 November 1997, she died less than a year later on 26 August 1998 in Oxford, Oxfordshire.

=== Career and works ===
As well as writing, she worked as a teacher in Egypt and England, from 1947 to 1950; as editor at King's Messenger children's magazine in London, from 1950 to 1955; and as adviser at the Citizen's Advice Bureau in Twickenham, Middlesex, from 1962 to 1970.

She earned her first money as a writer writing poems and serials for The Children's Digest in the late 1930s. In 1959, she published her first mystery novel, Murder to Music, as Margaret Newman. Her next novels were published under the pseudonym of Anne Betteridge, a tribute to her father's pseudonym, Don Betteridge. Under her married name, Margaret Potter, she published children's fiction, usually focusing on a young central character who was sometimes unwise and often naughty, but who always made the effort to be sensible. After 1977 she wrote historical novels under the pseudonym Anne Melville, including the Lorimer saga. Her last novel, Debutante, was published after her death, and many earlier works have since been republished.

== Bibliography ==
=== As Margaret Newman ===
==== Single novel ====
- Murder to Music (1959)

=== As Anne Betteridge ===
==== Single novels ====
- The Foreign Girl (1960)
- The Young Widow (1961)
- Spring in Morocco (1962)
- The Long Dance of Love (1963)
- Return to Delphi (1964)
- The Younger Sister (1964)
- Single to New York (1965)
- The Chains of Love (1965)
- A Portuguese Affair (1966)
- The Truth Game (1966)
- A Little Bit of Luck (1967)
- Shooting Star (1968)
- Love in a Rainy Country (1969)
- Sirocco (1970)
- The Girl Outside (1971)
- Journey from a Foreign Land (1972)
- The Sacrifice (1973)
- The Time of Their Lives (1974)
- Stranger on the Beach (1974)
- The Temp (1976)
- The Tiger and the Goat (1977)
- A Place for Everyone (1977)

=== As Margaret Potter ===
==== Single novels for children ====
- The Touch-and-Go Year (1968)
- The Blow-and-Grow Year (1970)
- Sandy's Safari (1971)
- The Story of the Stolen Necklace (1974)
- Trouble on a Sunday (1974)
- The Motorway Mob (1976)
- Tony's Special Place (1977)
- The Boys Who Disappeared (1985)
- Tilly and the Princess (1987)

==== Single novels for adults ====
- Unto the Fourth Generation (1986)
- Lochandar (1988)

=== As Anne Melville ===
==== Lorimer Family ====
1. The Lorimer Line (1977)
2. The Lorimer Legacy (1979) aka Alexa (US title)
3. Lorimers at War (1980) aka Blaize (US title)
4. Lorimers in Love (1981) aka Family Fortunes (US title)
5. The Last of the Lorimers (1983)
6. Lorimer Loyalties (1984)

==== Hardie Family ====
1. The House of Hardie (1987)
2. Grace Hardie (1988)
3. The Hardie Inheritance (1990)

==== Single novels ====
- The Dangerfield Diaries (1989)
- The Tantivy Trust (1992)
- A Clean Break (1993)
- The Russian Tiara (1994)
- Standing Alone (1995)
- The Longest Silence (1996)
- Role Play (1996)
- The Eyes of the World (1998)
- Debutante (1999)

==== Short story collections ====
- Snapshots (1989)
- Just What I Wanted (1997)

==== Non-fiction ====
- Consequences: The Making of a Story-teller (1994)
