= Bernard Newman (writer) =

British writer

Bernard Charles Newman
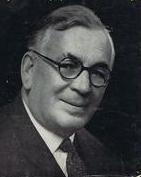
- Born: Bernard Charles Newman; 8 May 1897; Ibstock, Leicestershire, England, United Kingdom
- Died: 19 February 1968 (aged 70)
- Occupation: novelist
- Spouse(s): Marjorie Edith Donald (1912–1993); Helen Johnston (1966–1968)
- Children: 3
- Relatives: George Eliot (great aunt)
- Writing career
- Pen name: Bernard Newman, Don Betteridge
- Language: English
- Period: 1930–1968
- Genres: mystery, children's

Bernard Charles Newman (8 May 1897 – 19 February 1968) was a British writer of 138 books, both fiction and non-fiction. His works have been translated into over 20 languages including Japanese and Braille. A historian, he was considered an authority on spies, but also wrote books concerning travel and politics. His fiction included mystery novels, plays, science fiction and children's books.

He was a great-nephew of the 19th-century author George Eliot, and the father of the romance writer Margaret Potter, who was married to writer Jeremy Potter.

== Personal life ==
Newman was born on 8 May 1897 in Ibstock, Leicestershire, England, one of six children of Annie (Garner) and William Betteridge Newman, a cattle dealer and farmer. He was a great-nephew of the 19th-century author George Eliot.

On 23 August 1923 he married Marjorie Edith Donald, a former teacher. They had three daughters Margaret Edith, Hilary, and Lauriston. On 20 July 1966, he married for the second time with Helen Johnston.

He died in Harrow, London, on 19 February 1968.

== Career and works ==
Newman served in combat during World War I, with reasonable fluency in French. His regiment's French liaison officer occasionally used him to go undercover in Paris. Accompanied by a female French agent, he investigated casual talk by Allied soldiers about troop movements. It was here that his interest in espionage began, and his character 'Papa Pontivy' was based on the French liaison officer.

He ended the war as a staff sergeant, although in a lecture during 1942, he was introduced as a captain. Afterwards, having lost his desire for further education, he obtained a modest job as a civil servant with the Ministry of Works. He began writing and became a lecturer and passionate traveller, visiting more than 60 countries during the interbellum, many of those on a bike. He gave some 2,000 lectures between 1928 and 1940 throughout Europe, even meeting Adolf Hitler. He started writing novels, gaining some recognition with his 1930 novel The Cavalry Went Through.

From 1936 to 1938, he was the first chairman of the Society of Civil & Public Service Writers.

During the early part of World War II, Newman was in France, witnessing some of the invasion by the Germans. For the next five years, he became a staff lecturer at the Ministry of Information and wrote patriotic British novels like Siegfried Spy and Death to the Fifth Column. The novel Secret Weapon featured Winston Churchill. During 1942, he was sent to Canada and the United States to lecture there on the British and the war. In Washington, he encountered President Franklin Roosevelt and lectured for senators and other major officials. He was also a guest in national and local radio broadcasts throughout the country. Returning to the United Kingdom during late 1942, he reversed his role and lectured throughout the country about America.

Newman was also considered an authority on spies and wrote Epics of Espionage and the novel Spy. His 1945 collection of 31 short stories, Spy Catchers, was praised as one of the best books ever written concerning counterespionage.

Newman's novel, The Flying Saucer, was the first book with the words flying saucer in the title. The theme of the book, to bring peace to the world, centred around an invasion of the UK, the US and Russia by aliens. Boucher and McComas praised Flying Saucer as "good fun" but dismissed its politics as "hardly realistic". His science fiction novel The Blue Ants has been described by professor Paul Brian in his study Nuclear Holocausts: Atomic War in Fiction as an "absurd classic of Sinophobia" and "perhaps the earliest example of a fictional Russo-Chinese nuclear war"

Newman was a chevalier in the Légion d'honneur.

== Allegations of espionage ==
=== World War I ===
Some of his early fiction novels, particularly Spy, were written in the first person with himself as the main character. That has led to allegations that he was a spy. Newman lied about his age to enlist at 17 and clarified in his 1960 autobiography, Speaking From Memory, that his war service was routine and unremarkable and that his novels were publicised in that way to achieve sales at the suggestion of his publisher, Gollancz.

Correspondence between Newman and the military historian B. H. Liddell Hart held in the Liddell Hart Centre for Military Archives at King's College London, confirms Gollancz's marketing tactics by asking Newman to 'disappear' for two weeks during the book's initial presentation to the public.

On its publication, Spy attracted considerable attention in the press. Newman had written the novel in such a way that it appeared to be autobiographical although there were several 'facts' that could easily be checked. Relishing the free publicity, (Spy ran to 18 editions) Newman eventually said in an interview:

I am not a spy, I have never been a spy and I don't suppose I shall ever become one. I have never met the King, the Kaiser, Ludendorff, Hindenberg or Lloyd George. I did not win the DSO nor was I as much as half an inch behind the German lines during the war. I am trying to devise a new kind of thriller. I believe I have succeeded. I quite agree that there are plenty of people who might believe it, but I believe the intelligent reader will treat the book exactly as he would a good detective story.

That statement was widely reported in the press worldwide, but even his 1968 New York Times obituary repeated the fiction. Internet articles can still be found stating his 'espionage activities' as fact.

=== World War II ===
Other allegations of espionage activity relate to his extensive travels in Europe between the wars, including reports that he was the agent who first reported Hitler's V1 rockets. In September 1938, Newman was riding around the Baltic region on a bicycle, researching the book Baltic Roundabout. He strayed into a restricted area on the German island of Rugen and was arrested and escorted from the district. He had noticed large concrete structures, and spoke with local villagers who reported noises resembling an express train.

Reading his findings back in London, the experts concluded that the Germans were experimenting with rockets. This information pre-dates the Oslo Report by a full year, and led to extensive research by Newman. It resulted in a radio script for the BBC program Now it can be told, a novel on the Polish resistance contribution to the war effort They Saved London, and the subsequent film Battle of the V-1. In a reverse compliment and recognition of Newman's work, Poland have named two memorials to the Polish Resistance as "They Saved London".

It is not suggested that Newman was ever employed as a spy, but that he was an enthusiastic amateur who regularly reported back to the British government in London after his travels.

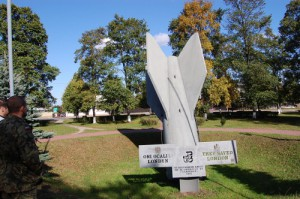
V2 Monument in Sarnaki, Poland

== Bibliography ==
- Character Monologues and How To Perform Them (1926, C. Arthur Pearson)
- Round About Andorra (1928, George, Allen & Unwin)
- The Cavalry Went Through (1930, Victor Gollancz)
- Armoured Doves, A Peace Book (1931, Jarrolds)
- The Fifth Army (1931, Hodder & Stoughton; ghost written by Bernard Newman for General Sir Hubert Gough)
- Hosanna! The Remarkable Novel (1933, Dennis Archer)
- Death in the Valley, a Tale Based On the Origin of the Oberammergau Passion Play (1934, Dennis Archer)
- Death of a Harlot (1934, T. Werner Laurie)
- In the Trail of the Three Musketeers (1934, Herbert Jenkins)
- Anthology of Armageddon (1935, with Idrisyn O. Evans, Dennis Archer)
- Pedalling Poland (1935, Herbert Jenkins)
- Secret Servant (1935, Victor Gollancz)
- Spy (1935, Victor Gollancz)
- The Blue Danube: Black Forest to Black Sea (1935, Herbert Jenkins)
- Albanian Back-door (1936, Herbert Jenkins)
- Cycling in France (Northern) (1936, Herbert Jenkins)
- German Spy (1936, Hillman-Curl)
- The Mussolini Murder Plot (1936, Hutchinson)
- Tunnellers, The Story of the Tunnelling Companies, Royal Engineers, During the World War (1936, with Captain W. Grant Grieve; Herbert Jenkins)
- I Saw Spain (1937, Herbert Jenkins)
- Lady Doctor Woman Spy (1937, Hutchinson)
- Albanian Journey (1938, Sir Isaac Pitman & Sons)
- Danger Spots of Europe (1938, Robert Hale)
- Death Under Gibraltar (1938, Victor Gollancz)
- Ride to Russia (1938, Herbert Jenkins)
- Scotland Yard Alibi (1938, as Don Betteridge, Herbert Jenkins)
- Baltic Roundabout (1939, Herbert Jenkins)
- Cast Iron Alibi (1939, as Don Betteridge, Herbert Jenkins)
- Death to the Spy (1939, Victor Golancz)
- Maginot Line Murder (1939, Victor Golancz)
- 'Siegfried Spy (1939, Victor Golancz)
- Savoy! Corsica! Tunis! Mussolini's Dream Lands (1940, Herbert Jenkins)
- Secrets of German Espionage (1940, Robert Hale)
- The Story of Poland (1940, Hutchinson)
- Death to the Fifth Column (1941, Victor Golancz)
- One Man's Year (1941, Victor Golancz)
- Secret Weapon (1941, Victor Golancz)
- Balkan Spy (1942, as Don Betteridge, Herbert Jenkins)
- Black Market (1942, Victor Golancz)
- The New Europe (1942, Robert Hale)
- American Journey (1943, Robert Hale)
- The Escape of General Gerard (1943, as Don Betteridge, Herbert Jenkins)
- Balkan Background (1944, Robert Hale)
- Second Front - First Spy (1944, Victor Golancz)
- British Journey (1945, Robert Hale)
- Dictator's Destiny (1945, as Don Betteridge, Herbert Jenkins)
- Spy Catchers (1945, collection of 31 short stories, Victor Golancz)
- The Spy in the Brown Derby (1945, Victor Golancz)
- Dead Man Murder (1946, Victor Golancz)
- Russia's Neighbour, the New Poland (1946, Victor Gollancz)
- Middle Eastern Journey (1947, Victor Golancz)
- The Potsdam Murder Plot (1947, as Don Betteridge, Herbert Jenkins)
- The Red Spider Web: The Story of Russian Spying in Canada (1947, Latimer House)
- Baltic Background (1948, Robert Hale)
- Moscow Murder (1948, Victor Golancz)
- News from the East (1948, Victor Golancz)
- The Captured Archives: The Story of the Nazi-Soviet Documents (1948, Herbert Jenkins)
- The Flying Saucer (1948, Victor Gollancz)
- Come Adventuring With Me (1949, Latimer House)
- Mediterranean Background (1949, Robert Hale)
- Shoot! (1949, Victor Golancz)
- The Lazy Meuse (1949, Herbert Jenkins)
- Cup Final Murder (1950, Victor Golancz)
- Epics of Espionage (1950, Werner Laurie)
- Spies Left! (1950, as Don Betteridge, Robert Hale)
- The Sisters Alsace-Lorraine (1950, Herbert Jenkins)
- Centre Court Murder (1951, Victor Golancz)
- Not Single Spies (1951, as Don Betteridge, Victor Gollancz)
- Oberammergau Journey (1951, Herbert Jenkins)
- Turkish Crossroads (1951, Robert Hale)
- Both Sides of the Pyrenees (1952, Herbert Jenkins)
- Death At Lords (1952, Victor Gollancz)
- Soviet Atomic Spies (1952, Robert Hale)
- They Saved London (1952, Werner Laurie; adapted in 1958 as the film Battle of the V.1)
- Tito's Yugoslavia (1952, Robert Hale)
- Morocco Today (1953, Robert Hale)
- Report on Indochina (1953, Robert Hale)
- Ride to Rome (1953, Herbert Jenkins)
- Spy-Counter-Spy (1953, as Don Betteridge, Robert Hale)
- Yours for Action (1953, Civil Service Clerical Association)
- Berlin and Back (1954, Herbert Jenkins)
- Double Menace (1954, Robert Hale)
- The Case of the Berlin Spy (1954, as Don Betteridge, Robert Hale)
- The Sosnowski Affair: Inquest On a Spy (1954, Werner Laurie)
- The Wishful Think (1954, Robert Hale)
- North African Journey (1955, Robert Hale)
- Still Flows the Danube (1955, Herbert Jenkins)
- The Gibraltar Conspiracy (1955, as Don Betteridge, Robert Hale)
- Inquest on Mata Hari (1956, Robert Hale)
- Operation Barbarossa (1956, Robert Hale)
- Real Life Spies (1956, Hutchinson)
- One Hundred Years of Good Company: Published On the Occasion of the Ruston Centenary 1857 – 1957 (1957, Ruston & Hornsby)
- Spain On A Shoestring (1957, Herbert Jenkins)
- The Otan Plot (1957, Robert Hale)
- The Three Germanies (1957, Robert Hale)
- Flowers for the Living (1958, with Guy Bolton, Robert Hale)
- Taken at the Flood (1958, Robert Hale)
- The Spies of Peenemunde (1958, as Don Betteridge, Robert Hale)
- Unknown Germany (1958, Herbert Jenkins)
- Danger Spots of the World (1959, Robert Hale)
- Portrait of Poland (1959, Robert Hale)
- Visa to Russia (1959, Herbert Jenkins)
- Contact Man (1960, as Don Betteridge, Robert Hale)
- Silver Greyhound (1960, Robert Hale)
- Speaking from Memory (1960, Herbert Jenkins; autobiography)
- Unknown Yugoslavia (1960, Herbert Jenkins)
- Bulgarian Background (1961, Robert Hale)
- Far Eastern Journey: Across India and Pakistan to Formosa (1961, Herbert Jenkins)
- Let's Look At Germany (1961, Museum Press)
- Presenting People Living Dangerously (1961, Paul Hamlyn)
- Mr. Kennedy's America (1962, Herbert Jenkins)
- The Blue Ants: The First Authentic Account of the Russian-Chinese War of 1970 (1962, Robert Hale)
- The Package Holiday Spy Case (1962, as Don Betteridge, Robert Hale))
- The World of Espionage (1962, Souvenir Press)
- This Is Your Life (1963, Robert Hale)
- Unknown France (1963, Herbert Jenkins)
- Behind the Berlin Wall (1964, Robert Hale)
- Round the World in Seventy Days (1964, Herbert Jenkins)
- Spies in Britain (1964, Robert Hale)
- The Travelling Executioners (1964, Robert Hale)
- Background to Vietnam (1965, Robert Hale)
- Let's Visit France (1965, Burke Publishing)
- Let's Visit Malaysia and Her Neighbours (1965, Burke Publishing)
- South African Journey (1965, Herbert Jenkins)
- The Spy At No. 10 (1965, Robert Hale)
- Evil Phoenix (1966, Robert Hale)
- Spain Revisited (1966, Herbert Jenkins)
- Draw the Dragon's Teeth (1967, Robert Hale)
- Let's Visit South Africa (1967, Burke Publishing)
- Let's Visit Vietnam (1967, Burke Publishing)
- The Bosworth Story (1967, Herbert Jenkins)
- The Dangerous Age (1967, Robert Hale)
- To Russia and Back (1967, Herbert Jenkins)
- Portrait of the Shires (1968, Robert Hale), Portrait of (book series)
- The Jail Breakers (1968, Robert Hale)
- The New Poland (1968, Robert Hale)
- Turkey and the Turks (1968, Herbert Jenkins)
- Spy and Counter Spy: Bernard Newman's Story of the British Secret Service (1970, Robert Hale)
