= Molly MacArthur =

English artist and stage designer

Florence Mary McArthur
- Born: Florence Mary "Molly" McArthur; 27 October 1893; London, England
- Died: 12 January 1972 (aged 78); Oxford, England
- Spouse: James Sinclair Standish Anderson (m. 1917)
- Writing career
- Pen name: Molly McArthur
- Genres: Illustration, theatrical design

Florence Mary McArthur (27 October 1893 – 12 January 1972), was an English artist and stage designer who also illustrated a number of books. Her work for the stage (always as Molly McArthur) was first seen in 1923, after which she worked in the theatre continuously until 1958.

== Early life ==
She was born Florence Mary McArthur in Chelsea, London, on 27 October 1893, the second child of the Liberal MP William McArthur and Florence Creemer (née Clarke). She trained at the Westminster School of Art and was registered as a student in 1915.

== Creative career ==
McArthur's skill and sensitivity as an artist raised her book illustration beyond the purely decorative, distilling the essence and atmosphere of the texts it accompanied. Her work, often in the form of woodcuts, appeared in books, including:

- Trevor Blakemore, China Clay (W. Heffer & Sons, 1922)
- Florence Mary McArthur, Tribute (Pelican Press, 1925)
- Eleanor Farjeon, Come Christmas (Collins, 1927)
- Helen Simpson, Mumbudget (Heinemann, 1928)
- Ann Driver, Music and Movement (Oxford University Press, 1936)

Her first work for the theatre was seen at the Oxford Playhouse in 1923–24 for J. B. Fagan, and two years later she designed her first London production at the Fortune Theatre, The Cradle Song (1926). In 1931, after Anmer Hall bought the St. James's Picture Theatre in Westminster, she and fellow designer Arnold Dunbar Smith converted it into the Westminster Theatre. There she worked for Tyrone Guthrie: A Pair of Spectacles; The Anatomist; Six Characters in Search of an Author, and The Kingdom of God.

Her later West End credits included: The Green Bay Tree; Hervey House (1935); Call It a Day (1935); Love from a Stranger (1937); Mary Read; The Black Eye; Bitter Harvest; Bonnet Over the Windmill (1937); Busman's Honeymoon; Black Limelight; and Quiet Wedding. Throughout the 1930s, she designed for Tyrone Guthrie at the Old Vic: 1933–34 The Cherry Orchard and The Importance of Being Earnest, 1936–37 Love's Labour's Lost and Twelfth Night and, 1937–38 Pygmalion and The King of Nowhere for Esmé Church. In 1937, she had accepted Esmé Church's invitation to design an 18th-century As You Like It at the Old Vic and New Theatres, "giving the setting for the most memorable Rosalind of Dame Edith Evans" (Marie Ney), and in 1939 designed Viceroy Sarah for the Old Vic's Buxton season. The OUDS also saw her work in John Gielgud's production of Romeo and Juliet (1932) and Twelfth Night, produced by Esmé Church (1937). Other producers with whom she was associated include Basil Dean and Irene Hentschel.

During the war, McArthur served as an air-raid warden. She also did her own work and, after it, designed austerity revues for Laurier Lister. In 1949, she renewed her association with Esmé Church who, in 1944, had accepted the invitation of the Bradford Civic Group to become director of its playhouse in Chapel Street. An important part of Esmé Church's work was founding and nurturing the Northern Children's Theatre, which gave practical training to young actors in the north of England and provided entertainment for children. Robert Stephens and Edward Petherbridge were just two of the actors whose careers started there. Molly McArthur was responsible for the design of virtually all productions during the 12 years of its existence.

== Personal life ==
McArthur married James Sinclair Standish Anderson on 15 February 1917. Her married name has led to some confusion with children's illustrator Florence Mary Anderson (1889–1945), but McArthur always used her maiden name for her professional work.

McArthur died in Oxford on 12 January 1972. Her obituarist in The Stage said of her: "She had a remarkable eye for stage pictures, which made a deep impression on the audience and long haunted the memory of those who saw them."
