= J. Harley Williams =

British physician and novelist

John Hargreaves Harley Williams OBE DPH (19 October 1901 – 12 April 1974), often known as J. Harley Williams, was a British physician, barrister, medical author, and novelist.

== Life ==
Born in Birkenhead, where he went to school, Williams was admitted to the faculty of medicine at the University of Edinburgh aged only sixteen. He became one of the best-known students of the university, excelling as a debater, a pianist, and a writer, and becoming editor of the student magazine.

Williams graduated MBChB in 1923, and then Doctor of Public Health. His direction was set by his admiration for the work on tuberculosis of Sir Robert William Philip, and his first career appointment was as tuberculosis officer and medical officer of health in the Isle of Lewis. He joined the National Association for the Prevention of Tuberculosis (NAPT) in 1927 and became a travelling lecturer. In 1939 he was appointed as the association's Secretary General. This post was transformed into that of Director General of the Chest and Heart Association when the NAPT changed its name.

After the Second World War, Williams wrote many articles and lectured in India and North America. He organized several Commonwealth conferences on tuberculosis and also served as secretary of a government committee which allocated money to patients who needed overseas health care.

Williams published four novels, six biographies, and Requiem for a Great Killer, the story of the fight against tuberculosis. He died in 1974, not long after retiring from his post as Director General of the Chest and Heart Association. He was then living at The Cloisters, London EC4, and left a personal estate valued at £4,470.

== Publications ==
- A Century of Public Health in Britain, 1832–1929 by J. H. Harley Williams, with a foreword by W. W. Jameson (London : A. & C. Black, 1932)
- ”Citizenship and Tuberculosis” in Journal of State Medicine, Vol. 43 (1935), 43–52
- Northern Lights and Western Stars (London: Rich & Cowan, 1939), novel
- Fingal’s Box (London: Jonathan Cape, 1941), novel
- The Healing Touch (Right Book Club, 1949, ASIN B0007IZUXM)
- Between Life and Death (The Scientific Book Club, 1952, ASIN B00LZVOJ2S)
- Masters of Medicine (Pan Books, 1954, ASIN B001O11K5S)
- Requiem for a Great Killer: Story of Tuberculosis (London: Health Horizon, 1973)
- Will to Health (London: Health Horizon, 1967)

== Honours ==
- OBE, 1950 New Year Honours
