= Battle of the V-1 =

1958 film

- Directed by: Vernon Sewell
- Written by: Jack Hanley; Eryk Wlodek; Bernard Newman
- Produced by: George Maynard; John Bash
- Starring: Michael Rennie; Patricia Medina; Milly Vitale; David Knight; Esmond Knight; Christopher Lee
- Cinematography: Basil Emmott
- Edited by: Lito Carruthers
- Music by: Robert Sharples
- Production companies: Eros Films & John Bash Films Corporation
- Distributed by: Eros Films
- Release date: 25 August 1958 (UK)
- Running time: 104 minutes
- Country: United Kingdom
- Language: English

Battle of the V-1 (also known as Battle of the V.1, Battle of the V1, Missiles from Hell and Unseen Heroes) is a 1958 British war film directed by Vernon Sewell and starring Michael Rennie, Patricia Medina, Milly Vitale, David Knight and Christopher Lee. It was written by Jack Hanley, Eryk Wlodek and Bernard Newman based on Newman's 1955 novel They Saved London .

== Plot ==
The film tells the story of a Polish Resistance group, which discovers details of the manufacture of the German V-1 'Flying Bomb' at Peenemünde in 1943. Liaising with service chiefs in London, the group manage to pass on enough information to convince them to launch a bombing raid and, in the climax to the film, are able to steal a V-1 which lands in a field during testing and arrange for its transport back to the United Kingdom.

Messages are got out from the camp via the dentist (at the loss of one tooth). The Poles are warned that a British bombing raid on Peenemünde is imminent and that they should prepare to escape during the raid.

Following their escape, the second part of the film looks at the attempts to find an entire V-1 to send back to Britain. They are eventually rewarded by an unexploded V-1 landing in a field which they quickly conceal from the German search team. Through convoluted means, they send the dismantled weapon back to Britain just before the critical first use of this terrible weapon.

== Cast ==
- Michael Rennie as Stefan
- Patricia Medina as Zofia
- Milly Vitale as Anna
- David Knight as Tadek
- Esmond Knight as Stricker
- Christopher Lee as Brunner
- John G. Heller as Fritz
- Carl Jaffe as General
- Peter Madden as Stanislaw
- George Pravda as Karewski
- Gordon Sterne as Margraaf
- Carl Duering as scientist
- Harold Siddons as Wing Commander Searby – Master Bomber
- George Pastell as Eryk
- Henry Vidon as Konim
- Jan Conrad as Wlodek
- Tom Clegg as Anton
- Geoffrey Chater as Minister of Defence
- Julian Somers as Reichfuhrer
- Gertan Klauber as SS Guard – dentist's surgery (uncredited)
- Richard Pearson as senior RAF Officer (uncredited)
- Frank Thornton as British scientist (uncredited)
- Patrick Waddington as Air Marshal (uncredited)

== Reception ==
=== Box office ===
Sewell said the film "made a fortune".

=== Critical ===
The Monthly Film Bulletin wrote: "This film wavers uneasily between the documentary and the war-adventure. All the stock devices for screwing up tension are used shamelessly and repetitively – handing over information under the nose of German guards, bombs being rendered harmless by amateurs, aeroplanes that refuse to start while enemy patrols creep nearer and nearer... On the other hand the material is taken from actual history, and some of the sequences are authentic German newsreels of V.1 tests. It is a pity that the real heroism and daring of the 'people who stole and smuggled out the bomb are reduced to stripcartoon proportions by writing, direction, and acting of slapdash predictability."

In The Radio Times Guide to Films Allen Eyles gave the film 2/5 stars, writing: "Weakly cast and excessively long ... The low-budget production awkwardly mixes documentary footage from old enemy newsreels with standard underground heroics that were filmed in the Sussex countryside."

In British Sound Films: The Studio Years 1928–1959 David Quinlan rated the film as "average", writing: "True-life war exploits trivialised into conventional action film."

== See also ==
- Home Army and V-1 and V-2
- Operation Most III
