= Frederick W. Whitridge =

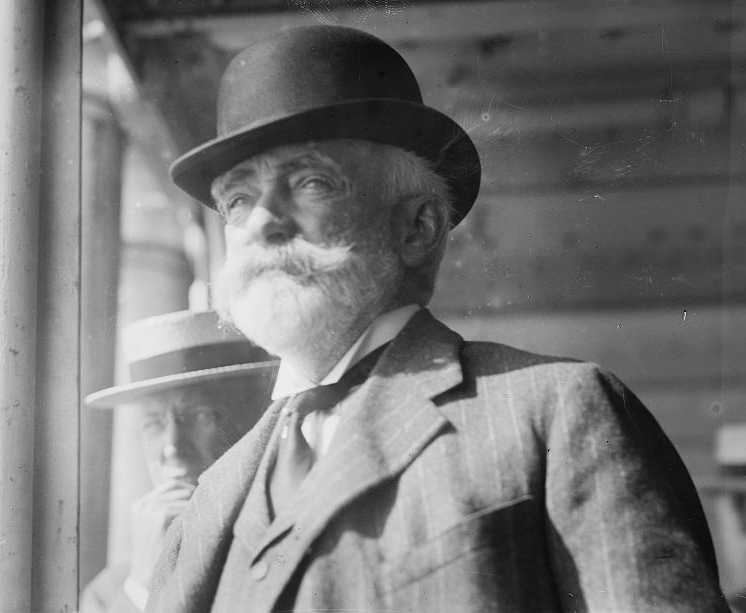
Whitridge circa 1914

Frederick Wallingford Whitridge (August 8, 1852 – December 30, 1916) was an American industrialist who served as president of the Third Avenue Railway Company.

== Biography ==
He was born on August 8, 1852, in New Bedford, Massachusetts, to John C. Whitridge. He married the daughter of Matthew Arnold. He died on December 30, 1916, three days after his appendix operation.

In 1919, Whitridge’s daughter Eleanor Lucia married Lt. Col. Norman Thwaites, Director of the British Mission, New York. and they had two sons and two daughters.
