= Ivor Halstead =

British journalist

Ivor Halstead (11 October 1888 – 7 April 1959) was a British journalist and author, editor of the Daily Sketch.

Born in 1888 at Dewsbury, in the West Riding of Yorkshire, Halstead was one of the sons of William Hartley Halstead and his wife Mary Ellen Scatchard. He was baptised in 1889 in the Wesleyan Methodist Chapel at Eastborough, Dewsbury, together with an older brother, William Edgar, born in 1886. In the 1911 United Kingdom census, the family was at The Woodlands, Ings Road, Dewsbury, and Halstead was listed as a Journalist.

During the First World War, Halstead enlisted in the 2/1st East Riding of Yorkshire Yeomanry, a cavalry regiment, and was disembodied on 28 June 1919, meaning that his unit returned to a part-time status.

By 1926, Halstead had been appointed as editor of the Daily Sketch and was also working with Professor A. M. Low on the script of a film to be called Cosmos, about the history of the world from the beginning of time.

In 1927 Halstead was the initial acting organiser for the founding of the Women's Automobile and Sports Association (WASA), before it was formally constituted by a committee of rich women in 1929.

Halstead's Wings of Victory (1940) was described in a review in December of that year as “the first story of the Battle of Britain to appear in a book”.

In October 1941, a note from Leslie Rowan, Private Secretary to Winston Churchill, informed Churchill that Major W. Turner, assistant director of Public Relations, was asking Churchill to agree to be interviewed by Halstead, who was writing a book on tanks.

A book about the General Post Office, Post Haste, was a war-time best seller and in 1952 was translated into Japanese by G. Miyaki and published in Japan.

Halstead's The Gentle Sex (1943), written with Leslie Howard and Jean Knox, Director of the Auxiliary Territorial Service, was to promote the film of the same name directed by Howard and starring Joan Greenwood.

== Personal life ==
On 30 July 1932, Halstead married Ada Baxter in Wandsworth, and in September 1939 they were living at 66/68 South Side, Clapham Common. He died at 30 Rutland Gardens, Hove, on 7 April 1959.

== Selected publications ==
- Bulletins from Britain (E. P. Dutton and Co., 1940)
- Wings of Victory: a tribute to the R.A.F. (London: Lindsay Drummond, 1940; Right Book Club, 1941)
- Heroes of the Atlantic: the British Merchant Navy carries on (London: Lindsay Drummond, 1941; Right Book Club, 1942)
- The Truth about Our Tanks (London: Lindsay Drummond, 1943)
- The Gentle Sex: the Great Film Story of Life in the A.T.S. (London: Fosh & Cross, 1943), with Leslie Howard and Jean Knox
- Post Haste: The Story of the Post Office in Peace and War (London: Lindsay Drummond, 1944)
- Hansard Digest 1946–1947 (London: Whitehall, 1947)
- The State We Are In (London: Whitehall, 1947)
- Bond Street (London: Barcliff, 1952)
