= Books Across the Sea =

Books Across the Sea was a cultural and literary movement begun in 1940 as the result of the stopping of the transatlantic trade in printed books. At that time there was a ban on the import and export of non-essential goods into Britain to free-up shipping space for more essential goods.

== History ==
Books Across the Sea was founded in 1940 by Beatrice Warde to help offset Nazi propaganda among other expatriate Americans remaining in London after the fall of France. She arranged through her mother May Lamberton Becker, literary editor of the New York Herald Tribune for single copies of 70 new significant American titles to be imported in friends' hand luggage. These were displayed in the offices of the Americans in Britain Outpost of the Committee to Defend America by Aiding the Allies. A similar present of British-published books was sent to America. The books were carefully selected to mirror life in the two countries and included educational titles. Schools assembled and sent scrap books showing the daily life of the children.

It was quickly seen that books were essential good-will ambassadors, and a formal organisation was set up to run it, with branches in Britain (in London and Edinburgh) and America (in New York and Boston), first under the chairmanship of Professor Arthur Newall, and soon after by T. S. Eliot. Another key collaborator was Alicia Street, editor of The Outpost, a newsletter published by Americans living in Britain "to promote full understanding among the English Speaking Peoples". By 1944 some 2,000 volumes had been received in London and 1,600 in New York. The branches also acted as enquiry centres about life in the opposite countries. After the war, in February 1946, the London collection of books was presented to the South Audley Street branch of the City of Westminster Libraries at a ceremony attended by Mrs Eleanor Roosevelt.

Books Across the Sea was formally adopted by the English-Speaking Union in 1947 which still runs it, widening the scope to cover other countries.

== Archives ==
Archive materials related to Books Across the Sea are held in multiple collections. Papers related to the movement, as well as Beatrice Warde's personal and professional papers, are held at the Cadbury Research Library, University of Birmingham. A large collection of books that were exchanged as part of the programme are held at the University of Kent. Other correspondence related to Books Across the Sea is held at the University of Reading.
