= A. J. Mackenzie =

Scottish barrister, soldier, and author

Alexander Johnston Mackenzie (1912 – 7 April 1945) was a Scottish barrister, soldier, and author.

== Life ==
Mackenzie graduated in law from the University of Edinburgh in 1934 and joined Gray's Inn to train as a barrister, succeeding in Bar examinations in the Trinity term of 1936.

Before the Second World War, Mackenzie made a study of propaganda in totalitarian states, and his book Propaganda Boom (1938) was republished in November 1938 by the Right Book Club. In the work he studied in particular the propaganda of the First World War, the contemporary German Ministry of Propaganda and the Italian Ministry of Popular Culture, and the Soviet Union, and the concerns of other countries about excessive government interference in news and culture. He warned that there was fakery in films, both in the entertainment industry and in newsreels and seemingly factual films. However, he also concluded that propaganda would be "the fourth defence service in any future war".

Mackenzie identifies seven requirements for successful propaganda: repetition, colour, kernel of truth, slogans, specific objective, concealed motive, and timing.

In July 1940, Mackenzie was commissioned into the Gordon Highlanders and became Deputy Assistant of Public Relations to the British 21st Army Group. He was killed at Rheine, Westphalia, in the final weeks of fighting in the European theatre of the war, at which time he was an acting major.

== Select publications ==
- Propaganda Boom (London: John Gifford, 1938)
