= Balkan News =

The Balkan News was a daily newspaper produced in Salonika for the British Salonica Force (BSF) fighting on the Macedonian front.

It was first published in November 1915 and the final ‘Adieu’ edition appeared on May 10, 1919. It contained war news from all fronts, mainly based on radio reports. Items relating to the Balkans, Austria and Russia predominated, and were mixed with verse and other writing. There was also local advertising and an “Orient Weekly” column written by editor Harry Collinson Owen under the pseudonym Comitadji.

Initially 4 pages, by mid-1918 the paper had been reduced to 2 pages per issue and contained almost exclusively war news, with a few advertisements. The newspaper was printed on poor quality paper. Copies are now rare, and the runs held by British Library and the Imperial War Museum are incomplete.

== Mentions in memoirs ==
The Balkan News is mentioned frequently in ‘Salonica and After’, which was written by its editor Harry Collinson Owen.

It was described by Cyril Falls in the British Official History of the Macedonia operations, as "one of the best Army newspapers of the days of the war"

The Balkan News was referred to by Alan Palmer in ‘The Gardeners of Salonica’, where he noted that “Even after half a century, its files show the determination and doggedness underlying the mocking self-pity that was as fashionable in Macedonia as it was in the trenches of Belgium and France”

In “The Macedonian Campaign”, Luigi Villari, who was for two years Italian Liaison officer with the various Allied Commands in the East, said that "“The British had only one paper, The Balkan News, edited by Mr. Collinson Owen. It was purely a paper for the army, containing the news of the day and a few special articles, and was well written, bright, full of wholesome cheerfulness and wit, and wholly free from local political tendencies — unlike the French papers, it never tried to create bad feeling between the Allies”.

== Editors ==
Harry Collinson Owen was a professional journalist sent out to Salonika specifically to edit the Balkan News.

Owen Rutter served in Macedonia in the 7th Battalion of the Wiltshire Regiment. After the war he became a prolific writer of travel books, history books and novels

== Tiadatha ==
Owen Rutter used the Balkan News to serialise (under the pseudonym ‘Klip-Klip’) his epic poem ‘Tiadatha’, a parody of Longfellow’s ‘Hiawatha’ that described the trials and tribulations of a young British officer serving in Macedonia. Although written by one of the editors, and much advertised in it, the Balkan News is mentioned only once in the poem, when its 'hero', after being wounded in an assault on the Bulgarian trenches, had a spell in hospital where:

Every morning after breakfast
He would lie back on his pillows,
Read his Balkan News in comfort,
Spend his day in eating, sleeping …….
