= R. Welldon Finn =

English historical writer

Reginald Arthur Welldon Finn (14 March 1901 – 1971) was an English historian whose main interest was in Domesday Book. His work appeared under the names R. W. Finn, R. Welldon Finn, and Rex Welldon Finn.

Born at Sandbach, Cheshire, Finn was the son of Sidney Wallace Finn, of School House, Sandbach, headmaster of Sandbach grammar school, and was educated at Rossall School and Peterhouse, Cambridge, where he held a scholarship in history. He graduated BA in the History Tripos in 1923 and took his MA in 1929. On leaving Cambridge, he joined the publishing firm William Heinemann.

In 1937, Finn's The English Heritage was the first selection of the newly established Right Book Club.

In November 1941, during the Second World War, Finn was commissioned into the Administrative and Special Duties Branch of the Royal Air Force with the rank of Pilot Officer.

A review of Finn's The Norman Conquest and Its Effects on the Economy, 1066–1086 (1971) noted that "Mr Welldon Finn has contributed greatly to Domesday studies in the course of the last generation."

In 1926, at Frome, Finn married Phyllis Ward. In 1939, they were living at Frinton, Essex.

== Publications ==
- R. W. Finn, Cheshire (Alfred A. Knopf, 1928, in series "The Borzoi County Histories")
- R. W. Finn, Wiltshire (Alfred A. Knopf, 1930, in series "The Borzoi County Histories")
- R. Welldon Finn, You Want a Dog? (London, Country Life, 1933)
- R. Welldon Finn, Man and His Conquest of England (London: William Heinemann, 1936)
- Rex Welldon Finn, The English Heritage (London: Heinemann, 1937; Right Book Club, June 1937)
- Rex Welldon Finn, Scottish Heritage (London: Heinemann, 1938)
- R. Welldon Finn, A. J. W. Hill, And So Was England Born (London: Heinemann, 1939)
- Reginald Arthur Welldon Finn, Introducing Ireland (1955)
- Rex Welldon Finn, "The Immediate Sources of the Exchequer Domesday", in Bulletin of the John Rylands Library 40 (1957), 47–78
- Rex Welldon Finn, "The Exeter Domesday and its Construction" in Bulletin of the John Rylands Library 41 (1959), 360–387
- Rex Welldon Finn, The Domesday Inquest and the Making of Domesday Book (London: Longmans, 1961)
- R. Welldon Finn, An Introduction to Domesday Book (London: Longman, 1963)
- Rex Welldon Finn, Domesday Studies: The Liber Exoniensis (London: Longmans, 1964)
- H. C. Darby, R. Welldon Finn, The Domesday Geography of South-West England (Cambridge University Press, 1967, new edition 2009)
- R. Welldon Finn, The Norman Conquest and Its Effects on the Economy, 1066-1086 (Oxford University Press, 1971)
- Reginald Arthur Welldon Finn, The making and limitations of the Yorkshire Domesday (1972)
- R. Welldon Finn, Domesday Book: a guide (London: Phillimore, 1973 ISBN 0-85033-101-3)
