= Foyles =

English bookstore chain

Coordinates: 51.5147°N 0.1301°W

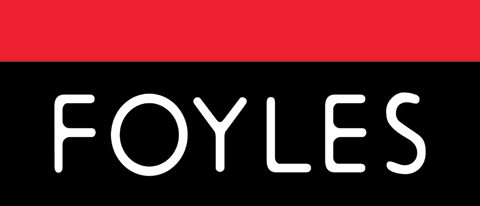

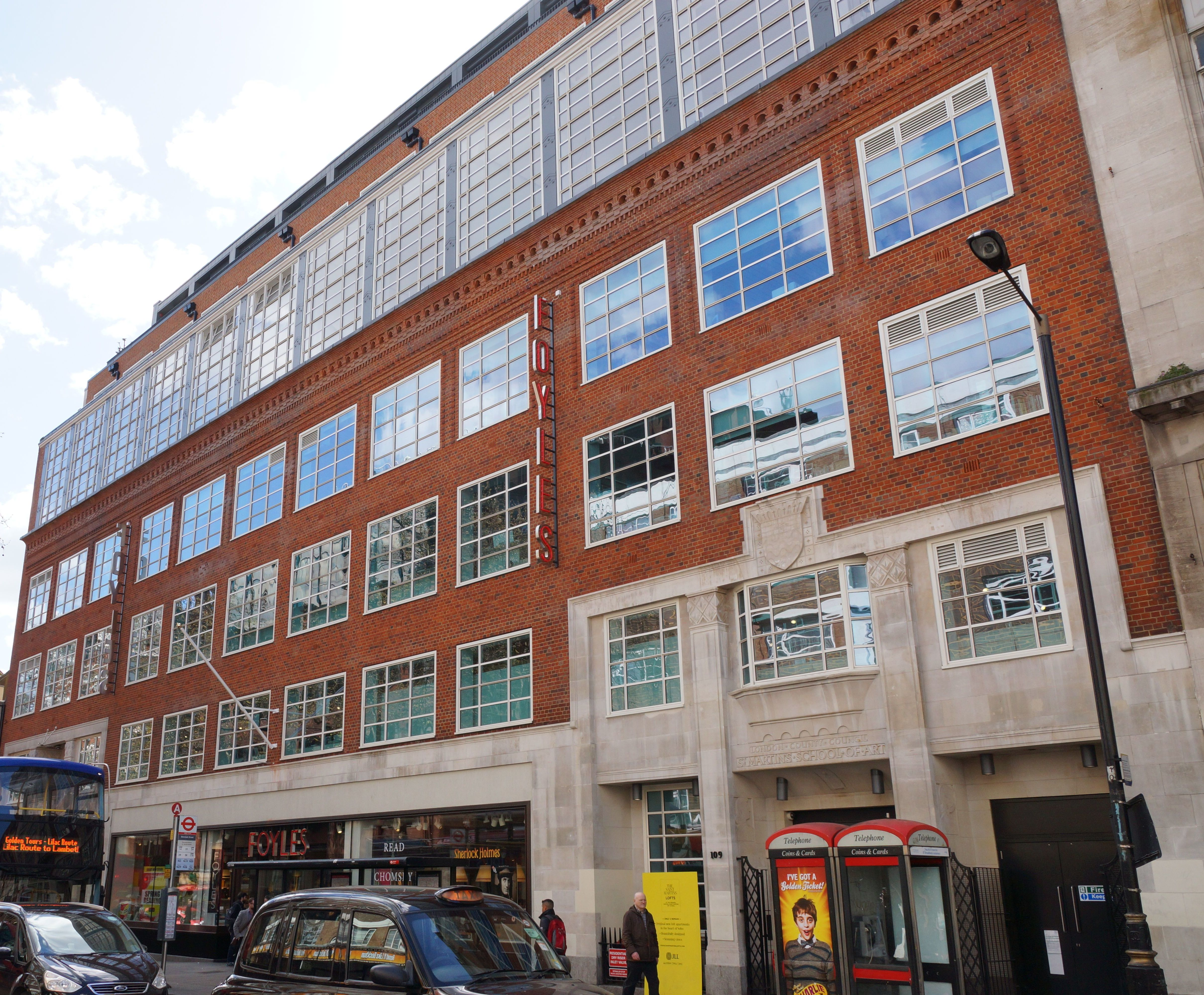
- The flagship Foyles store at 107 Charing Cross Road, London
- Type: Private company
- Industry: Retail
- Founded: 1903
- Founder: William Foyle, Gilbert Foyle
- Headquarters: 107 Charing Cross Road, London
- Key people: William & Gilbert Foyle (founders); Christina Foyle (1945–99); Christopher Foyle (1999–2022)
- Products: Books
- Owner: Christopher Foyle (1999–2018); Waterstones (2018–present)
- Website: http://www.foyles.co.uk

Foyles, established as W & G Foyle Ltd in 1903, is a bookseller with seven stores in England. It is best known for its flagship store in Charing Cross Road, London. Foyles was once listed in the Guinness Book of Records as the world's largest bookshop in terms of shelf length, at 30 miles (48 km), and of titles on display. It was bought by Waterstones in 2018.

Foyles was famed for its anachronistic, eccentric and sometimes infuriating business practices (see below), so much so that it became a tourist attraction. It has since modernised, and has opened several branches and an online store.

== History ==
=== Founding and early branches ===
Brothers William and Gilbert Foyle founded the business in 1903. After failing entrance exams for the civil service, the brothers offered their redundant textbooks for sale and were inundated by offers. This inspired them to launch a second-hand book business from home. Flushed with success, they opened a small shop on Station Parade in Queen's Road, Peckham, where they painted "With all Faith" in gilt letters above the door.

The brothers opened their first West End shop in 1904, at 16 Cecil Court. A year later they hired their first member of staff, who promptly disappeared with the weekly takings. By 1906, their shop was at 135 Charing Cross Road and they were described as London's largest educational booksellers.

By 1910, Foyles had added four suburban branches: at Harringay, Shepherd's Bush, Kilburn and Brixton.

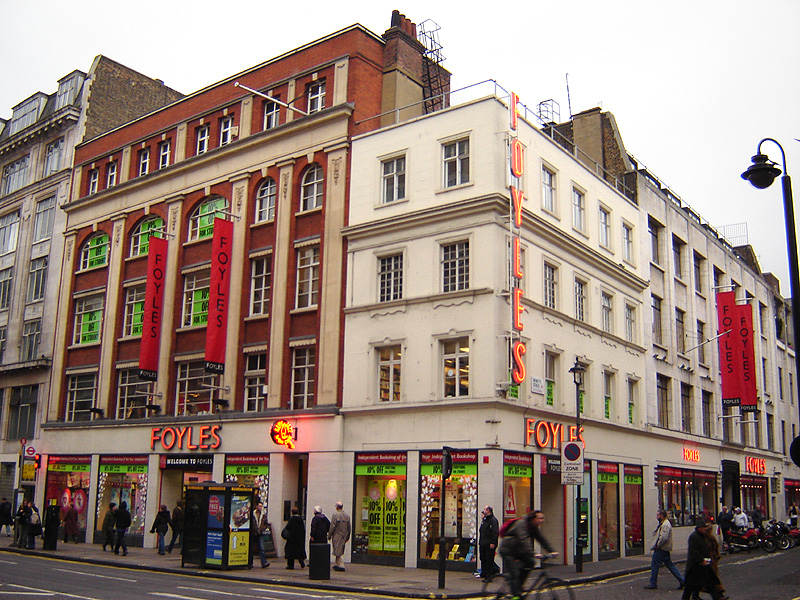
The former Foyles shop at 111–119 Charing Cross Road

Not long afterward, the brothers moved their central London store to 119 Charing Cross Road, the Foyles Building, where it remained until 2014. They acquired adjacent buildings at 1–7 Manette Street including the site of the Old Goldbeater's House. For a time the store included premises at 121–125 Charing Cross Road, on the north side of the junction with Manette Street.

In this period Foyles, like many booksellers, used to stick a small permanent label advertising themselves on every book they sold. According to one such label, at some time Foyles had a branch in South Africa, at 12–14 Church Street, Cape Town.

Foyles published Foylibra: Foyles Bookshop Magazine.

William Foyle sent Adolf Hitler a telegram offering to buy all Jewish books that were to be burnt. Hitler replied: Would no sooner corrupt the morals of the English than the Germans.

=== Christina Foyle's era ===
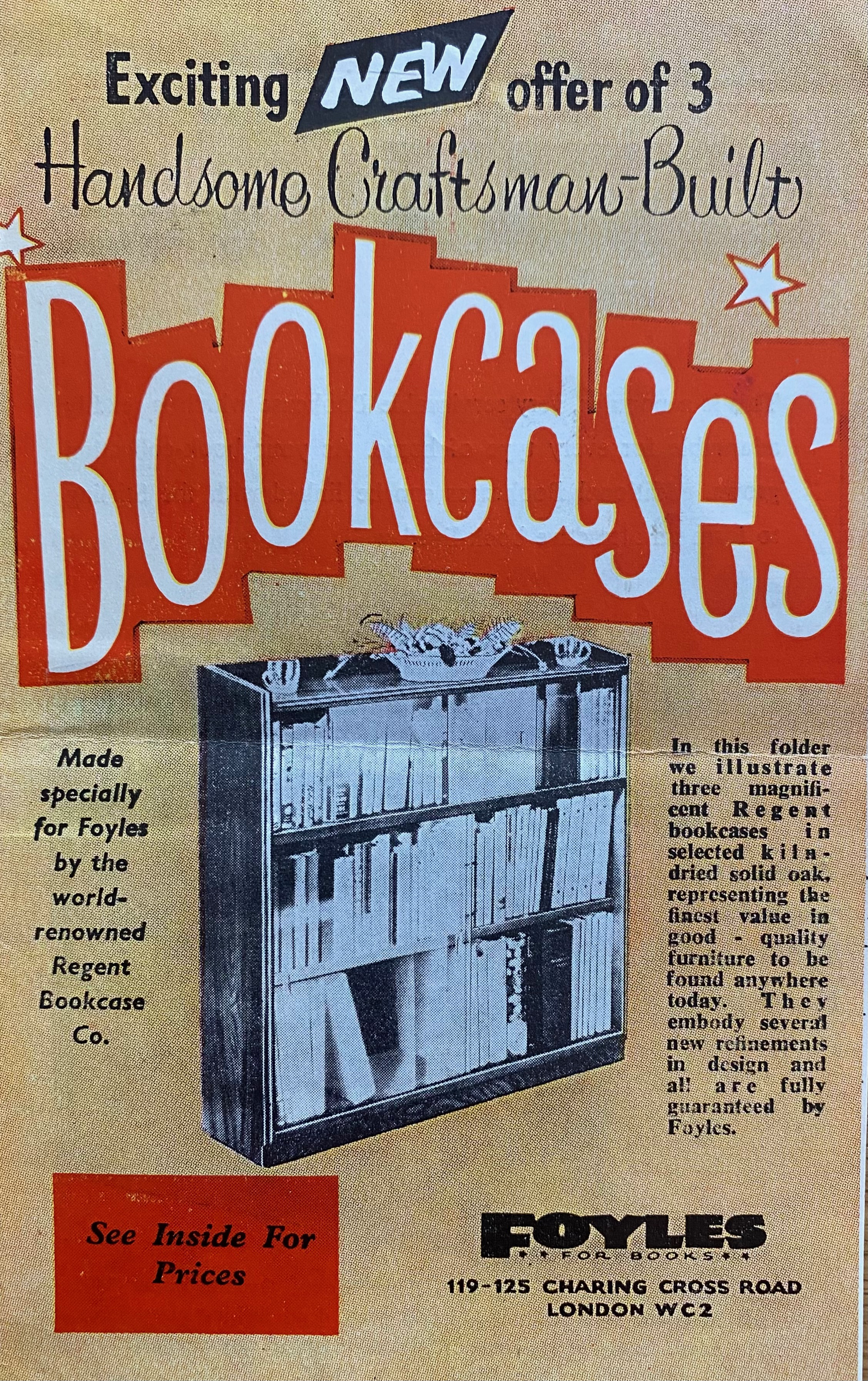
A Foyles advertisement from the 1960s

Christina Foyle, daughter of co-founder William, initiated literary luncheons at the Charing Cross Road premises in October 1930; these continue to 2010. In the first 80 years 700 luncheons were held, hosting more than 1,000 authors and 500,000 guests. Speakers and guests of honour at these luncheons have included great literary figures, and celebrities from the world of politics, the media, the military and the theatre. Most British Prime Ministers since the Second World War have attended, as have The Duke of Edinburgh, General Charles de Gaulle, General Władysław Sikorski and the Emperor of Ethiopia Haile Selassie. The store now also holds many evening literary events throughout the year. In 1939, Christina invited Hitler, Benito Mussolini and Joseph Stalin to speak at a Foyles luncheon. General Pinochet and General Franco were customers.

Control of the shop passed to Christina in 1945. Under her the shop stagnated, with little investment and poorly paid staff who could be fired on a whim. She also refused to install any modern conveniences such as electronic tills or calculators, and she would not allow orders to be taken by phone. The shop excelled in other fields: expensive books ordered from as far off as Germany were sent with a bill without prepayment.

The shop operated a payment system that required customers to queue three times: to collect an invoice for a book, to pay the invoice, then to collect the book, because sales staff were not allowed to handle cash.

Foyles' bizarre payment system required customers to collect a bill from the assistant, take it to a payment booth and then return it to the assistant to collect the books. The theory was that the less people who handled the money, the better.

The shelving arrangement categorised books by publisher, rather than by topic or author. The newspaper The Independent described the atmosphere as "Imagine Kafka had gone into the book trade." In the 1980s, rival bookshop Dillons placed an advertisement in a bus shelter opposite Foyles reading "Foyled again? Try Dillons".

Christina Foyle and her husband, Ronald Batty, were determined to be free to fire workers at will and were fiercely opposed to worker representation.

Time was when staff were regularly dismissed before they'd worked there six months to avoid any staff rights that came into force at that point.

From the Staff Rules in 1985: "Employment is on a weekly basis".

In 1980, British poet Wendy Cope was awarded the first prize in The New Statesman poetry contest for her short poem Foyled, a parody of Edward Thomas' Adlestrop.

Yes, I remember Foyles – too well –
Because, one Saturday in June,
I went to buy some books and stood
The whole confounded afternoon…

=== Modernisation ===
Christina Foyle died in 1999; control then passed to her nephew Christopher, who modernised Foyles' shop and practices. Christopher Foyle was also, from 1978 until 2008, the chairman and CEO of aviation companies Air Foyle and Air Foyle HeavyLift, chairman and later Deputy President of the Air League, and a Trustee of the Foyle Foundation. He is also a Fellow of the Royal Aeronautical Society, a Liveryman of the Guild of Air Pilots and a Deputy Lord Lieutenant for Essex.

Foyles' heavily weathered panelling was replaced by a red plastic, grey metal and beech interior. Whereas the shop used to sell second-hand and new books side by side on the same shelves, it now primarily sells books in print, like other large chain bookshops, but with a notably larger range of titles on every subject. It also now sells second-hand and out-of-print books together with new books in its art, history and archaeology departments. Most of these changes were made between 2003 and 2005. Foyles also now sells electronic books on its website.

=== Acquisitions of other companies ===
The feminist Silver Moon Bookshop was incorporated into Foyles in 2001 after rising rents on its Charing Cross Road premises forced it to close.

In 2011 Foyles took over Grant & Cutler, a foreign language bookseller that had been founded in 1936. In March 2011 Foyles closed Grant & Cutler's shop at 55–57 Great Marlborough Street and merged it with the foreign language section of Foyles' then premises in the Foyles Building. In the new Foyles store at 107 Charing Cross Road, Grant & Cutler is on Level 4.

=== Waterstones acquisition ===
The Foyles bookshops were bought by Waterstones for an undisclosed sum in September 2018. The shops have continued to use the Foyles brand.

== Branches ==
=== Modern branches ===
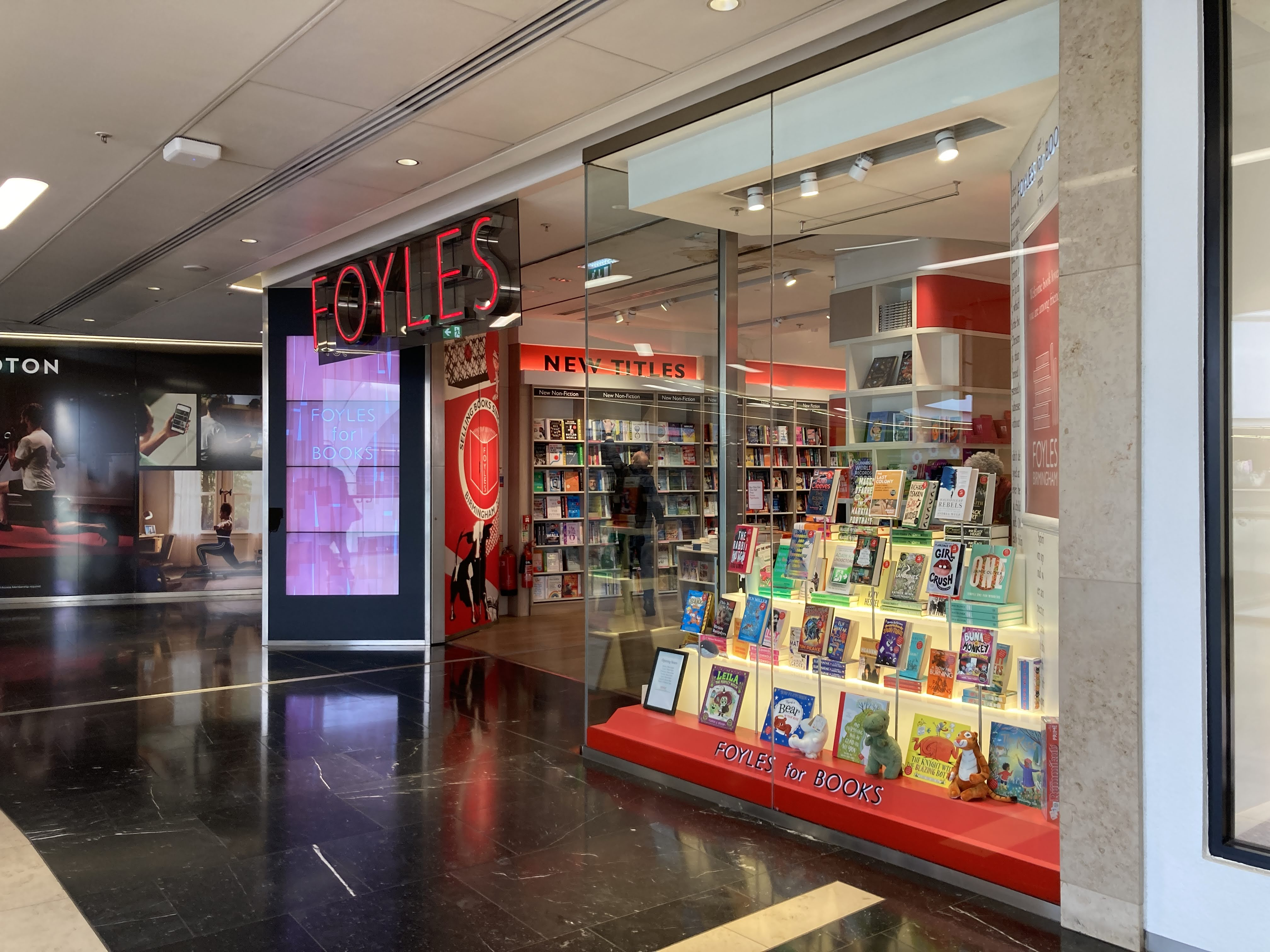
The Foyles store at the Birmingham Grand Central & Bullring mall during 2022

Foyles opened a branch at the Royal Festival Hall on London's South Bank in 2005. The following year the chain was awarded a concession to run the book departments in Selfridges' London Oxford Street and Manchester stores, but these closed in February 2009. In February 2008 it opened the only bookshop in St Pancras railway station, which had been refurbished to include the Eurostar London terminal. Foyles also opened a branch in the Westfield shopping centre, which opened on 30 October 2008 in White City in West London. It opened a new 'Booktique' store at London's One New Change shopping centre in October 2010, but this closed in November 2011.

In March 2011 Foyles opened a store in Bristol, its first out-of-London store since before the Second World War. That October it opened a second Westfield store, designed by Lustedgreen, an interior architectural design consultancy, in the Westfield Stratford City complex next to the Olympic Stadium. The chain opened a bookshop in London Waterloo station in February 2014. Birmingham Grand Central & Bullring also features a Foyles store as of its opening in 2015. In September 2016 Foyles opened a store in the new Chelmsford shopping development.

=== New flagship store ===
In late 2011 Foyles announced that it was selling the lease of its flagship Foyles Building at 111–119 Charing Cross Road. It acquired premises at 107 Charing Cross Road, formerly occupied by the Central St Martins College of Art and Design. The premises were refurbished to designs by London-based architects Lifschutz Davidson Sandilands. The store moved out of the Foyles Building and into the new premises in June 2014.

== Foyles Book of the Year ==
Foyles has chosen three titles each year since 2017 as "Book of the Year": Fiction, Non-fiction and Children's.

== Awards ==
Foyles has earned the following awards:

- 2002 Independent Bookseller of the Year;
- 2005 Academic Bookseller of the Year;
- 2006 London Independent Bookseller of the Year
- 2008 Chain Bookselling Company of the Year, 2008 Bookseller of the Year
- 2010 Bookseller of the Year
- 2012 National Bookseller of the Year and National Children's Bookseller of the Year
- 2013 National Bookseller of the Year

== See also ==
- Books in the United Kingdom
