= May Lamberton Becker =

American literary critic (1873–1958)

May Lamberton Becker (August 26, 1873 – April 27, 1958) was an American journalist and literary critic. She was born in New York and at the age of 20 she married the pianist and composer Gustav L. Becker in 1893. Their only daughter Beatrice was born September 20, 1900. By 1908 the marriage had broken up and later ended in divorce. She died at her daughter's house, in Epsom, Surrey, England, in April 1958, aged 84.

== Career ==
May Lamberton Becker made her name as a literary critic and for more than forty years wrote a weekly 'Readers Guide', first with the New York Evening Post, then with the Saturday Review of Literature and finally in the weekly book section of the New York Herald Tribune, of which she later became literary editor. She was well known as a lecturer on literature and drama. She wrote a number of introductions for the Rainbow Classics series of children's books and after the move of her daughter to England in 1927 she was a frequent visitor and wrote a number of 'Letters from London' for her newspaper. At the end of her life, she was an occasional contributor to The Times Literary Supplement.

Becker was also known as an anthologist, who was responsible for the Golden Tales series (Golden Tales of Our America (1929), Golden Tales of the Old South (1930), Golden Tales of New England (1931), Golden Tales of the Prairie States (1932), Golden Tales of the Far West (1935), Golden Tales of Canada (1938), Golden Tales of the Southwest (1938)), as well as several unrelated collections (Under Twenty (1932), A Treasure Box of Stories for Children (1937), Growing Up With America (1941), The Home Book of Christmas (1941), Youth Replies, I Can: Stories of Resistance (1945), The Home Book of Laughter (1948)). She wrote two biographies for young people, Introducing Charles Dickens (1941) and Presenting Miss Jane Austen (1952), and several books of advice regarding reading (A Reader's Guide Book (1924), Adventures in Reading (1927), Books as Windows (1929), Reading Menus for Young People (1935), First Adventures in Reading (1936, published in England 1937 as Choosing Books for Children), and compiled The Rainbow Mother Goose (1937) and The Rainbow Book of Bible Stories (1948). Five Cats from Siam (1935) and Foreign Cookery (1950) were her other titles.

== Personal life ==
She was very pro-Britain, at a time when America and most Americans were neutral at the start of the Second World War. Her American royalties from Introducing Charles Dickens (written in the first year of the War) paid for the 'Charles Dickens' ambulance for use in London, and her British royalties were spent on welfare projects there.

She was an active participant in Books Across the Sea, of which her daughter was chairman. This was founded in 1942 to import specimen copies of new books from America and export British ones, at a time when the commercial traffic of new books had stopped because of lack of shipping space.

== Legacy ==
In May 1960 T. S. Eliot dedicated the reading room of the National Book League, Albemarle Street, London, to her memory, "in gratitude for her inspiration and friendly guidance". The work was funded and furnished by British and American friends and admirers (though the principal donor was her daughter).
