= Charing Cross Road =

Street in central London

Coordinates: 51°30′42″N 0°07′42″W

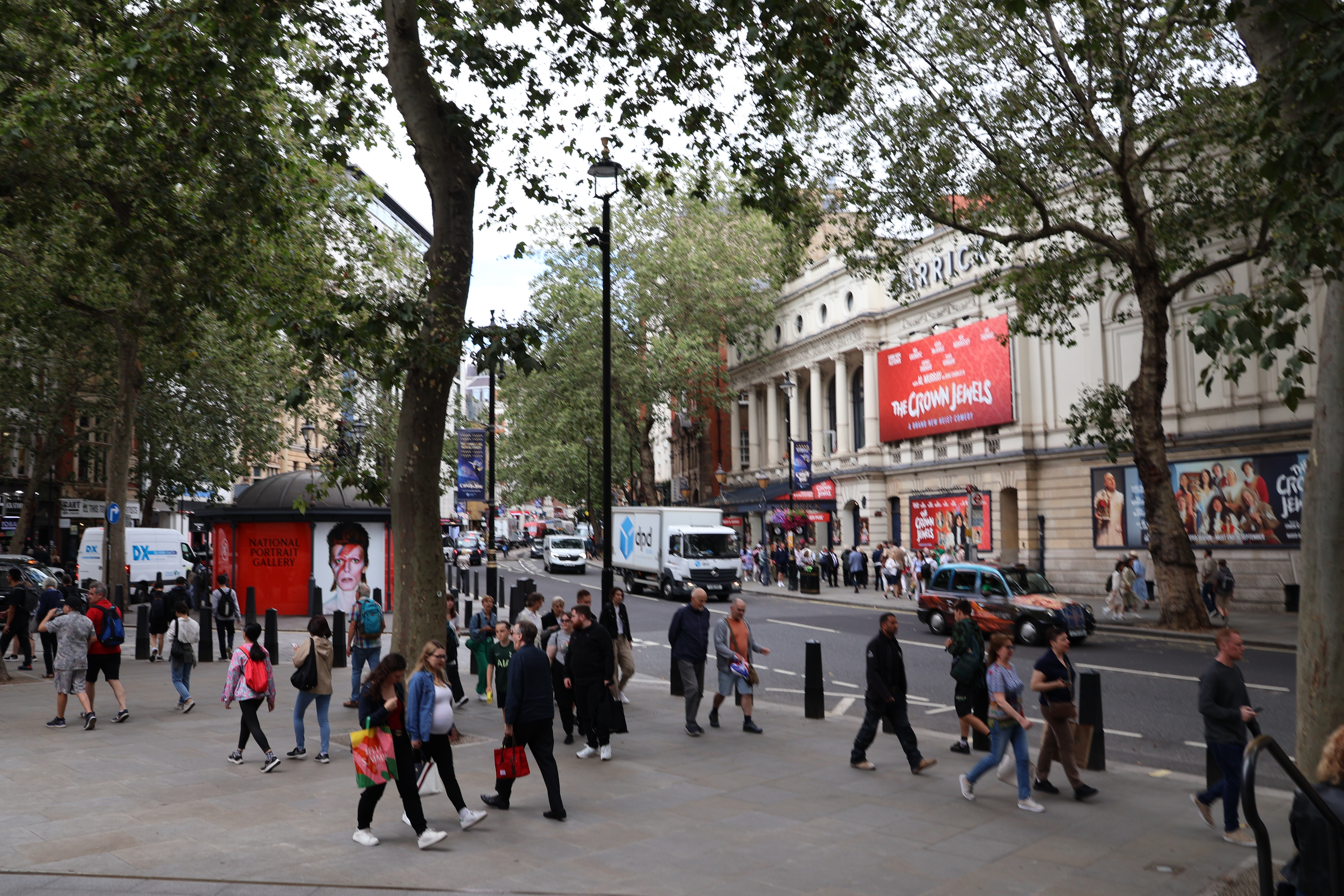
Charing Cross Road, London, looking north from its junction with Irving Street. The Garrick Theatre is on the right.

Charing Cross Road is a street in Central London, running immediately north of St Martin-in-the-Fields to St Giles Circus (the intersection with Oxford Street), which then merges into Tottenham Court Road. It leads from the north in the direction of Charing Cross at the south side of Trafalgar Square. It connects via St Martin's Place and the motorised east side of the square.

== History ==
Charing Cross road was originally two narrow streets in the West End, Crown Street and Castle Street. The development of Regent Street (parallel to the west) in the mid-18th century coincided with not only the building up of great fields west of the area but also Westminster Bridge which was built as central London and the wider estuary's second bridge after more than a century of pressure, in 1750.

These pressures therefore congested the north–south axis of the inner West End almost as much as the relieved London Bridge area. Specifically a major increase in traffic occurred around Piccadilly Circus, Charing Cross and Oxford Street, much of it destined from/to Tottenham Court Road, Bloomsbury and nearby routes to all northerly directions.

Charing Cross Road was therefore developed, in conjunction with Shaftesbury Avenue, by the Metropolitan Board of Works under an 1877 Act of Parliament. The Act's total costs, including demolition and rebuilding of many rows of buildings across London was £778,238. The two streets and others such as the Thames Embankment, Northumberland Avenue and the Kingsway-Aldwych superstructure were built to improve traffic flow through central London. The scheme abolished some of the worst slums in London which delayed progress in construction while the inhabitants were rehoused.

== Bookshops ==
Charing Cross Road is renowned for its specialist and second-hand bookshops. The section from Leicester Square Underground station to Cambridge Circus is home to specialist bookshops, and more general second-hand and antiquarian shops such as Quinto Bookshop, Henry Pordes and Any Amount of Books. Zwemmer's Bookshop, an arts bookshop founded in 1922, was present at 79 Charing Cross Road until 2002. Silver Moon Women's Bookshop was located at 68 Charing Cross Road from 1984 to 2001. Smaller second-hand and specialist antiquarian bookshops can be found on the adjoining Cecil Court.

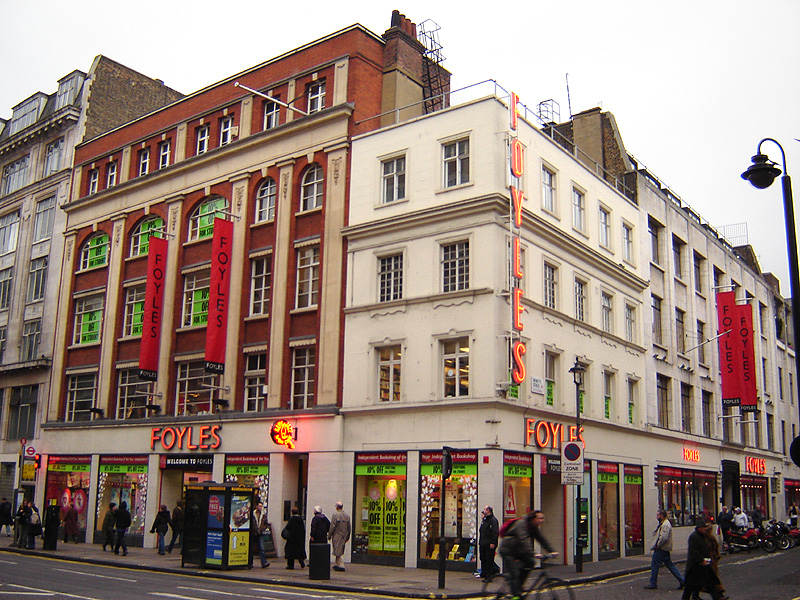
The Foyles Building bookshop on the west side of Charing Cross Road in 2006 (closed 2014)

The northern section between Cambridge Circus and Oxford Street includes more generalist bookshops such as the venerable Foyles. A long-standing correspondence between New York City-based author Helene Hanff and the staff of a bookshop on the street, Marks & Co., was the inspiration for the book 84, Charing Cross Road (1970). The book was made into a 1987 film starring Anne Bancroft and Anthony Hopkins and also into a play and a BBC radio drama. As of 2022 the building is a restaurant at street level, entered around the corner in Cambridge Circus, but its upper levels of the building remain as originally constructed. A brass plaque on the stone pilaster facing Charing Cross Road commemorates the former bookshop and Hanff's book.

== Features ==
The London Astoria music venue was located here before its demolition in 2009, as is one of the sites of St Martin's Arts College, opening in 1939. To the northeast of Charing Cross Road are the music shops on Denmark Street (known as Britain's Tin Pan Alley).

A number of theatres are on or near Charing Cross Road, such as the Phoenix Theatre (which has its entrance on the adjoining Phoenix Street), the Garrick Theatre and Wyndham's Theatre.

Beneath the grille in the traffic island between Charing Cross Road's junction with Old Compton Street, in the middle of the road, a road sign reading Little Compton Street can be seen, which was a historic name for the eastern end of Old Compton Street beyond its junction with Greek Street.

On the east side of the road's southern end, at the joining of St Martins Lane, is a statue of Edith Cavell. Towards the north end is the Phoenix Garden, an environmental garden run by local residents.

== In popular culture ==
In the Harry Potter books, the Leaky Cauldron pub is located on Charing Cross Road. Author J.K. Rowling chose this road because "it is famous for its bookshops, both modern and antiquarian. This is why I wanted it to be the place where those in the know go to enter a different world."
