= Harry Collinson Owen =

British journalist and author

Harry Collinson Owen MBE (1882–1956) was a British journalist and author.

== Background ==
During World War I he edited the British Army newspaper Balkan News, for the Balkan front. He published Salonica and After in 1919, a book containing primary source material. Under the pseudonym Hugh Addison he wrote a science fiction novel, The Battle of London, about a communist take-over. He wrote further novels and non-fiction. His novel Zero was made into a film in 1928.
