= William Foyle =

Co-founder of W. & G. Foyle, booksellers

William Alfred Westropp Foyle
- Born: 4 March 1885
- Died: 4 June 1963 (aged 78); Maldon, Essex, England
- Resting place: Highgate Cemetery
- Occupation: Bookseller

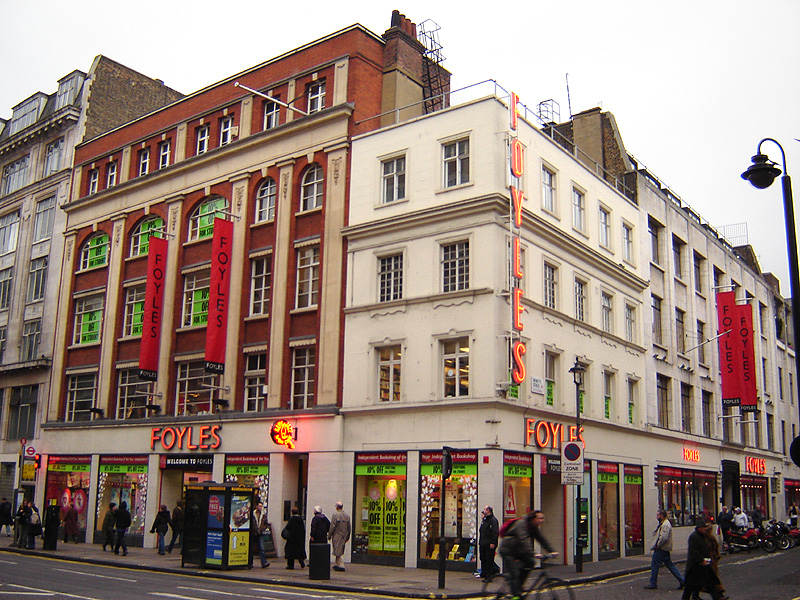
The Foyles Building, Charing Cross Road, London 2006

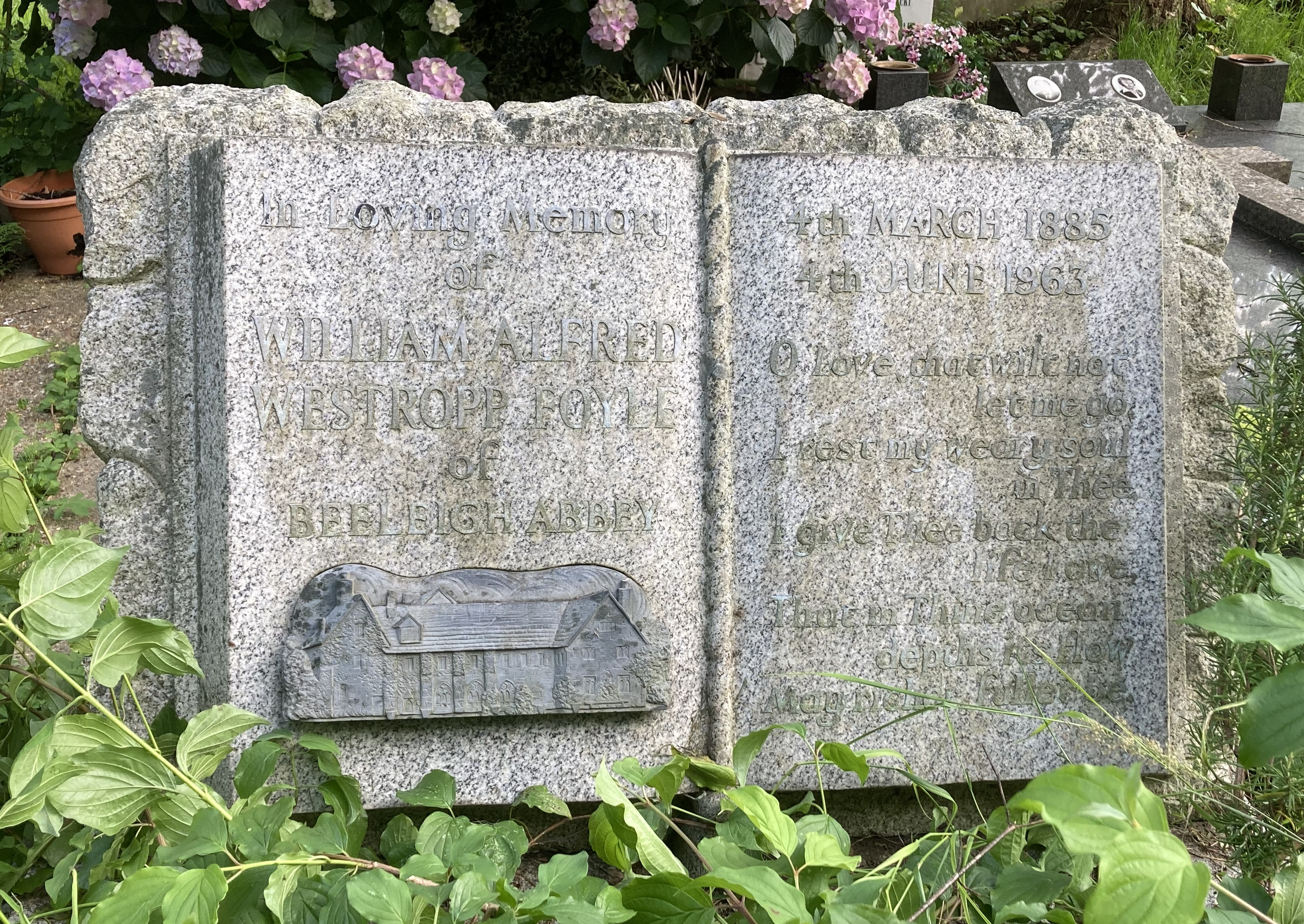
Grave of William Alfred Westropp Foyle in Highgate Cemetery

William Alfred Westropp Foyle (1885–1963) was a British bookseller and businessman who co-founded Foyles bookshop in 1903 with his brother Gilbert Foyle.

William Foyle was one of the leading London booksellers of the 20th century. In 1903 he opened his first bookshop with his brother Gilbert and by the late 1920s the business had grown so rapidly that their bookstore in Charing Cross Road held a stock of four million volumes on over thirty miles of bookshelves, and the name of Foyle had become synonymous with bookselling in London. His vision for the business was a bookshop for the world - for every one from any station in life - "The People's Bookshop". His inspiration was James Lackington's late 18th century "Temple of Muses" at Chiswell Street, London.

The Foyle brothers were determined to create the greatest bookshop in the world. Foyles became increasingly popular with customers and members of the public throughout the world. In 1930, Foyle's nineteen-year-old daughter, Christina, brought together famous writers and distinguished figures, along with members of the public, to create the world's first public literary luncheon.

In May 1936, the Left Book Club was established, and towards the end of 1936 a group of "neo-Tories" mooted the idea of a right-wing book club. Foyle and his daughter Christina undertook to organize it, and the Right Book Club was launched at a luncheon at the Grosvenor House Hotel in April 1937, with Lord Stonehaven, the recently retired chairman of the Conservative Party, presiding.

During the Second World War, Foyle bought Beeleigh Abbey, a 12th-century monastery on the River Chelmer at Maldon, Essex. Although Foyle had collected books from an early age, it was at Beeleigh Abbey that he was able to house the books properly, forming one of the largest English private libraries of the 20th century. From 1963 to 1999 Christina Foyle lived at and maintained the Beeleigh estate. In July 2000 the library was sold at auction by Christie's auction house. The three day sale realised some £12,000,000, the most expensive item, a Medieval French work, selling for £883,750. It was the single most valuable collection of books ever to be sold at auction in Britain or Europe.

Foyle died at Beeleigh Abbey on 4 June 1963 and is buried on the east side of Highgate Cemetery, close to his son William Richard Foyle who had died six years earlier.
