= Albi Rosenthal =

German antiquarian and musicologist (1914–2004)

Albrecht Gabriel Rosenthal (5 October 1914 – 3 August 2004), called Albi, was a distinguished music scholar and antiquarian bookseller. He played an important role in Mozart scholarship in the 20th century. An anonymous obituarist for The Times wrote, "For half a century Albi (Albrecht) Rosenthal was probably the best known and most respected representative of his profession not only in this country but internationally."

== Family background and upbringing ==
He was born in Munich into a family that was already experienced and successful in the trade of selling rare books. His great-grandfather Joseph Rosenthal was a lover of old books who ran an arts and antique shop. His great-uncle Ludwig Rosenthal (1840–1928) became a successful antiquarian bookseller; Ludwig's younger brother Jacques Rosenthal (1854–1937), Albi's grandfather, started out working for Ludwig and by 1895 had his own business. Jacques' son Erwin Rosenthal (1889–1981), Albi's father, earned a Ph.D. in art history and published extensively in this field. Working for the family business, he opened branches of Jacques' firm in Berlin and Lugano.

Rosenthal later (1966) wrote of the trade of antiquarian bookselling and how, during the time of his ancestors in Germany, it had become far more scholarly and systematic in character:

Not only the phenomenal spread of scholarship and bibliographical research, but also the demands and exigencies of a more methodical, 'professional' type of specialist collector and librarian are reflected in the personalities of the successful international booksellers at the turn of the [20th] century. The term 'wissenschaftliches Antiquariat'—'wissenschaftlich' meaning 'scholarly' rather than 'scientific'—became the hallmark of the leading firms in Germany. Their catalogues often included descriptions by eminent scholars of books and MSS. [manuscripts], and several of the antiquarian booksellers themselves became recognised authorities in their special fields.

This description also characterizes the scholar-merchant role that Rosenthal eventually found in this field.

Rosenthal described his father Erwin as "a distinguished art historian and a wonderful teacher". He reminisced: "During my schooldays at the Wilhelmsgymnasium I went to his study in the evenings and we looked at books and pictures together. By the time I came to England, I was fairly well advanced in the study of art history."

== Career in England ==
The reason Rosenthal went to England was that in 1933, Adolf Hitler came to power in Germany. Since they were Jewish, the Rosenthals were imperiled and had to flee. Albi's family migrated to London. Not all Rosenthals escaped; three of Erwin's cousins died in the Theresienstadt Ghetto (see Ludwig Rosenthal).

Albi Rosenthal, who left Germany at just the age when he might have begun a university education, nonetheless established himself as a scholar without receiving an academic degree of any sort. When he arrived in London at age 18, he was already fairly knowledgeable about art history from his father's training. He spent his first six months on his own, living in a scholar's family home and spending his days reading about illuminated manuscripts and palaeography at the British Museum, which at the time was the national library of Great Britain. With the aid of his father, Albi obtained a job offer to work as an assistant at the Warburg Institute from its head, Professor Fritz Saxl. Rosenthal was assigned to work with Rudolf Wittkower and flourished in this role, producing his first scholarly publication at the age of 21; about "a discovery I had made about a Dürer watercolour". In 1936, Rosenthal began running a business selling antiquarian books out of his lodgings, though for the time it was only a part-time enterprise; he issued his first scholarly catalogue in 1939. In November 1940, after the Second World War had broken out, his quarters were destroyed by German bombs (the inventory survived), and Rosenthal moved to Oxford, where he put down roots, opening a shop in Turl Street. He resided in Oxford for the rest of his life, though making numerous journeys in search of rare books and other business purposes. In the long run, the shop (which later moved to Broad Street) proved inessential, and was eventually abandoned, as much of the business was for export; perhaps more important was the preparation of catalogues explaining to buyers what was available.

== As collector ==
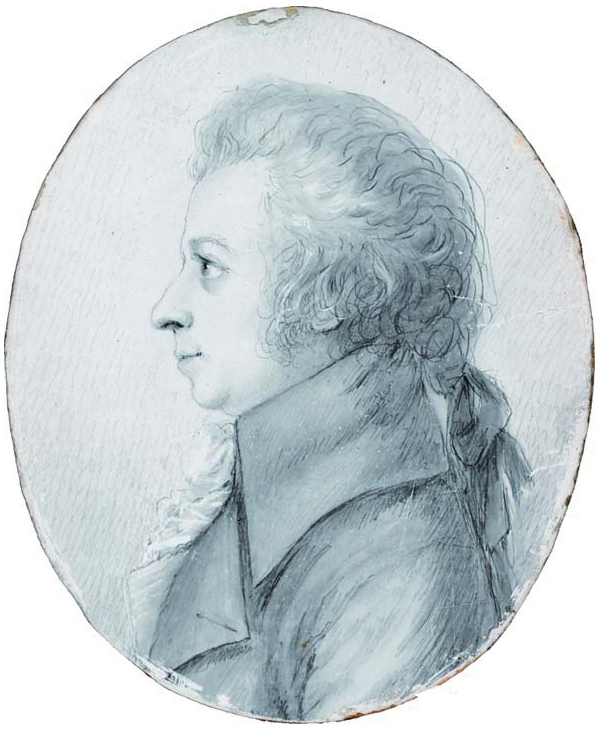
Dora Stock's 1789 portrait of Mozart

Outside his profession narrowly defined, Rosenthal pursued an interest as a collector. When he turned 21, his mother made him a handsome gift – a letter written by Mozart, for which she had paid DM 6000 at an antique dealer's in Munich. His own Mozart collecting focused not on autographs but first editions, of which 45 appeared during Mozart's lifetime. In 1991, Rosenthal's collection of music and other items was the heart of a display at Oxford University, commemorating the 200 years since Mozart's death; when he turned 80, Rosenthal donated the collection to the Bodleian Library at Oxford. Rosenthal also came to be the possessor of an unusually precious Mozart document, the tiny portrait executed in silverpoint by Dora Stock in 1789 during the composer's visit to her home in Dresden; it is the last authenticated Mozart portrait. The portrait had come into the Rosenthal family after its previous owner, Henri Hinrichsen, had been killed in the Auschwitz concentration camp; according to Die Welt, "[Hinrichsen's] heirs gave the picture to the Rosenthal family in thanks for their help." Rosenthal kept the portrait during his lifetime, whereupon it was sold in 2005 by his heirs to the International Mozarteum Foundation in Salzburg for 250,000 British pounds.

== Scholarship ==
- Among Albi Rosenthal's contributions to scholarship was his co-editorship (with Alan Tyson) of Mozart's personal catalog of works. The edition achieved a perhaps-surprising level of scholarly rigor in reproducing, at Rosenthal's insistence, the entire sequence of near-identical blank pages that were left behind when Mozart died in 1791.
- Rosenthal was the first to notice that Felix Mendelssohn had actually written more than one violin concerto. In addition to the celebrated concerto of 1844, Mendelssohn also was the composer of a concerto for violin and string orchestra, a work from his childhood; i.e. 1822. Rosenthal was instrumental in making the manuscript of this concerto available to the violinist Yehudi Menuhin, who produced a published edition and attempted (not entirely successfully) to restore it to the mainstream repertoire.
- Rosenthal's experience with manuscripts led him to develop the ability to spot forged material, and he remarked to Sheila Markham that "I have unmasked quite a few forgeries in my time."

== Honours ==
Two Festschriften were published in honour of Albi Rosenthal, marking his 70th and 80th birthdays. In 1979 he was awarded an honorary degree from Oxford University. As Rosenthal noted this was especially meaningful to him in that the circumstances of his life had prevented him from getting any sort of degree before.

== Family life ==
In 1947 Rosenthal married Maud Levy, who was the daughter of Oscar Levy, a distinguished Nietzsche scholar. The couple had two sons and two daughters. One of the sons was Jim Rosenthal, who became a well-known sportscaster and the father of actor Tom Rosenthal.

Rosenthal died in Oxford in 2004, aged 89.
