= Anthony Ludovici =

British philosopher, sociologist, social critic and polyglot (1882–1971)

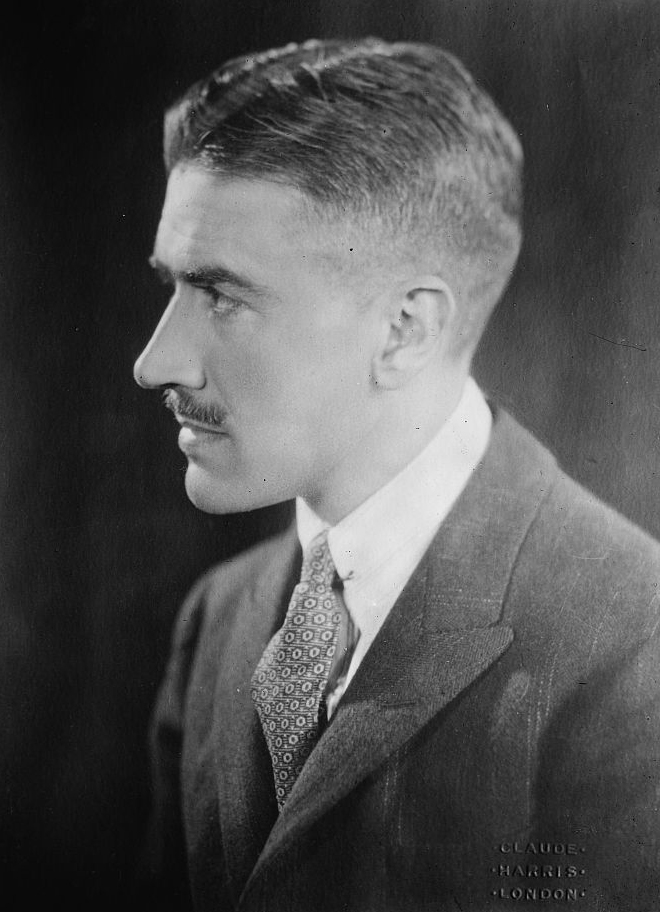
- Ludovici in 1927
- Born: Anthony Mario Ludovici; 8 January 1882; London, England
- Died: 3 May 1971 (aged 89); London, England
- Spouse: Elsie Finnimore Buckley (m. 1920)
- Relatives: Albert Ludovici Sr. (grandfather)

Philosophical work
- Era: 20th-century philosophy
- Region: Western philosophy: British philosophy
- School: Continental philosophy Counter-Enlightenment; Nietzscheanism
- Institutions: English Mistery
- Main interests: Aesthetics; Economics; Eugenics; Metaphysics; Politics; Religion; Society

Anthony Mario Ludovici MBE (8 January 1882 – 3 April 1971) was a British philosopher, sociologist, social critic and polyglot. He is known as a proponent of aristocracy and anti-egalitarianism, and in the early 20th century was a leading British conservative author. He wrote on subjects including art, metaphysics, politics, economics, religion, the differences between the sexes and races, health, and eugenics.

Ludovici began his career as an artist, painting and illustrating books. He was private secretary to sculptor Auguste Rodin for several months in 1906. He later wrote over 30 books, and translated many others.

== Early life ==
Ludovici was born in London, England on 8 January 1882 to Albert Ludovici, and Marie Cals. Ludovici's father and grandfather (Albert Ludovici, Sr.) were both artists. He was of Basque, French, German and Italian ancestry. He was educated privately, in England and abroad but chiefly by his mother. As a young student he became friends with Harry Guy Radcliffe Drew, whom he met at the Paris Exhibition of 1900. Years later he befriended Drew's young daughters Dorothy (later a student of F. M. Alexander) and Joyce (better known as architect Jane Drew). He married Elsie Finnimore Buckley on 20 March 1920, and they first lived at 35 Central Hill, Upper Norwood in South London. He spent several years in Germany where he studied Nietzsche's writings in the original German. He was fluent in several languages.

During the year 1906, Ludovici was private secretary to the sculptor Auguste Rodin, and as such had a close association with him. He later wrote of his personal experiences of Rodin's personality and art, as well as his own opinions, in articles first appearing in the Cornhill Magazine from 1923, and in 1926 published in a book Personal Reminiscences of Auguste Rodin. In the summer of 1908 he first met and befriended Dr. Oscar Levy, editor of The Complete Works of Friedrich Nietzsche, the first translation of Nietzsche's works in English. Ludovici contributed several volumes. Levy introduced him to his future wife Elsie F. Buckley. He began lecturing on art, politics, religion, and the philosophy of Friedrich Nietzsche, about whom he wrote Who is to be Master of the World?: An Introduction to the Philosophy of Friedrich Nietzsche (1909) and Nietzsche: His Life and Works (1910). Nietzsche scholar William Mackintire Salter called Nietzsche: His Life and Works "the well-nigh perfect short manual" on Nietzsche. His pioneering work on Nietzsche's aesthetic, Nietzsche and Art (1911), was one of the first attempts of its kind in Europe. It was based on a course of lectures Ludovici had delivered at University College, London, in late 1910. According to Steven Aschheim, Nietzsche and Art was "a unique attempt to write a Nietzschean history of art in terms of rising aristocratic and decadent-democratic epochs". This was the year of the first Parliament Act 1911, cutting back the power of the House of Lords. It also marks a watershed or change in Ludovici's writing, to a more overt political line, which would only sharpen over the next 25 years.

During World War I he joined the New Army as a translator, and then served as an artillery officer at Armentières and the Somme, where he described himself as "a miserable and vermin-ridden trench-rat", and then in the Intelligence Staff at the War Office, where after two years of service he rose to head of his department (MI6 A):

“I was told to report to the OC MI6 at the War Office, where my languages could be put to some use and where I contrived to make myself sufficiently useful to be retained. And after two years’ work in intelligence, in 1919, as General Staff Officer, third grade, with the rank of Captain, I rose to be the head of my department (MI6 A).”

He was awarded the Order of the British Empire, which he immediately returned because he felt that it was too easily attainable and held by too many people. He attained the rank of Captain during World War I., He was subsequently called 'Captain' as a nickname.

Ludovici came across the Alexander Technique in 1925 and said he had lessons in 'deportment' over a period of four years with F.M. Alexander.

== Writing ==
Ludovici's writing was varied, and took traditional conservative stances on social issues. Liberalism, socialism, Marxism, Christianity, feminism, multiculturalism, the modern culture of consumerism and revolt against tradition constituted Ludovici's main areas of attack. As a young man his fin de siècle reading was typically dominated by science and the popularization of the doctrine of evolution. Ludovici was especially influenced by the important debate that took place in the late 1880s between Thomas Henry Huxley and Henry Wace, with the young Ludovici fully adopting Huxley's philosophical position of agnosticism.

"From about my seventeenth year, my reading of science, especially biology, zoology and astronomy, became regular and assiduous. I read every book by Darwin, Haeckel, Huxley, Romanes, Spencer and Proctor that I could lay my hands on. With great avidity, I also read Huxley’s famous controversy with Wace, following the arguments on each side with breathless interest and becoming a convinced agnostic in the process. But the two authors that probably exerted the greatest influence on me in my early twenties were Schopenhauer and Schiller. The former enlightened me enormously on psychology, and I still regard him as the greatest European psychologist who appeared between Montaigne and Freud. Indeed, there is much in his work that anticipates Freud’s discoveries, a fact to which I have more than once called attention, and Nietzsche owed him many a profound observation, the source of which, however, is rarely acknowledged."

He wrote "I have long been an opponent and critic of Christianity, democracy, and anarchy in art and literature. I am particularly opposed to 'Abstract Art,' which I trace to Whistler's heretical doctrines of art and chiefly to his denial that the subject matters, his assimilation of the graphic arts and music, and his insistence on the superior importance of the composition and colour-harmony of a picture, over its representational content." He was an early critic of Jacob Epstein, attacking him in The New Age, to which he contributed as an art critic before the Great War.

In his A Defence of Aristocracy (1915), Ludovici defends aristocracy against government in popular control. In The False Assumptions of "Democracy" (1921), he attacked the democratic idea and the liberal attitude in general, as being unnatural. A Defence of Conservatism (1927) defends tradition as being tied to survival.

For Ludovici, egalitarianism was a denial of the innate biological differences between individuals, the sexes and races. He criticized what he saw as the sentimental coddling of the mediocre and botched. His articles were a regular feature of the New Pioneer, a far-right journal controlled by Viscount Lymington and closely linked to the British People's Party. Ludovici repeatedly warned of the dangers of miscegenation and defended incest as an appropriate response to racial mixing, arguing that society should act 'to break down the barriers now preventing the mating of close relatives' as it was the only way to cause 'a purification of our stock.'

== Views ==
Ludovici was a nationalist, traditionalist and a supporter of eugenics. He was also a devoted monarchist who held Charles I in high regard. In the 1930s, he gave speeches before English Mistery meetings, some of which were published.

== Later life ==
He was on the Selection Committee of the Right Book Club, with Norman Thwaites, Trevor Blakemore, Collinson Owen and W. A. Foyle.

After the Second World War, Ludovici fell into obscurity. In 1936, he had written enthusiastically about Adolf Hitler, whom he had met personally that year, along with many other high-ranking Nazi leaders.

Ludovici was dismissed from his intelligence work on 14 August 1940 and his house was subsequently raided allegedly due to his membership of the political group The Right Club. On Friday 8 October 1940, Ludovici was interviewed at Scotland Yard, and then released.

From 1955 until 1969 Ludovici wrote a series of articles in the monthly journal The South African Observer. Topics under his analysis included The Essentials of Good Government in a series of 20 monthly parts, and Public Opinion in England in a similar series.

== Works ==
=== Non-fiction ===
- Who is to be Master of the World? An Introduction to the Philosophy of Friedrich Nietzsche. Edinburgh: T. N. Foulis, 1909.
- Nietzsche: His Life and Works (Philosophies Ancient and Modern). London: Constable, 1910 [New York: Dodge, 1910].
- Nietzsche and Art. London: Constable, 1911. Boston: J. W. Luce, 1912 [New York: Haskell House, 1971].
- A Defence of Aristocracy: A Text-Book for Tories. London: Constable, 1915 [Boston: Phillips, 1915. Second edition, London: Constable, 1933].
- Man's Descent from the Gods: Or, The Complete Case Against Prohibition. London: William Heinemann, 1921 [New York: A. A. Knopf, 1921].
- The False Assumptions of "Democracy". London: Heath Cranton, 1921.
- Woman: A Vindication. London: Constable, 1923 [New York: A. A. Knopf, 1923. Second edition, London: Constable 1929].
- Lysistrata: Or, Woman's Future and Future Woman. London: K. Paul, Trench, Trubner & co., ltd., 1925.
- Personal Reminiscences of Auguste Rodin. Philadelphia: J.B. Lippincott Company, 1926. London: John Murray, 1926.
- A Defence of Conservatism: A Further Text-Book for Tories. London: Faber and Gwyer, 1927.
- Man: An Indictment. London: Constable, 1927 [New York: E. P. Dutton, 1927].
- The Night-Hoers: Or, The Case Against Birth Control and an Alternative. London: Herbert Jenkins, 1928.
- The Sanctity of Private Property. London: Heath Cranton an address on the right of private property and its sanctity delivered by the author to a meeting of the St.James's Kin of the English Mistery on November 10, 1931.
- The Secret of Laughter. London: Constable, 1932.
- Health and Education Through Self-Mastery. Watts, 1933. [London: Mouritz, 2016].
- The Choice of a Mate (The International Library of Sexology and Psychology). London: John Lane, The Bodley Head, 1935.
- The Truth About Childbirth; Lay Light on Maternal Morbidity and Mortality. London, Kegan Paul & Co. 1937; New York: E. P. Dutton & Co., 1938.
- Jews, and the Jews in England (written under the pen-name of Cobbett). London: Boswell, 1938.
- The Four Pillars of Health. A Contribution to Post-War Planning. London: Heath Cranton Limited, 1945.
- The Child: An Adult's Problem; First Aid to Parents. London: Carroll and Nicholson, 1948.
- Enemies of Women: the Origins in Outline of Anglo-Saxon Feminism. London: Carroll & Nicholson 1948.
- The Quest of Human Quality: How to Rear Leaders. London: Rider, 1952.
- Religion for Infidels. London: Holborn, 1961.
- The Specious Origins of Liberalism: The Genesis of a Delusion. London: Britons, 1967.

Compilations

- Day, John V., ed. (2003). The Lost Philosopher: The Best of Anthony M. Ludovici. Berkeley, CA: Educational Translation and Scholarship Foundation. ISBN 0-9746264-0-6.

Autobiography

- The Confessions of an Anti-Feminist: The Autobiography of Anthony M. Ludovici, Day, John V. (ed.), San Francisco: Counter-Currents, 2018. ISBN 1940933323

=== Fiction ===
- Mansel Fellowes. London: Grant Richards, 1918.
- Catherine Doyle: The Romance of a Trice-Married Lady. London: Hutchinson & Co., 1919.
- Too Old for Dolls: A Novel. London: Hutchinson & Co., 1920.
- What Woman Wishes. London: Hutchinson & Co., 1921.
- The Goddess that Grew Up. London: Hutchinson & Co., 1922.
- French Beans. London: Hutchinson & Co., 1923.
- The Taming of Don Juan. London: Hutchinson, 1924.

=== As translator ===
- Thoughts out of Season, by Friedrich Nietzsche. London: T. N. Foulis, 1909.
- Ecce Homo, by Friedrich Nietzsche. New York: Macmillan, 1911.
- Twilight of the Idols, by Friedrich Nietzsche. New York: Macmillan, 1911.
- The Case of Wagner; Nietzsche Contra Wagner; Selected Aphorisms. Edinburgh and London: T. N. Foulis, 1911.
- The Letters of a Post-impressionist; being the Familiar Correspondence of Vincent van Gogh. London, Constable, 1912.
- The Life of Nietzsche, by Elisabeth Förster-Nietzsche. New York: Sturgis and Walton, 1912–1915.
- Germany and its Evolution in Modern Times, by Henri Lichtenberger. New York: H. Holt and Co., 1913.
- Selected Letters of Friedrich Nietzsche. London: William Heinemann, 1921.
- On the Road with Wellington, by August Ludolf Friedrich Schaumann. London: William Heinemann ltd., 1924.

=== Articles ===
- "Art: A Dialogue Overheard at a Picture Gallery," The New Age, Vol. XI, No. 27, 1912, pp. 642–644.
- "Art," The New Age, Vol. XII, No. 6, 1912, p. 135.
- "Art: A Question of Finish", The New Age, Vol. XII, No. 21, 1913, p. 508.
- "Art: A Stroll Down Bond Street," The New Age, Vol. XIII, No. 2, 1913, p. 42.
- "Art: An Open Letter to my Friends," The New Age, Vol. XIV, No. 9, 1914, pp. 278–281.
- "Art: False Remedies and Other Considerations," The New Age, Vol. XIV, No. 11, 1914, pp. 345–346.
- "Art: Les Independents and the Salon des Beaux Arts," The New Age, Vol. XV, No. 2, 1914, p. 44.
- "Conscience and Fanaticism," The New Age, Vol. XXV, No. 24, 1919, pp. 395–396.
- "Conscience and Fanaticism: A Reply to Mr. G. Pitt Rivers," The New Age, Vol. XXVI, No. 10, 1920, pp. 155–156.
- "Mr. Clutton Brock on Art," The New Age, Vol. XXVI, No. 13, 1920, pp. 201–202.
- "Wine and Spirits," The New Age, Vol. XXVII, No. 2, 1920, p. 24.
- "The Conservative Programme - A Suggestion," Fortnightly Review, New Series, Vol. CXI, 1922, pp. 948–962.
- "The Conservative Programme: A Further Suggestion,", Fortnightly Review, New Series, Vol. CXIII, 1923, pp. 600–614.
- "Woman's Encroachment on Man's Domain," Current History, Vol. XXVII, October 1927, pp. 21–25.
- "Transform Society's Values," in Chaim Newman, (ed.) Gentile and Jew; a Symposium on the Future of the Jewish People. London: Alliance Press, 1945, pp. 165–185.
- "The Essentials of Good Government," The South African Observer, Vol. IX-X, September 1963/May 1965.
- "Public Opinion in England," The South African Observer, Vol. X-XIII, July 1965/June 1968
