= Jacques Rosenthal =

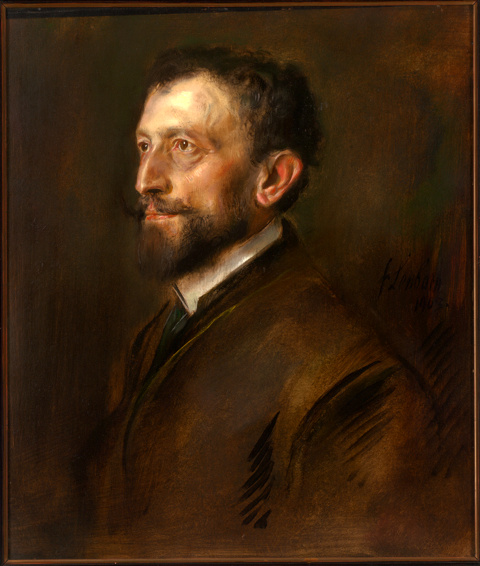
Franz von Lenbach: Portrait (1904)

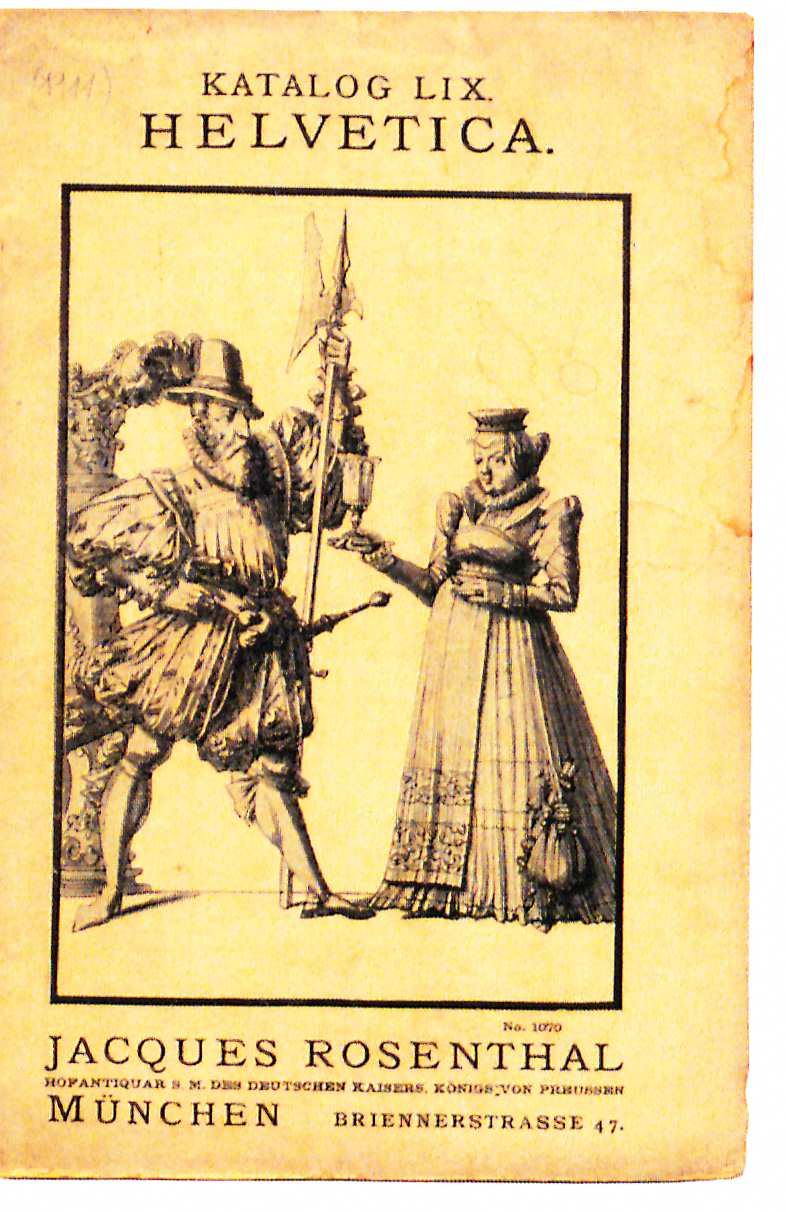
Helvetica antiquarian bookshop catalog (1911)

Jacques Rosenthal (born July 17, 1854, in Fellheim as Jakob Rosenthal; died October 5, 1937, in Munich) was a German Jewish bookseller and antiquarian bookseller.

== Life ==
Jakob was the youngest son of the market trader Joseph Rosenthal and Dorlene, née Bacharach. His mother came from a local Jewish butcher's family from Fellheim in what is now the district of Unterallgäu. His father Joseph ran an art and antiques shop in Fellheim. His three other siblings were Jette, Nathan and Ludwig. Jakob initially grew up in the rural Jewish community of Fellheim. In May 1867, after all restrictions on Jews in Germany were lifted, the family moved to Munich. There he learned English and French from a private tutor. In Munich, he trained as an antiquarian bookseller in his brother Ludwig Rosenthal's business. After his apprenticeship, he took up a position in his profession, initially in Ernst Carlebach's antiquarian bookshop in Heidelberg, later moving to the Bielefeld antiquarian bookshop in Karlsruhe. He then joined his brother Ludwig's company on January 20, 1874, as a junior partner alongside his brother Nathan.

=== Paris ===
In 1878, he went to Paris on behalf of the company. There he made contacts with well-known figures in the city's bookselling trade such as Léopold Victor Delisle and Emile Chatellain. He changed his name from Jakob to Jacques. Among other things, he was able to acquire a manuscript by Frederick the Great, which the latter had sent to Voltaire for examination. He acquired the "Evangelium Prumense" for the Berlin National Library. Jacques and Ludwig Rosenthal also maintained close contacts with the Bavarian court under Ludwig II.

=== Rosenthal Antiquariat in Munich ===
On December 21, 1882, Jacques Rosenthal married Emma Guggenheimer, daughter of the Munich wholesaler Simon Guggenheimer. They had two children, Theodora and Erwin. Three uncles worked as bankers at Guggenheimer & Co. Rosenthal was invited to become a citizen of the city of Munich on July 29, 1888. In 1895, the three brothers split the company, and on May 1, 1895, Jacques Rosenthal opened a "book and art antiquarian bookshop" at Karlstraße 10. Between 1909 and 1911, Rosenthal had a villa built at Brienner Straße 47, where the antiquarian bookshop's business premises were also located. The First World War hurt sales but towards the end of the Weimar Republic, the industry flourished again as many monasteries and aristocratic houses in Bavaria and Austria sold their valuable book collections. Rosenthal's son Erwin opened branches in Berlin and in 1920 in Lugano (moving to Zurich in 1929).

At the end of 1932, he suffered a stroke.

== Nazi era ==
When Hitler came to power in Germany in 1933, the Rosenthals were persecuted and their business targeted because of their Jewish heritage. Boycotts, discrimination and professional bans against Jews forced Rosenthal into a silent partnership with his competitor Georg Karl. In July 1935, the city palace at Brienner Strasse 47 was sold. It was later damaged in Allied bombing raids on Munich, which destroyed 90% of the buildings in the old town. The antiquarian bookshop moved to Konradstr. 16 and Rosenthal lived with his wife in the Regina-Palast-Hotel at Maximiliansplatz 5 until his death.

On October 5, 1937, Rosenthal died, relatively unnoticed, at the Hotel Regina in Munich. After a small funeral service, he was buried in the Old Israelite Cemetery.

Erwin Joseph Rosenthal was the father of Bernard M. Rosenthal (born 1920 in Munich, died January 14, 2017, in Oakland), who was an antiquarian in the US, as well as Albi Rosenthal (born 5. October 1914 in München, died 3. August 2004 in Oxford), who worked in Great Britain as a music antiquarian and musicologist, and Gabriella Rosenthal (born September 22, 1913, in Munich; died March 27, 1975, in Israel), Israeli painter, caricaturist and author.

== Restitution of Nazi-looted art ==
The Münchner Stadtmuseum restituted to Rosenthal's heirs a late medieval figure of an apostle that the museum had acquired in on December 2, 1938, at an auction at Adolf Weinmüller.

== Writings ==
- Grolier's Bibliothek. Über ihre Zusammensetzung und ihre Lücken. In: Philobiblon, Jg. 6 (1933), Heft 6, S. 200–214.

== Orders, decorations and honorary titles ==
- Königlich-Preußischer Kronen-Orden IV. Klasse
- Ordre des Palmes Académiques
- Benemerenti, verliehen von Papst Pius XI. im Jahre 1927
- Königlich-Bayerischer Hofantiquar
- Königlich-Preußischer Hofantiquar

== Literature ==
- Fellheim an der Iller. Eine bebilderte Führung durch den ehemaligen jüdischen Ortskern Fellheims, hrs. v. Arbeitskreis Geschichte, Brauchtum und Chronik in Zusammenarbeit mit dem Amt für ländliche Entwicklung und der Gemeinde Fellheim (2007).
- Sigrid Krämer (2005). "Rosenthal, Jakob". Neue Deutsche Biographie (in German). Vol. 22. Berlin: Duncker & Humblot. pp. 77–78. (full text online).
- Stadtarchiv München (Hrsg.), Die Rosenthals. Der Aufstieg einer jüdischen Antiquarsfamilie zu Weltruhm. Mit Beiträgen von Elisabeth Angermair, Jens Koch, Anton Löffelmeier, Eva Ohlen und Ingo Schwab, Wien u. a., Böhlau. 2002, ISBN 3-205-77020-X.
- Bernard M. Rosenthal: Cartel, Clan, or Dynasty? The Olschkis and the Rosenthals 1859–1976. In: Harvard Library Bulletin 25, 4, 1977, S. 386–397.
- Anton Löffelmeier, Michael Stephan: Das Firmen- und Familienarchiv Jacques Rosenthal im Stadtarchiv München. In: Barbara Magen (Hg.): "... denn das eigentliche Studium der Menschheit ist der Mensch.". Beiträge aus der Ägyptologie, der Geschichtswissenschaft, der Koptologie, der Kunstgeschichte, der Linguistik, der Medizin und ihrer Geschichte, der Musikwissenschaft, der Philosophie, der Politikwissenschaft, der Provenienzforschung und der Rechtsgeschichte zu Ehren Alfred Grimms anläßlich seines 65. Geburtstags, Wiesbaden: Harrassowitz 2018, S. 213–224 ISBN 978-3-447-10959-8.
