= Jim Rosenthal =

English sports presenter and commentator

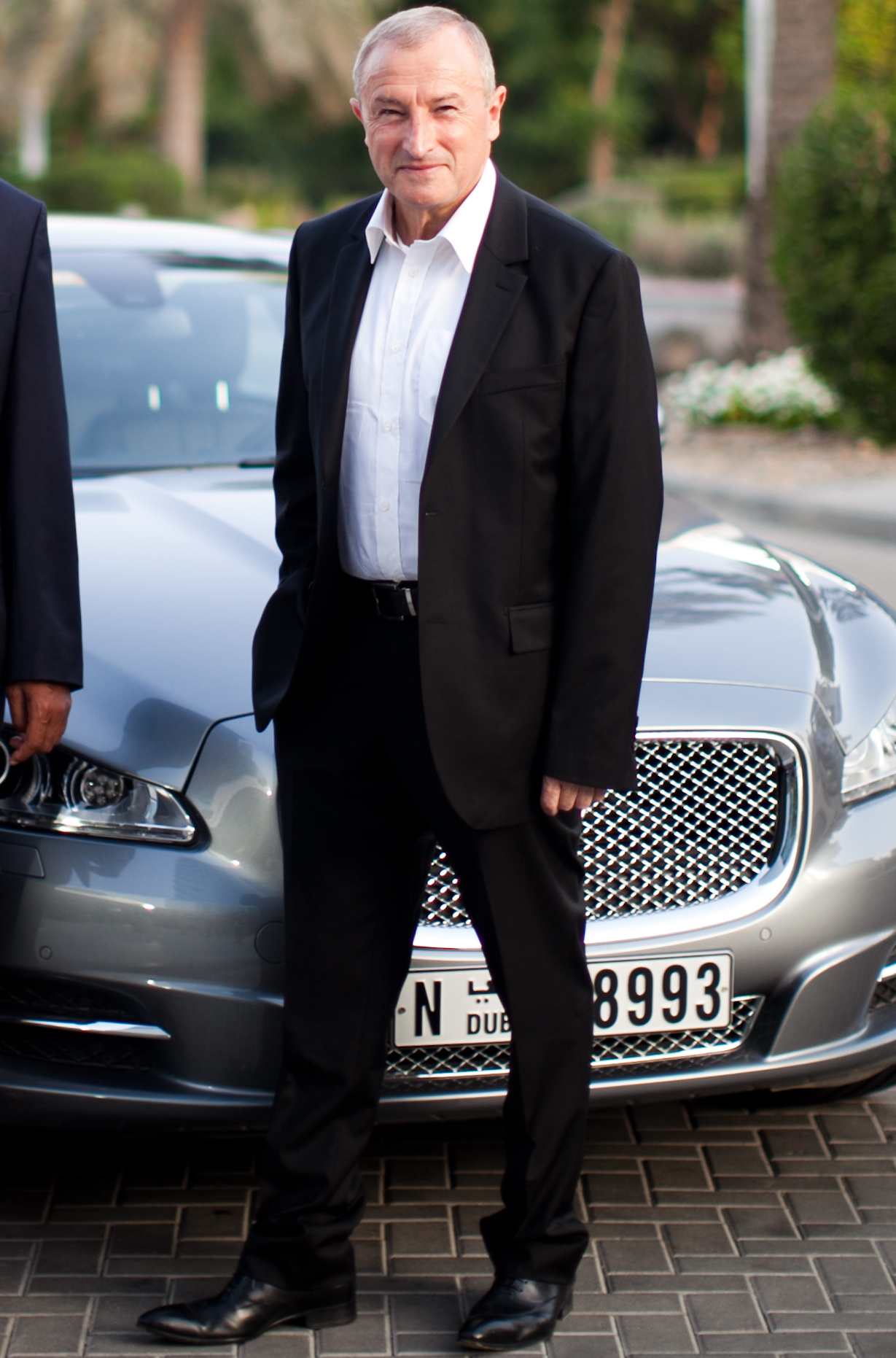
- Born: Jim Rosenthal; 6 November 1947 (age 78); Oxford, England
- Occupation: Radio/Television presenter
- Years active: 1972–present
- Spouse: Chrissy Smith
- Children: Tom
- Family: Oscar Levy (grandfather)

Jim Rosenthal (born 6 November 1947) is an English sports presenter and commentator. In a long broadcasting career, Rosenthal has presented coverage of many sports including football, rugby, automotive racing, boxing and athletics. He has covered eight FIFA World Cups, three Rugby World Cups, two Olympic Games and 150 Formula One races.

== Early life ==
Rosenthal grew up in Oxford, the son of Maud Ruth (née Levy) and Albrecht Gabriel "Albi" Rosenthal, a music scholar and antiquarian book seller who was from an academic family. His father was born in Munich, Germany. His paternal great-grandfather, Leo Olschki, founded the Leo S. Olschki Editore publishing house, and his maternal grandfather was German Jewish physician and writer Oscar Levy.

As a child, Rosenthal demonstrated reluctance to join (as the fourth generation) the family tradition of antiquarian bookselling and instead showed a precocious interest in sportscasting. His father recalled:

When he was growing up, I used to show him the occasional book, and he would say, ‘maybe I’ll be interested in it in a few years’ time’. He was however always interested in sport. As a child, he ran around in the garden playing football doing his own commentary.

Rosenthal attended Josca's Preparatory School before going to Magdalen College School. He then joined the staff of the Oxford Mail and went on to work for BBC local and national radio.

Rosenthal (left) with boxer Errol Christie, some time in the 1980s

Rosenthal worked for Snooker Scene magazine in the early 1970s where his editor was Clive Everton, and Rosenthal, a keen amateur hockey player, edited the short-lived Hockey Scene magazine, also owned by Everton.

== Broadcasting career ==
Rosenthal worked for BBC Radio Birmingham before moving to BBC Radio 2. He worked for the BBC Radio Sports Unit between 1976 and 1980. His television career began when he joined ITV in 1980. He was part of the ITV team covering the FIFA World Cup since 1982.

In the 1980s, Rosenthal commentated on boxing matches for ITV when first-choice commentator Reg Gutteridge was otherwise engaged or unable to travel. In the 1990s, Rosenthal was a presenter of ITV's The Big Fight Live, which reached huge nationwide audiences for boxing contests involving the likes of Nigel Benn, Chris Eubank and Naseem Hamed, then the likes of Amir Khan and Joe Calzaghe when it returned in 2005.

Rosenthal covered three Rugby World Cup campaigns for ITV, including anchoring coverage of England's victory in the 2003 final. He was the presenter of Formula One (F1) motor racing on ITV for eight years and presented 152 Formula One races from 1997. He agreed terms with ITV to present its coverage of the sport in early 1997. In October 2005, it was announced that Steve Rider had been re-recruited by ITV from BBC Sport, to assume Rosenthal's former role for the 2006 Formula One season.

Rosenthal presented ITV's Champions League football coverage, as well as their boxing output. He presented ITV4's Champions League Live show and the channel's live match coverage, until he was dropped in 2008 from his exclusive contract with ITV after 28 years with the channel as the network sought new presenters. ITV's head of news and sport, Mark Sharman, said at the time:

Jim Rosenthal has made a magnificent contribution to ITV Sport over a long period of time but we will no longer tie him to an exclusive contract. He will be free to explore other challenges while ITV Sport will have the opportunity to make on-air changes.

Internationally, Rosenthal regularly hosted the UEFA Gala Dinner in Monaco, a football spectacular that is broadcast across the world. He has presented the live FA Cup draws for ITV, and editions of BBC Radio 5 Live's Sportsweek show.

In 2010, Rosenthal took on announcing duties on game show The Whole 19 Yards and reported for ITV Sport during the opening ceremony of the World Cup in South Africa. In September of that year, he joined Channel 5 to front their Europa League football coverage. Rosenthal said: "I've covered many different sports throughout my career, but football has always been my first love. It's tremendous to be back covering the game at the highest level." His first appearance was on 16 September 2010 covering the game between Liverpool and Steaua Bucharest from Anfield.

In 2011, Rosenthal became the lead presenter on the boxing channel BoxNation. Since 2014, Rosenthal has provided commentary for Channel 4's coverage of Crufts.

In November 2019, Rosenthal became the new "Voice of Jack", replacing and following the death of actor Paul Darrow as the new on-air voice of Oxfordshire's local Jack branded radio stations and their national radio station Union Jack. He is the lead presenter of matchday coverage on Manchester United's in-house channel MUTV and is one of the presenters of Amazon Prime's Premier League coverage.

On 10 May 2021, Rosenthal began broadcasting on the Jack Group’s new breakfast show "Jack's Wake Up Call" together with Trevor Marshall from Jack FM Oxford. The show is broadcast from the Oxford studios where Trevor Marshall was previously presenter of the "Jack's Morning Glory" breakfast show.

== Acting ==
Rosenthal has appeared in Renford Rejects and Footballers' Wives.

== Awards ==
He has twice been named as the Royal Television Society's Sports Presenter of the Year. He was the main anchor of ITV's BAFTA winning coverage of the 2003 Rugby World Cup, which took him to Australia for the final.

== Personal life ==
Rosenthal is a lifelong supporter of his hometown club Oxford United. He wore an Oxford United hat whilst hosting the ITV coverage of the 1986 League Cup final from Wembley Stadium. From 2010 to 2012, Rosenthal was a member of the Oxford United board of directors.

On 17 June 2024, Northampton Town announced that Rosenthal had been appointed to the club's board of directors.

He is married to Chrissy. His son, Tom, is a comedian who has starred in Friday Night Dinner on Channel 4 and Plebs on ITV2. Jim Rosenthal made a guest appearance as a commentator on a chariot race at the start of Plebs Series 2 and made a guest voice appearance as a Grand Prix Commentator in the Friday Night Dinner Series 4 episode "The Funeral".

Awards
Preceded by None	RTS Television Sport Awards; Best Sports Presenter; 1997	Succeeded by Des Lynam
Preceded by Des Lynam	RTS Television Sport Awards; Best Sports Presenter; 1999	Succeeded by Mark Nicholas
