= Jules Dalou =

French sculptor (1838–1902)

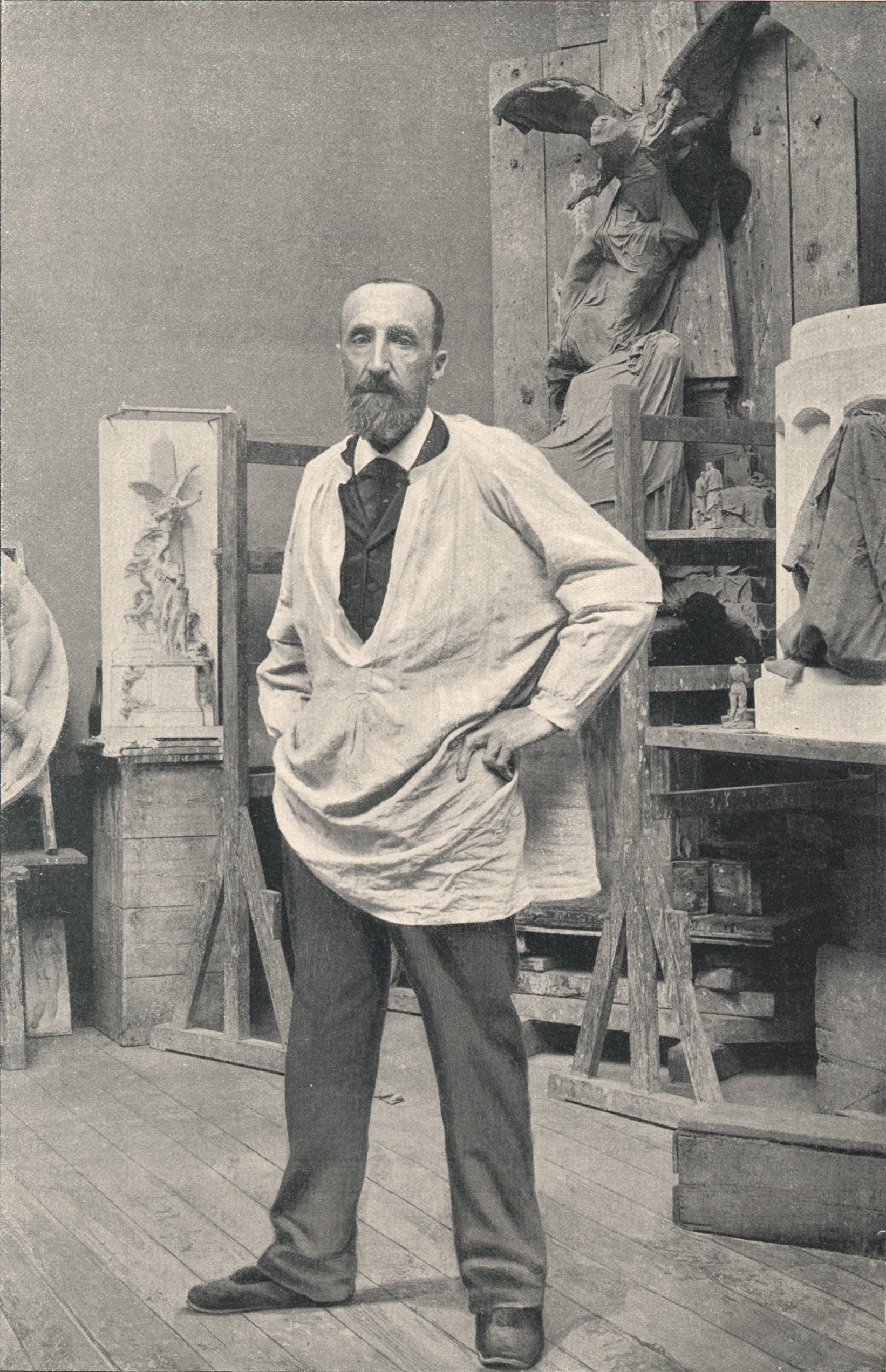
- Jules Dalou in his studio, 1899
- Born: Aimé-Jules Dalou; 31 December 1838; Paris, France
- Died: 15 April 1902 (aged 63); Paris, France
- Education: École nationale supérieure des Beaux-Arts
- Known for: Sculpture
- Notable work: The Triumph of the Republic, 1899 The Triumph of Silenus, 1885; Monument to Eugène Delacroix, 1890 The Tomb of Victor Noir, 1890
- Movement: New Sculpture
- Awards: Commander of the Légion d'Honneur

Aimé-Jules Dalou (French: [ɛme ʒyl dalu]; 31 December 1838 – 15 April 1902) was a 19th-century French sculptor, admired for his perceptiveness, execution, and unpretentious realism.

== Early life ==
Born in Paris to a working-class family of Huguenot background, he was raised in an atmosphere of secularity and Republican socialism. He was the pupil of Jean-Baptiste Carpeaux, who sponsored him for the Petite École (future École nationale supérieure des arts décoratifs), where he sympathized with Alphonse Legros and Fantin-Latour.

In 1854, he attended the École des Beaux-Arts de Paris in the François-Joseph Duret classroom. He combined the vivacity and richness of Carpeaux, for "he was, technically, one of the most distinguished modellers of his time", with the academic insistence on harmonious outlines and scholarly familiarity with the work of Giambologna, Pierre Puget, Peter Paul Rubens and others.

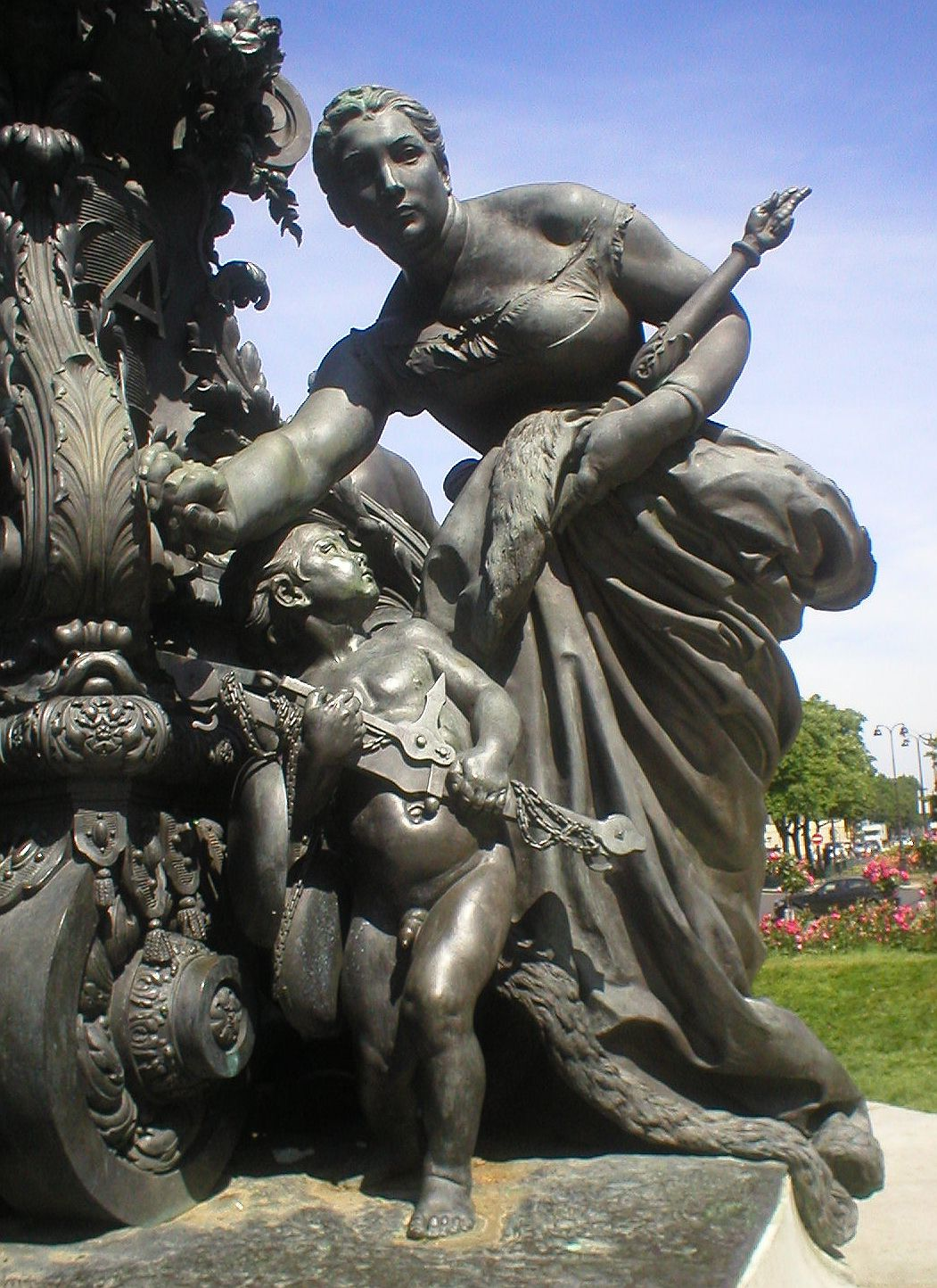
Detail of the Triumph of the Republic, 1899, Place de la Nation, Paris

== Career ==
Dalou first exhibited at the Paris Salon in 1861, but he made no secret of his working-class sympathies. His politics obstructed his career under the Second Empire: he was repeatedly refused the Prix de Rome that opened sculptors' careers to future official commissions. He started to work for decorators, and through this work met Auguste Rodin and began their friendship.

He made a quiet living providing decorative sculpture for the structures that lined Paris's new boulevards and providing wax models for jewelry. He married Irma Vuillier, a partnership that sustained him throughout his life. They had one daughter, Georgette, who was mentally handicapped and required constant care. Dalou's Daphnis and Chloe shown at the Paris Salon of 1869, was purchased by the State.

Having identified himself too publicly with the Paris Commune of 1871, as curator at the Musée du Louvre under Gustave Courbet, he took refuge in England in July 1871, staying at first with his friend the painter and engraver Alphonse Legros. He rapidly made a name through his appointment teaching at the South London Technical Art School and the South Kensington School of Art, also in London. He was convicted in absentia by the French government of participation in the Commune, and given a life sentence.

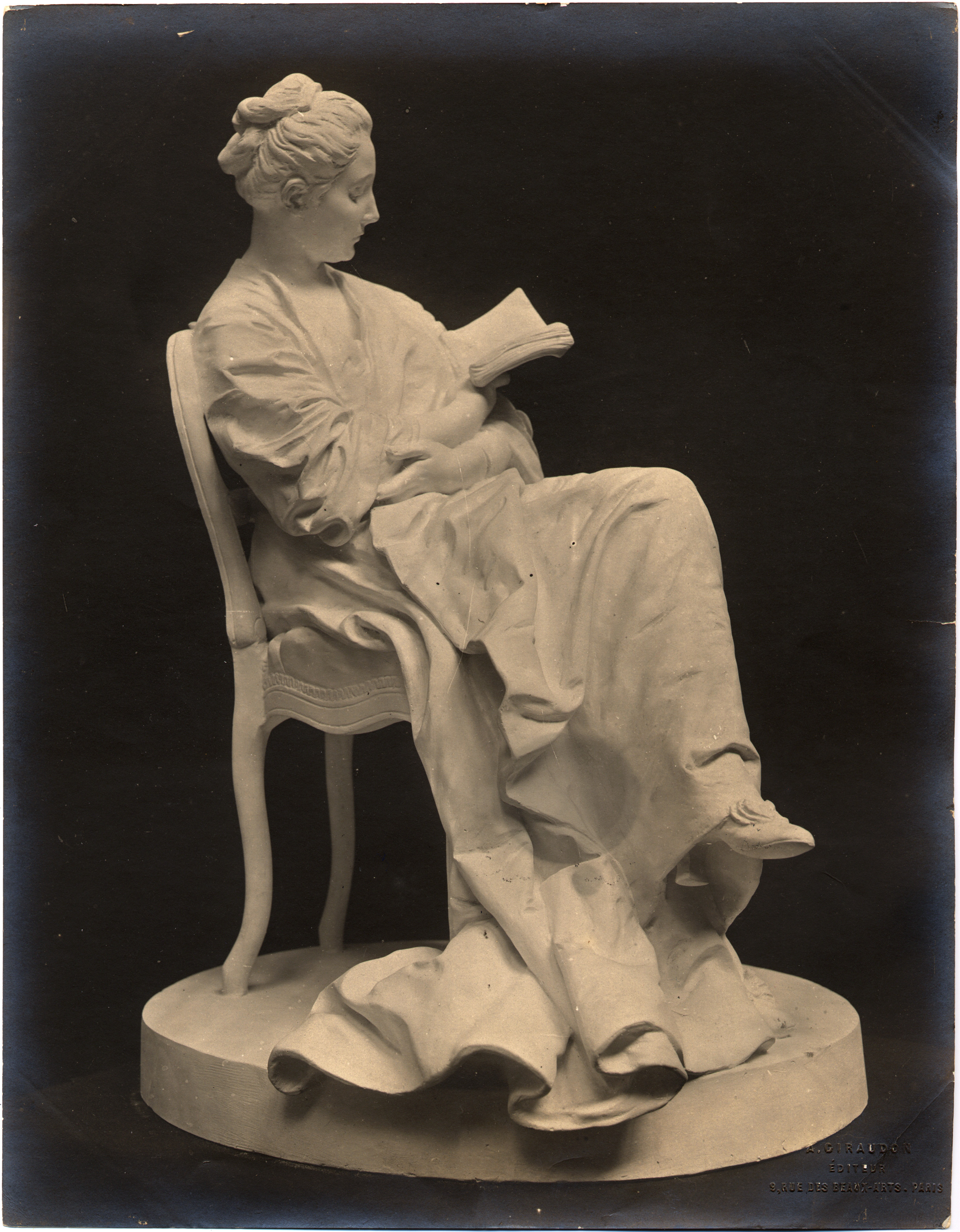
The Reader, plaster statuette, circa 1871–1879. Petit Palais Museum

=== English exile ===
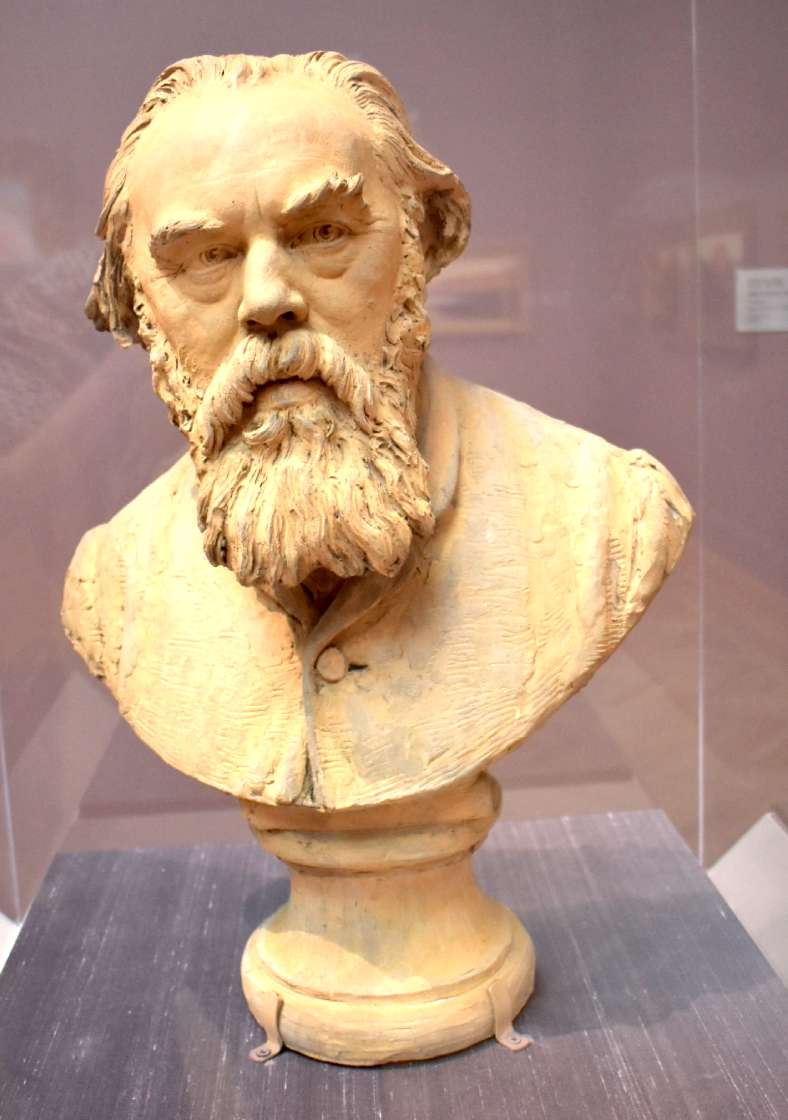
Bust of Albert Ludovici, Sr., 1873, at the Palace of the Legion of Honor, San Francisco

In his eight-year English exile, Dalou's association with City and Guilds of London Art School, the National Art Training School and the artists of the New Sculpture movement laid the foundation for new developments in the post-classical British school of sculpture. He also recommended his friend and colleague Édouard Lantéri to move from France to England. At the same time Dalou executed a remarkable series of terracotta statuettes and groups, such as A French Peasant Woman and The Reader; a series of Boulogne women, such as A Woman of Boulogne telling her Beads; and a series of informal terracotta portrait busts of friends and acquaintances, rarely signed. He was commissioned to produce the large public fountain called Charity, erected at the back of the Royal Exchange (1878), and for Queen Victoria a monument to two young granddaughters in her private chapel at Windsor (1878).

=== Return to France ===
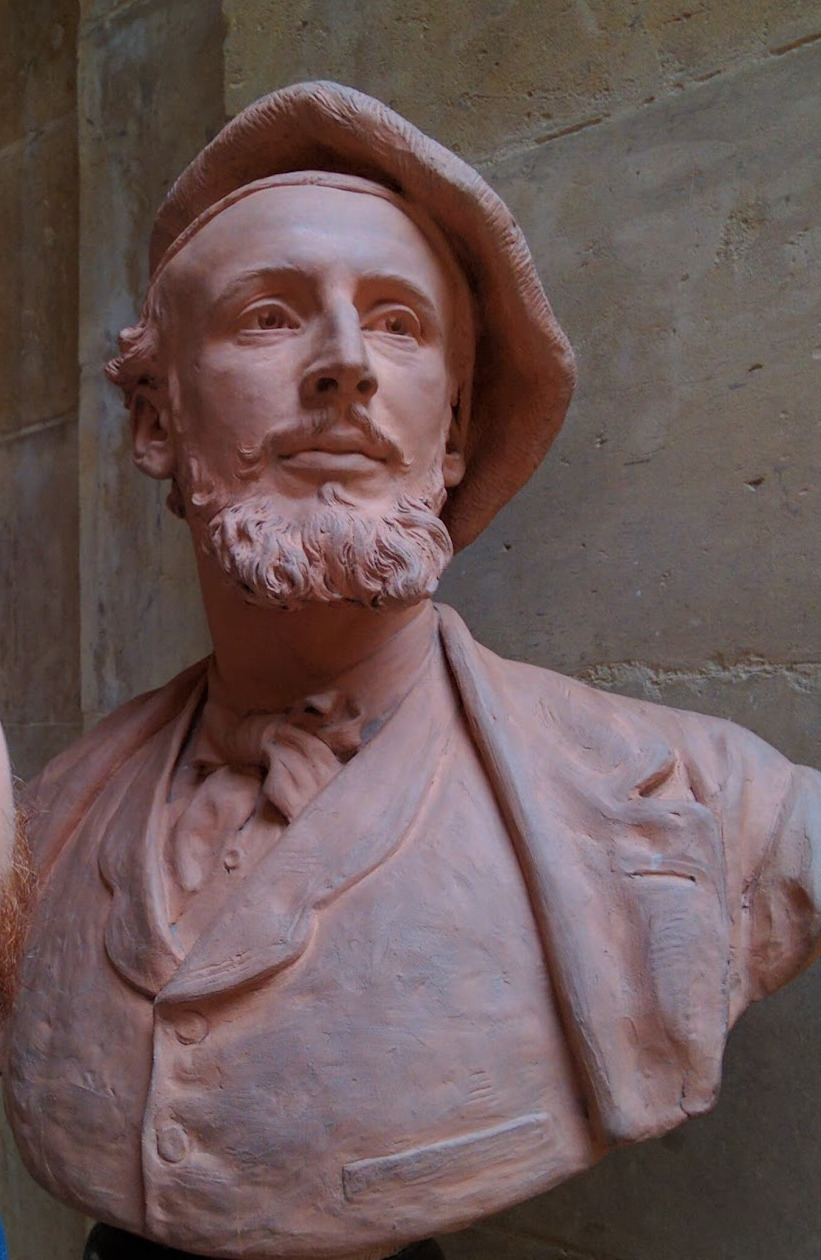

He returned to France in 1879, after the declaration of amnesty, and produced a number of masterpieces. His great relief of Mirabeau replying to Dreux-Brézé illustrating an encounter of 23 June 1789, which was exhibited in 1883 and later at the Palais Bourbon, and the highly decorative panel Fraternity were followed in 1885 by The Triumph of Silenus. For the city of Paris he executed his most elaborate piece, The Triumph of the Republic, erected after twenty years of work in the Place de la Nation, showing a symbolical figure of the Republic, aloft on her car, drawn by lions led by Liberty, attended by Labour and Justice, and followed by Abundance. It is somewhat in the taste of the Louis XIV period.

Within a few days, his great Monument to Alphand (1899), which almost equalled the success achieved by the Monument to Delacroix in the Luxembourg Garden, was inaugurated.

The last of his works, cast posthumously, were a statue of Lazare Hoche in Quiberon (1902), the Monument to Gambetta in Bordeaux (1904), the Monument to Émile Levassor (1907) and the Monument to Scheurer-Kestner (1908) in Paris.

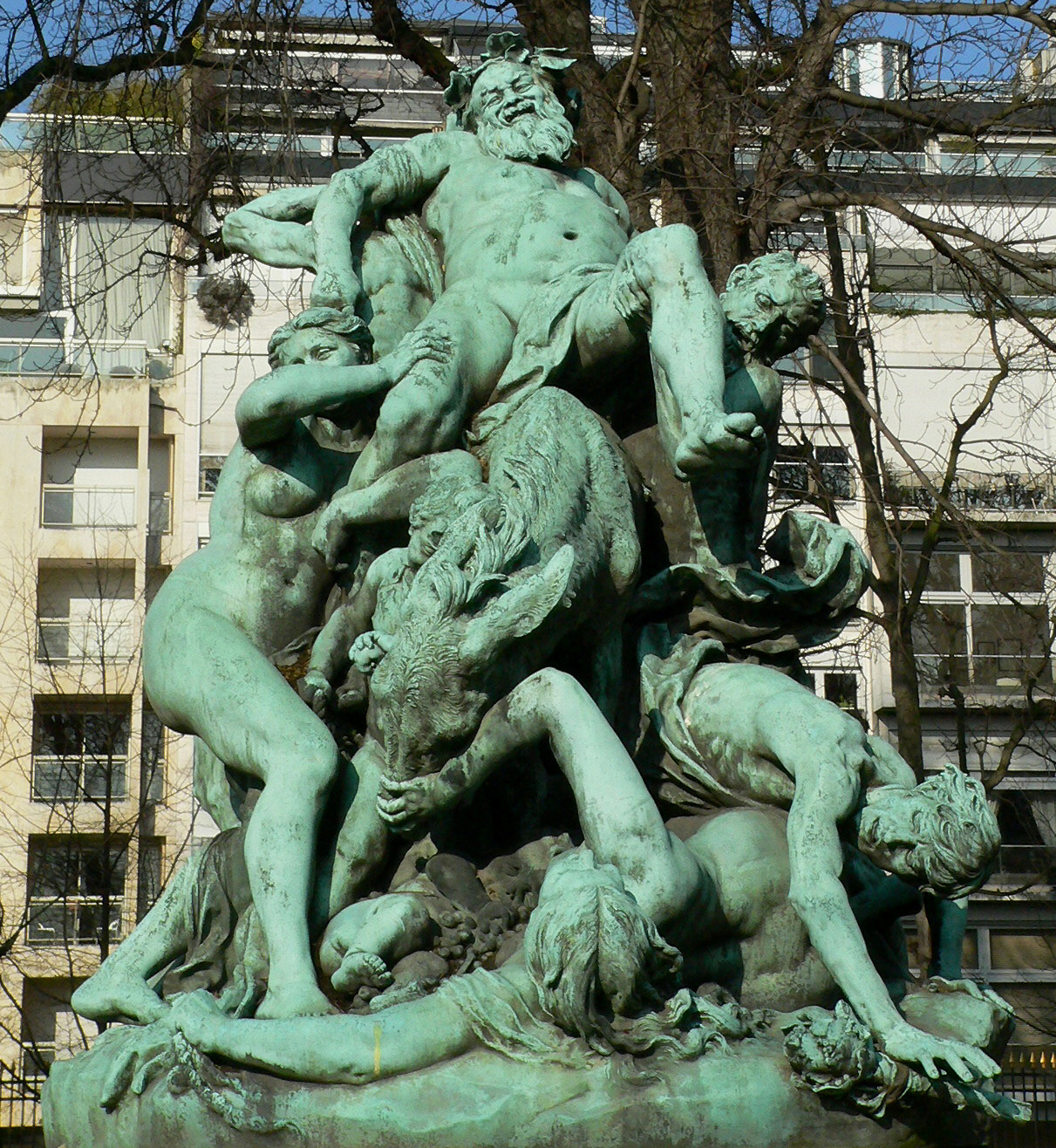
Le Triomphe de Silène, 1885, Luxembourg Garden, Paris

Dalou, who was awarded the Grand Prix of the Exposition Universelle (1889), was made a commander of the Legion of Honor. He was one of the founders of the Société Nationale des Beaux-Arts, and was the first president of the sculpture section.

== Death and legacy ==
Dalou died in Paris on 15 April 1902, aged 63, and was interred in the Cimetière du Montparnasse in Paris. His auction record, set at Sotheby's on 21 May 2014 is £362,500 for Boulonnaise Allaitant Son Enfant (a young mother from Boulogne feeding her child).

== Other works ==
- Antoine-Laurent Lavoisier, National Gallery of Scotland 1866
- Funerary monument to Auguste Blanqui, Père-Lachaise, 1885
- Monument to Victor Noir, Père-Lachaise, 1891
- Monument to Léon Gambetta, Bordeaux, completed after his death by Camille Lefèvre and installed in 1904
- Bust of Alfred Roll, ca 1895, terracotta model for the monument to Jean-Charles Adolphe Alphand, Paris, Musée du Petit Palais
- Fame, 1886, bronze, Bayonne, Musée Bonnat
- National Museum of Serbia
  - Seating Male Figure, bronze, c.1885
- Musée d'Orsay, Paris
  - Femme nue lisant dans un fauteuil, bronze, 1878
  - Grand Paysan, bronze, 197 x 70 x 68 cm
  - Liseuse, vers 1875, bronze
  - Couseuse
  - Travailleur debout tenant une bêche, bronze
  - Tonnelier avec des cordes, bronze, for a projected Monument to Labour
  - Rebatteur de faux, bronze, for the Monument to Labour

== Images ==
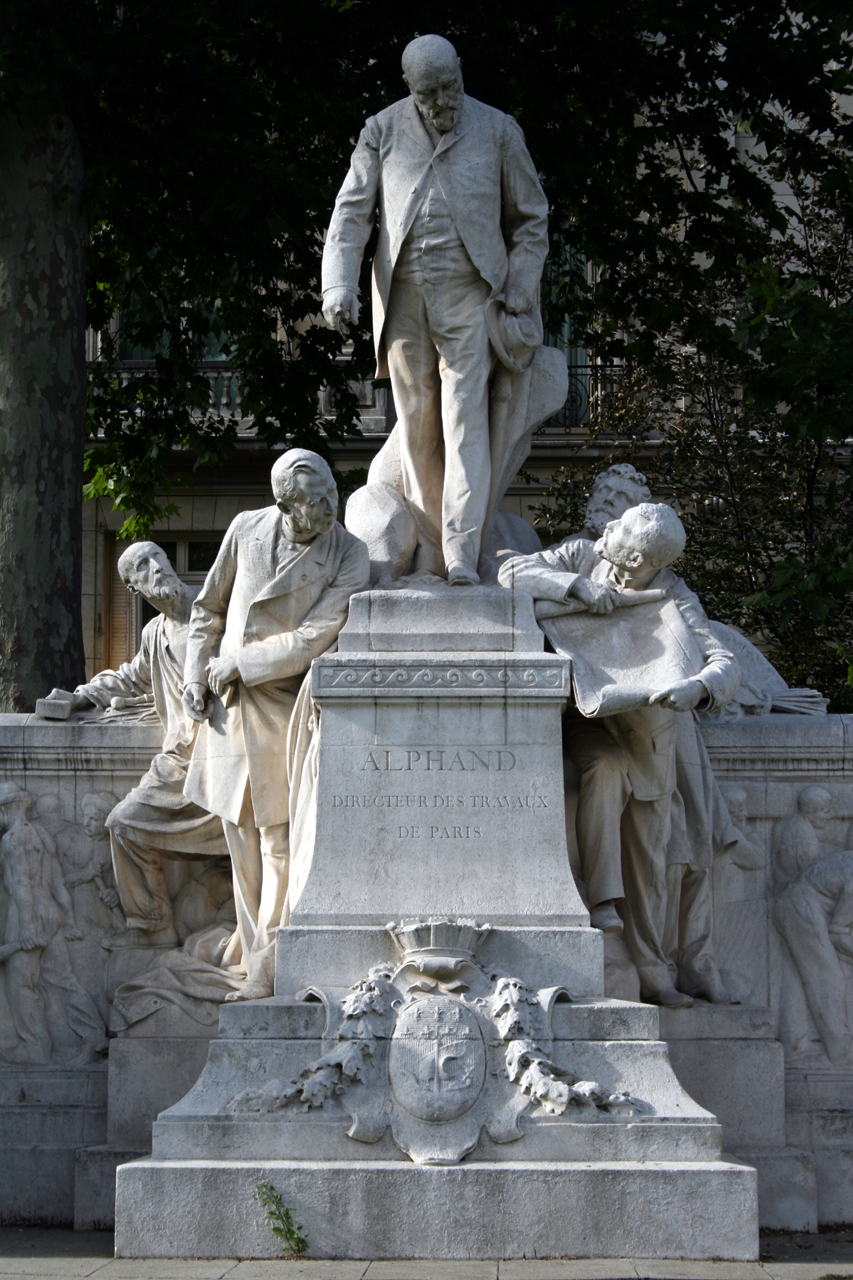
Monument to Alphand, Avenue Foch, Paris

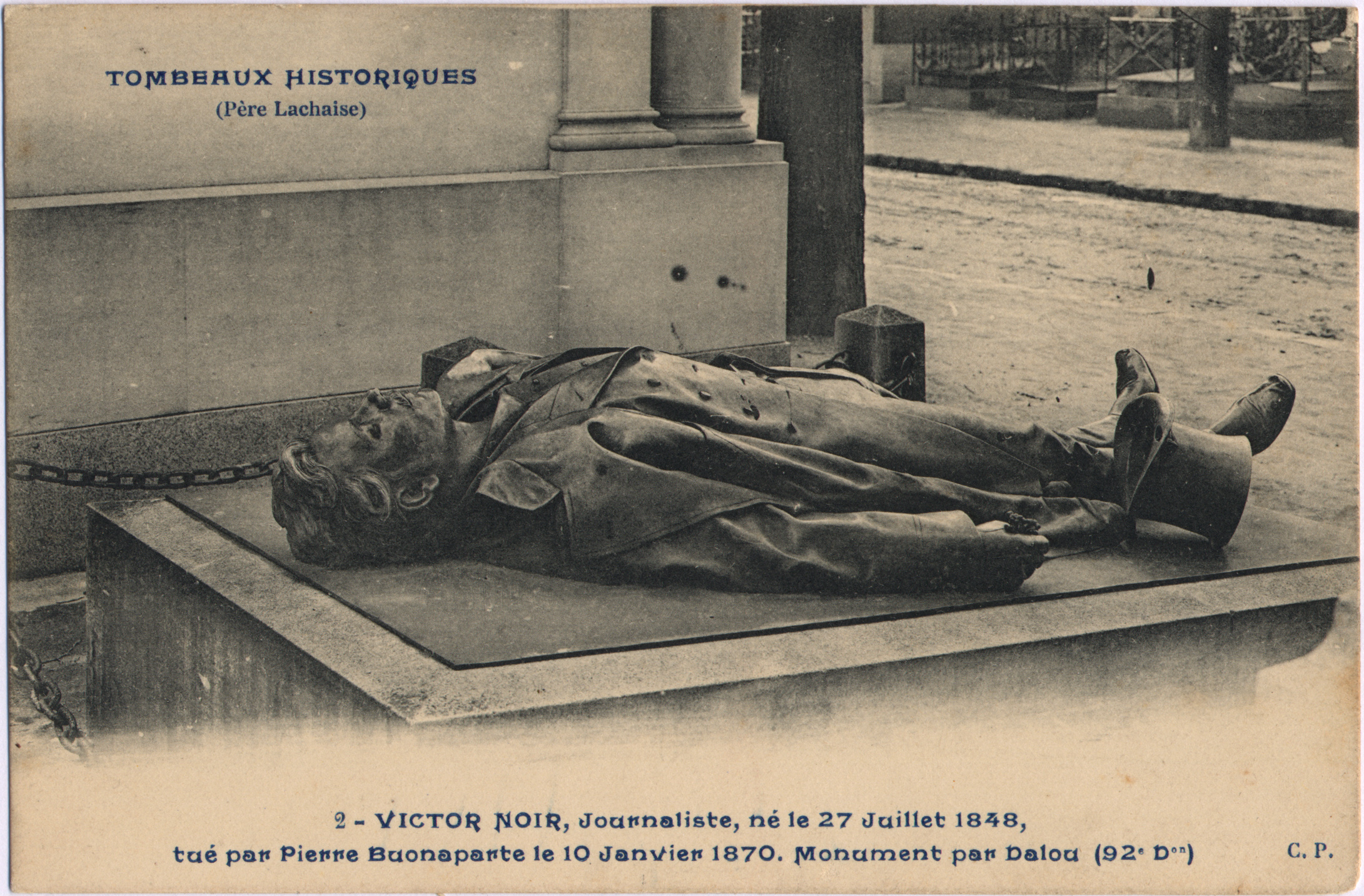
Victor Noir Tomb, Père Lachaise Cemetery

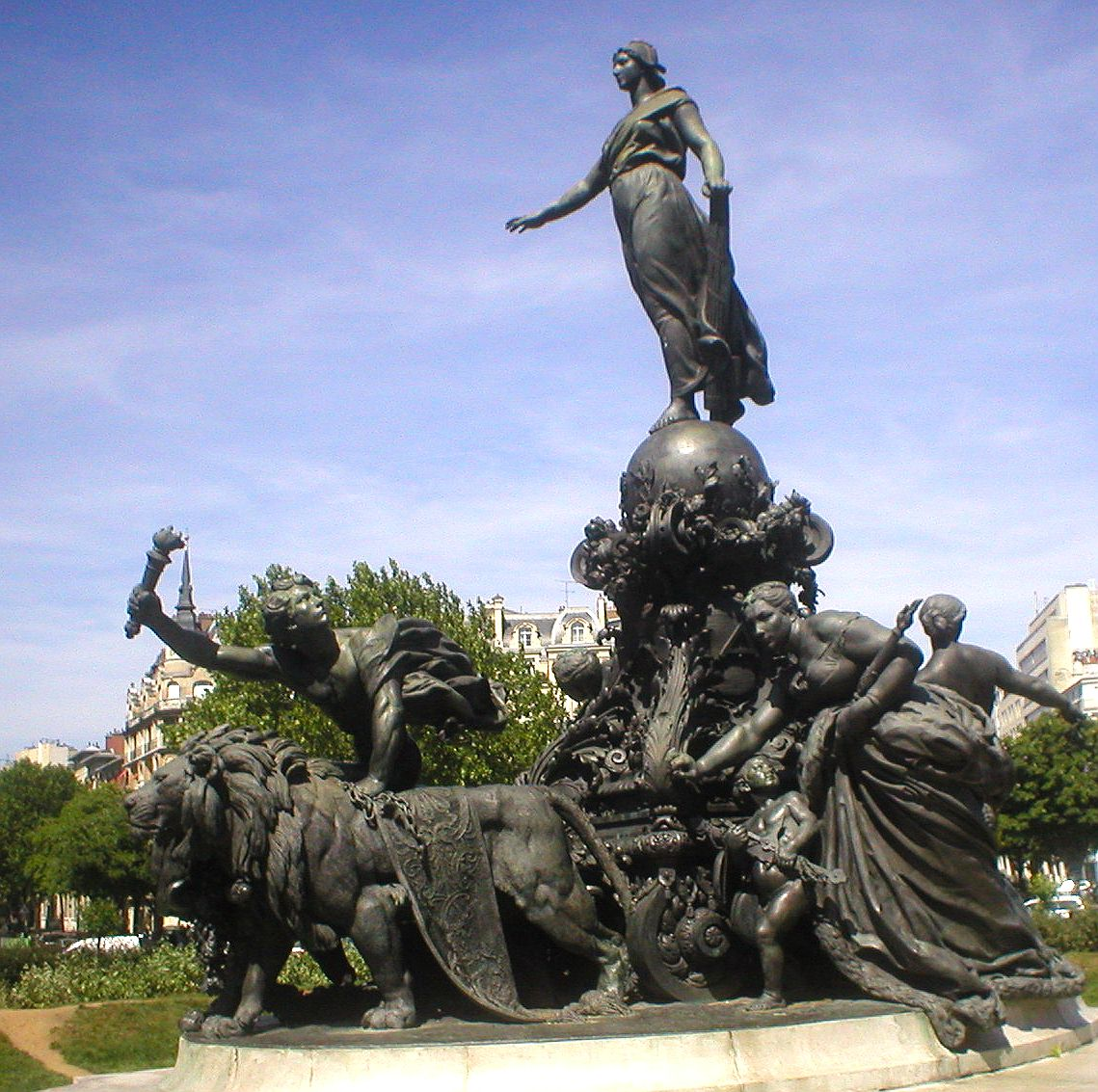
Triumph of the Republic, Place de la Nation, Paris

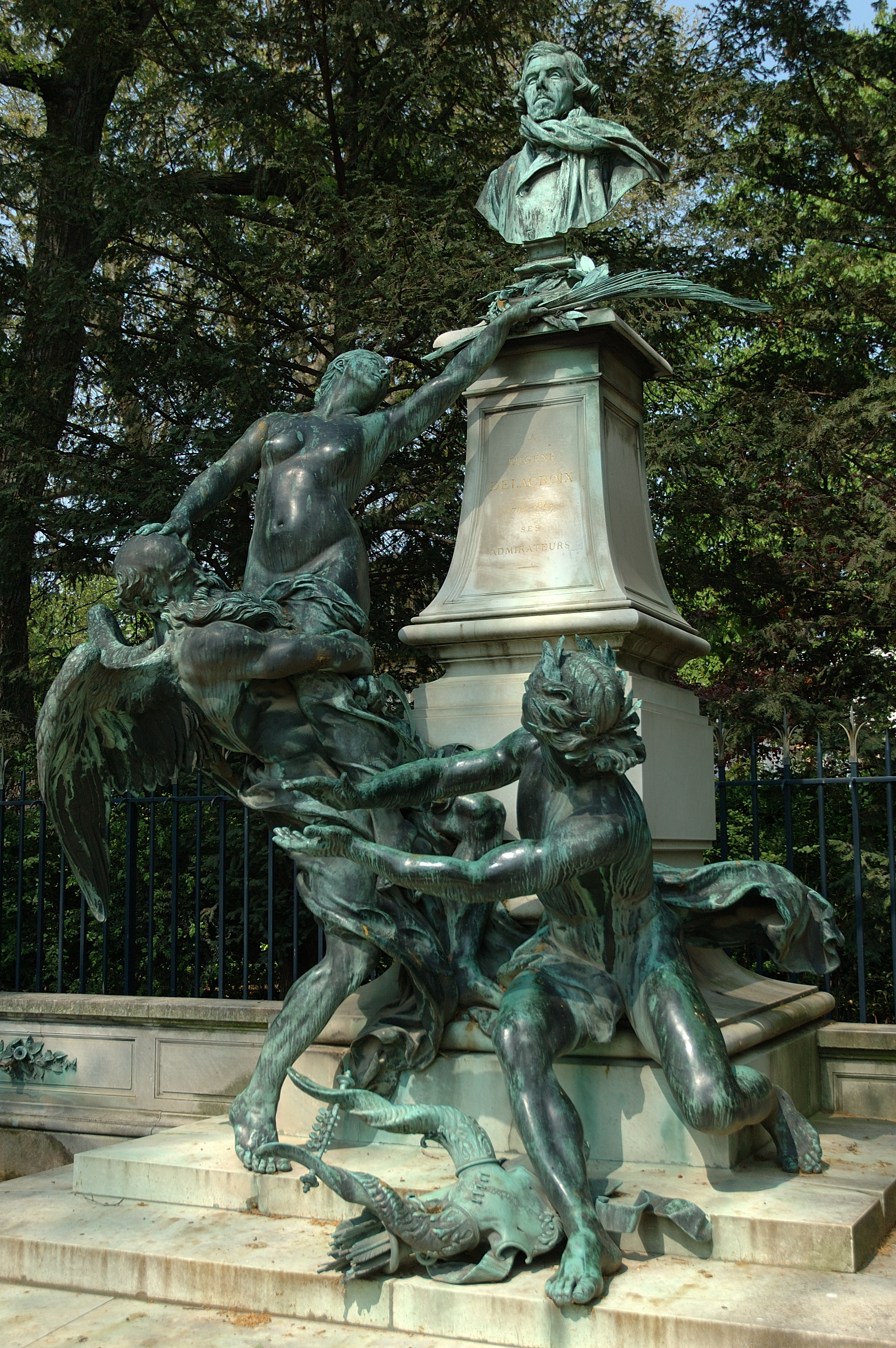
Monument to Delacroix, Luxembourg Garden, Paris

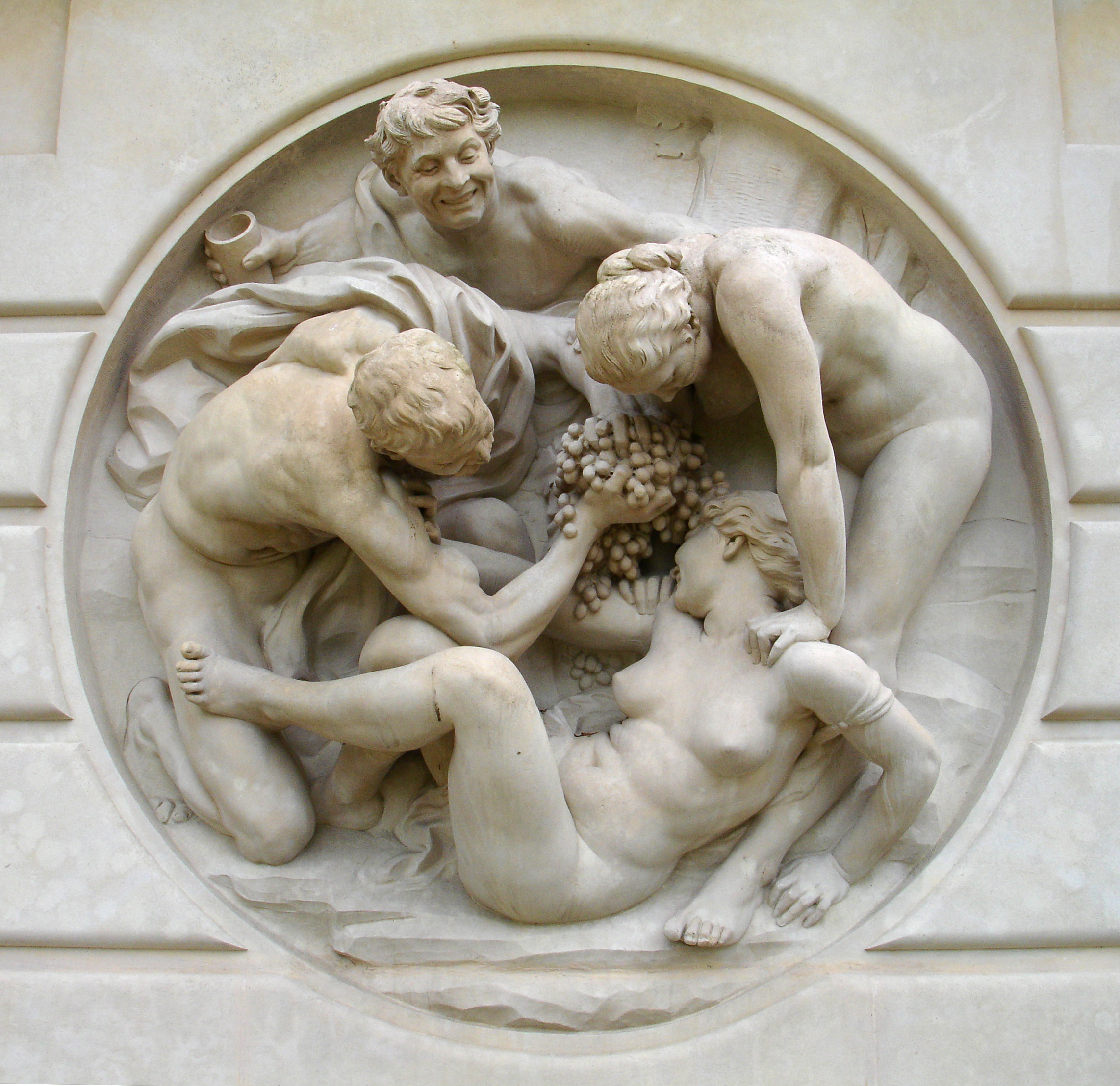
Bacchanale, Jardin des Serres d'Auteuil, Paris

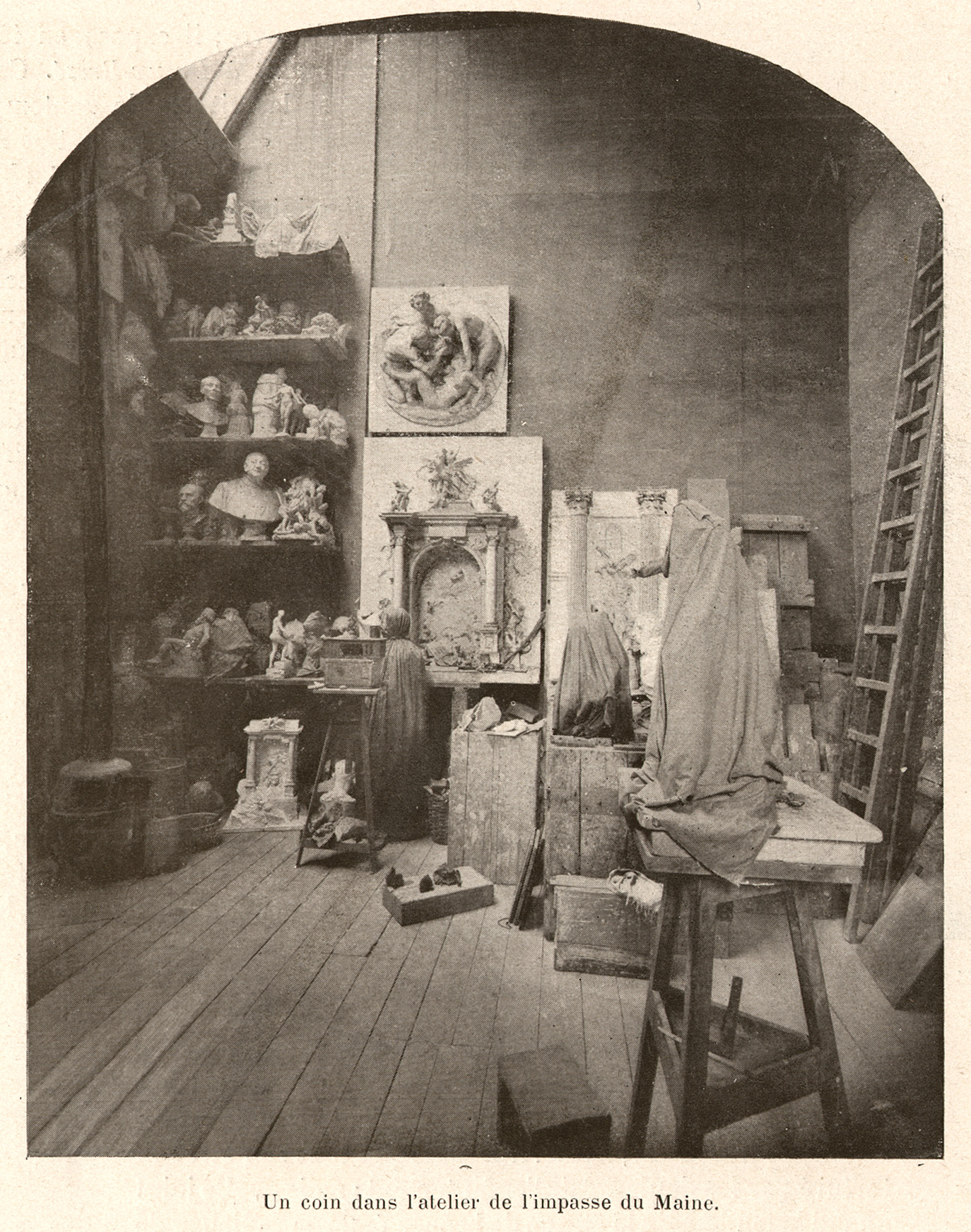
Dalou's studio in 1899

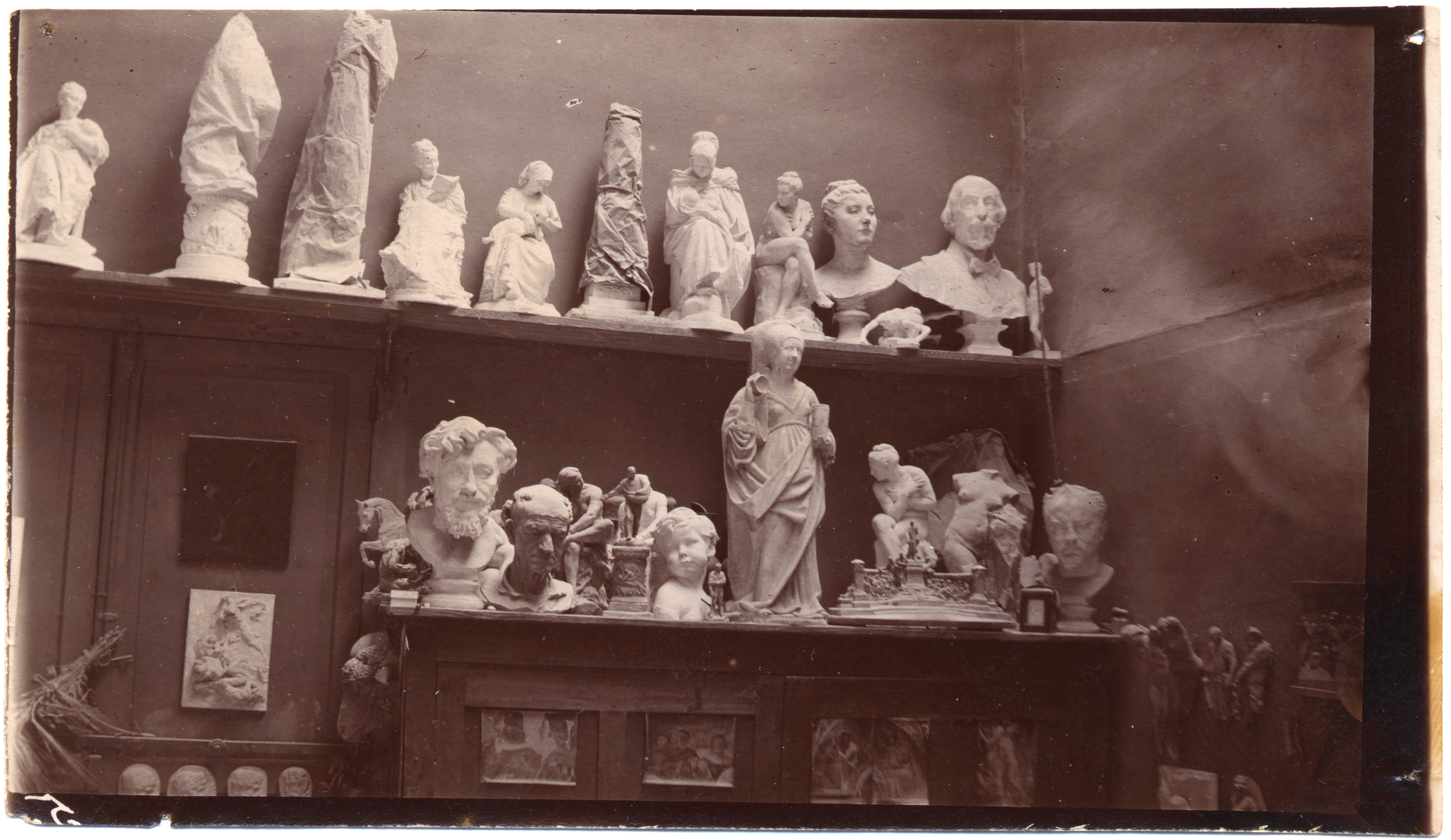
Dalou's studio c. 1902–1905

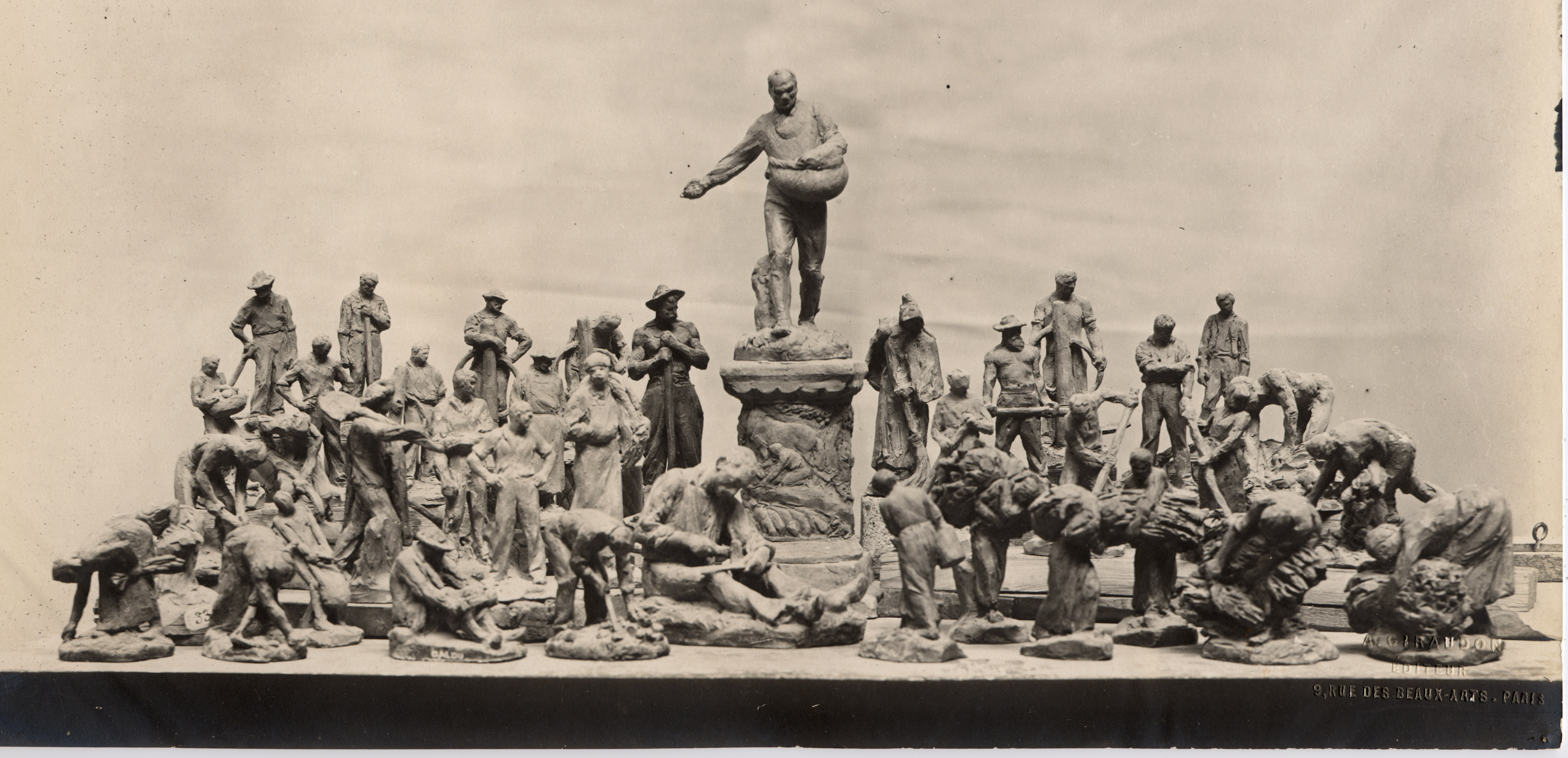
Sketches for the Monument to Labour, Petit Palais

== See also ==
- New Sculpture
