= Elsie Finnimore Buckley =

English writer and translator (1882–1959)

- Born: 1 August 1882; Calcutta, British India
- Died: 6 June 1959 (aged 76); Depwade, Norfolk, England
- Occupations: Writer and translator

Elsie Finnimore Buckley (1 August 1882 – 6 June 1959) was an English writer and translator.

Buckley was born in Calcutta, the daughter of Robert Burton Buckley, a civil engineer, and Ada Marian Sarah Finnimore. She was educated at Girton College, Cambridge. In March 1899, at age 16, Buckley won a gold medal in the Société Nationale des Professeurs de Français en Angleterre's annual French language and literature competition. She married the writer Anthony Ludovici on 20 March 1920, and they first lived at 35 Central Hill, Upper Norwood in South London.

In Children of the Dawn, Old Tales of Greece (1909), it is noted that the writer possesses a terse simplicity of style, and that the book is an "almost inexhaustible treasure-house of the ancient Greek tales". However, because the book was considered to be on a serious topic, a reviewer at the time said: "The plain truth is that this is not woman's work, and a woman has neither the knowledge nor the literary tact necessary for it."

Essays from her book of Greek tales for children, Children of the Dawn, have appeared in other collections aimed at the younger audience. The tales are still included in bibliographies of books on ancient cultures for young readers.

== Works ==
- Children of the dawn: old tales of Greece, 1909. Read online
- (tr.) The century of the renaissance by Louis Batiffol. 1916.According to WorldCat, the book is held in 687 libraries Open Library entry
- (tr.) The earliest times by Frantz Funck-Brentano. 1927. Borrow ebook from Open Library
- (tr.) The third republic by Raymond Recouly. 1928. Open Library Entry
- (tr.) The restoration and the July monarchy by Jean Lucas-Dubreton. 1929. Open Library entry
- (tr.) The second republic and Napoleon III by René Arnaud. 1930.
- (tr.) Charlotte Corday by Michel Corday. 1931.
- (tr.) The consulate and the empire, 1789-1809 by Louis Madelin. Open Library entry
- (tr.) Luther by Frantz Funck-Brentano. 1936.
- (tr.) The consulate and the empire by Louis Madelin. 1937.
