= Delacroix Monument =

Monument in the Jardin du Luxembourg

Monument to Delacroix
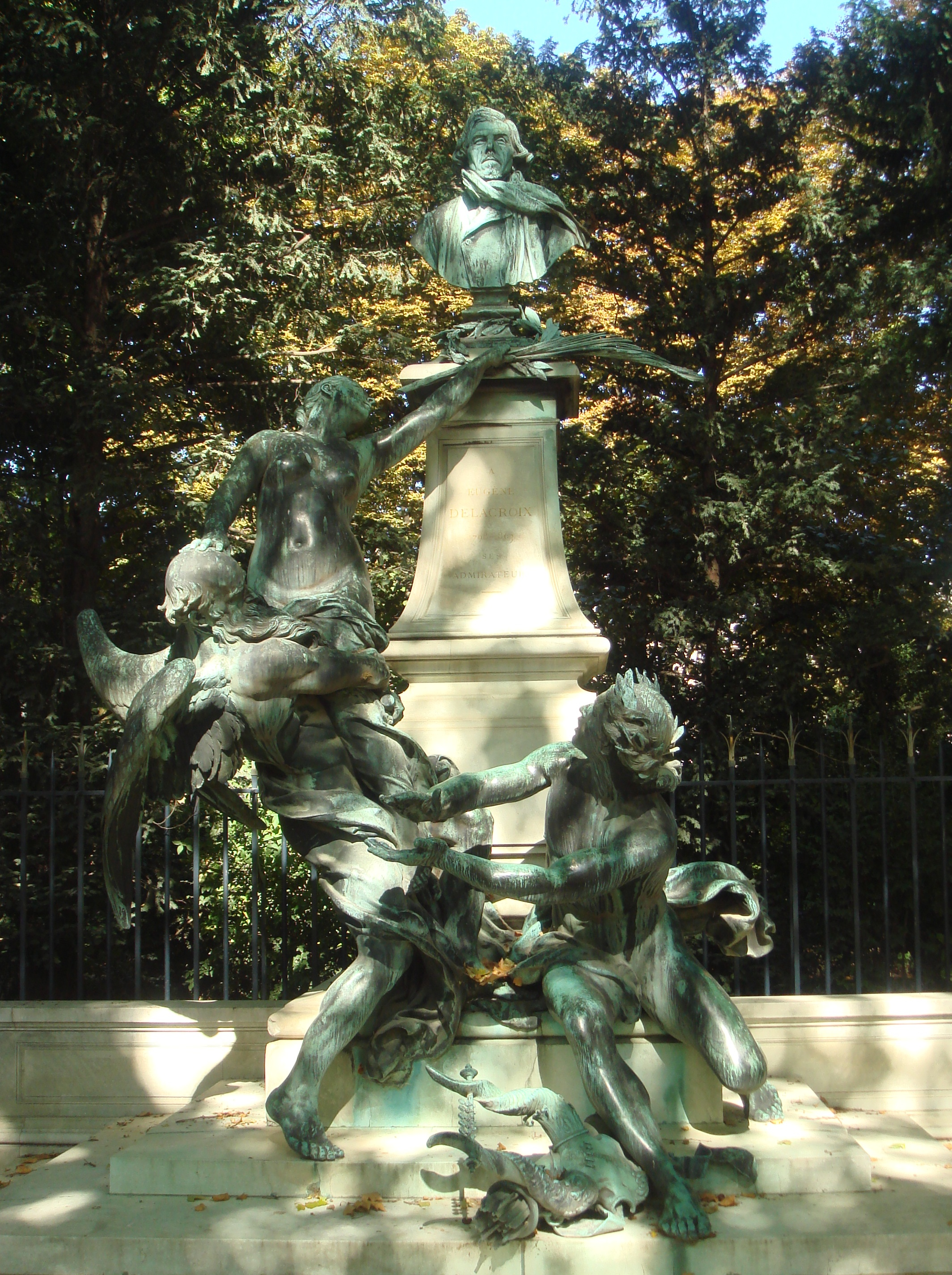
- Material: Bronze
- Dedicated date: 1890

The Delacroix Monument (French: Monument à Delacroix) is a memorial to the French artist Eugène Delacroix (1798-1863). It is located in the Jardin du Luxembourg, in Paris, France, on the north side of the garden, just east of the Orangerie du Sénat. It was created by the French sculptor Aimé-Jules Dalou and unveiled in 1890.

== History ==
In 1884, a group of leading artists, critics, writers and politicians proposed the creation of a monument that would honor Delacroix. To create the monument, they chose the well-known French sculptor Aimé-Jules Dalou.

== Description ==
The monument is an allegorical display of four figures. At the bottom Apollo, God of Poetry and Music, applauds as a winged old man, representing Time, lifts up a woman, representing Fame, to present a wreath of renown and immortality to the fourth figure, Delacroix.
