= Oscar Levy =

German physician, writer and journalist (1867–1946)

- Born: 28 March 1867; Stargard, Prussia
- Died: 13 August 1946 (aged 79); Oxford, England
- Occupations: Translator, Philosopher
- Known for: Scholar of Nietzsche
- Spouse: Frieda Brauer
- Children: 1
- Family: Jim Rosenthal (grandson); Tom Rosenthal (great-grandson)

Oscar Ludwig Levy (28 March 1867 – 13 August 1946) was a German Jewish physician and writer, now known as a scholar of Friedrich Nietzsche, whose works he first saw translated systematically into English. His was a paradoxical life, of self-exile and exile, and of writing on and (as often taken) against Judaism. He was influenced by the racialist theories of Arthur de Gobineau. He also admired Benjamin Disraeli, two of whose novels he translated into the German language.

== Life and career ==
Levy was born in Stargard in the Province of Pomerania, the son of Ernestina (née Lewy) and Moritz Levy and the brother of Max Levy (1869, Berlin - 1932) and Emil Elias Levy. He studied medicine in Freiburg, qualifying in 1891. He left the German Empire in 1894, where his father was a banker in Wiesbaden, and lived in the United Kingdom of Great Britain and Ireland.

He apparently discovered, or was more thoroughly converted to, Nietzsche in 1905 or 1906 via a patient. The 18-volume Nietzsche translation he oversaw appeared from 1909 to 1913. His collaborators were Francis Bickley, Paul V. Cohn, Thomas Common, William S. Haussman, J.M. Kennedy, Anthony Ludovici, Maximilian A. Mugge, Maude D. Petre, Horace B. Samuel, Hermann Georg Scheffauer, G.T. Wrench and Helen Zimmern. Ludovici became his most important follower. In general he found little British support, but A.R. Orage was an enthusiast and Levy found an outlet in The New Age.

Subsequently, his life was complicated by having to leave the United Kingdom and his medical practice despite his support for the British side against the Central Powers when World War I broke out. He went back to the German Empire in 1915 and then to Switzerland. Back in the United Kingdom in 1920, he incautiously wrote a preface for an inflammatory political pamphlet by George Pitt-Rivers, The World Significance of the Russian Revolution. He was deported as an alien in 1921. He then lived in the French Third Republic.

Eventually he returned to the United Kingdom. He died in Oxford. He was married to Frieda Brauer. His daughter Maud lived in Oxford, having married the bookseller Albi Rosenthal. His grandson is television sports presenter Jim Rosenthal and his great-grandson is actor Tom Rosenthal.

In 2004, his papers were deposited in the Nietzsche-Haus in Sils Maria.

== Works ==
- Levy, Oscar (1904), Das neunzehnte Jahrhundert , translated into English by Leonard A. Magnus as The Revival of Aristocracy (Probsthain & Co., 1906)
- Disraeli, Benjamin (1909), Contarini Fleming, ein psychologischer roman (in German), translated by Levy, Oscar, Berlin: Oesterheld
- Levy, Oscar, ed. (1909–1913), The complete works of Friedrich Nietzsche. The first complete and authorized English translation, vol. 18 vols., Edinburgh and London: T. N. Foulis
  - NB volume order differs between versions
  - The Birth of Tragedy, translated by Haussmann, Wm. A., 1909
  - Early Greek Philosophy, translated by Mügge, Maximilian A., 1911
  - On the future of our educational institutions. Homer and classical philology, translated by Kennedy, J.M., 1910
  - Thoughts out of Season (Part I), translated by Ludovici, Anthony A., 1910
  - Thoughts out of Season (Part II), translated by Collins, Adrian, 1910
  - Human, All-Too-Human (Part I), translated by Zimmern, Heinz, 1911
  - Human, All-Too-Human (Part II), translated by Cohn, Paul V., 1909
  - The Case of Wagner, translated by Ludovici, Anthony A., 1911
  - The Dawn of Day, translated by Kennedy, J.M., 1911
  - The Joyful Wisdom ("La Gaya Scienza"), translated by Common, Thomas, 1910 , poetry rendered by Paul V. Cohn and Maude D. Petre
  - This Spake Zarathustra, translated by Common, Thomas, 1909
  - Beyond Good and Evil, translated by Zimmern, Helen, 1909
  - The Genealogy of Morals / Peoples and Countries, translated by Samuel, Horace B., 1913
  - The Will to Power (Vol.1, Books 1 and 2), translated by Ludovici, Anthony A., 1909
  - The Will to Power (Vol.2, Books 3 and 4), translated by Ludovici, Anthony A., 1910
  - The Twilight of the Idols, translated by Ludovici, Anthony A., 1911
  - Ecce Homo, translated by Ludovici, Anthony A., 1911
  - Guppy, Robert, ed. (1913), Index to Nietzsche
- Levy, Oscar, ed. (1913), Selected letters of Friedrich Nietzsche, translated by Ludovici, Anthony
- Levy, Oscar, My Battle for Nietzsche in England
- Levy, Oscar, Nietzsche verstehen. Essays aus dem Exil 1913-1937
- Levy, Oscar (1940), The Idiocy of Idealism, London: W. Hodge
- Levy, Oscar (1952), "Nietzsche", Encyclopædia Britannica , replacing the shorter article by F. C. S. Schiller in the 1911 edition.

Levy also wrote an introduction to On the tracks of life: the immorality of morality (1909) by Leone Gioacchino Sera, translated by J. M. Kennedy.
