= Jean Lucas-Dubreton =

French historian and biographer

Jean-Marie Lucas de Peslouan, better known by his pseudonym Jean Lucas-Dubreton (23 September 1883 – 9 September 1972) was a French historian and biographer.

He was born in Grenoble. He died in Triel-sur-Seine.

As a graduate of the Faculty of Political Science and a doctor of law, he was honorary member of the Conseil d'État. He was also a contributor to the magazines "Revue des deux mondes", "Revue de Paris" and "Le Crapouillot".

Jean Lucas-Dubreton has won four important literary prizes of the Académie française, including the Broquette-Gonin Prize (literature) for "Madrid" in 1963.

He was a cousin of the writer Maurice Barrès (1862–1923).

== Works ==
- Samuel Pepys: a portrait in miniature, London: A. M. Philpot, 1922. Translated by H. J. Stenning.
- The restoration and the July monarchy. New York: G.P. Putnam's Sons. Translated by E. F. Buckley.
- The Borgias, 1954. Santa Clara, Calif., Peterson Engineering Co. Translated by Philip John Stead.
- Daily life in Florence in the time of the Medici, London: Allen & Unwin, 1960. Translated by A. Lytton Sells.
