= Albert Ludovici Sr. =

German painter (1820–1894)

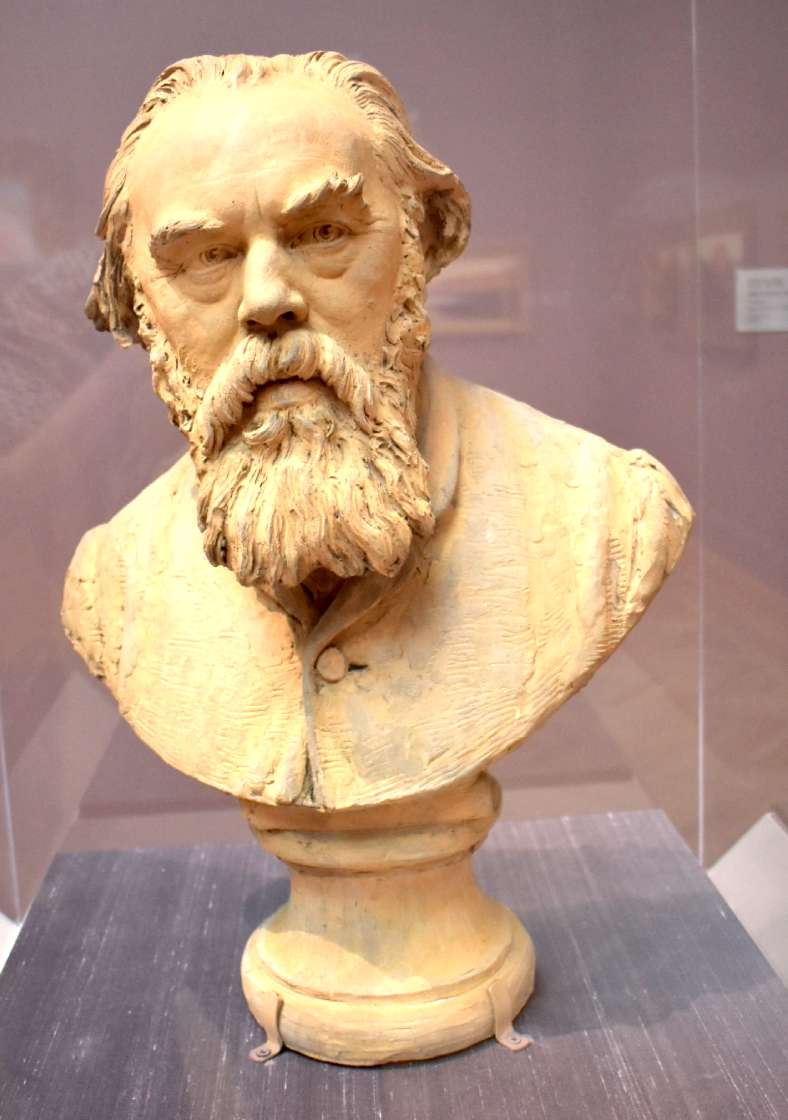
- Bust of Albert Ludovici by Aimé-Jules Dalou at the Palace of the Legion of Honor in San Francisco
- Born: 3 September 1820; Zittau, Germany
- Died: 1 September 1894 (aged 73); Vevey, Switzerland
- Spouse: Caroline Grenier (m. 1850)
- Children: 5
- Parents: Johann August Ludovici (father); Henriette Amilie (née Wölher) (mother)

Albert Johann Ludovici (3 September 1820 – September 1894) was a German and British artist, known for exhibiting at the Royal Society of British Artists.

== Life ==
Ludovici was born on 3 September 1820, in Zittau. He was the son of Henriette Amilie (née Wölher 1795–1826) and Johann August Ludovici, (1789–1872). After living in Chemnitz until 1843, he moved to Paris, where he studied at the "Atelier Drölling" and was a contemporary of the well-known artist Jean-Jacques Henner.

Ludovici moved to England, and living in Margate, began a career as a painter. Within two years he had established himself as a successful portrait painter and was able to return to Paris in 1850 to marry Caroline Grenier (1822–1893) and bring her back to England with him. He moved to Mornington Rd, London, where they had five children. He became a British subject in 1871.

Ludovici had a long and established career, often exhibiting at the Royal Society of British Artists, where he was at one point treasurer. Included in the portraits he painted were King Edward VII and Queen Alexandra. Ludovici's friend, the sculptor Jules Dalou presented him and his family with a terracotta bust of Ludovici in gratitude for their help after Dalou left Paris and stayed with the Ludovici family in London. Albert Ludovici died in Vevey, Switzerland in September 1894.

Two of Albert's children became artists, his eldest son Albert Ludovici Jr. (1852–1932) and his second daughter Marguerite (Cathelin-Ludovici, 1856–1947). Albert Sr. was the Grandfather of Anthony M Ludovici, who although also a talented painter, chose writing as a career.
