= Tom Rosenthal (actor) =

English actor (born 1988)

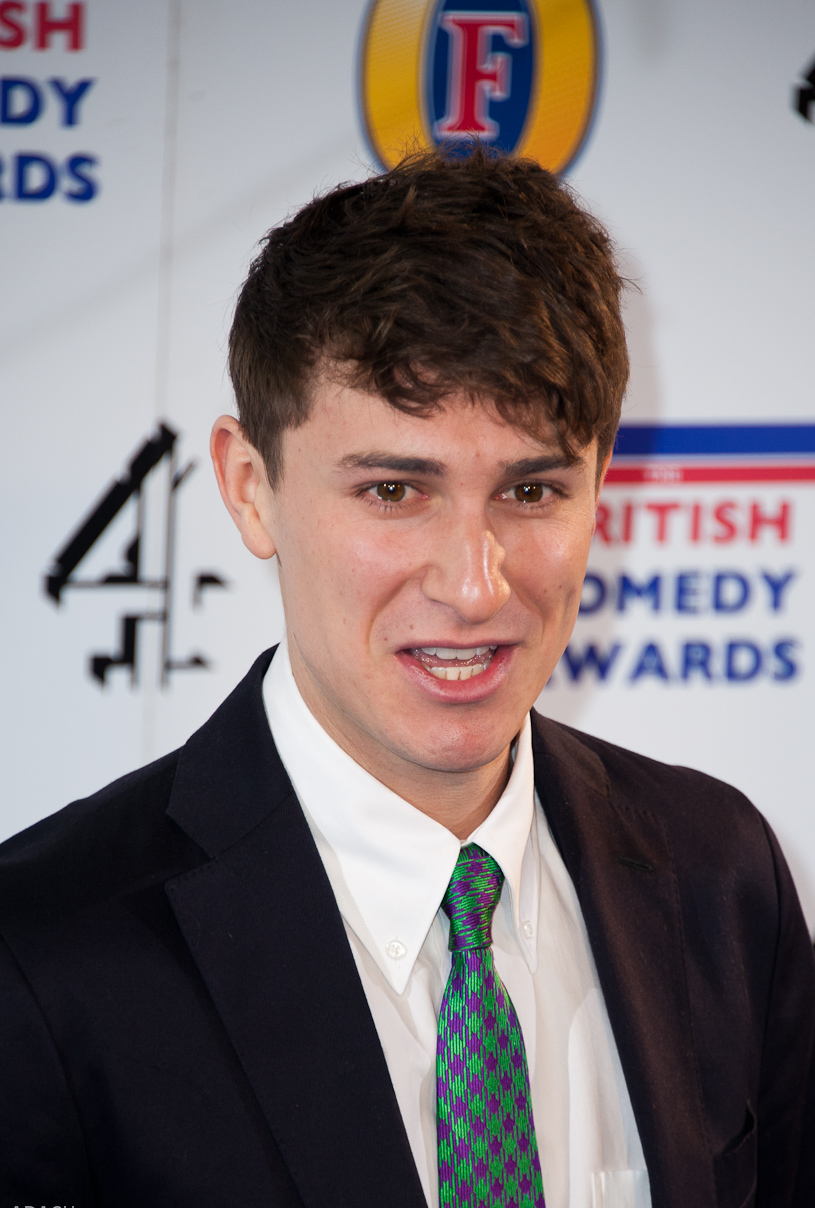
- Rosenthal at the 2013 British Comedy Awards
- Born: Thomas Alan Smith Rosenthal; 14 January 1988 (age 38); London, England
- Education: King's College London
- Partner: Gabrielle Sky
- Children: 1
- Relatives: Jim Rosenthal (father); Oscar Levy (great-grandfather)

Comedy career
- Years active: 2007–present
- Medium: Stand-up; television
- Website: tomrosenthal.net

Thomas Alan Smith Rosenthal (born 14 January 1988) is an English actor, comedian and writer. He is best known for his television roles as Jonny Goodman in Friday Night Dinner (2011–2020) and Marcus Gallo in Plebs (2013–2022). He has written and performed three stand-up comedy shows: Child of Privilege (2011), Благодаря (2013), and Manhood (2019–2020), the latter of which received critical acclaim at the 2019 Edinburgh Fringe Festival.

== Early life ==
Thomas Alan Smith Rosenthal was born in the Hammersmith area of London on 14 January 1988, the son of Newsnight producer Christine (née Smith) and television sports presenter Jim Rosenthal. He is of German-Jewish descent through his father, with one of his paternal great-grandfathers being German-Jewish physician and writer Oscar Levy. He was once dubbed a "super-smart child of privilege" by the London Evening Standard. He grew up in Cookham, Berkshire, and went to Reading Blue Coat School before studying philosophy at King's College London. His early comedic influences were the TV shows Spaced, Brass Eye, and Da Ali G Show.

== Career ==
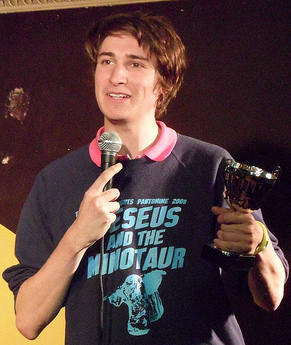
Rosenthal performing at the Edinburgh Festival Fringe in 2010

In 2011, Rosenthal was cast as Jonny Goodman in the Channel 4 sitcom Friday Night Dinner, alongside Simon Bird, Tamsin Greig, Paul Ritter, and Mark Heap. The sitcom focused on the weekly Shabbat dinner in the middle-class secular Jewish Goodman family in North London. Rosenthal played the younger son and he and Greig are the only two main cast members who have Jewish roots in real life. The sixth and final series set the record for the highest audience for any comedy on Channel 4 or E4 for 16-to-34 year olds with a 49.3% share, and the average audience for the series was 3.9 million viewers. Following the death of Ritter in 2021, it was announced that the show would not continue. To celebrate the 10th anniversary of the start of the show, an anniversary special was aired in May 2021.

In 2013, he was cast as Marcus in the ITV sitcom Plebs. The sitcom is a comedy set in Ancient Rome, following the main characters of Marcus, Stylax, and Grumio. In 2020, it was announced that a sixth series would not be commissioned and instead a feature-length special would be released.

In 2014, he created and starred in a comedy pilot for BBC iPlayer with Naz Osmanoglu, entitled Flat TV, which was later commissioned into a mini-series.

In 2015, he played a brief role as Gary Thorp in the ITV drama series Broadchurch.

In 2019, he played Private Pike in Dad's Army: The Lost Episodes, a recreation of three missing episodes of the BBC sitcom Dad's Army. That same year, his third stand-up show Manhood received critical acclaim at the Edinburgh Fringe Festival.

== Personal life ==
Rosenthal was in a relationship with TV and radio presenter, Vick Hope from 2013 to 2017. In September 2024 he announced he was expecting his first baby with his partner Gabrielle Sky. Their daughter, Simi Valentine, was born in February 2025. The couple announced their engagement in November 2025.

He is a fan of Arsenal F.C.

On the How Do You Cope? podcast in August 2025, he discussed how he copes with grief following he and his girlfriend suffering a miscarriage.

Rosenthal said of his Jewish roots in 2011, "I get called a Jewish comedian and I'm totally fine with that, but I can't really inform either of the performances I've done this year with a Jewish background. But I have learnt a lot about the culture and it has given me great pride to do so."

In 2019, Rosenthal began to speak out about his negative experience with circumcision and his opposition to it, as well as speaking about how the experience intersected with his struggles with obsessive–compulsive disorder. He stated, "The truth is that my parents were put in charge of my welfare and they did something to me that can never be remedied. [...] The last proper Jew in our family was four generations back. My dad was circumcised for medical reasons, which is another bloody rabbit hole because a lot of those cases are misdiagnosed. [...] The aim is to recognise that if this has happened to you and you feel fine about it, that's great. But if you don't feel fine, which I don't, then you're justified."

In 2025, Rosenthal was diagnosed with autism. He had previously said "I do clearly have quite a lot of the behavioral traits that people who are diagnosed as autistic do have", and that his friends believe him to be autistic. While taking part in BBC One show Pilgrimage, model Christine McGuinness, who is autistic and has three children with the same diagnosis, said to Rosenthal that she believed him to be autistic.

== Filmography ==
=== Television ===
Year	Title	Role	Notes
2013	Breathless	Sam Rothe	3 episodes
2014	Comedy Feeds	Tom	Episode: "Flat TV"
2015	Broadchurch	Gary Thorp	2 episodes
2015	Horrible Histories	Alfred the Great	Episode: "Awesome Alfred The Great"
2014–2016	Flat TV	Tom	5 episodes; also writer
2015–2017	Drunk History	Drunk Storyteller	4 episodes
2017	Absolutely Fine	Tom	9 episodes
2018	Roast Battle	Himself	Episode: #2.1
2019	The Crystal Maze	Himself	Episode: #9.2
2019	The One Show	Himself	2 episodes
2013–2019	Sunday Brunch	Himself	5 episodes
2016–2019	Thunderbirds Are Go	Brandon Berrenger (voice)	2 episodes
2019	Dad's Army: The Lost Episodes	Private Pike	3 episodes
2013–2019	Plebs	Marcus	38 episodes
2011–2020	Friday Night Dinner	Jonny Goodman	37 episodes
2020	Ibiza Weekender	Narrator	10 episodes
2022	The Weakest Link	Himself	New Year's Eve Special
2021–2022	Richard Osman's House of Games	Himself	10 episodes
2022	Red Rose	Douglas Sensei	Episode: "Manchester Innit"
2022-2023	Lloyd of the Flies	Lloyd B. Fly (voice)	52 episodes
2022	Plebs: Soldiers of Rome	Marcus	Television film
2023	Pointless Celebrities	Himself	Episode: #16.6
2023	Banged Up: Stars Behind Bars	Himself	4 episodes
2023	Steph's Packed Lunch	Himself	Episode: #4.51
2023	Adventures of ArachnoFly	ArachnoFly	16 episodes
2025	Pilgrimage: The Road Through North Wales	Himself	3 episodes

=== Film ===
Year	Title	Role	Notes
2013	Scar Tissue	Mike Hunt	
2014	Benny & Jolene	Tommy	
2016	Bridget Jones's Baby	Josh	
2016	Elderflower	Felix	Short film
2018	Under The Weather	Edward Cirrus (voice)	Short film; also writer
2020	Settlers	Ian	Short film
2023	Operation Fortune: Ruse de Guerre	Trent	

== Stand-up comedy shows ==
Year	Title	Notes
2011	Child of Privilege	Written and Performed by Rosenthal
2013	Благодаря	Written and Performed by Rosenthal
2019–2020	Manhood	Written and Performed by Rosenthal

== Achievements ==
- Chortle Student Comedian of the Year Finalist 2009
- Nominated for a British Comedy Award as Best Breakthrough Act of 2011
- Leicester Mercury Comedian of the Year (Joint winner with Ben Target) 2011
