= Ludwig Rosenthal =

German bookseller (1840–1928)

Ludwig Rosenthal .jpg

Ludwig Rosenthal (2 July 1840, Fellheim, Bavaria - 23 December 1928, Munich) was a German antiquarian bookseller. His father, Joseph Rosenthal, was a lover of old books and odd bric-a-brac. Rosenthal apprenticed in Ellwangen, Baden-Württemberg before opening his business in Fellheim. In 1868, he moved to Munich and established himself at 16 Hildegardstrasse, almost immediately behind the Bavarian National Museum.

== Biography ==
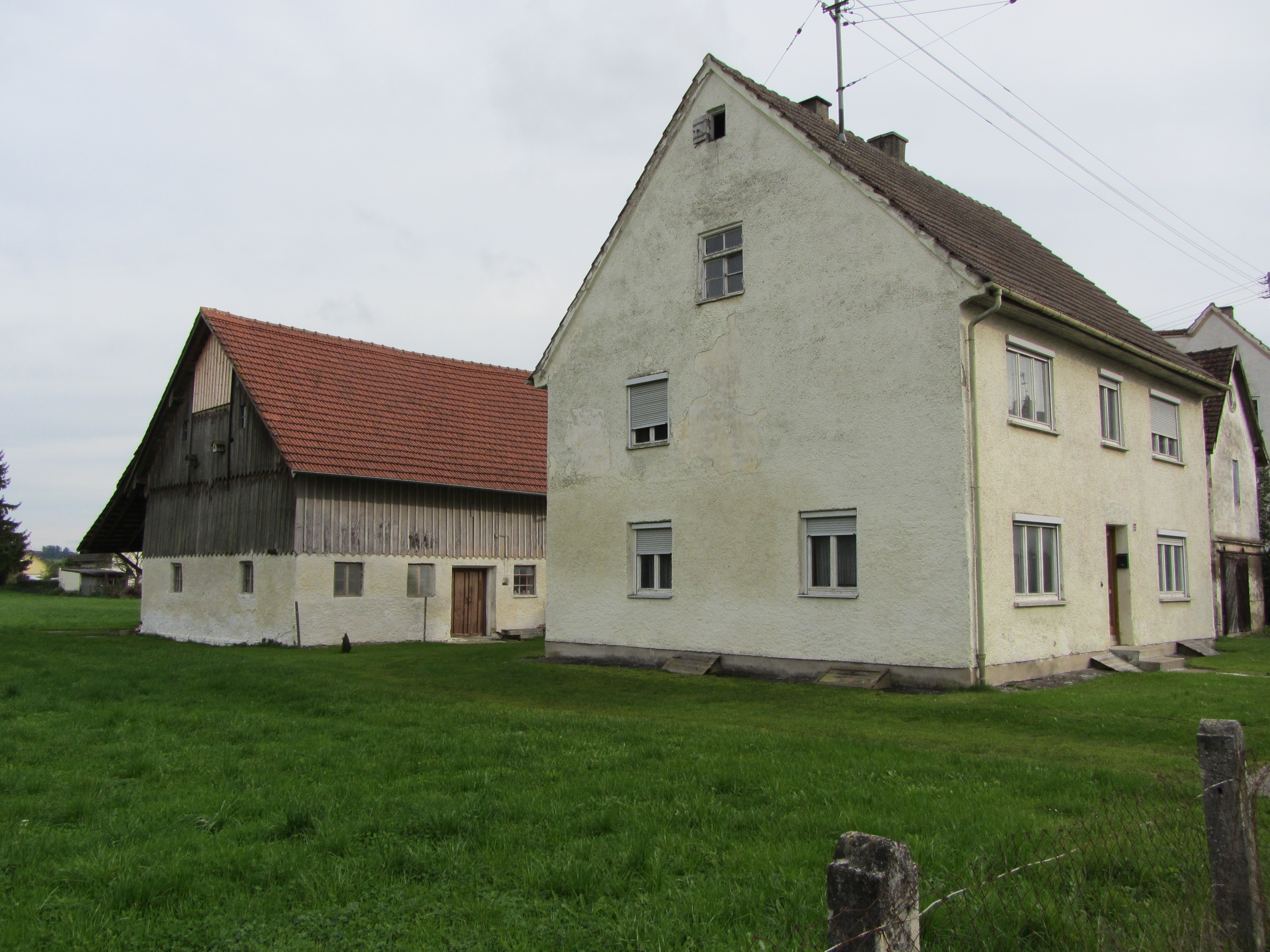
Birthplace of Rosenthal's mother, Dorlene Bacharach, in Fellheim

Rosenthal was the eldest son of the market trader Joseph Rosenthal, who ran an art and antiques shop in Fellheim. His mother Dorlene, née Bacharach, was born into a Jewish family of butchers from Fellheim. Rosenthal's three siblings were Jette, Nathan and Jacob, who later, changed his name to Jacques. He grew up in the town's Jewish community and attended the Jewish-Christian school. At the age of thirteen, he transferred to the Buxheim Charterhouse. After training as a bookseller with Isaak Hess in Ellwangen, (Note: "Dorlene's father, Samuel, had a sister, Jendle, who was married to Isaak Hess of Ellwangen (1789-1866)") Rosenthal opened his own art and antiques trade in 1859 in Fellheim.

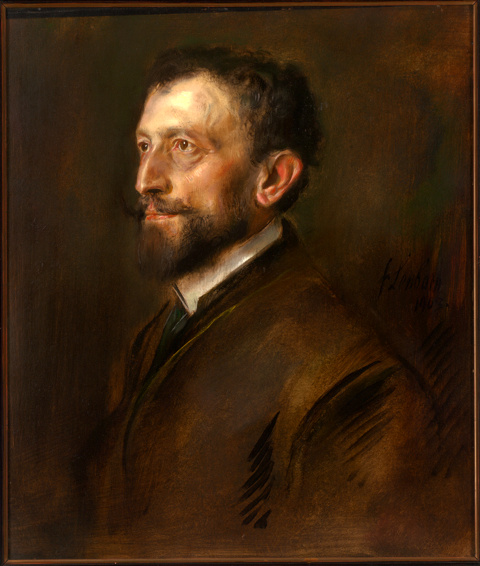
Jacques Rosenthal

In 1867, the Rosenthal family moved to Munich where Rosenthal and his brother Jacob (Jacques) founded "Rosenthal Antiquarian". In the holdings, there was a map of the circumnavigation of Magellan from the year 1523. Rosenthal acquired books from various libraries, including the library of St. Vitus' Abbey on the Rott, the city library of Leutkirch im Allgäu, the library of the family Hoermann of Gutenberg, the library of the Jesuit College at Landsberg am Lech, the library of Karl Maria von Aretin, parts of the library of Buxheim Charterhouse, and the library of the Lobris manor in Silesia. Around the turn of the century, Rosenthal's Antiquariat contained more than a million books, and was larger than the Bavarian State Library. In 1905, he appointed his three sons Adolf, Heinrich and Norbert Rosenthal as his partners. Rosenthal published many important catalogues and trained major dealers such as Martin Breslauer, Maurice Ettinghausen and Emil Hirsch. He died in 1928.

== Nazi persecution of family ==
When Hitler came to power in Germany in 1933 Rosenthal's children were persecuted because they were Jewish. His daughter Lina Rosenthal was killed by Nazis in Theresienstadt as were his sons Abraham Adolf Rosenthal and Nathan Norbert Rosenthal. Heinrich Hugo Rosenthal was able to migrate to the United States.

== Legacy ==
The Rosenthal family operates the family's antique book and music business in the Netherlands (which specializes in Incunabula, early printed books, Hebraica, Humanism, illustrated books, and prints), the United Kingdom, and in the United States.
