= Ecce Homo (book) =

1908 book by Friedrich Nietzsche

Ecce Homo: How One Becomes What One Is
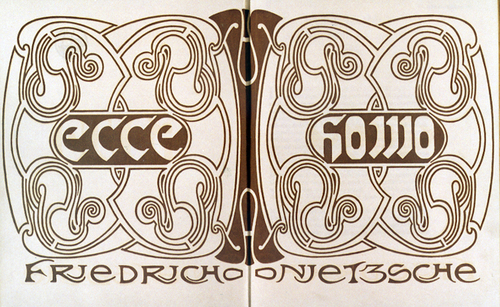
- Cover of the 1908 Insel edition designed by Henry van de Velde
- Author: Friedrich Nietzsche
- Original title: Ecce Homo: Wie man wird, was man ist
- Translator: R. J. Hollingdale
- Language: German
- Publication date: 1908
- Publication place: Germany
- Media type: Paperback, hardcover
- Pages: 144 (2005 Penguin Classics ed.)
- ISBN: 978-0140445152 (2005 Penguin Classics ed.)
- OCLC: 27449286
- LC Class: B3316.N54 A3413 1992
- Preceded by: The Antichrist
- Followed by: Nietzsche Contra Wagner

Ecce Homo: How One Becomes What One Is (German: Ecce homo: Wie man wird, was man ist) is the last original book written by philosopher Friedrich Nietzsche before his death in 1900. It was written in 1888 and was not published until 1908.

According to one of Nietzsche's most prominent English translators, Walter Kaufmann, the book offers "Nietzsche's own interpretation of his development, his works, and his significance." The book contains several chapters with self-laudatory titles, such as "Why I Am So Wise", "Why I Am So Clever", "Why I Write Such Good Books" and "Why I Am a Destiny". Kaufmann's Nietzsche: Philosopher, Psychologist, Antichrist notes the internal parallels, in form and language, to Plato's Apology which documented the Trial of Socrates. In effect, Nietzsche was putting himself on trial with this work, and his sardonic judgments and chapter headings can be seen as mordant, mocking, self-deprecating, or sly.

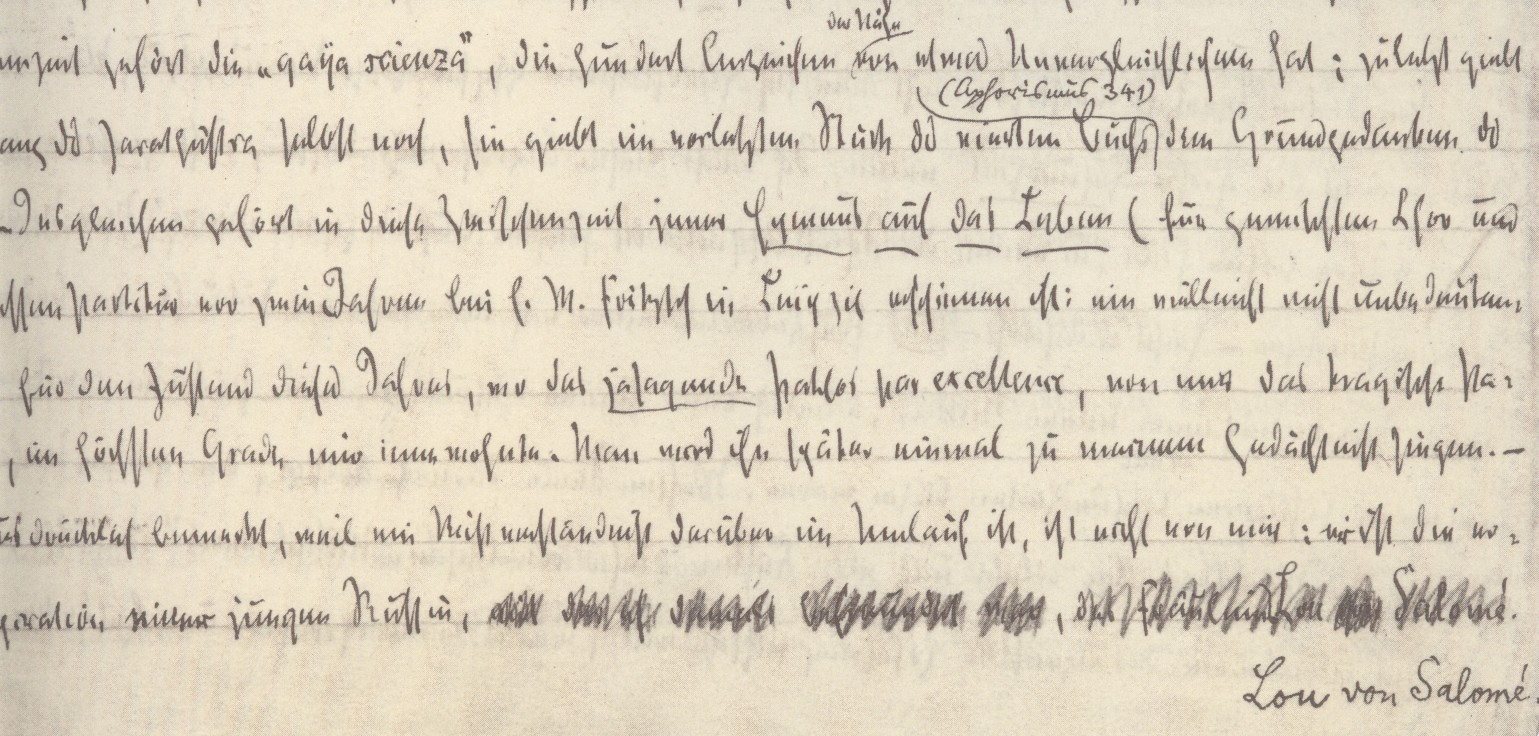
Peter Gast would "correct" Nietzsche's writings even after the philosopher's breakdown and would do so without his approval – something heavily criticized by today's Nietzsche scholarship.

Within this work, Nietzsche is self-consciously striving to present a new image of the philosopher and of himself, for example, a philosopher "who is not an Alexandrian academic nor an Apollonian sage, but Dionysian." On these grounds, Kaufmann considers Ecce Homo a literary work comparable in its artistry to Vincent van Gogh's paintings. Nietzsche argues that he is a great philosopher because of his withering assessment of the pious fraud of the entirety of philosophy which he considered as a retreat from honesty when most necessary, and a cowardly failure to pursue its stated aim to its reasonable end. Nietzsche insists that his suffering is not noble but the expected result of hard inquiry into the deepest recesses of human self-deception, and that by overcoming one's agonies a person achieves more than any relaxation or accommodation to intellectual difficulties or literal threats. He proclaims the ultimate value of everything that has happened to him (including his father's early death and his near-blindness – an example of love of fate or amor fati). Nietzsche's primary point is that to be "a man" alone is to be actually more than "a Christ".

One of the main purposes of Ecce Homo was to offer Nietzsche's own perspective on his work as a philosopher and human being. He wrote: "Under these circumstances I have a duty against which my habits, even more the pride of my instincts, revolt at bottom – namely, to say: Hear me! For I am such and such a person. Above all, do not mistake me for someone else!" Throughout the course of the book, he expounds — in the characteristically hyperbolic style found in his later period (1886–1888) — upon his life as a child, his tastes as an individual, and his vision for humanity. He gives reviews and insights about his various works, including: The Birth of Tragedy, The Untimely Meditations, Human, All Too Human, The Dawn, The Gay Science, Thus Spoke Zarathustra, Beyond Good and Evil, On the Genealogy of Morality, Twilight of the Idols and The Case of Wagner. The last chapter of Ecce Homo, entitled "Why I Am a Destiny", is primarily concerned with reiterating Nietzsche's thoughts on Christianity, corroborating Christianity's decadence and his ideas as to uncovering Christian morality.

He signs the book "Dionysus versus the Crucified."

== Bibliography ==
- Andreas Urs Sommer, Kommentar zu Nietzsches Der Antichrist. Ecce homo. Dionysos-Dithyramben. Nietzsche contra Wagner (= Heidelberger Akademie der Wissenschaften (Hg.): Historischer und kritischer Kommentar zu Friedrich Nietzsches Werken, vol. 6/2). XXI + 921 pages. Berlin / Boston: Walter de Gruyter 2013. (ISBN 978-3-11-029277-0) (the comprehensive standard commentary on "Ecce homo")
