= The Case of Wagner =

1888 essay by Friedrich Nietzsche

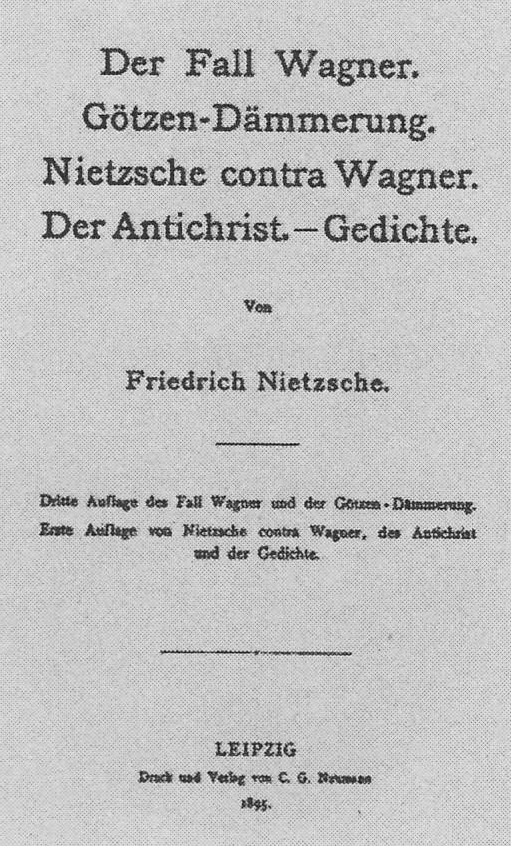
- Author: Friedrich Nietzsche
- Language: German
- Publication date: 1888
- Publication place: Germany
- Preceded by: The Genealogy of Morality (1887)
- Followed by: Twilight of the Idols (1888)

The Case of Wagner (German: Der Fall Wagner) is a book by the philosopher Friedrich Nietzsche, originally published in 1888. Subtitled "A Musician's Problem".

== Contents ==
The book is a critique of Richard Wagner and the announcement of Nietzsche's rupture with the German artist, who had involved himself too much, in Nietzsche's eyes, in the Völkisch movement and antisemitism. His music is no longer represented as a possible "philosophical effect," and Wagner is ironically compared to Georges Bizet, a French composer who gained fame during the Romantic Era. However, Nietzsche presents Wagner as only a particular symptom of a broader "disease" that is affecting Europe: that is, nihilism. The book shows Nietzsche as a capable music critic and provides the setting for some of his further reflections on the nature of art and its relationship to the future health of humanity.

This work is in sharp contrast with the second part of Nietzsche's The Birth of Tragedy, wherein he praised Wagner as fulfilling a need in music to go beyond the analytic and dispassionate understanding of music. Nietzsche also praised Wagner effusively in his essay "Wagner at Bayreuth" (part of the Untimely Meditations), but his disillusion with Wagner the composer and the man were first seen in his 1878 work Human, All Too Human. As Aaron Ridley writes in his book Nietzsche's The Case of Wagner and Nietzsche Contra Wagner, "He takes Wagner’s alleged miniaturism to mark a decline not merely in form, including rhythmic form, but also (and hence) in the material that occupies those ‘smallest spaces’ in which Wagner's real mastery is displayed." One of the last works that Nietzsche wrote returned to the critical theme of The Case of Wagner. In Nietzsche contra Wagner, Nietzsche pulled together excerpts from his works to show that he consistently had the same thoughts about music, only that he had misapplied them to Wagner in the earliest works. He considered Wagner's theatre to be a form of demolatry.

== Bibliography ==
- Andreas Urs Sommer: Kommentar zu Nietzsches Der Fall Wagner. Götzendämmerung (= Heidelberger Akademie der Wissenschaften (ed.): Historischer und kritischer Kommentar zu Friedrich Nietzsches Werken, vol. 6/1). XVII + 698 pages. Berlin / Boston: Walter de Gruyter 2012 (ISBN 978-3-11-028683-0).
- James Kennaway: Psychiatric Philosophy in Nietzsche's „Der Fall Wagner“ and „Nietzsche Contra Wagner“, in: New German Review. A Journal of Germanic Studies 20 (2004/05), pp. 84–95.
