= Holy Lie =

A Holy Lie is a philosophical concept coined by Friedrich Nietzsche in his late notes. It is also mentioned in his 1895 book The Antichrist.

== Concept ==
A holy lie, according to Friedrich Nietzsche, is the means by which priests and philosophers obtain the piety of their audiences.

The means he employs are as follows: he alone is all knowing; he alone is virtuous...

— The Will to Power, Book 2, Part 1, Note 139

Nietzsche argues that the purpose of human action is altered by the holy lie since the original moral standards of the general public is influenced by the moral standards preached by the priests and philosophers. Consequently, the human faculty of moral judgment based on the "beneficial" versus the "harmful" is in dysfunction. People who accept the holy lie do not evaluate the fairness of a thing by what Nietzsche calls "The natural notion". Instead, the notions, standards and doctrines preached by the preachers(priests and philosophers) substitutes the natural notion.

In this way, a conception of good and evil is created which appears to be entirely detached from the natural notions......In this way, the famous notion of "Conscience" is finally created. An inner voice which does not evaluate an act by its consequences, but by its intention and conformity of that intention to the "Law".

— The Will to Power, Book 2, Part 1, Note 141

In his book The Antichrist, Nietzsche further explains his idea with an example of Paul the Apostle and the downfall of the Roman Empire.
