= Immaculate perception =

Nietzschean philosophical concept

The expression immaculate perception, used by the German philosopher Friedrich Nietzsche in his text Thus Spoke Zarathustra; the term pertains to the idea of "pure knowledge." Nietzsche argues that "immaculate perception" is fictional because it ignores the intimate connection between the perceiver and the external world. He argues that humans are fallible and are capable of using data to ratify or refute perceptions. He also clarifies that perception is value-laden and can be ruled by our interests.

== Concept ==
The term was the title of one of Zarathustra's speeches, Von der unbefleckten Erkenntnis, which literally means "On Immaculate Knowledge" or "On Immaculate Cognition. Walter Kaufmann who translated it as "On Immaculate Perception"; other scholars also prefer this translation because the main metaphor in the passage is visual perception.

Nietzsche used immaculate perception in his interrogation of the myths of purity. According to the philosopher, perception is value-laden and ruled by interest; in particular, it denies the important role that the will and desires of the perceiver have on every perception.

Nietzsche also used immaculate perception in his discussions of the Christian view on sexuality. He attacked the so-called detachment of the "pure perceivers" or Rein-Erkennenden (e.g. Kantian view that pure judgments of what is beautiful must be detached), calling it voyeurism. According to him, loving the Earth from afar for these pure-knowers is hypocritical because they too are earthly but there is shame and bad conscience in this love.

== Applications ==
An example of the immaculate perception principle is Sigmund Freud's theory of mental representation, or what some also refer to "copy theory of perception". He proposed that perception, which he often used interchangeably with "external reality", is sensory-given and immediately known to the subject; therefore, it essentially involves the passive and temporary registration of an object. Nietzsche criticized this idea of "pure perception" by arguing that human perceptions are not mere copies of the images on the retinas. He maintained that perception is not clean or untainted by the object of perception. People "actively" construct perceived information as sensory modalities select and tend to simplify phenomena so that they merely serve one's interest and need.
