= Nietzsche contra Wagner =

1889 essay by Friedrich Nietzsche

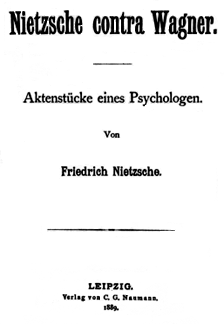
- Title page
- Author: Friedrich Nietzsche
- Original title: Nietzsche contra Wagner
- Translator: Thomas Common, Walter Kaufmann
- Language: German
- Subject: Richard Wagner, antisemitism, philosophy of art
- Publication date: 1889
- Publication place: Germany
- Media type: Paperback, hardcover
- Preceded by: Ecce Homo (1888)
- Followed by: The Will to Power (1901)

Nietzsche contra Wagner; Out of the Files of a Psychologist is a critical essay by Friedrich Nietzsche, composed of selections he chose from among his earlier works. The selections are assembled in this essay in order to focus on Nietzsche's thoughts about the composer Richard Wagner. As he says in the preface, when the selections are read "one after the other they will leave no doubt either about Richard Wagner or about myself: we are antipodes". He also describes it as "an essay for psychologists, but not for Germans". It was written in his last year of lucidity (1888–1889), and published by C. G. Naumann in Leipzig in 1889. Nietzsche describes in this short work why he parted ways with his one-time idol and friend, Richard Wagner. Nietzsche attacks Wagner's views, expressing disappointment and frustration in Wagner's life choices (such as Nietzsche's mistaken belief that Wagner had converted to Christianity, perceived as a sign of weakness). Nietzsche evaluates Wagner's philosophy on tonality, music and art; he admires Wagner's power to emote and express himself, but largely disdains what the philosopher deems his religious biases.

It is easy to suspect that Nietzsche's views must be motivated by a personal quarrel with Wagner. However, Nietzsche had nothing to gain by attacking Wagner; his motives were misunderstood by a public who were influenced by Nietzsche’s early admiration of Wagner, and who were now enthralled by Wagner’s genius. These essays would be hard to comprehend, and would be seen as the work of a disloyal fanatic. On the other hand, Nietzsche's essays express an "underlying admiration and even affection" for Wagner; a "fundamental ambivalence of thought and feeling must be taken as characteristic of Nietzsche’s attitude".

According to Roger Hollinrake, it is reasonable to question Nietzsche’s qualifications to criticize a great musician on very specific musical topics. Nietzsche was a philosopher, and also a musician and composer, though of limited abilities. However gifts of analysis, and gifts of musicianship are not often both given to any one individual. Nietzsche had the broad combined perspective of a scholar, philosopher, historian and poet, abetted by his penetrating insight and an objectivity with a lack of musical bias. Nietzsche's attacks derive from the great importance he gives to art, and from his sense of the seriousness of the artist's duties, and from Nietzsche's fears for the state of culture in his era.

== Thirteen sections ==
The sections are as follows. Nietzsche’s sources, found among his works, are indicated in parentheses:

=== Foreword ===
Nietzsche explains that this book consists of selections from his previous writings. They show that he and Wagner are opposites. Nietzsche states that a reader of this book will conclude that it is for psychologists and not for Germans. He says that he has readers almost everywhere, in New York and in Europe, but not in Germany.

=== Where I Admire Wagner ===
(The Gay Science, 87)
Nietzsche praises Wagner in a number of ways, saying that Wagner

is a master at finding tones in the realm of human suffering, depressed and tortured souls, at giving voice to even mute misery. None can equal him in the colors of late fall, in the indescribably moving happiness of the last, truly last, truly shortest joy.

Nietzsche continues, and then adds that Wagner's music has revealed "some very minute and microscopic aspects of the soul … indeed he is the master of the very minute. But he does not want to be that!" Nietzsche suggests with a metaphor that Wagner prefers to create large works: "His character prefers large walls and audacious frescoes."

=== Where I Make Objections ===
(The Gay Science, 368)
Nietzsche's objections to Wagner's music are physiological—as he listens to Wagner’s music his whole body feels discomfort: He does not breathe easily, his feet begin to rebel, as they do not find a desire to dance or march being satisfied. Wagner is seen as an actor, an “enthusiastic mimomaniac”, and his music is merely an opportunity for poses. Nietzsche suggests Wagner needs to be more honest with himself.

=== Intermezzo ===
(Ecce Homo, Why I Am So Clever, 7)
Nietzsche wants music to be cheerful, profound, unique, wanton, tender, roguish, and graceful. These qualities are lacking in German music, except for the works of Bach, Handel, and also in Wagner's Siegfried Idyll. He praises Liszt, Chopin, Peter Gast, and Rossini, as well as all Venetian music. The Intermezzo ends with Nietzsche's poem “Venice.”

=== Wagner as danger ===
(Human, All Too Human, II,134; The Wanderer and His Shadow, 165)

1. Nietzsche criticizes Wagner’s idea of "endless melody", which is an idea based on Wagner’s criticism of operas in which the melody exists especially in arias, and the arias are separated by less melodic filler. Wagner’s idea is that an entire opera should be instead a continuous or "endless" melody. Nietzsche's concern is that an opera that is all one "endless melody" has the effect similar to a person walking into the ocean, losing one’s footing, then surrendering to the elements, and being forced to tread water. The danger to music is "degeneration of rhythmic feeling" which would be unaccommodating to the element of dance in performance, and the supplanting of rhythm with chaos, which would result in an emphasis on mere "effect" — on posing.
2. Nietzsche then suggests that Wagner feels that all music, to be effective, "must shake the listener to his very intestines," and that such effects are for idiots and the masses.

=== A Music Without a Future ===
(Human All-Too-Human, II,171)
Nietzsche considers that historically, as cultures have developed, music is the last art form to appear — music appears as its culture has begun to fade. "All true, all original music is a swan song." He suggests that the music of his time, "has but a short life span ahead of it", for it arose from a culture that will soon sink and disappear. He speaks specifically of Wagner's music, which may find support and sudden glory, in that the current age was suffering much European warfare and turbulence. But, Nietzsche says, we should not be fooled. "The Germans themselves have no future."

=== We Antipodes ===
(The Gay Science, 370)
In this section Nietzsche states that Wagner and the philosopher Arthur Schopenhauer are to Nietzsche antipodes — opposites. At one time, he and Wagner were not antipodes, but were close. They were very close when Nietzsche was writing his first book, The Birth of Tragedy, which he dedicated to Wagner, and which proclaimed Wagner’s music the modern rebirth. Nietzsche at times lived with Wagner and Wagner’s future wife Cosima, Nietzsche’s first book was in part developed out of long conversations with them both, while at the same time, under the same roof, Wagner was beginning to compose and develop the story of what would eventually become Wagner’s Ring Cycle. Nietzsche, who was fast becoming a notable academic lecturer, was in some danger of being completely eclipsed by the celebrated greatness of Wagner. His declaration of opposition to Wagner and Schopenhauer, represents Nietzsche’s journey towards his independence of mind and spirit and his individuation; a journey he describes in the preface to The Case of Wagner.

Nietzsche considers that every art presupposes sufferers and suffering, and serves either a growing or declining life. And that there are some who suffer an impoverishment of life, and therefore demand from art either calmness or else a frenzy that will anesthetize. Such, with their double needs, are the ones that Wagner responds to. Such decadents need mildness and a god for the sick — a healer, a savior. Nietzsche says after exploring Epicureanism and Christianity, and has developed a sharp eye for what he terms “backwards inference” — to understand the creator by knowing the creation, and to ask: “Is it hatred against life, or the excess of life which has become creative?”

=== Where Wagner Belongs ===
(Beyond Good and Evil, 254, 256)
In this section Nietzsche considers which culture would be most fitting for Wagner – an unexpected question considering that Wagner’s musical and literary creations are richly associated with Germany, and Wagner was passionately pro-German. Nietzsche’s stance is the opposite of Wagner’s — Nietzsche has nothing good to say about Germany.

Nietzsche begins this section by pointing out that France is the "most spiritual and refined culture in Europe," though such Frenchmen may perhaps be few in number and "not among the sturdiest: partly fatalists, somber and sick, partly pampered and artificial." But "French romanticism and Wagner belong together most closely". Northern Germany, on the other hand, according to Nietzsche, is a place of darkness, where some Germans consider the French to be "barbarians". Nietzsche mentions that the German philosopher Arthur Schopenhauer and the German poet Heinrich Heine both belong in France. Nietzsche feels that "Paris is the real soil for Wagner." Wagner would not be flattered by that suggestion. It is possible Nietzsche may be teasing Wagner, who in his writings has vehemently disparaged the French; or perhaps Nietzsche wants to rescue Wagner from a Germany that does not appreciate his greatness. That second possibility is further developed as the section continues, and Nietzsche asks, "Who could be more incapable of understanding Wagner than, for example, the young Kaiser?"

Nietzsche says, do not be fooled by Wagner himself–it was "disgraceful on Wagner’s part to scoff at Paris, as he did, in its agony in 1871." That was 17 years earlier, when the Prussian army was laying siege to the city of Paris as part of the Franco-Prussian War, and the Prussians were bombarding and starving the French people that were trapped. At the time Wagner expressed jubilance about the military action, as Nietzsche, who had enlisted to tend the wounded earlier in the war, was outraged by the barbarity, the deliberate cruelty, and by Wagner’s vengeful and nationalistic reaction.

=== Wagner as Apostle of Chastity ===
(Beyond Good and Evil, 256; On the Genealogy of Morals, III, 2; On the Genealogy of Morals, III, 3)
Here Nietzsche focuses on Wagner’s opera Parsifal. The story of Parsifal is partly based on medieval Germanic legends and Christian ideals, and it dramatizes a conflict between sensuality versus chastity.

1. Part one of "Wagner as Apostle of Chastity" is a verse by Nietzsche, written in the style of a poem by Goethe. Parsifal contains an act of castration, which Nietzsche refers to in line three. Nietzsche’s poem begins by asking:

"Is this still German?
Out of a German heart, this torrid screeching?
A German body, this self-laceration?
German this priestly affectation, this incense-smelling lurid preaching?"

Nietzsche is asking this of Wagner, who is German and a noted devotee of German literature, music, and culture. Nietzsche concludes his poem by pointing out that the opera Parsifal, though dressed in Germanic knightly romance, is expressing Catholicism:

"That which you hear is Rome — Rome’s faith without the text."

2. Nietzsche critiques the theme of "sensuality versus chastity" in Wagner’s opera Parsifal. The opera presents those two aspects in such dire opposition, that when a naive young man encounters an alluring siren in the woods, a "long kiss on the lips" threatens to destroy his hopes of salvation by robbing him of his chastity: The young man responds to the kiss in "utmost terror", he then "flings himself in despair on his knees" and cries out: "Redeemer! Saviour! Lord of grace! How can I, a sinner, purge my guilt?"

Nietzsche responds by saying that, in fact, "There is no necessary objection between sensuality and chastity." Sensuality and chastity can coexist in the human experience, and when there is a conflict, it does not need to be tragic. Nietzsche suggests that there are some "mortals", who find balancing their existence between two extremes, angel and animal, to be an attraction to life itself. It is easy to understand that those who are "brought to the point of adoring chastity" will be obsessed with its opposite, and will adore that. Nietzsche metaphorically refers to such people as "animals of Circe". Circe is a sorceress in the legends of ancient Greece who had the power to turn humans into lions, wolves and swine.

Finally, Nietzsche asks why Wagner "at the end of his life" wanted to set this "embarrassing and perfectly superfluous opposition to music and produce it on the stage."

3. Nietzsche asks what the title character, Parsifal ("that innocence from the country … that poor devil and child of nature whom Wagner finally makes a Catholic") means to Wagner. Nietzsche might prefer Wagner's opera to be meant as a satyr play — that "wanton parody on the tragic", and on "earthly seriousness and earthly misery", and on the "anti-nature of the aesthetic ideal". If Parsifal is taken seriously, it would be seen as a "curse on the senses and the spirit", a regression to "sickly Christian and obscurantist ideals", and a "self-abnegation". Nietzsche remembers "how enthusiastically Wagner once followed in the footsteps of the philosopher Feuerbach". Ludwig Feuerbach, an influential German philosopher, advocated atheism, considering "God" to be the "idealization of human aspirations". Wagner dedicated his essay "The Art Work of the Future" to Feuerbach. Nietzsche concludes, "The preaching of chastity remains an incitement to anti-nature: I despise everyone who does not experience Parsifal as an attempted assassination of basic ethics."

=== How I was Set Free from Wagner ===
(cf. Human All-Too-Human, II, Preface 3-4)
1. By 1876, Wagner had moved to Germany and had become a decaying anti-Semitic Christian. Nietzsche expressed his disappointment and feeling of loss. 2. Nietzsche then became a solitary, courageous pessimist and he completely dedicated himself to his life's arduous task.

=== The Psychologist has a Word ===
(cf. Beyond Good and Evil, 269-270)
1. Sympathy interferes with the psychological analysis of great, higher humans. Psychologists should be cheerfully unsympathetic. Revered, great people always eventually decay. This realization might remind the psychologist of his own decadence and may contribute to his own corruption. The great human's work, not his own person, should be venerated. 2. Great artists and other higher humans create works in order to forget their own decadent flaws. Revering higher people with feminine sympathy is detrimental to them. 3. When a higher human knows deep, heartbreaking suffering, there develops immunity to receiving sympathy from lower humans. Noble, profound sufferers feign cheerfulness in order to ward off unwanted pity.

=== Epilogue ===
(The Gay Science, Preface 3-4)
1. From a universal perspective, deep suffering is necessary, healthful, and beneficial, if it does not kill. Great pain is useful and should be welcomed. Amor fati [love your fate]. It makes a philosopher deeply profound. Questions arise concerning beloved life itself. 2. After experiencing profound pain, a taste for artificial, cheering art is acquired. The horror of life is ignored. Like the ancient Dionysian Greeks, we have known the terrible truth about life and now appreciate the effects of an artist's false, wonderful tones, fictional words, and fascinating forms.

=== On the Poverty of the Richest ===
(Dionysus-Dithyrambs)
"On the Poverty of the Richest" is one of the poems of the Dionysus-Dithrambs, which use poetic imagery taken from Thus Spoke Zarathustra. This collection he referred to as "The Songs of Zarathustra". They were written over a period from 1883 to 1888. Nietzsche intended this poem to be published at the end of Nietzsche contra Wagner; then changed his mind, and removed it from there, and included it in Dionysus-Dithyrambs. "On the Poverty of the Richest" expresses and explores his truth, the death of Zarathustra, self sacrifice, desiring, superabundance, the tale of King Midas, the experience of striving to gain and share wisdom, and the virtue of poverty.

== Bibliography ==
- Andreas Urs Sommer, Kommentar zu Nietzsches Der Antichrist. Ecce homo. Dionysos-Dithyramben. Nietzsche contra Wagner (= Heidelberger Akademie der Wissenschaften (Hg.): Historischer und kritischer Kommentar zu Friedrich Nietzsches Werken, vol. 6/2). XXI + 921 pages. Berlin / Boston: Walter de Gruyter 2013. (ISBN 978-3-11-029277-0) (the comprehensive standard commentary on "Nietzsche contra Wagner" – only available in German)
