= R. J. Hollingdale =

British biographer and translator (1930–2001)

Reginald John Hollingdale
- Born: 20 October 1930; Streatham, London, England
- Died: 28 September 2001 (aged 70)
- Other names: R. J. Hollingdale, Reg Hollingdale
- Citizenship: British
- Education: Bec Grammar School, Tooting
- Known for: Translator of German Literature
- Children: 2

Reginald John Hollingdale (20 October 1930 – 28 September 2001) was a British biographer and translator of German philosophy and literature, especially the works of Friedrich Nietzsche, Goethe, E. T. A. Hoffmann, G. C. Lichtenberg, and Schopenhauer.

== Life and career ==
"Reg" Hollingdale dropped out of Bec Grammar School, Tooting at the age of 16 in order to become a journalist, working in a junior position for a Croydon newspaper. He was called up to the Royal Air Force at a young age in the late 1940s, as part of his National Service, for two years before returning to journalism. After paying his way through private German lessons, and immersing himself in German literature and philosophy, Hollingdale earned the respect of readers and academics with his translations and studies of German cultural figures. Despite not possessing a degree, Hollingdale was elected president of a scholarly society, and was a visiting scholar at the University of Melbourne in 1991–1992. He also worked as a sub-editor at The Guardian and as a critic for The Times Literary Supplement.

Hollingdale was elected President of The Friedrich Nietzsche Society in 1989. Along with Walter Kaufmann, he was responsible for rehabilitating Nietzsche's reputation in the English-speaking world after the Second World War. Hollingdale was an atheist. He had two children, James and Frances.

== Partial bibliography ==
=== Original works ===
- Nietzsche: The Man and his Philosophy (1965; 2nd rvd. edn., 2001)
- Thomas Mann: A Critical Study (1973)
- A Nietzsche Reader (1978)
- Western Philosophy: An Introduction (1994)

=== Translations ===
- Essays and Aphorisms, selections from Parerga and Paralipomena, by Arthur Schopenhauer (1973)
- Elective Affinities, by Goethe (1978)
- Tales of Hoffmann, by E. T. A. Hoffmann (1982)
- Aphorisms, by Georg Christoph Lichtenberg (1990) ISBN 0-14-044519-6; (Reprinted as The Waste Books 2000)

As composed or published by Friedrich Nietzsche in chronological order:

- The Untimely Meditations (1983)
- Human, All-Too-Human: A Book for Free Spirits (1986)
- Daybreak (1982)
- Thus Spoke Zarathustra: A Book for Everyone and No One (1961).
- Beyond Good and Evil: Prelude to a Philosophy of the Future (1973)
- On the Genealogy of Morals (with Walter Kaufmann) (1967)
- Twilight of the Idols / The Antichrist (1968)
- Ecce Homo: How One Becomes What One Is (1986)
- The Will to Power (with Walter Kaufmann) (1967)
- Dithyrambs of Dionysus (2001)
