= Human, All Too Human =

Book by Friedrich Nietzsche

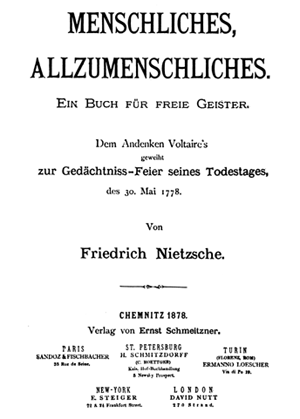
- Title page of first edition.
- Author: Friedrich Nietzsche
- Original title: Menschliches, Allzumenschliches: Ein Buch für freie Geister
- Translator: Alexander Harvey (1st edition)
- Language: German
- Published: April 1878 (first part) (Ernst Schmeitzner)
- Publication place: Germany
- English publication date: 1908
- Pages: 182 pp
- OCLC: 3359010
- LC Class: B3313.M53
- Preceded by: Untimely Meditations (1873–1876)
- Followed by: The Dawn (1881)
- Text: Human, All Too Human at Wikisource

Human, All Too Human: A Book for Free Spirits (German: Menschliches, Allzumenschliches: Ein Buch für freie Geister) is a book by 19th-century philosopher Friedrich Nietzsche, originally published in 1878. A second part, Assorted Opinions and Maxims (Vermischte Meinungen und Sprüche), was published in 1879, and a third part, The Wanderer and his Shadow (Der Wanderer und sein Schatten), followed in 1880.

The book is Nietzsche's first in the aphoristic style that would come to dominate his writings, discussing a variety of concepts in short paragraphs or sayings. Reflecting an admiration of Voltaire as a free thinker, but also a break in his friendship with composer Richard Wagner two years earlier, Nietzsche dedicated the original 1878 edition of Human, All Too Human "to the memory of Voltaire on the celebration of the anniversary of his death, May 30, 1778". Instead of a preface, the first part originally included a quotation from Descartes's Discourse on the Method. Nietzsche later republished all three parts as a two-volume edition in 1886, adding a preface to each volume, and removing the Descartes quotation as well as the dedication to Voltaire.

== Background ==
In 1876, Nietzsche broke with Wagner, and in the same year his increasingly bad health (possibly the early effects of a brain tumor, or on another theory, CADASIL) compelled him to request a leave of absence from his academic duties at the University of Basel. In the autumn of 1876, he joined his friend Paul Rée in Sorrento, at the home of a wealthy patron of the arts, Malwida von Meysenbug, and began work on Human, All Too Human.

=== Inspiration ===
The genre of the aphorism was already well established at the time of writing this book: in the German tradition, Nietzsche's most important predecessor was a figure of the Enlightenment, Georg Christoph Lichtenberg, whose writing Nietzsche greatly admired. Nietzsche's work is indebted also to Schopenhauer's, particularly his Aphorisms for Practical Wisdom (1851). Above all else is the "debt to the French tradition of the aphorism – for Nietzsche's work is a deliberate turn westward". Nietzsche cites the French aphorists Jean de La Bruyère and Prosper Mérimée, and in Aphorism 221 celebrates Voltaire.

At the beginning of the second section, Nietzsche mentions La Rochefoucauld—named here as a model, the epitome of the aphorist—and it is known that Nietzsche had a copy of La Rochefoucauld's Sentences et maximes (1665) in his library. He had been reading it shortly before beginning to write Human, All Too Human, on the train ride to Sorrento. More than that of the other French aphorists mentioned, it is La Rochefoucauld's work that lies behind that of Nietzsche.

== Style ==
Unlike his first book, The Birth of Tragedy, which was written in essay style, Human, All Too Human is a collection of aphorisms, a style which Nietzsche would use in many of his subsequent works.

The aphorisms of Human, All Too Human range from a few words to a few pages, but most are short paragraphs. The 638 aphorisms of the first installment are divided by subject into nine sections, with a short poem as an epilogue. The eponymous phrase itself appears in Aphorism 35 (originally conceived as the first aphorism) "when Nietzsche observes that maxims about human nature can help in overcoming life's hard moments". Implicit also, is a drive to overcome what is human, all too human through understanding it, through philosophy. The second and third installments are an additional 408 and 350 aphorisms respectively.

Nietzsche's work, while inspired by the work of aphorists like La Rochefoucauld who came before him, "is unique";

[H]e covers a range of issues far greater than the social and psychological area of interest to La Rochefoucauld. To the cynicism typical of the genre, Nietzsche brings a new dimension by his combination of nihilistic energy with historical consciousness. Finally, he expands the genre to include not merely insights, but argument as well."

The aphorism "allows for a loosely organised, shifting whole containing specific ideas but no iron-clad explanation for everything, – [it] constitutes the style that best represents his philosophy".

This book represents the beginning of Nietzsche's 'middle period', with a break from German Romanticism and from Wagner and with a definite positivist slant. Reluctant to construct a systematic philosophy, this book comprises more a collection of debunkings of unwarranted assumptions than an interpretation; it "contains the seeds of concepts crucial to Nietzsche's later philosophy, such as the need to transcend conventional Christian morality". He uses his perspectivism and the idea of the will to power as explanatory devices, though the latter remains less developed than in his later thought.

== Structure and content ==
=== Of First and Last Things ===
In this first section, Nietzsche deals with metaphysics, specifically its origins as relating to dreams, the dissatisfaction with oneself, and language as well.

=== On the History of Moral Feelings ===
This section, named in honor of his friend Paul Rée's On the Origin of Moral Sensations, Nietzsche challenges the Christian idea of good and evil, as it was philosophized by Arthur Schopenhauer.

At the waterfall. When we see a waterfall, we think we see freedom of will and choice in the innumerable turnings, windings, breakings of the waves; but everything is necessary; each movement can be calculated mathematically. Thus it is with human actions; if one were omniscient, one would be able to calculate each individual action in advance, each step in the progress of knowledge, each error, each act of malice. To be sure the acting man is caught in his illusion of volition; if the wheel of the world were to stand still for a moment and an omniscient, calculating mind were there to take advantage of this interruption, he would be able to tell into the farthest future of each being and describe every rut that wheel will roll upon. The acting man's delusion about himself, his assumption that free will exists, is also part of the calculable mechanism.

=== Religious Life ===
Following from conclusions in the second section about the inevitable self-interestedness of human conduct, Nietzsche attacks the Christian God as an unattainable ideal. The wholly selfless Christian God is remote from human experience, leaving Christians dissatisfied, anxious, and ashamed. Nietzsche further criticises Christian priests as saints for exacerbating these feelings, urging that Christianity has made people less capable of standing up to the tragedy and absurdity of life.

=== From the Soul of Artists and Writers ===
Nietzsche uses this section to denounce the idea of divine inspiration in art, claiming that great art is the result of hard work, not a higher power or 'genius'. This can be interpreted as a veiled attack on his former friend Wagner (a strong believer in genius), though Nietzsche never mentions him by name, instead simply using the term 'the artist'.

=== Signs of Higher and Lower Culture ===
Here, Nietzsche criticizes Charles Darwin, as he frequently does, for being naive and derivative of Thomas Hobbes and early English economists, as well as for being without an account of life from the 'inside'. Consider, in this light, Darwin's own introduction to the first edition of Origin; also Nietzsche's critique to the effect that Darwinism, as typically understood, is trading in a new version of the Providential:

Wherever progress is to ensue, deviating natures are of greatest importance. Every progress of the whole must be preceded by a partial weakening. The strongest natures retain the type, the weaker ones help to advance it. Something similar also happens in the individual. There is rarely a degeneration, a truncation, or even a vice or any physical or 'moral' loss without an advantage somewhere else. In a warlike and restless clan, for example, the sicklier man may have occasion to be alone, and may therefore become quieter and wiser; the one-eyed man will have one eye the stronger; the blind man may see deeper inwardly, and certainly hear better. To this extent, the famous theory of the survival of the fittest does not seem to be the only viewpoint from which to explain the progress of strengthening of a man or of a race.

Nietzsche writes of the 'free spirit' or 'free thinker' (German: freigeist), and his role in society; a sort of proto-Übermensch, forming the basis of a concept he extensively explores in his later work, Thus Spoke Zarathustra. A free spirit is one who goes against the herd, and "onwards along the path of wisdom" in order to better society. 'Better', for Nietzsche, appears to mean ordered toward the production of rare genius and is hardly to be confused with what 'a newspaper reader' as Nietzsche might put it, would expect. The essential thing to keep in mind in considering Zarathustra, in particular, is that Nietzsche presents Zarathustra as failing.

=== Man in Society and Women and Child ===
These two sections are made up of very short aphorisms on men's, women's and the child's nature or their 'evolution' in Nietzsche's subtle, anti-Darwinian sense. Scholar Ruth Abbey has commented of works from Nietzsche's 'middle period' that, "Contrary to the common classification of Nietzsche as a misogynist, the works of the middle period do not openly denigrate or dismiss women... Nietzsche's views on women were at this time more nuanced and less vitriolic than they became". In this section, Nietzsche remarks that the perfect woman is a "higher type of human being than the perfect man: also something much rarer".

=== Man Alone with Himself ===
Like sections six and seven, Nietzsche's aphorisms here are mostly short, but also poetic and at times could be interpreted as semi-autobiographical, in anticipation of the next volumes: "He who has come only in part to a freedom of reason cannot feel on earth otherwise than as a wanderer".

Nietzsche also distinguishes the obscurantism of the metaphysicians and theologians from the more subtle obscurantism of Kant's critical philosophy and modern philosophical skepticism, claiming that obscurantism is that which obscures existence rather than obscures ideas alone: "The essential element in the black art of obscurantism is not that it wants to darken individual understanding but that it wants to blacken our picture of the world, and darken our idea of existence".

== Reception ==
Within his lifetime, prior to his mental breakdown in 1889, few of Nietzsche's books sold particularly well, and Human, All Too Human was no exception. The first installment was originally printed in 1,000 copies in 1878, selling only 120 at the time, and selling less than half by 1886, when it was resold as the complete two-volume set. Though his friendship with Richard Wagner was nearly over, Wagner actually received a signed copy. Although he did not read it at first, saying Nietzsche would thank him for this one day, Wagner would later quote and respond to it in a number of works.

=== Oehler and Nazism ===
Most notoriously, Human, All Too Human was used by archivist Max Oehler, a strong supporter of Hitler, as supposed evidence of Nietzsche's support for nationalism and anti-Semitism, both of which he writes against. Oehler wrote an entire book, Friedrich Nietzsche und die Deutsche Zukunft ('Friedrich Nietzsche and the German Future'), dealing with Nietzsche and his connection to nationalism (specifically National Socialism) and anti-Semitism, using quotes from Human, All Too Human, though out of context. Nietzsche would speak against anti-Semitism in other works including Thus Spoke Zarathustra and, most strongly, in The Antichrist: "An anti-Semite is certainly not any more decent because he lies as a matter of principle". In Zarathustra, Nietzsche set Wagner up as a straw man, lampooning his anti-Semitism in the process.

Oehler also had control of Nietzsche's archive during the Nazis' rule, which he shared with Nietzsche's sister, Elisabeth Förster-Nietzsche, a Hitler supporter herself, until her death, when he took it over. It was not until much of Walter Kaufmann's work in the 1950s through the 1970s that Nietzsche was able to shed this connection with nationalism and anti-Semitism.

== Translations ==
The work was first translated into English in 1908 by Alexander Harvey, a Belgian-born American journalist, and was published in Chicago by Charles. H. Kerr, a small but notable publishing house of socially progressive literature. Following this, a 1909 translation by writer Helen Zimmern was published as part of a complete edition of Nietzsche's books in English.

The book was not translated in full by Walter Kaufmann when he translated most of Nietzsche's works into English in the 1950s and 1960s. However, Kaufmann included excerpts from it in his edition of The Portable Nietzsche (New York: The Viking Press, 1954).

During the 1980s, the first part of the book was translated by Marion Faber and the whole work was translated by R.J. Hollingdale. Faber was critical of Zimmern's "antiquated Victorian style" which, in her opinion, makes Nietzsche read "like a fusty contemporary of Matthew Arnold". Faber further noted bowdlerizations and errors in Zimmern's work. For example, in Aphorism 61, Schaf ("sheep") is translated by Zimmern as fool, where the reference is to Sophocles' play Ajax in which the hero charges a herd of sheep.

== Critical Commentary ==
Human, All Too Human is comprehensively explored, reconstructed argumentatively, and broken down into its sources in:

- Andreas Urs Sommer: Kommentar zu Nietzsches Menschliches, Allzumenschliches I (= Heidelberger Akademie der Wissenschaften (Hg.): Historischer und kritischer Kommentar zu Friedrich Nietzsches Werken, Bd. 2/1.1 und Bd. 2/1.2). 2 Teilbände. XVII + 1104 Seiten. Berlin / Boston: Walter de Gruyter 2025, ISBN 978-3-11-029281-7, Ebook: ISBN 978-3-11-029295-4, see

== Bibliography ==
- Kaufmann, Walter A. (1974). "The Master Race". Nietzsche: Philosopher, Psychologist, Antichrist (4th ed.). Princeton, NJ: Princeton University Press. ISBN 9780691019833.
- Nietzsche, Friedrich W. (1984) [1878]. Human, All Too Human: a Book for Free Spirits. Translated by Marion Faber & Stephen Lehmann. Lincoln, NE: University of Nebraska Press.
- Nietzsche, Friedrich W. (1996) [1878]. Human, All Too Human: a Book for Free Spirits. Translated by R. J. Hollingdale. Cambridge: Cambridge University Press.

=== Sources ===
- Copleston, Frederick C. [1963] 2003. Modern Philosophy: From the Post-Kantian Idealists to Marx, Kierkegaard, and Nietzsche, A History of Philosophy, vol. VII. London: Continuum. ISBN 9780826469014.
- Craig, Gordon A. 1978. Germany: 1866-1945. Oxford: Oxford University Press.
- Kaufmann, Walter A. 1974. Nietzsche: Philosopher, Psychologist, Antichrist (4th ed.). Princeton: Princeton University Press.
- —— ed. and trans. 1954. The Portable Nietzsche. New York: Viking Press.
- —— ed. and trans. 2000. Basic Writings of Nietzsche. New York: Modern Library.
- Nietzsche, Friedrich W. [1878] 1984. Human, All Too Human: A Book for Free Spirits, translated by M. Faber and S. Lehmann. Lincoln: University of Nebraska Press.
- —— 1996. Human, All Too Human: A Book for Free Spirits, translated by R. J. Hollingdale. Cambridge: Cambridge University Press.
- Tanner, Michael, et al. 1997. German Philosophers: Kant, Hegel, Schopenhauer, Nietzsche. Oxford: Oxford University Press.
