= Matthias Politycki =

German novelist and poet (born 1955)

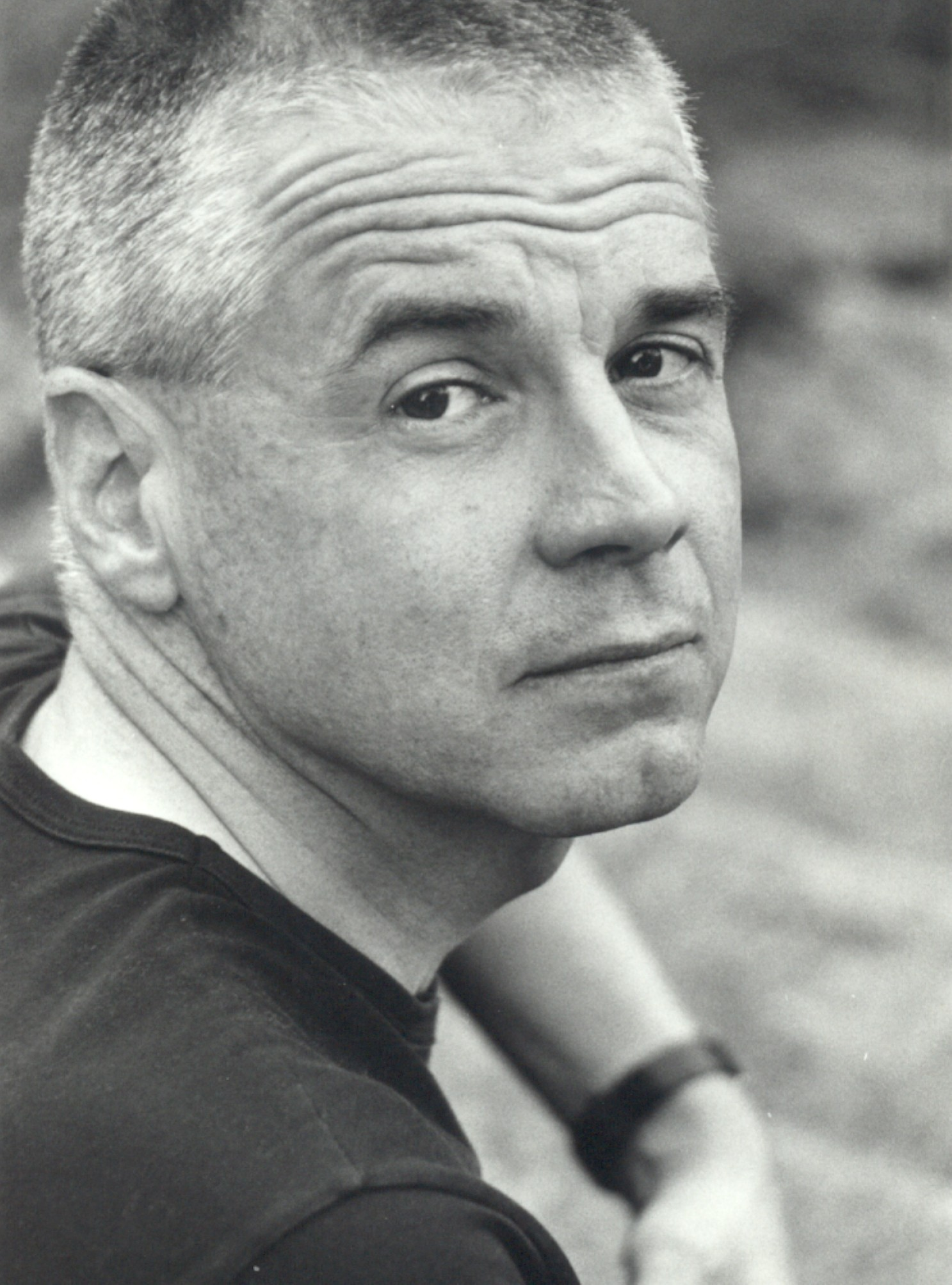
- Politycki
- Born: 20 May 1955 (age 71); Karlsruhe, Germany
- Occupations: Novelist and poet
- Website: https://www.matthias-politycki.de/

Matthias Politycki (born in Karlsruhe on May 20, 1955) is a German novelist and poet. He studied at LMU Munich and the University of Vienna and obtained a PhD in philosophy in 1987. His first novel Aus Fälle/Zerlegung des Regenbogens. Ein Entwickelungsroman. (Drop Outs / Disassembling the Rainbow. An Entwicklungsroman) appeared that same year. His breakthrough came in 1997 with Weiberroman (Novel of Women) and in 2008 with his cruise ship satire In 180 Tagen um die Welt (Around the World in 180 Days).

His lifetime passion to travel to foreign countries also influences his perception of his own culture, and provides a source of new ideas for his writing. Politycki's London for Heroes. The Ale Trail – an ale tale emerged from his excursions to London's East End pubs while he was Writer in Residence at Queen Mary University of London in 2009. His books have been translated into French, Italian, Japanese and Chinese. His Next World Novella (Jenseitsnovelle) was translated by Anthea Bell, OBE and published by Peirene Press in 2011.

Politycki has completed numerous book tours, including at the Edinburgh World Writers' Conference in August 2012 and the Belfast Festival at Queen's in October 2014. His collected poems were published by Hoffmann und Campe in 2018. He has won numerous awards including the Ernst-Hoferichter-Preis in 2009.

== Life ==
Politycki grew up in Munich and began writing aged sixteen when he was disappointed in love. He achieved his school-leaving certificate (Abitur) in 1974 at the Maria-Theresia-Gymnasium. His military service was with 541 Infantry Battalion in Neuburg an der Donau in 1974/75. He completed a training exercise as a military reserve in 1977, but from then on he refused further active duty. He was officially recognized as a conscientious objector on 21 December 1977.

From 1975 to 1987, he studied German literature, philosophy, theatre- and communication studies at LMU Munich and the University of Vienna and graduated in 1981 with a Magister degree. In 1987, he completed his PhD with Walter Müller-Seidel at LMU Munich. His dissertation on Nietzsche as a subtle interpreter of the influence of tradition and contemporary value-ideals was entitled Umwertung aller Werte? Deutsche Literatur im Urteil Nietzsches.

Politycki taught for three semesters as a tenured assistant professor at the Munich Institut für Deutsche Philologie. His career as a freelance writer began in earnest in 1990, although he continued as a freelance editor for Munich Publishers C.H. Beck until 1999. He encouraged dialogue among writers, literary editors and critics as organizer of the annual "Untitled" conferences from 2000 to 2005 at Schloss Elmau in the Bavarian Alps. In 2011, he was curator of the Munich Literature Festival. Politycki is a member of the PEN Centre Germany and the Freie Akademie der Künste Hamburg in Hamburg. He lived in Hamburg and Munich. Since 2021, he lives in Vienna.

== Literary work ==
=== Novels and short stories ===
Matthias Politycki's first novel in 1987 Aus Fälle / Zerlegung des Regenbogens. Ein Entwickelungsroman. (Drop Outs / Disassembling the Rainbow. An Entwickelungsroman) was experimental and echoed the writing style of Arno Schmidt and James Joyce. He was described as a "form-fixated avant-gardist". By the early 1990s, his sights were set on a "new readability" of German literature. He argued that "literature must be like rock music".

After Weiberroman in 1997, Politycki acknowledged his identity as a writer from the "Generation of 1978" (Reinhard Mohr) that he distinguished from the 1968 Movement with its strong protest tradition. His book was described as a cult novel; it is regarded as a key text of Postmodern literature in Germany.

After five months in the Caribbean, his constant quest to explore the experience of a clash between familiar and foreign cultures emerged in his 2005 Cuba novel, Herr der Hörner (Lord of the Horns). This was the tale of an enlightened European's fight for survival in a culture influenced by archaic rituals. The story was a "search for the exotic" as much as about the will to resist the belief-system of Palo (religion) and Santería religions, and a "culmination of Nietzsche's admired 'Dionysian worldview'".

In 2006, Hapag-Lloyd invited Politycki to become a writer-in-(non)-residence on board its luxury passenger ship MS Europa. Ten years after his best-selling Weiberroman, Politycki matched its success with his 2008 picaresque novel In 180 Tagen um die Welt. This is the story of a "modern Simplicissimus" who describes "the rituals of the rich and the super-rich".

His Next World Novella gives a poignant insight into the mind of his protagonist, an expert in Chinese studies Hinrich Schepp. Schepp's story begins with the discovery that his wife, Doro, suffered a fatal stroke while editing his manuscript. Her constant fear of death – the 'beyondness' of things (jenseits) – compels him to reassess their life together. However, he realizes, too late, that her eloquent criticisms of his forgotten manuscript also bring to light her hidden perception of their married life. As critic Rebecca Morrison explains, Politycki "leavens his grim tale with playful teasing of his reader's expectations".

In his 2013novel Samarkand Samarkand, the carefully honed plot, which took about twenty-five years to create, shifts attention to the year 2026. The scene is set in legendary Samarkand, where Alexander Kaufner, a mountain ranger and frontier runner, embarks on a quest to find a mysterious cult place, a second Samarkand somewhere hidden high up in the mountains. The novel evolves a dark dystopia of the free West on the brink of collapse due to the aggression of Greater-Russia and the fundamentalist alliances of the Caliph of Baghdad. Kaufner's mission is to save the Western world from destruction. The critic Martin Halter commented that "Samarkand Samarkand is an immensely eloquent, oriental and vivid travelogue and adventure story that penetrates to the heart of darkness."

Among Politycki's literary role models – Laurence Sterne, Diderot, Gottfried Benn and Vladimir Nabokov – he recently acknowledged Ernest Hemingway as an important influence for the "simplicity and reduction" of his own writing style.

=== Essays ===
Politycki's new hybrid genre of non-fictional literature became evident in 2015 with his 42,195, an autobiographical book about marathon running. His Schrecklich schön und weit und wild (Fearsomely Beautiful and Far and Wild) in 2017 was described as a "mix of philosophical essay and autobiographical field report" about "the past, present and future of travel".

Politycki's prolific newspaper articles are collected in two essay editions (1998 and 2007). He has voiced his view of the novel in German literature as an orientation map to the world in Relevanter Realismus, published as Was soll der Roman? (What Purpose for the Novel?) and, more focused on the growing controversy with other cultures, Weißer Mann – was nun?(What Now – White Man?). His standpoint on writing, which he compared to marathon running, was illustrated in a plenary lecture at the German Germanistentag in 2016. Programmatically entitled "Reduktion & Tempo", his talk was published in the Göttinger Sudelblätter (2017).

=== Poetry ===
Politycki presented all of his many poetry collections on stage. In 1996–1997, he went on tour with Robert Gernhardt and their common lyrical program Wein, Weib und Gesang (Wine, Women and Song); in 2004–2005 he joined Hellmuth Opitz and Steffen Jacobs with Frauen. Naja. Schwierig (Women. Well Now. Difficult). Publisher Uwe Wittstock described him as "the greatest living linguistic gourmet among German poets". Politycki's collected poetry edition Sämtliche Gedichte 2017–1987 was awarded NDR Book of the Month in June 2018. It is a collection of previously published monographs, sporadically released poems as well as a new poem cycle and contains an afterword by Wolfgang Frühwald.

== Awards ==
Matthias Politycki's first novel Aus Fälle / Zerlegung des Regenbogens won the Civitas-Literaturpreis in 1987 and the Bayerischer Staatsförderpreis for literature in 1988. In 2009, he received the Ernst-Hoferichter-Preis of the city of Munich. He was awarded the Preis der LiteraTour Nord in 2010.

In 2014, he became Writer in Residence in Osaka to celebrate the 25-year anniversary of the town-twinning of Hamburg and Osaka. That same year, he was Artist in Residence in St Moritz. He received the travel scholarship Literarischer Landgang of the Literaturbüro Oldenburg in 2015. As a recipient of a travel stipend of the Deutscher Literaturfonds and Sylt Foundation, in 2017 he travelled in Cambodia on the trail of the Khmer Rouge. In 2018, Schrecklich schön und weit und wild received the ITB BuchAward of the Internationale Tourismus Börse (ITB) Berlin.

His excursion to China in September 2018 was as Writer in Residence on the invitation of the Shanghai Writers' Association. He accepted a new invitation from the Chinese Writers' Association and the Lu Xun Academy as Writer in Residence in Beijing in 2019.

== Publications ==
Politycki's works have been translated into English, Irish, French, Italian, Japanese and Chinese. Available in English: Next World Novella. (2011). (Tr from the German: Anthea Bell). Peirene Press London. Sphärenmusik, Music of the Spheres, Ceol na Sféar. Ausgewählte Gedichte – Selected Poems – Rocha Dánta. (2011). (Tr English Hans-Christian Oeser; Gaelige/Irish Gabriel Rosenstock). Coiscéim Dublin.

=== Novels and short stories ===
- Meine Reise zum Tadsch Mahal (2018). Hoffmann und Campe, Hamburg. ISBN 978-3-455-00536-3.
- Samarkand Samarkand (2013). Hoffmann und Campe, Hamburg. ISBN 978-3-455-40443-2.
- Freischwimmer. Drei Erzählungen (2011). Svato Verlag, Hamburg. Mit 11 farbigen Linolschnitten von Svato Zapletal.
- Jenseitsnovelle (2009). Hoffmann und Campe, Hamburg. ISBN 978-3-455-40194-3.
- In 180 Tagen um die Welt. Das Logbuch des Herrn Johann Gottlieb Fichtl (2008). marebuchverlag, Hamburg.
- Herr der Hörner (2005). Hoffmann und Campe, Hamburg.
- Das Schweigen am andern Ende des Rüssels (2001). Hoffmann und Campe, Hamburg.
- Ein Mann von vierzig Jahren (2000). Luchterhand Literaturverlag, Munich.
- Weiberroman (1997). Luchterhand Literaturverlag, Munich.
- Der böse Einfluß der Bifi-Wurst. Ein End- und ein Nachspiel (1996). Verlag Ulrich Keicher (=Roter Faden 44), Warmbronn.
- Taifun über Kyoto (1993). Luchterhand Literaturverlag, Hamburg.
- Sonnenbaden in Sibirien. Dreiseitige Geschichten (1991). Verlag Ulrich Keicher (=Roter Faden 30), Warmbronn.
- Aus Fälle / Zerlegung des Regenbogens. Ein Entwickelungsroman (1987). Weismann Verlag, Munich.

=== Poetry ===
- Sämtliche Gedichte 2017–1987 (2018). Hoffmann und Campe, Hamburg. ISBN 978-3-455-81419-4.
- Dies irre Geglitzer in deinem Blick. 111 Gedichte. (2015). Hoffmann und Campe, Hamburg. ISBN 978-3-455-40506-4.
- Ägyptische Plagen. Gebirg und Wüste Sinai. 13 Gedichte. (2015). Hoffmann und Campe, Hamburg. ISBN 978-3-455-40510-1.
- Dieser schwüle Nachmittag damals. Vier Sorten Schmerz (Dreizehn Gedichte mit dreizehn Knispels ("Schokoküsse") von Felix Droese). (2015). Limitierter Privatdruck. Carl-Walter Kottnik, Hamburg.
- London für Helden. The Ale Trail – Expedition ins Bierreich (2011). Hoffmann und Campe, Hamburg. ISBN 978-3-455-40323-7.
- Die Sekunden danach. 88 Gedichte (2009). Hoffmann und Campe, Hamburg. ISBN 978-3-455-40145-5.
- Ratschlag zum Verzehr der Seidenraupe. 66 Gedichte (2003). Hoffmann und Campe, Hamburg.
- Die zwei Arten, den Caipirinha zu bestellen. Ein Gedicht (2000). Verlag Ulrich Keicher (limitierter Sonderdruck), Warmbronn.
- Jenseits von Wurst und Käse. 44 Gedichte (1995). Luchterhand Literaturverlag, Hamburg.
- Die Wahrheit über Kaffeetrinker. Ein Gedicht (1993). Verlag Ulrich Keicher (limitierter Sonderdruck), Warmbronn.
- Im Schatten der Schrift hier. 22 Gedichte (1988). Weismann Verlag, Munich.

=== Essays ===
- Haltung finden. Warum wir sie brauchen und trotzdem nie haben werden. (2019). Mit Andreas Urs Sommer. J.B. Metzler, Heidelberg.
- Literatur und Politik nach 1968 und in der Gegenwart. Ein Vortrag. (2019). Verlag Ulrich Keicher, Warmbronn.
- Schrecklich schön und weit und wild. Warum wir reisen und was wir dabei denken (2017). Hoffmann und Campe, Hamburg.
- Reduktion & Tempo. Als Erzähler unterwegs im 21. Jahrhundert (2017). Wallstein Verlag, Göttingen.
- 42,195. Warum wir Marathon laufen und was wir dabei denken (2015). Hoffmann und Campe, Hamburg.
- Vom Verschwinden der Dinge in der Zukunft. Bestimmte Artikel 2006–1998 (2007). Hoffmann und Campe, Hamburg.
- Marietta – die Idee, der Datensatz und der Strohhut. Schreiben und Schreiben-Lassen im Internet (2000). Franz Steiner Verlag (=Akademie der Wissenschaften und der Literatur Mainz, Abhandlung No 1/2000 der Klasse der Literatur), Stuttgart.
- Die Farbe der Vokale. Von der Literatur, den 78ern und dem Gequake satter Frösche (1998). Luchterhand Literaturverlag, Munich.

=== Editorship and miscellaneous ===
- Das Gedicht. Nr. 20. Das Beste aus 20 Jahren – und für die nächsten 20 Jahre (2012). Jubiliäumsausgabe, mit A. Leitner. Weßling. ISBN 978-3-929433-72-2.
- London, Signale aus der Weltmaschine (2011). Corso Verlag, Hamburg. ISBN 978-3-86260-015-1.
- Marietta / Ein Mann von vierzig Jahren (1999) Dokumentation des ZDF-Projekts "Novel in Progress" auf der Homepage von Aspekte ZDF. CD Rom. ZDF Online / Luchterhand Literaturverlag, Munich (et al.).
- Hundert notwendige Gedichte. Und ein überflüssiges (1992) Luchterhand Literaturverlag, Hamburg, Zurich.

=== Non-fiction books ===
- Umwertung aller Werte? Deutsche Literatur im Urteil Nietzsches (1989). De Gruyter, Berlin.
- Der frühe Nietzsche und die deutsche Klassik. Studien zu Problemen literarischer Wertung (1981). Münchner Hochschulschriften, Straubing.

=== Audio books ===
- 42,195. Warum wir Marathon laufen und was wir dabei denken (Hörbuch, gelesen von Matthias Politycki). (2015). erlesen.TV GmbH.
- Samarkand Samarkand (Sprecher: Matthias Politycki). (2013). Hoffmann und Campe, Hamburg.
- London für Helden. The Ale Trail (Mit Peter Lohmeyer und Colin Soleman) (2011). Verlag Antje Kunstmann, Munich.
- Jenseitsnovelle (Mit Nina Petri) (2009). Radioropa/Technisat, Daun.
- Das Schiff. Erlebnisse einer Weltreise mit Matthias Politycki (2008). Hörbuch von Wolfgang Stockmann, Logbuchtexte und Erzähler: Matthias Politycki. Verlag Antje Kunstmann, Munich.
- Des Teufels Amulett (2007). Münchner Frühling Verlag, Munich.
- Frauen. Naja. Schwierig (Mit Hellmuth Opitz und Steffen Jacobs) (2005). Hoffmann und Campe, Hamburg.
- Das Schweigen am andern Ende des Rüssels (2001). Hoffmann und Campe, Hamburg.
- Ein Mann von vierzig Jahren (2000). Hörbuch Hamburg/Deutschlandradio, Hamburg.
