= PEN Centre Germany =

German association of writers

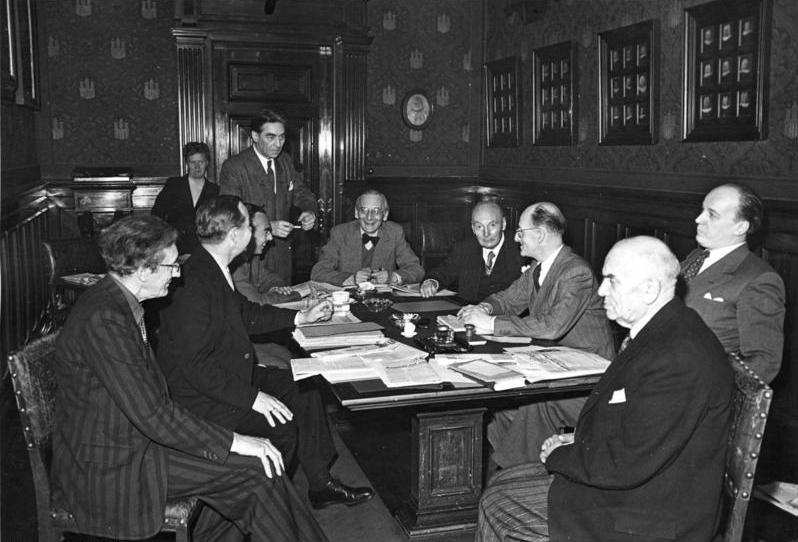
- PEN Centre Germany: the first meeting held in Hamburg on 12 April 1949
- Formation: 1924; 102 years ago
- Type: NGO
- Purpose: Writers' association
- Headquarters: Darmstadt, Hesse
- Region served: Germany
- President: Matthias Politycki
- Parent organization: PEN International
- Website: pen-deutschland.de

PEN Centre Germany is part of the worldwide association of writers founded in London in 1921, now known as PEN International. One of over 140 autonomous PEN centres around the world, PEN Centre Germany is based in Darmstadt, Hesse.

== Work ==
PEN Centre Germany upholds the objectives of PEN International in protecting the freedom of intellectual expression throughout the world. PEN Centre Germany supports two main programmes: Writers in Prison and Writers in Exile. Founded in 1999, Writers in Exile is a programme supporting international writers who are given the opportunity to live and work in safety, with accommodation provided in Berlin, Cologne, Hamburg and Munich together with living expenses.

Since 1985 PEN Centre Germany has awarded the Hermann Kesten Prize for outstanding services to persecuted authors.

PEN Centre Germany is also a participant in the annual Writers for Peace Committee founded in 1984.

== History of PEN Centre Germany ==
=== Weimar Republic ===
The German branch of International PEN was founded in 1924 under the direction of Ludwig Fulda. This was supported by the founding president of PEN, John Galsworthy. PEN Centre Germany arranged its first international conference in Berlin in 1926 and the organisation flourished until the rise of Nazism.

=== Under Nazism ===
In 1933 the then president, Alfred Kerr fled into exile as soon as the Nazis took power and in January 1935, under difficult political circumstances, PEN Centre Germany became known as the Union of National Writers. This organisation was supportive of Nazism and heavily criticised by PEN International for its failure to condemn the burning of books by the Nazis in 1933. In response to these circumstances, in 1934 a PEN centre was set up for German writers in exile based in London, with Heinrich Mann as president.

=== After World War II ===
In 1948 PEN Centre Germany was re-founded in Göttingen. Soon afterwards, when East and West Germany were created as separate states in 1949, PEN split into two organisations to reflect the new political reality. This split continued until after German reunification and a united PEN Centre Germany was finally established in 1998.
