= Ivan Soll =

American philosopher

- Born: March 1938 (age 88)

Academic background
- Education: Princeton (Ph.D 1966)
- Thesis: Hegel's Search for Absolute Knowledge (1966)
- Influences: Friedrich Nietzsche, Georg Wilhelm Friedrich Hegel, Arthur Schopenhauer, Jean-Paul Sartre

Academic work
- Era: 20th / 21st-century philosophy
- Region: Western Philosophy
- School or tradition: Continental Philosophy
- Main interests: German philosophy, Existentialism, History of Philosophy, Aesthetics

Albert Ivan Soll (born March 1938) is an American philosopher who is a Professor Emeritus in the Department of Philosophy at the University of Wisconsin–Madison in the United States. He taught at UW from 1965 until his retirement in May 2011. His teaching and research focused on the philosophy of Friedrich Nietzsche, German philosophy in general, existentialism, aesthetics, and various figures of continental philosophy.

== Background ==
Soll was a student of Nietzsche scholar and translator Walter Kaufmann while at Princeton University. Soll completed his A.B. at Princeton University in 1960 with a senior thesis titled "Futility, Freedom and Freud: A Critical Triptych on the Philosophy of Jean-Paul Sartre". He then pursued graduate studies in philosophy at Harvard University, LMU Munich, and Princeton University, where he received his Ph.D. in 1966 with a dissertation titled "Hegel’s Search For Absolute Knowledge".

Soll taught the majority of his academic career at the University of Wisconsin–Madison. He came to UW-Madison as an instructor in philosophy in 1964, and taught there until his retirement in May 2011. He was promoted to assistant professor in 1966, promoted again to associate professor with tenure in 1969, and to full professor in 1973. He has also held visiting professorships at Justus-Liebig University (Germany), the University of Auckland, and the Boğaziçi University, Istanbul. His philosophical interests include continental philosophy - especially German philosophy, Friedrich Nietzsche, Georg Wilhelm Friedrich Hegel, Arthur Schopenhauer, Jean-Paul Sartre, Albert Camus, and existentialism generally. He also focused on the intersections of philosophy and literature, the history of philosophy, aesthetics, philosophical psychology, and philosophy of life.

He has published widely in aesthetics, and complements his academic knowledge with expert proficiency in the manufacture of fine art books. Ivan has exhibited his hand-crafted art books in many galleries around the world, and he has integrated the experience in doing so with his academic work. In the area of German philosophy, he has written the influential Introduction to Hegel's Metaphysics, has authored more than 50 scholarly articles, and has given nearly 130 talks at various national and international venues.

Soll has been the recipient of NEH, ACLS, and UW-Madison IRH fellowships, as well as a Bellagio fellowship from the Rockefeller Foundation and a German D.A.A.D award. He has frequently been the lead professor at UW-Madison study abroad programs: in London (twice), Florence (five times) and Budapest (twice).

== Ideas, activities and contributions ==
Soll established his reputation among Nietzsche scholars with his 1973 essay "Reflections on Recurrence: A Re-Examination of Nietzsche's Doctrine" which puts forth a novel interpretation of Nietzsche's idea of the eternal recurrence. Soll's interpretation states that the literal possibility of the eternal recurrence is not as important as taking on the idea for what its consequences imply. He argues that the implications of this idea force the individual to evaluate past, current, and future life choices.

Documented in the book Genius In Their Own Words: The Intellectual Journeys of Seven Great 20th-Century Thinkers edited by David Ramsay Steele (foreword by Arthur Danto) a mediated series of questions posed by Soll were presented to the famed French existentialist philosopher Jean-Paul Sartre on various aspects of Sartre's philosophy with Sartre providing his answers to Soll's questions.

Soll contributed three introductions to Walter Kaufmann's Discovering the Mind series of books which were some of the last published works from Kaufmann. Soll has also authored several encyclopedia entries on different topics of philosophy. He continues to be discussed by younger Nietzsche scholars like Bernard Reginster who engaged with his ideas in the 2006 book The Affirmation of Life: Nietzsche on Overcoming Nihilism.

Soll's courses on Nietzsche and Existentialism at the University of Wisconsin–Madison continue to be popular courses in the Wisconsin Philosophy Department. He regularly teaches Introduction to Philosophy thereby introducing the discipline to many new students.

Soll and his wife, Marta Gomez, have produced original artists' books collaboratively at their Tiramisu Press in Madison, Wisconsin.

Soll was a participant in the Peter Sloterdijk lecture series seminar and conference workshop, 19 to 23 May 2008 at the University of Warwick where he discussed the relationship between the philosophies of Sloterdijk and Nietzsche.

Soll completed an essay on Charles Darwin's influence on German philosophy for a volume on Darwin to be published in Turkey, and an essay on Nietzsche's anti-moralism for a conference in Britain in 2010. For the 2010 Summer he taught in Istanbul.

In 2010, he gave the lead-off lecture at a conference in England on Nietzsche's Postmoralism and the keynote address in German, titled Lob der Illusion (In Praise of Illusion), at a conference in Germany.

== Ph.D. Students ==
Soll served as Ph.D. Dissertation Advisor to these students:

- Maudemarie Clark (Ph.D. 1976) - Nietzsche's Attack On Morality
- Robert Good (Ph.D. 1978) - Sartre's Theory Of The Other
- Steven Weiss (Ph.D. 1989) - Human, All-Too-Human: Nietzsche's Early Genealogical Method
- Judith Norman (Ph.D. 1995) - The Idea Of Intellectual Intuition From Kant To Hegel
- Robert Horton (Ph.D. 1996) - Overcoming Kant's Legacy: Schopenhauer's Theories Of Action, Will And Reason
- Theodore Kinnaman (Ph.D. 1996) - The Origins Of Kant's Critique Of Judgment
- Gil Shepard (Ph.D. 1999) - Schopenhauer's Metaphysics Of The Will

== Partial bibliography ==
=== Original works ===
- An introduction to Hegel's metaphysics. Chicago : University of Chicago Press. 1969. ISBN 978-0-226-76794-9.

=== Articles, book chapters, and introductions ===
- "Reflections on Recurrence: A Re-Examination of Nietzsche's Doctrine, die Ewige Wiederkehr des Gleichen" Nietzsche: A Collection of Critical Essays By Robert C. Solomon (Garden City, N.Y. : Anchor Press, 1973)
- "Sartre's Rejection of the Freudian Unconscious," in Paul A. Schilpp, ed., The Philosophy of Jean-Paul Sartre, Vol. XVI (La Salle, Ill.: The Library of Living Philosophers, 1981) pp. 582–604.
- Goethe, Kant, and Hegel: Discovering the Mind, Vol. 1 by Walter Kaufmann (Editor), Ivan Soll (Introduction)
- Nietzsche, Heidegger, and Buber: Discovering the Mind, Vol. 2 by Walter Kaufmann (Editor), Ivan Soll (Introduction)
- Freud, Adler, and Jung: Discovering the Mind, Vol. 3 by Walter Kaufmann (Editor), Ivan Soll (Introduction)
- "Pessimism and the Tragic View of Life: Reconsiderations of Nietzsche's Birth of Tragedy," Reading Nietzsche By Robert C. Solomon, Kathleen M. Higgins (Oxford University Press, 1990)
- "Nietzsche on Cruelty, Asceticism, and the Failure of Hedonism," Nietzsche, Genealogy, Morality: Essays on Nietzsche's Genealogy of Morals By Richard Schacht (University of California Press, 1994)
- "Schopenhauer, Nietzsche and the Redemption of Life Through Art," Willing and Nothingness: Schopenhauer as Nietzsche's Educator By Christopher Janaway (Oxford University Press, 1998)
- "Nietzsche on the Illusions of Everyday Experience," Nietzsche's Postmoralism: Essays on Nietzsche's Prelude to Philosophy's Future By Richard Schacht (Cambridge University Press, 2001)
- "Attitudes toward Life: the Existential Project of Nietzsche's Philosophy," International Studies in Philosophy (2002)
- "On the Death of the Author: A Premature, Postmodern Postmortem," The Dialogue, Yearbook of Philosophical Hermeneutics (2002)
