= Franz Overbeck =

German Protestant theologian (1837-1905)

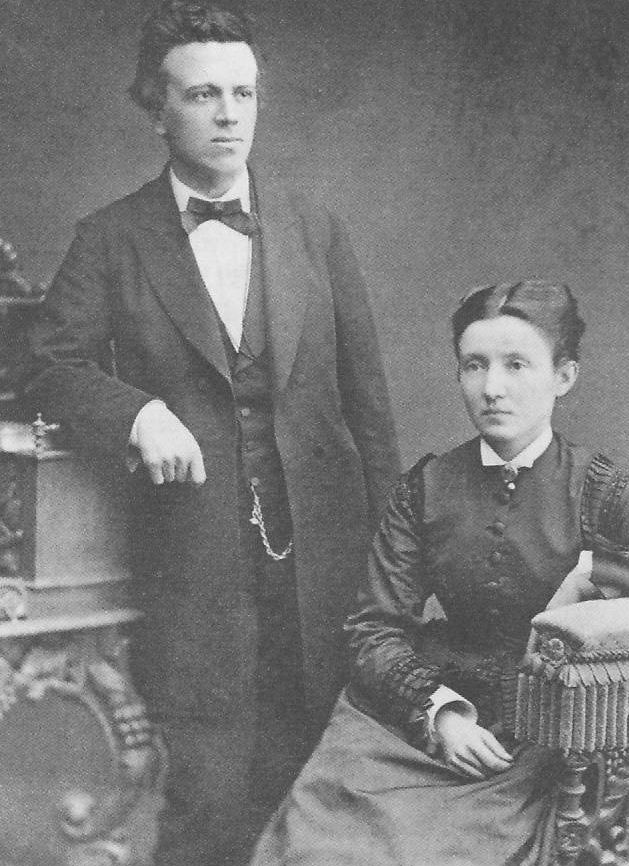
- Franz Overbeck with his wife Ida, ca. 1875
- Born: Franz Camille Overbeck; 16 November 1837; Saint Petersburg, Russia
- Died: 26 June 1905 (aged 67); Basel, Switzerland

Franz Camille Overbeck (16 November 1837 – 26 June 1905) was a Russian-born German Protestant theologian. In Anglo-American discourse, he is perhaps best known in regard to his friendship with Friedrich Nietzsche; in German theological circles, Overbeck remains discussed for his own contributions.

== Life ==
=== Youth ===
Franz Overbeck was born in Saint Petersburg as a German citizen to Franz Heinrich Herrmann Overbeck, a German-British merchant, and his wife, Jeanne Camille Cerclet, who was born in Saint Petersburg to a French family. Consequently, his upbringing was European and humanistic: first taking place in Saint Petersburg, then in Paris from 1846 until the February Revolution of 1848, once again in Saint Petersburg, and after 1850 in Dresden. This international education helped him gain fluency in the most important European languages.

From 1856 until 1864, Overbeck studied theology in Leipzig, Göttingen, Berlin, and Jena. Primarily through the lectures of Karl Schwarz and in conjunction with the historical theology of Ferdinand Christian Baur, his studies situated him at the beginning of academic criticism against the official theology. In 1859, he received his doctorate degree, after which he worked on his Habilitation on Hippolytus until 1864. After 1864, he taught as a Privatdozent in Jena.

During his student time in Leipzig, he became close friends with Heinrich von Treitschke, and in Göttingen, Overbeck had become a member of Burschenschaft Hannovera.

=== Theologian in Basel ===
In 1870, Overbeck became professor of New Testament Exegesis and Old Church History at the University of Basel. From that time until 1875, he lived in the same house (one floor under) as his colleague Friedrich Nietzsche, the Professor of Classical Philology at the same university. During this time, the housemates developed a friendship that would remain crucial for each other.

In 1873, Overbeck published his most important work 'How Christian is Our Present-Day Theology?' (Über die Christlichkeit unserer heutigen Theologie), in which he argued that the "historical" Christianity, as developed by the fathers of the church, neither did nor could have to do with the original ideas of Christ. He observed that early Christianity had opposed itself to every type of history, culture, and science, which made a "Christian theology" impossible. In this work, Overbeck criticized the conservative ("apologetic") theology, which stuck dogmatically to doctrines, as much as the "liberal" theology, which asserted that belief and knowledge could be reconciled. According to Overbeck, both failed to capture an essence of Christianity, which excludes every type of scientific knowledge.

This work was primarily incited by David Strauss's The Old and New Faith (Vom alten und neuen Glauben, 1872) and Paul de Lagarde's 'On the Relationship of the German State to Theology, Church, and Religion' ('Über das Verhältnis des deutschen Staates zu Theologie, Kirche und Religion', 1873). Both authors attempted to shape a modern Christian religion with the help of theological scholarship. Overbeck regarded this project as impossible and fundamentally in error. In his afterword for the second edition in 1903, he renewed this critique against theologian Adolf von Harnack and his work 'The Essence of Christianity' ('Das Wesen des Christentums', 1900).

The publication of this book practically destroyed all his chances to become professor at a German university. He remained in Basel, and for more than ten years, he held the same introductory lecture without addressing his provocative theses.

In private, Overbeck made voluminous notes for a 'Church Lexicon' (Kirchenlexikon), in which he develops personal accounts, principally theological but also political, cultural, philosophical, and a literature bibliography with commentary. The goal of this collection fulfilled the only purpose Overbeck saw for a scholarly theologian: a profane history of the church. Exactly what Christianity itself would not explain or could not understand, moreover what it would deny, Overbeck documented, thereby demonstrating his primary dilemma: that a "Christian theology" is impossible.

In 1876, Overbeck married Ida Rothpletz, and for one year was Rector of the University of Basel.

=== Friendship with Nietzsche ===
'How Christian is Our Present-Day Theology?' was published at the same time as the first of Nietzsche's Untimely Meditations. Both writings were critical of David Strauss and shared similar main theses. Although these were the only books Nietzsche and Overbeck published together, theses similar to Overbeck's can be found in Nietzsche's writings through 'The Antichrist'.

After Nietzsche left Basel in 1879, he and Overbeck continued a personal friendship through regular correspondence. In a letter from 1881, Nietzsche wrote to Overbeck:

My dear friend, what is this our life? A boat that swims in the sea, and all one knows for certain about it is that one day it will capsize. Here we are, two good old boats that have been faithful neighbors, and above all your hand has done its best to keep me from 'capsizing'! Let us then continue our voyage -- each for the other's sake, for a long time yet, a long time! We should miss each other so much! Tolerably calm seas and good winds and above all sun -- what I wish for myself, I wish for you, too, and am sorry that my gratitude can find expression only in such a wish and has no influence at all on wind or weather.

At the beginning of January 1889, Nietzsche sent letters to friends that exhibited symptoms of a mental collapse. After Overbeck received such a letter, he travelled to Turin the same day to retrieve the sick Nietzsche and his manuscripts. He continued to visit Nietzsche until the latter's death in 1900.

To remain sincere to his friend, Overbeck maintained a critical distance from the content of Nietzsche's writings, and denounced the beginnings of a hero-worship and revisionism. He refused to cooperate with Elisabeth Förster-Nietzsche and her Nietzsche-Archiv and, mostly in private notes and letters, accused her of misinterpreting Nietzsche. He refused to give her his correspondence with Nietzsche - which turned out to be right, as she would forge other correspondents' letters.

=== Old age and legacy ===
After long periods of sickness, in 1897 Overbeck became an emeritus professor, and in the following year, noticeably weakened, he gave up this honorary appointment at Basel. In 1903 and after long hesitation, he accepted an honorary doctorate degree from the University of St Andrews. In 1905, Franz Overbeck died in Basel.

After his death, Elisabeth Förster-Nietzsche continued to pursue Overbeck and his reputation. In 1907, she revived a campaign against him, which in turn was rebuffed by his wife Ida and his longtime friend Carl Albrecht Bernoulli.

It was not until several decades after Overbeck's death that his (anti-)theological views were taken seriously, notably by Karl Barth, Karl Löwith, and Martin Heidegger. Since c. 1980, interest in Overbeck has grown, at least in German academic circles, as is shown by the increasing number of publications in that country.

== Works ==
Although a critical edition of Overbeck's publications (including many of his notes for his lexicon) has been published in Germany, few of his writings have been available in English translation until recently. However, there are now two English translations of 'Über die Christlichkeit unserer heutigen Theologie':

- 'On the Christianity of Theology', trans. by John Elbert Wilson, Pickwick Publications, 2002, ISBN 1-55635-040-6
- 'How Christian is Our Present-Day Theology?', trans. by Martin Henry, T & T Clark/Continuum, 2005, ISBN 0-567-08429-9

== Bibliography ==
- Martin Henry, "Review Article: Franz Overbeck: A Review of Recent Literature (Part 1)," Irish Theological Quarterly, 72,4 (2007), 391–404; "(Part 2)," ibid., 73,1-2 (2008), 174–191.
- Rudolf Brändle, Ekkehard W. Stegemann (ed.), Franz Overbecks unerledigte Anfragen an das Christentum (Kaiser, Munich 1988) ISBN 3-459-01755-4.
- Andreas Urs Sommer, Der Geist der Historie und das Ende des Christentums. Zur "Waffengenossenschaft" von Friedrich Nietzsche und Franz Overbeck (Akademie-Verlag, Berlin 1997) ISBN 3-05-003112-3.
- Martin D. Henry, Franz Overbeck: Theologian? Religion and History in the Thought of Franz Overbeck (Lang, Bern 1995) ISBN 0-8204-2926-0.
- Cornelis (Kees) Kok, 'Onmogelijk geloof. De onbeantwoorde vragen van Franz Overbeck', Amsterdam 2018, 30 p. ISBN 9789461644473
