= The Antichrist (book) =

1895 book by Friedrich Nietzsche

- Author: Friedrich Nietzsche
- Original title: Der Antichrist
- Language: German
- Subject: Christianity, Jesus, democracy, elitism, morality, plutocracy, Saint Paul
- Publication date: 1895
- Publication place: Germany
- Preceded by: The Twilight of the Idols (1888)
- Followed by: Ecce Homo (1888)

The Antichrist (German: Der Antichrist) (Note: The German title is commonly translated as The Anti-Christ. (See Friedrich Nietzsche. 1990. The Anti-Christ, translated by R. J. Hollingdale, with introduction by M. Tanner. Penguin Books. ISBN 0-14-044514-5.) While in German "Christ" can refer either to Jesus ("the Christ") or his followers ("Christian") and thus the word "Der Antichrist" could be conceived as The Anti-Christian, the title is an established term referring to "The Antichrist", an eschatological opponent of Jesus Christ.) is a book by the philosopher Friedrich Nietzsche, originally published in 1895.

Although the work was written in 1888, its content made Franz Overbeck and Heinrich Köselitz delay its publication, along with Ecce Homo.

== Content ==
=== Preface ===
Nietzsche claims in the preface to have written the book for a very limited readership. To understand the book, he asserts that the reader "must be honest in intellectual matters to the point of hardness to so much as endure my seriousness, my passion". He disregards all other readers:

Very well, then! of that sort only are my readers, my true readers, my readers foreordained: of what account are the rest?—The rest are merely humanity.—One must make one's self superior to humanity, in power, in loftiness of soul,—in contempt.

=== Decadent values ===
In section 1, Nietzsche expresses his dissatisfaction with modernity, listing his dislikes for the contemporary "lazy peace", "cowardly compromise", "tolerance" and "resignation".

Nietzsche introduces his concept of the will to power in § 2, using its relation to define notions of good, bad and happiness:

What is good?—Whatever augments the feeling of power, the will to power, power itself, in man. What is evil?—Whatever springs from weakness. What is happiness?—The feeling that power increases—that resistance is overcome.

Nietzsche follows this passage with provocative and shocking language:

The weak and the botched shall perish: first principle of our charity. And one should help them to it. What is more harmful than any vice?—Practical sympathy for the botched and the weak—Christianity....

This is an example of Nietzsche's reaction against Schopenhauer, who had based all morality on compassion. Nietzsche, on the contrary, praises "virtue free of moralic acid".

Nietzsche goes on to say that mankind, out of fear, has bred a weak, sick type of human. He blames Christianity for demonizing strong, higher humans. Blaise Pascal, he claims, was an intellectually strong man who was depraved by Christianity's teaching of original sin.

Mankind, according to Nietzsche, is corrupt and its highest values are depraved. He asserts that "all the values in which mankind at present summarizes its highest desiderata are decadence values". Mankind is depraved because it has lost its instincts and prefers what is harmful to it:

I consider life itself instinct for growth, for durability, for accumulation of forces, for power: where the will to power is lacking there is decline.

Depravity results because "nihilistic values dominate under the holiest names".

=== Christian pity ===
Christianity, as a religion of peace, is despised by Nietzsche. According to Nietzsche's account, pity has a depressive effect, loss of vitality and strength, and is harmful to life. It also preserves that which should naturally be destroyed.

In Arthur Schopenhauer's philosophy, which Nietzsche sees as the most nihilistic and opposed to life, pity is the highest virtue of all. But, for Nietzsche:

[I]n the role of protector of the miserable, it is a prime agent in the promotion of décadence—pity persuades to extinction.... Of course, one doesn't say "extinction": one says "the other world," or "God," or "the true life," or Nirvana, salvation, blessedness.... This innocent rhetoric, from the realm of religious-ethical balderdash, appears a good deal less innocent when one reflects upon the tendency that it conceals beneath sublime words: the tendency to destroy life. Schopenhauer was hostile to life: that is why pity appeared to him as a virtue.

He goes on further, mentioning that the moderns Leo Tolstoy and Richard Wagner adopted Schopenhauer's viewpoint. Aristotle, who lived in 384–322 BC, on the other hand, recognized the unhealthiness of pity and prescribed tragedy as a purgative.

=== Scientific method ===
Nietzsche considers a free spirit to be the embodiment of a transvaluation of all values. Nietzsche claims that, prior to his time, the scientific method of searching for truth and knowledge was met with scorn and derision. A quiet, cautious, modest manner was seen with contempt.

=== Christian God ===
Nietzsche claims that the Christian religion and its morality are based on imaginary fictions. Nietzsche opposes the Christian concept of God because:

God degenerated into the contradiction of life. Instead of being its transfiguration and eternal Yea! In him war is declared on life, on nature, on the will to live! God becomes the formula for every slander upon the "here and now," and for every lie about the "beyond"!

Recalling Schopenhauer's description of the denial of the will to live and the subsequent empty nothingness, Nietzsche proclaims of the Christian God that "[i]n him nothingness is deified, and the will to nothingness is made holy!..."

Nietzsche criticizes the "strong races of northern Europe" for accepting the Christian God and not creating a new god of their own: "Two thousand years have come and gone—and not a single new god!". He maintains that the traditional "pitiful god of Christian monotono-theism" supports "all the instincts of décadence, all the cowardices and wearinesses of the soul find their sanction!"

=== Buddhism vs Christianity ===
Although he views both Christianity and Buddhism as "religions of décadence", Nietzsche considers the latter to be more realistic as it poses as its aim the avoidance of suffering rather than the avoidance of sin.

Nietzsche claims that Buddhism is "beyond good and evil" because it has developed past the "self-deception that lies in moral concepts".

=== Origin of Christianity ===
==== Jewish priesthood ====
Jewish, and subsequently—to a greater degree—Christian, priests survived and attained power by siding with decadents, Nietzsche claims. They turned against the natural world. Their "instincts of ressentiment" against those who were well–constituted led them to "invent an other world in which the acceptance of life appeared as the most evil and abominable thing imaginable".

To survive, the Jewish priests made use of the decadents and their large population. The Jews were not decadents, themselves—they are the "very opposite". Rather, according to Nietzsche, they have "the most powerful national will to live, that has ever appeared on earth". However, "they have simply been forced into appearing" as decadents, to "put themselves at the head of all décadent movements (—for example, the Christianity of Paul—), and so make of them something stronger than any party frankly saying Yes to life".

===== Five stages of denaturalizing values =====
1. Israel's Yahweh/Jahveh "was an expression of its consciousness of power, its joy in itself, its hopes for itself". Because he is their God, they considered him to be the God of justice. The Jews affirmed themselves, realized their own power, and had a good conscience. Even after internal anarchy and Assyrian invasions weakened Israel, it retained its worship of God as a king who is both soldier and judge.
2. Concept of God is falsified: Yahweh became a demanding god. "Jahveh, the god of "justice"—he is in accord with Israel no more, he no longer vizualizes the national egoism".
3. Concept of morality is falsified: morality is no longer an expression of life and growth. Rather, it opposes life by presenting wellbeing as a dangerous temptation. The public notion of this God becomes weaponized by clerical agitators, who "interpret all happiness as a reward and all unhappiness as a punishment for obedience or disobedience to him, for 'sin'".
4. History of Israel is falsified: The great epoch becomes an epoch of decay. "the Exile, with its long series of misfortunes, was transformed into a punishment for that great age—during which priests had not yet come into existence". The past is translated into religious terms; it was a record of guilt, punishment, piety, and reward in relation to Yahweh. A moral world order is established which assigns value to actions that obey the will of God (and which claims that this general will, i.e. the right way of life for everyone, is eternal and unchanging). Priests teach that "the ruling power of the will of God, expressed as punishment and reward according to the degree of obedience, is demonstrated in the destiny of a nation, of an individual".
5. God's will is revealed in the holy scripture: the sacred book formulates the will of God and specifies what is to be given to the priests (Nietzsche is referring here to the Pentateuch, which he believes were created by the priestly class during the Babylonian exile and falsely described as a revelation which had been given to Moses). The priest sanctifies and bestows all value: disobedience of God (the priest) is "sin"; subjection to God (the priest) is redemption. Priests use "sin" to gain and hold power:
  From this time forward things were so arranged that the priest became indispensable everywhere; at all the great natural events of life, at birth, at marriage, in sickness, at death, not to say at the sacrifice' (that is, at meal-times), the holy parasite put in his appearance, and proceeded to denaturize it.

==== Revolt against Jewish priesthood ====
The Jewish church opposed and negated nature, reality, and the world as being sinful and unholy. Christianity then negated the Jewish church and its holy, chosen people, according to Nietzsche:

The phenomenon is of the first order of importance: the small insurrectionary movement which took the name of Jesus of Nazareth is simply the Jewish instinct redivivus—in other words, it is the priestly instinct come to such a pass that it can no longer endure the priest as a fact; it is the discovery of a state of existence even more fantastic than any before it, of a vision of life even more unreal than that necessary to an ecclesiastical organization.

The Jewish church and the Jewish nation received this rebellion as a threat to its existence:

The insurrection said to have been led (whether rightly or wrongly) by Jesus... this saintly anarchist, who aroused the people of the abyss, the outcasts and "sinners," the Chandala of Judaism, to rise in revolt against the established order of things... this man was certainly a political criminal.... This is what brought him to the cross.... He died for his own sins...

==== The Redeemer type ====
Nietzsche criticizes Ernest Renan's attribution of the concepts genius and hero to Jesus. Nietzsche thinks that the word idiot best describes Jesus.

Nietzsche asserts that the psychological reality of redemption was a "new way of life, not a new faith". It is "[t]he deep instinct which prompts the Christian how to live so that he will feel that he is 'in heaven'". The authentic follower of Jesus should known by his acts. He offers no resistance to evil, He has no anger and wants no revenge. Blessedness is not promised on conditions, as in Judaism. The Gospel's glad tidings are that there is no distinction between God and man. There is no Judaic concern for sin, prayers, rituals, forgiveness, repentance, guilt, punishment, or faith:

[H]e knew that it was only by a way of life that one could feel one's self "divine", "blessed", "evangelical", a "child of God". Not by "repentance", not by "prayer and forgiveness" is the way to God: only the Gospel way leads to God—it is itself "God"!

=== History of Christianity ===
==== Opposite development ====
Nietzsche sees a world–historical irony in the way that the Christian Church developed in antithetical opposition to the Evangel and the Gospel of early Christianity.

A sickly barbarism finally lifts itself to power as the church—the church, that incarnation of deadly hostility to all honesty, to all loftiness of soul, to all discipline of the spirit, to all spontaneous and kindly humanity.—Christian values—noble values.

Nietzsche distinguishes the Gospel (the "Glad Tidings" preached by Jesus) from the four Gospels, which he sees as "evidence of the corruption already persistent within the primitive community" and as containing a largely false account of Jesus' ministry:

As an artistic triumph in psychological corruption,the gospels, in fact, stand alone. The Bible as a whole is not to be compared to them...this positive genius for conjuring up a delusion of personal "holiness" unmatched anywhere else, either in books or by men; this elevation of fraud in word and attitude to the level of an art...the underlying will to make use only of such concepts, symbols and attitudes as fit into priestly practice, the instinctive repudiation of every other mode of thought, and every other method of estimating values and utilities.

==== Paul and the promise of eternal life ====
The apostles claimed that Jesus' death was a sacrifice of an innocent man for the sins of the guilty. But "Jesus himself had done away with the very concept of "guilt", he denied that there was any gulf fixed between God and man; he lived this unity between God and man, and that was precisely his 'glad tidings'"

To assert that there is life after death, the apostles ignored Jesus' example of blessed living. Paul emphasizes the concept of immortality in First Corinthians 15:17, as Nietzsche explains:

St. Paul...gave a logical quality to that conception, that indecent conception, in this way: "If Christ did not rise from the dead, then all our faith is in vain!"—And at once there sprang from the Gospels the most contemptible of all unfulfillable promises, the shameless doctrine of personal immortality.... Paul even preached it as a reward....

Paul used the promise of life after death as a way to seize tyrannical power over the masses of lower-class people. This changed Christianity from a peace movement that achieves actual happiness into a religion whose final judgment offers possible resurrection and eternal life. Paul falsified the history of Christianity, the history of Israel, and the history of mankind by making them all seem to be a preparation for the crucifixion. "The vast lie of personal immortality destroys all reason, all natural instinct—henceforth, everything in the instincts that is beneficial, that fosters life and that safeguards the future is a cause of suspicion".

Nietzsche claims that Paul's pretense of holiness and his use of priestly concepts were typically Jewish. Christianity separated itself from Judaism as though it was the chosen religion, "just as if the Christian were the meaning, the salt, the standard and even the last judgment of all the rest".

Nietzsche is particularly opposed to the Christian notion of "equality of all souls before God", which laid the foundation for egalitarianism and eroded the great aristocracies of the past.

The poisonous doctrine, "equal rights for all," has been propagated as a Christian principle: out of the secret nooks and crannies of bad instinct Christianity has waged a deadly war upon all feelings of reverence and distance between man and man, which is to say, upon the first prerequisite to every step upward, to every development of civilization—out of the ressentiment of the masses it has forged its chief weapons...let us not underestimate the fatal influence that Christianity has had, even upon politics! Nowadays no one has courage any more for special rights, for the right of dominion, for feelings of honourable pride in himself and his equals—for the pathos of distance....

For Nietzsche, "wrong never lies in unequal rights; it lies in the assertion of 'equal' rights".

==== The Holy Lie and belief ====
Lying, or not wanting to see as one sees, is a trait of those who are devoted to a party or faction. Lying is used by all priests, be they pagan, Jewish, or Christian:

[T]he right to lie and the shrewd dodge of "revelation" belong to the general priestly type.... The "law", the "will of God", the "holy book", and "inspiration"—all these things are merely words for the conditions under which the priest comes to power and with which he maintains his power...

=== Condemnation ===
Nietzsche concludes his work with the insistence that Christianity "turned every value into worthlessness, and every truth into a lie, and every integrity into baseness of soul.... [I]t lives by distress; it creates distress to make itself immortal".

"To breed out of humanitas a self-contradiction, an art of self-pollution, a will to lie at any price, an aversion and contempt for all good and honest instincts", in Nietzsche's view, is the spirit of Christianity. Nietzsche believes the "'humanitarianism' of Christianity" to be a conspiracy "against health, beauty, well-being, intellect, kindness of soul—against life itself".

Nietzsche suggests that time be calculated from "today", the date of this book, whereby "Year One" would begin on 30 September 1888—"The transvaluation of all values!"

== Thoughts on Jesus ==
In his earlier works, Nietzsche did not distinguish the teachings of Jesus from historic Christianity. However, in late 1887 and early 1888, he analyzed Tolstoy's essay What I Believe. Nietzsche's view of Jesus in The Antichrist follows Tolstoy in separating Jesus from the Church and emphasizing the concept of "nonresistance", but uses it as a basis for his own development of the "psychology of the Savior".

Nietzsche does not demur of Jesus, conceding that he was the only one true Christian. He presents a Christ whose own inner life consisted of "wit, the blessedness of peace, of gentleness, the inability to be an enemy".

Nietzsche heavily criticizes the organized institution of Christianity and its class of priests. Christ's evangelism consisted of the good news that the "kingdom of God" is within you: "What is the meaning of 'Glad Tidings'?—The true life, the life eternal has been found—it is not merely promised, it is here, it is in you; it is the life that lies in love free from all retreats and exclusions", whereby sin is abolished and away from "all keeping of distances" between man and God.

"What the 'glad tidings' tell us is simply that there are no more contradictions; the kingdom of heaven belongs to children".

== Publication ==
=== Title ===
The German title, Der Antichrist, is ambiguous and open to two interpretations: the Antichrist, or the Anti-Christian. However, its use within the work generally admits only an "Anti-Christian" meaning. H. L. Mencken's 1918 translation and R. J. Hollingdale's 1968 translation both title their editions as "The Anti-Christ"; and Walter Kaufmann uses "The Antichrist", while no major translation uses "The Anti-Christian". Kaufmann considers The Antichrist the more appropriate way to render the German: "[a] translation of the title as 'The Antichristian' [...] overlooks that Nietzsche plainly means to be as provocative as possible". (Note: Kaufmann, Walter. 1974. Nietzsche: Philosopher, Psychologist, Antichrist (4th ed.). Princeton: Princeton University Press. pg. 7: "... in 1888, Nietzsche had abandoned the entire project of The Will to Power. Some previous drafts had called for the subtitle, "Attempt at a Revaluation of All Values"; and Nietzsche, who now proposed to write a different magnum opus, decided on the title Revaluation of All Values—and actually finished the first quarter: the Antichrist... Moreover, the Antichrist, however provocative, represents a more single-minded and sustained inquiry than any of Nietzsche's other books and thus suggests that the major work of which it constitutes Part I was not meant to consist of that maze of incoherent, if extremely interesting, observations which have since been represented as his crowning achievement [i.e., The Will to Power.]")

=== Sanity ===
This book was written shortly before Nietzsche's infamous nervous breakdown in 1889. However, as one scholar notes, "the Antichrist is unrelievedly vituperative, and would indeed sound insane were it not informed in its polemic by a structure of analysis and a theory of morality and religion worked out elsewhere".

== Suppressed passages ==
=== "The word idiot" ===
Section 29 originally contains three words that were suppressed by Nietzsche's sister in 1895: "das Wort Idiot" or, "the word idiot". H. L. Mencken's English translation does not contain these words. However, in 1931, the words were reinstated by Josef Hofmiller. Likewise, English translations by Walter Kaufmann and R.J. Hollingdale also contain them. According to Kaufmann, Nietzsche was referring to Dostoevsky's book The Idiot and its naïve protagonist. The passage reads:

Unser ganzer Begriff, unser Cultur-Begriff "Geist" hat in der Welt, in der Jesus lebt, gar keinen Sinn. Mit der Strenge des Physiologen gesprochen, wäre hier ein ganz andres Wort eher noch am Platz: das Wort Idiot

— KSA 6, pp. 200
Translation:

Our whole concept, our cultural concept "spirit" had no meaning whatever in the world Jesus lived in. To speak with the precision of the physiologist a quite different word would rather be in place here: the word idiot

— translated by R. J. Hollingdale, 1968

=== Christ's words to the thief on the cross ===
In § 35, Nietzsche wanted to convey the idea that, to Christ, Heaven is a subjective state of mind. (Note: Cf. Nietzsche, The Antichrist: "True life, eternal life is found — it is not promised, it is here, it is within you..." (§ 29).; "'The kingdom of God is within you'" (§ 29). This is a reference to Luke 17:21.; "The 'kingdom of Heaven' is a condition of the heart..." (§ 34).; "The 'kingdom of God' is not something one waits for; it has no yesterday or tomorrow, it does not come 'in a thousand years' — it is an experience within a heart..." (§ 34).; "His words to the thief on the cross contain the whole Evangel. 'That was verily a divine man, a child of God' — says the thief. 'If thou feelest this' — answers the redeemer — 'thou art in Paradise...'" (§ 35).) To accomplish this goal, Nietzsche parodied a passage from the New Testament, which the Nietzsche Archive, headed by Elisabeth Förster-Nietzsche, decided to suppress so that there would be no doubt as to the strict correctness of Nietzsche's use of the Bible. (Note: From the English translation of The Antichrist as shown on The Nietzsche Channel: "Nietzsche refers to the conversion of one of the two thieves crucified with Jesus, which is only reported in the tale of suffering" by Luke (23: 39–43; cf. Matthew 27:44; Mark 15:31–32). "However, the words which Nietzsche puts into the mouth of the thief are those of the captain after Christ's death" (cf. Luke 23:47; Matthew. 27:54; Mark 15:39). "Perhaps the Nietzsche-Archive didn't want to see the 'cohesiveness of the Bible' disputed by Nietzsche, hence the suppression of this part" (cf. Hofmiller, Josef. November 1931. Nietzsche, 'Süddeutsche Monatshefte'. p. 94ff).)

According to Nietzsche, one of the thieves, who was also being crucified, said, "This was truly a divine man, a child of God!" Nietzsche had Christ reply, "If you feel this, you are in Paradise, you are a child of God". (Note: Nietzsche, Friedrich. [1901] 1968. Will to Power, edited by Walter Kaufmann. Vintage Books. §162: "When even the criminal undergoing a painful death declares: 'the way this Jesus suffers and dies, without rebelling, without enmity, graciously, resignedly, is the only right way,' he has affirmed the gospel: and with that he is in Paradise—") In the Bible, only Luke related a dialogue between Christ and the thief in which the thief said, "This man has done nothing wrong" to which, Christ replies, "Today I tell you, you will be with me in Paradise". Nietzsche had the thief speaking the words that the centurion later spoke in Luke 23:47, Matthew 27:54, and Mark 15:39. In these passages, Christ was called the 'Son of God' by the soldier. The Nietzsche Archives' suppression was lifted in later editions and now appears exactly as Nietzsche wrote.

The full passage reads:

Die Worte zum Schächer am Kreuz enthalten das ganze Evangelium. 'Das ist wahrlich ein göttlicher Mensch gewesen, ein "Kind Gottes" sagt der Schächer. "Wenn du dies fühlst – antwortet der Erlöser — so bist du im Paradiese, so bist auch du ein Kind Gottes...

— KSA 6, pp. 207–08
Translation:

His words to the thief on the cross contain the whole Evangel. "That was verily a divine man, a child of God!" — says the thief. "If thou feelst this" — answers the redeemer — thou art in Paradise, thou art a child of God.

— translated by R. J. Hollingdale, 1968

=== A young prince ===
In § 38, there is a reference to a young prince who professes to be a Christian but acts in a very worldly manner. The passage about this was suppressed to avoid comparison to Wilhelm II. According to Mazzino Montinari, this passage was never printed in any edition prepared by the Nietzsche Archive. However, it did appear in the pocketbook edition of 1906.

The full passage reads:

Ein junger Fürst, an der Spitze seiner Regimenter, prachtvoll als Ausdruck der Selbstsucht und Selbstüberhebung seines Volks, — aber, ohne jede Scham, sich als Christen bekennend!

— KSA 6, pp. 211
Translation:

A young prince at the head of his regiments, splendid as the expression of his people's egoism and presumption – but without any shame professing himself a Christian!

— translated by R. J. Hollingdale, 1968

=== Anno Domini ===
Nietzsche, in § 62, criticizes the reckoning of time from Christ's birth (anno Domini). This passage was judged by Franz Overbeck and Heinrich Köselitz to be unworthy of publication. According to Mazzino Montinari, this passage was restored in the 1899 edition, appearing in all subsequent editions.

The full passage reads:

Und man rechnet die Zeit nach dem dies nefastus, mit dem dies Verhängniss anhob, — nach dem ersten Tag des Christenthums! — Warum nicht lieber nach seinem letzten? — Nach Heute? — Umwerthung aller Werthe!...

— KSA 6, pp. 253
Translation:

And one calculates time from the unlucky day on which this fatality arose – from the first day of Christianity! — Why not rather from its last? — From today? Revaluation of all values!

— translated by R. J. Hollingdale, 1968

=== Decree against Christianity ===
Also suppressed was Nietzsche's "Decree against Christianity" (or "Law Against Christianity"). This part was added back on the 1889 edition and the following editions of The Antichrist. This part consists of seven propositions that can be summarised as such:

1. Priests should be imprisoned
2. Participation in religion is an assassination attempt on public morality
3. The location from which Christianity has spread should be eradicated
4. The preaching of chastity is a public instigation to anti-nature and should be punished
5. Priests are chandalas – anyone who associates with them should be ostracized and starved
6. What was before called "holy" and "God" is to be called criminal and cursed
7. "The rest follows from this"

== Bibliography ==
- Danto, Arthur. 2005. Nietzsche as Philosopher: Expanded Edition, Columbia. ISBN 978-0-231-13519-1.
- Kaufmann, Walter. 1974. Nietzsche: Philosopher, Psychologist, Antichrist. Princeton: Princeton University Press. ISBN 0-691-01983-5.
- Nietzsche, Friedrich. [1889] 1991. The Twilight of the Idols and The Anti-Christ, translated by R. J. Hollingdale. London: Penguin Books. ISBN 0-14-044514-5.
- Schopenhauer, Arthur. [1840] 2005. On the Basis of Morality. Dover. ISBN 0-486-44653-0.
- — [1818] 1969. The World as Will and Representation I. Dover. ISBN 0-486-21761-2.
- Sommer, Andreas Urs. 2000. Friedrich Nietzsche: Der Antichrist. Ein philosophisch-historischer Kommentar. Basel. ISBN 3-7965-1098-1 — the comprehensive standard commentary on The Antichrist
