= Walter Kaufmann (philosopher) =

German-American philosopher (1921–1980)

- Walter Kaufmann, undated
- Born: July 1, 1921; Freiburg, Baden, Weimar Germany
- Died: September 4, 1980 (aged 59); Princeton, New Jersey, U.S.

Academic background
- Education: Williams College; Harvard University (MA, PhD)
- Thesis: Nietzsche's Theory of Values (1947)

Academic work
- Era: 20th-century philosophy
- Region: Western philosophy
- School or tradition: Continental philosophy Existentialism
- Institutions: Princeton University
- Main interests: Existential philosophy, philosophy of religion, tragedy and philosophy

Walter Arnold Kaufmann (German: [ˈkaʊfman]; July 1, 1921 – September 4, 1980) was a German-American philosopher, translator, and poet. A prolific author, he wrote extensively on a broad range of subjects, such as authenticity and death, moral philosophy and existentialism, theism and atheism, Christianity and Judaism, as well as philosophy and literature. He served more than 30 years as a professor at Princeton University.

He is renowned as a scholar and translator of Friedrich Nietzsche. He also wrote a 1965 book on Georg Wilhelm Friedrich Hegel and published a translation of Goethe's Faust, and Martin Buber's I and Thou.

== Biography ==
Walter Kaufmann was born in Freiburg im Breisgau, Germany, on 1 July 1921.

Kaufmann was raised a Lutheran. At age 11, finding that he believed neither in the Trinity nor in the divinity of Jesus, he converted to Judaism. Kaufmann subsequently discovered that his grandparents were all Jewish. Being both descended from Jews and a convert to Judaism placed Kaufmann in real danger in Nazi Germany. In 1939 Kaufmann emigrated to the United States and began studying at Williams College. Stanley Corngold records that there he "abandoned his commitment to Jewish ritual while developing a deeply critical attitude toward all established religions."

Kaufmann graduated from Williams College in 1941, then went to Harvard University, receiving an MA degree in Philosophy in 1942. His studies were, however, interrupted by the war. He enlisted with the US Army Air Force, was placed at Camp Ritchie and is one of many Ritchie Boys who would go on to serve as interrogators for the Military Intelligence Service in Europe. Kaufmann specifically performed interrogations in Germany.

Kaufmann became a citizen of the United States in 1944.

In 1947 he was awarded his PhD by Harvard. His dissertation, written in under a year, was titled "Nietzsche's Theory of Values." That same year he joined the Philosophy Department at Princeton University. Although he would hold visiting appointments in both the US and abroad, he would remain based at Princeton for the rest of his academic career. His students over the years included Nietzsche scholars Frithjof Bergmann, Richard Schacht, Ivan Soll and Alexander Nehamas.

Kaufmann was married to Hazel.

Kaufmann died, aged 59, on 4 September 1980.

== Philosophical work ==
In a 1959 article in Harper's Magazine, he summarily rejected all religious values and practice, including, but not especially, the liberal Protestantism of continental Europe that began with Schleiermacher and culminated in the writings of Paul Tillich and Rudolf Bultmann. In their place, he praised moralists such as the biblical prophets, the Buddha, and Socrates. He argued that critical analysis and the acquisition of knowledge were liberating and empowering forces. He forcefully criticized the fashionable liberal Protestantism of the 20th century as filled with contradictions and evasions, preferring the austerity of the book of Job and the Jewish existentialism of Martin Buber. Kaufmann discussed many of these issues in his 1958 Critique of Religion and Philosophy.

Kaufmann wrote a good deal on the existentialism of Søren Kierkegaard and Karl Jaspers. Kaufmann had great admiration for Kierkegaard's passion and his insights on freedom, anxiety, and individualism. Kaufmann wrote: "Nobody before Kierkegaard had seen so clearly that the freedom to make a fateful decision that may change our character and future breeds anxiety." Although Kaufmann did not share Kierkegaard's religious outlook and was critical of his Protestant theology, Kaufmann was nevertheless sympathetic and impressed with the depth of Kierkegaard's thinking:

I know of no other great writer in the whole nineteenth century, perhaps even in the whole of world literature, to whom I respond with less happiness and with a more profound sense that I am on trial and found wanting, unless it were Søren Kierkegaard.

Kaufmann edited the anthology Existentialism from Dostoevsky to Sartre. Kaufmann disliked Martin Heidegger's thinking, along with his unclear writing.

Kaufmann is renowned for his translations and exegesis of Nietzsche, whom he saw as gravely misunderstood by English speakers, as a major early existentialist, and as an unwitting precursor, in some respects, to Anglo-American analytic philosophy. Michael Tanner called Kaufmann's commentaries on Nietzsche "obtrusive, self-referential, and lacking insight", but Llewellyn Jones wrote that Kaufmann's "fresh insights into ... Nietzsche ... can deepen the insights of every discriminating student of literature," and The New Yorker wrote that Kaufmann "has produced what may be the definitive study of Nietzsche's ... thought—an informed, scholarly, and lustrous work."

In his Nietzsche: Philosopher, Psychologist, Antichrist (1950) Kaufmann wrote that

It is evident at once that Nietzsche is far superior to Kant and Hegel as a stylist; but it also seems that as a philosopher he represents a very sharp decline — and men have not been lacking who have not considered him a philosopher at all — because he had no “system.” Yet this argument is hardly cogent. Schelling and Hegel, Spinoza and Aquinas had their systems; in Kant’s and Plato’s case the word is far less applicable; and of the many important philosophers who very definitely did not have systems one need only mention Socrates and many of the pre-Socratics. Not only can one defend Nietzsche on this score — how many philosophers today have systems? — but one must add that he had strong philosophic reasons for not having a system.

Kaufmann also sympathized with Nietzsche's acerbic criticisms of Christianity. However, Kaufmann faulted much in Nietzsche, writing that "my disagreements with [Nietzsche] are legion." Regarding style, Kaufmann argued that Nietzsche's Thus Spoke Zarathustra, for example, is in parts badly written, melodramatic, or verbose, yet concluded that the book "is not only a mine of ideas, but also a major work of literature and a personal triumph."

Kaufmann described his own ethic and his own philosophy of living in his books, including The Faith of a Heretic (1961) and Without Guilt and Justice: From Decidophobia to Autonomy (1973). In the former work he advocated living in accordance with what he proposed as the four cardinal virtues: "humbition" (a fusion of humility and ambition), love, courage, and honesty.

== Partial bibliography ==
=== Original works ===
- (1950) Nietzsche: Philosopher, Psychologist, Antichrist
- (1958) Critique of Religion and Philosophy
- (1959) From Shakespeare to Existentialism, rev. ed. (1960), republished, with a new preface (1980)
- (1961) The Faith of a Heretic
- (1962) Cain and Other Poems
- (1965) Hegel: A Reinterpretation
- (1968) Tragedy and Philosophy
- (1973) Without Guilt and Justice: From Decidophobia to Autonomy
- (1976) Existentialism, Religion, and Death: Thirteen Essays
- (1976) Religions in Four Dimensions
- (1977) The Future of the Humanities
- (1978) Man's Lot: A Trilogy, consisting of
  - Life at the Limits
  - Time is an Artist
  - What is Man?
- Kaufmann, Walter (1980). Discovering the Mind. New York. ISBN 0-07-033311-4. OCLC 5264699.
  - vol. 1 Goethe, Kant, and Hegel
  - vol. 2 Nietzsche, Heidegger, and Buber
  - vol. 3 Freud Versus Adler and Jung

=== Translations ===
- (1958) Judaism and Christianity, essays by Leo Baeck
- (1963) Goethe's Faust (Part One and selections from Part Two)
- (1965) Hegel: Texts and Commentary
- (1970) I and Thou, by Martin Buber
- (1975) Twenty-Five German poets an extended version of Twenty German Poets (1962)

As written or published by Friedrich Nietzsche in chronological order:

- The Birth of Tragedy Or: Hellenism And Pessimism
- The Gay Science: With a Prelude in Rhymes and an Appendix of Songs
- Thus Spoke Zarathustra: A Book for All and None
- Beyond Good and Evil: Prelude to a Philosophy of the Future
- On the Genealogy of Morals (with R. J. Hollingdale)
- The Case of Wagner A Musician's Problem
- Twilight of the Idols How One Philosophizes with a Hammer
- The Antichrist
- Nietzsche contra Wagner
- Ecce Homo: How One Becomes What One Is
- The Will to Power (with R. J. Hollingdale)

=== Anthologies/edited works ===
- (1954) The Portable Nietzsche. Viking.
- (1961) Religion from Tolstoy to Camus, a companion to the preceding.
- (1961) Philosophic Classics, in two volumes:
  - v. I: Thales to Ockham, v. II: Bacon to Kant
- (1968) Basic Writings of Nietzsche
- (1970) Hegel's Political Philosophy
- (1975) Existentialism from Dostoevsky to Sartre

=== Articles, book chapters, and introductions ===
- 'Nietzsche's Admiration for Socrates", Journal of the History of Ideas, v. 9, October 1948, pp. 472–491. Earlier version: "Nietzsche's Admiration for Socrates" (Bowdoin Prize, 1947; pseud. David Dennis)
- "Goethe and the History of Ideas", Journal of the History of Ideas, v. 10, October 1949, pp. 503–516.
- "The Hegel Myth and Its Method", Philosophical Review v.60, No. 4 (October 1951), pp. 459–486.
- Review of Nietzsche and Christian Ethics by R. Motson Thompson, Philosophical Review v. 61, no. 4 (October 1952), pp. 595–599.
- "Hegel's Early Antitheological Phase", Philosophical Review v. 63, no. 1 (January 1954), pp. 3–18.
- "Nietzsche and Rilke", Kenyon Review, vol. 17, no. 1, 1955, pp. 1–22.
- "Toynbee and Superhistory", Partisan Review, vol. 22, no. 4, Fall 1955, pp. 531–541. Reprinted in Ashley Montagu, ed. (1956). Toynbee and History: Critical Essays and Reviews. Boston: Extending Horizons, Porter Sargent. ISBN 0-87558-026-2.
- "Art, Tradition, and Truth", Partisan Review, XVII, Winter 1955, pp. 9–28
- “Kierkegaard.” The Kenyon Review, vol. 18, no. 2, 1956, pp. 182–211.
- "Jaspers' Relation to Nietzsche", in Paul Schilpps, ed., The Philosophy of Karl Jaspers (New York: Tudor, 1957), pp. 407–436.
- "The Faith of a Heretic", Harper's Magazine, February 1959, pp. 33–39. Reprinted in Existentialism, Religion, and Death (New York: New American Library, 1976).
- "Existentialism and Death", Chicago Review, XIII, 1959, pp. 73–93 also in Herman Feifel (ed.) The Meaning of Death, New York: The Blakiston Division / McGraw-Hill, 1959, Revised version printed in Existentialism, Religion, and Death (New York: New American Library, 1976).
- Preface to Europe and the Jews: The Pressure of Christendom on the People of Israel for 1900 Years, 2d ed, by Malcolm Hay. Boston: Beacon Press, 1961.
- "A Philosopher's View", in Ethics and Business: Three Lectures. University Park, Pa., 1962, pp. 35–54. Originally presented at a seminar sponsored by the College of Business Administration of the Pennsylvania State University on March 19, 1962.
- "Nietzsche Between Homer and Sartre: Five Treatments of the Orestes Story", Revue Internationale de Philosophie v. 18, 1964, pp. 50–73.
- "Nietzsche in the Light of his Suppressed Manuscripts", Journal of the History of Philosophy v. 2, October 1964, pp. 205–226.
- "Buber's Religious Significance", from The Philosophy of Martin Buber, ed. P. A. Schilpp and Maurice Friedman (London: Cambridge University Press, 1967) Reprinted in Existentialism, Religion, and Death (New York: New American Library, 1976).
- "The Reception of Existentialism in the United States", Midway, vol. 9 (1) (Summer 1968), pp. 97–126. Reprinted in Existentialism, Religion, and Death (New York: New American Library, 1976).
- Foreword to Frau Lou: Nietzsche's Wayward Disciple, by Rudolph Binion. Princeton, New Jersey: Princeton University Press, 1969.
- "The Riddle of Oedipus: Tragedy and Philosophy" The Isenberg memorial lecture series, 1965-1966, 1969
- Introductory essay, Alienation Richard Schacht, Garden City, N.Y., Doubleday, 1970
- "The Future of Jewish Identity", The Jerusalem Post Magazine August 1, 1969, pp. 607. Reprinted in Congressional Bi-Weekly, April 3, 1970; in Conservative Judaism, Summer 1970; in New Theology no. 9, 1972, pp. 41–58, and in Existentialism, Religion, and Death (New York: New American Library, 1976.)
- Foreword to An Introduction to Hegel's Metaphysics, by Ivan Soll. Chicago and London: University of Chicago Press, 1969.
- "The Origin of Justice", Review of Metaphysics v. 23, December 1969, pp. 209–239.
- "Beyond Black and White", Midway, v. 10(3) (Winter 1970), pp. 49–79. Also Survey no. 73 (Autumn 1969), pp. 22–46. Reprinted in Existentialism, Religion, and Death (New York: New American Library, 1976).
- "Hegel's Ideas about Tragedy" in New Studies in Hegel's Philosophy, ed. Warren E. Steinkraus (New York: Holt, Rinehart and Winston, Inc., 1971), pp. 201–220.
- "The Death of God and the Revaluation", in Robert Solomon, ed., Nietzsche: A Collection of Critical Essays (New York: Anchor Press, 1973), pp. 9–28.
- "The Discovery of the Will to Power", in Robert Solomon, ed., Nietzsche: A Collection of Critical Essays (New York: Anchor Press, 1973), pp. 226–242.
- Foreword in Truth and Value in Nietzsche: A Study of His Metaethics and Epistemology by John T. Wilcox. Ann Arbor: University of Michigan Press, 1974
- "Nietzsche and Existentialism", Symposium: A Quarterly Journal in Modern Foreign Literatures, v. 28(1) (Spring 1974), pp. 7–16. Reprinted in Existentialism, Religion, and Death (New York: New American Library, 1976).
- "Hegel's Conception of Phenomenology" in Phenomenology and Philosophical Understanding, Edo Pivcevič, ed., pp. 211–230 (1975).
- "Unknown Feuerbach Autobiography", Times Literary Supplement 1976 (3887): 1123–1124.
- "A Preface to Kierkegaard", in Søren Kierkegaard, The Present Age and Of the Difference Between a Genius and an Apostle, trans. Alexander Dru, Harper Torchbooks, pp. 9–29. Reprinted in Existentialism, Religion, and Death (New York: New American Library, 1976).
- "On Death and Lying", Reprinted in Existentialism, Religion, and Death (New York: New American Library, 1976).
- "Letter on Nietzsche", Times Literary Supplement 1978 (3960): 203.
- "Buber's Failures and Triumph", Revue Internationale de Philosophie v. 32, 1978, pp. 441–459.
- "Buber: Of His Failures and Triumph", Encounter 52(5): 31–38 1979.
- Reply to letter, Encounter 55(4): 95 1980.

=== Sound recordings ===
- "Prof. Kaufmann discusses Sartre, Jaspers, Heidegger, Kierkegaard"
- "Kierkegaard and the Crisis in Religion" Part 1 of 3 Lectures
- "Nietzsche and the Crisis in Philosophy" Part 2 of 3 Lectures
- "Sartre and the Crisis in Morality" Part 3 of 3 Lectures
- "Oedipus Rex"
- "Homer and the Birth of Tragedy"
- "Aeschylus and the Death of Tragedy"
- "The Power of the Single Will"
- "Three Satanic Interludes, Or, 'How To Go To Hell'"
- "The Will to Power Reexamined"

== See also ==
- American philosophy
- List of American philosophers
