= Nietzsche: Philosopher, Psychologist, Antichrist =

1950 book by Walter Kaufmann

- Cover of the second edition
- Author: Walter Kaufmann
- Language: English
- Subject: Friedrich Nietzsche
- Publisher: Princeton University Press
- Publication date: 1950
- Publication place: United States
- Media type: Print (Hardcover and Paperback)
- Pages: 532 (2013 edition)
- ISBN: 978-0691160269

Nietzsche: Philosopher, Psychologist, Antichrist (1950; second edition 1956; third edition 1968; fourth edition 1974; fifth edition 2013) is a book about the German philosopher Friedrich Nietzsche by the philosopher Walter Kaufmann. The book, first published by Princeton University Press, was influential and is considered a classic study. Kaufmann has been credited with helping to transform Nietzsche's reputation after World War II by dissociating him from Nazism, and making it possible for Nietzsche to be taken seriously as a philosopher. However, Kaufmann has been criticized for presenting Nietzsche as an existentialist, and for other details of his interpretation.

== Summary ==
Kaufmann writes that he "aims at a comprehensive reconstruction of Nietzsche's thought". He attempts to discredit a "Nietzsche legend" consisting of a variety of false beliefs about Nietzsche, such as the idea that he was a "proto-Nazi". He argues that Nietzsche's sister Elisabeth Förster-Nietzsche and the poet Stefan George are among those responsible for the legend, and that the rise of Nazism helped spread misconceptions about Nietzsche. He compares Nietzsche's ideas to those of existentialism, and discusses views of Nietzsche held by the philosophers Martin Heidegger and Karl Jaspers.

Writing in a 1974 appendix, Kaufmann criticizes the philosopher Jürgen Habermas for poor scholarship in his treatment of Nietzsche in Knowledge and Human Interests (1968), noting that Habermas relied on the inadequate edition of Nietzsche's works prepared by Karl Schlechta. In a footnote, Kaufmann claims to have received a confession from minor author David George Plotkin that he had ghostwritten My Sister and I, which was published under Nietzsche's name in 1951.

== Publication history ==
Nietzsche: Philosopher, Psychologist, Antichrist was first published by Princeton University Press in 1950. A second edition was published in 1956, a third edition in 1968, and a fourth edition, which was the first paperback printing, in 1974. In 2013 an edition with a new foreword by the philosopher Alexander Nehamas was published.

== Reception ==
=== Reviews ===
Nietzsche: Philosopher, Psychologist, Antichrist received positive reviews from Walter Watson in Ethics, the philosopher Frederick Copleston in Philosophy, and, in Philosophy and Phenomenological Research, from Walter Cerf and the anthropologist H. James Birx. It was also reviewed by the historian of ideas Crane Brinton in The Germanic Review, William A. Mueller in Review & Expositor, Ernst Koch in The Modern Language Journal, Chris Terry in Times Higher Education, and by The Review of Metaphysics.

Watson considered the book one of the most important works on Nietzsche, crediting Kaufmann with thoroughly developing an "interpretation of Nietzsche's philosophy sharply at variance with the usual ones." He suggested that Kaufmann's suggestion that Socrates was "Nietzsche's idol" to be perhaps his most "startling thesis". Copleston described the book as "a most thoughtful, fair and scholarly treatment of Nietzsche's philosophy", welcoming the fact that it was free from both prejudice against and "sickening adulation" of Nietzsche. He praised Kaufmann for interpreting Nietzsche's statements in terms of both their context and the general development of Nietzsche's thought. However, he suggested that Kaufmann "plays down too much certain aspects of Nietzsche's thought". Cerf described the book as brilliant, and wrote that it caused him to re-examine the generally accepted ideas about Nietzsche he formerly held. He credited Kaufmann with exposing numerous false characterizations of Nietzsche and his views, and saw great merit in Kaufmann's discussion of Nietzsche's relation to other writers and thinkers. However, he questioned Kaufmann's understanding of the will to power, and suggested that Kaufmann overstated the extent to which the prevailing view of Nietzsche was false. Birx described the book as a "classic work", and credited Kaufmann with clearly presenting Nietzsche's life and thought, and carefully interpreting his ideas. Writing in 1977, he commented that it remained an "outstanding and indispensable contribution to Nietzschean scholarship."

=== Other evaluations ===
The sociologist Philip Rieff called Nietzsche: Philosopher, Psychologist, Antichrist the best book in English on Nietzsche. Kaufmann maintained that he had succeeded in dissociating Nietzsche from Nazism and showing that Nietzsche was a great philosopher. The philosopher Richard Rorty described the book as "path-breaking", but wrote that it had been superseded by the philosopher Richard Schacht's Nietzsche (1983), which was more comprehensive, better organized and more helpful to readers who were new to Nietzsche and needed help in understanding the apparent contradictions in Nietzsche's views. Schacht called the book important and useful, and described it as a classic study through which many English-speaking readers became interested in and acquainted with Nietzsche after World War II. He wrote that it had little competition for nearly two decades and credited Kaufmann with offering "a readable interpretation of Nietzsche's thought along humanistic existentialist and pragmatist lines". However, he criticized Kaufmann's treatment of Human, All Too Human, Daybreak (1881), and The Gay Science (1887), maintaining that Kaufmann incorrectly saw them as part of a period in Nietzsche's thought that was of little intrinsic interest. Schacht has also commented that the book was "enormously influential", but that it was oriented to "strategic considerations, relating to Nietzsche’s rehabilitation in the English-speaking world", and presented Nietzsche as an existentialist. He credited Kaufmann with correctly emphasizing that Nietzsche was a philosopher, in opposition to a once prevailing view that Nietzsche did not deserve to be so considered. He also considered Kaufmann's characterization of Nietzsche as a psychologist apt. However, he questioned Kaufmann's characterization of Nietzsche as an "Antichrist", writing that it reflected Kaufmann's personal loathing of Christianity.

The historian Peter Gay called the book "epoch making". He credited Kaufmann with "correcting horrendous misreadings and pillorying appalling mistranslations", but noted that Kaufmann's conclusions have themselves been subjected to criticism and correction by later scholarship. The historian Roy Porter described the book as "authoritative". Michael Tanner described the book as an "ill-organized transformation of Nietzsche into a liberal humanist", but acknowledged that it "had its place in the history of Nietzsche reception". The political scientist Gregory Bruce Smith credited Kaufmann with introducing Nietzsche to English-speaking audiences and exposing the inadequacy of the Nazi interpretation of the philosopher. He noted that Kaufmann's attempt to describe Nietzsche's philosophy in terms of Anglo-American philosophy helped prepare the way for many similar attempts. However, he criticized Kaufmann for ignoring political and moral aspects of Nietzsche's views and his treatment of the doctrine of the eternal recurrence.

The intellectual historian Jennifer Ratner-Rosenhagen described the book as a "monumental study". She credited Kaufmann with transforming the interpretation of Nietzsche in the postwar United States and establishing him as "a canonical thinker in the Western tradition". She wrote that the book made Kaufmann himself a "dominant figure in transatlantic Nietzsche studies from 1950 until his death in 1980", and that while he has been typically credited by philosophers and historians with saving Nietzsche's reputation by disassociating him from Nazism, they argue that he did so by "denaturing Nietzsche's philosophy of power and narrowly transforming him into an existentialist." In her view, Kaufmann "took a much more dramatic step by extending the scope of Nietzsche's philosophy, demonstrating how his ideas resonated with but also transcended the dominant philosophies of the day."

David Pickus argued that the book should be understood in relation to Jaspers's Nietzsche: An Introduction to the Understanding of His Philosophical Activity (1935), arguing that despite some differences, such as their views of the meaning of nihilism, they had much in common. He credited Kaufmann with helping make it possible to "identify irresponsible examples of Nietzsche scholarship" and initiating "a key debate about the possibility of using Nietzsche for moral “transfiguration,” particularly in historical, social, and artistic realms." Mark Alfano wrote that Kaufmann popularized the idea that Nietzsche was a virtue theorist in ethics. He maintained that Kaufmann was mistaken to argue that Nietzsche's concept of the overman is related to the Aristotelian conception of megalopsychia or "great-souled man", following the philosopher Bernd Magnus's view that there is only a "superficial connection" between the two. Nehamas described the book as a major turning point in Nietzsche's posthumous reputation. He credited Kaufmann with reversing the popular image of Nietzsche as a totalitarian anti-semite, making it possible for philosophers to take Nietzsche seriously, and ensuring that Nietzsche's works have a prominent place in the philosophy sections of modern bookstores. He observed that Kaufmann's view that Nietzsche was an heir to rationalism rather than a Romantic critic of the Enlightenment is the most controversial element of his interpretation. He concluded that there is some truth to the charge that Kaufmann, in trying to reverse the "legend" surrounding Nietzsche, went too far in the opposite direction, over-emphasizing the more acceptable aspects of Nietzsche and minimizing the problematic or disturbing aspects, but that this does not detract from Kaufmann's accomplishment. In his view, Kaufmann's selective reinterpretation of Nietzsche may have been necessary to make it possible for Nietzsche to be read seriously by both philosophers and the general public, and the book repays careful study.

The philosopher Robert B. Pippin wrote that despite the "relative success" of the book, "the reception of Nietzsche in the Anglo-American philosophical community was still in its initial, hesitant stages" even as late as 1985.

Also in 1985 Werner Stegmaier published a paper entitled Leib und Leben: Zum Hegel-Nietzsche-Problem claiming Kaufmann's attempt (Jörg Salaquarda's German translation, 1982) to subsume both, Hegel's and Nietzsche's approaches, under the formula of a “dialectical monism” had remained external to both.
