= The Dawn of Day =

1881 book by Friedrich Nietzsche

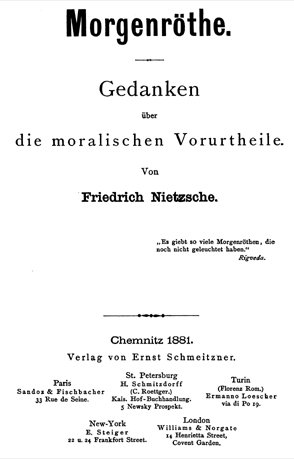
- Title page
- Author: Friedrich Nietzsche
- Original title: Morgenröthe ^{a}
- Language: German
- Publication date: 1881
- Publication place: Germany
- Preceded by: Human, All Too Human (1878)
- Followed by: Idylls from Messina (1882)

The Dawn of Day or Dawn or Daybreak (German: Morgenröte – Gedanken über die moralischen Vorurteile; historical orthography: Morgenröthe – Gedanken über die moralischen Vorurtheile; English: The Dawn of Day/ Daybreak: Thoughts on the Prejudices of Morality) is an 1881 book by the German philosopher Friedrich Nietzsche. According to the Nietzsche scholar Keith Ansell-Pearson, it is the least studied of all of Nietzsche's works. This relative obscurity is mostly due to the greater attention paid to his subsequent writings.

In his last original book Ecce Homo, Nietzsche writes that Daybreak was the "book [in which] my campaign against morality begins".

== Themes ==
Nietzsche de-emphasizes the role of hedonism as a motivator and accentuates the role of a "feeling of power". His relativism, both moral and cultural, and his critique of Christianity also reach greater maturity. In Daybreak Nietzsche devotes a lengthy passage to his criticism of Christian biblical exegesis, including its arbitrary interpretation of objects and images in the Old Testament as prefigurations of Christ's crucifixion.

The polemical, antagonistic and informal style of this aphoristic book, when compared to Nietzsche's later treatments of morality, seems to invite a particular experience. In this text Nietzsche is not concerned with persuading his readers to accept any specific point of view, yet there are prefigurations of many of the ideas more fully developed in his later books. For example, the materialism espoused in this book might seem reducible to a naïve scientific objectivism that reduces all phenomena to their natural, mechanical causes, but that is not Nietzsche's strongest perspective, which is perhaps best expressed in The Gay Science.

Nietzsche in (93) acknowledges that a universe does not come from God or a creator but physics and science. The aphorism (93) begins from the question in the gospel of John (18:38). This interpretation and development of his thought were to prove errors in dogmatic teaching of Christianity that power, not divinity, is the psychology of belief.

== Translations ==
- Volz, Johanna (1903). Dawn of the Day – via Wikisource.
- Nietzsche, Friedrich (1924). The Dawn of Day. Translated by Kennedy, J. M. George Allen And Unwin Limited.
- Daybreak: Thoughts on the Prejudices of Morality. Cambridge: Cambridge University Press. 1995. ISBN 9780521599634.
- Dawn: Thoughts on the Presumptions of Morality. Stanford: Stanford University Press. 2011. ISBN 9780804780056.

== See also ==
- Twilight of the Idols – 1889 book by Friedrich Nietzsche
- Dawn and Decline (Dämmerung) – 1934 book by Max Horkheimer
