= Andreas Urs Sommer =

German philosopher (born 1972)

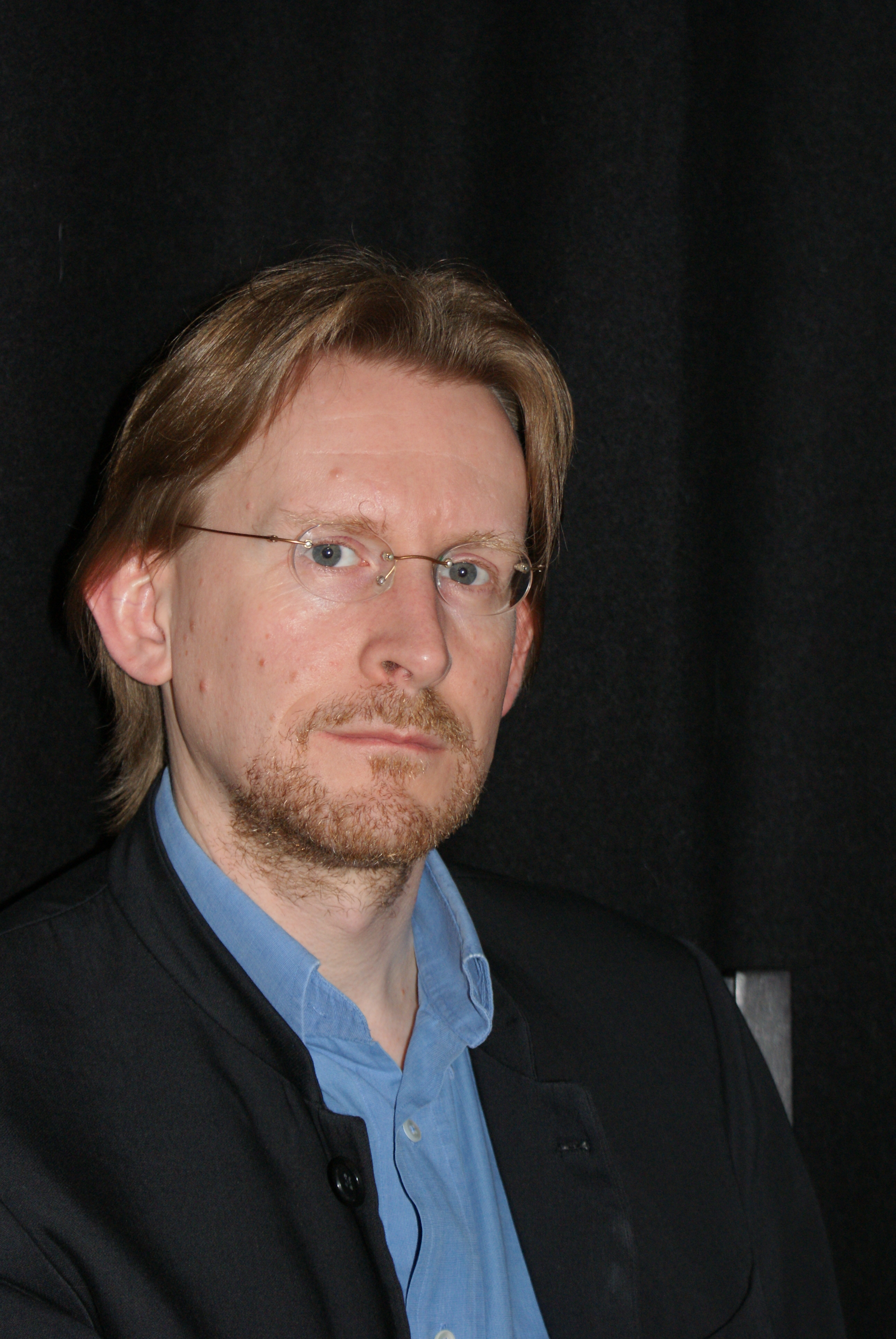
Sommer in 2012

Andreas Urs Sommer (born 14 July 1972) is a German philosopher, born in Zofingen, Switzerland. He specializes in the history of philosophy and its theory, ethics, philosophy of religion, and Skepticism. His historical studies center on the philosophy of Enlightenment and Nietzsche, but they also deal with Kant, Max Weber, Pierre Bayle, Jonathan Edwards, and others.

== Career ==
Andreas Urs Sommer studied philosophy, theology and German literature in Basel, Göttingen and Freiburg. He obtained his doctorate at Basel University in 1998, and received his Habilitation in Greifswald in 2004. He was a visiting research fellow at Princeton University in 1998/99 and a fellow at the University of London in 2000/01.

In 2008 Sommer became responsible for the "Nietzsche-Kommentar" of the Heidelberg Academy of Sciences. He was also appointed the director of the Friedrich-Nietzsche-Stiftung in Naumburg (Saale). In 2011 he became a professor for philosophy at the University of Freiburg.

Sommer also publishes in the field of numismatics.

== Bibliography ==
=== Books in German ===
- Im Spannungsfeld von Gott und Welt. Studien zu Geschichte und Gegenwart des Frey-Grynaeischen-Institutes in Basel 1747–1997. Schwabe, Basel 1997, ISBN 3-7965-1063-9.
- Der Geist der Historie und das Ende des Christentums. Zur „Waffengenossenschaft“ von Friedrich Nietzsche und Franz Overbeck. Mit einem Anhang unveröffentlichter Texte aus Overbecks „Kirchenlexicon“. Akademie Verlag, Berlin 1997, ISBN 3-05-003112-3.
- Die Hortung. Eine Philosophie des Sammelns. Parerga, Düsseldorf 2000, ISBN 3-930450-54-2.
- Existenzphilosophie und Christentum. Albert Schweitzer und Fritz Buri. Briefe 1935–1964. C. H. Beck, Munich 2000, ISBN 3-406-46730-X.
- Friedrich Nietzsches „Der Antichrist“. Ein philosophisch-historischer Kommentar. Schwabe, Basel 2000, ISBN 3-7965-1098-1 (Beiträge zu Friedrich Nietzsche. vol. 2).
- Geschichte als Trost. Isaak Iselins Geschichtsphilosophie. Schwabe, Basel 2002, ISBN 3-7965-1940-7 (Schwabe Horizonte.).
- Die Kunst, selber zu denken. Ein philosophischer Dictionnaire. Eichborn, Frankfurt am Main 2002, 2nd edition 2003 ISBN 3-8218-4521-X (Die Andere Bibliothek, vol. 214).
- Katalog der byzantinischen Münzen. Münzsammlung der Georg-August-Universität Göttingen im Archäologischen Institut. Hrsg. von Christof Boehringer. Universitätsverlag, Göttingen 2004, ISBN 3-930457-30-X (online).
- Lohnt es sich, ein guter Mensch zu sein? Und andere philosophische Anfragen. Eichborn, Frankfurt am Main 2004, ISBN 3-8218-5590-8.
- Die Kunst des Zweifelns. Anleitung zum skeptischen Philosophieren. C. H. Beck, Munich 2005, ISBN 3-406-52838-4, 3rd edition 2008 (Beck’sche Reihe. vol. 1664).
- Sinnstiftung durch Geschichte? Zur Genese der spekulativ-universalistischen Geschichtsphilosophie zwischen Pierre Bayle und Immanuel Kant. Schwabe, Basel 2006, ISBN 3-7965-2214-9 (Schwabe Philosophica. vol. 8).
- Die Kunst der Seelenruhe. Anleitung zum stoischen Denken. C. H. Beck, Munich 2009, 2nd edition 2010, ISBN 978-3-406-59194-5. (Beck’sche Reihe. vol. 1940).
- Die Münzen des Byzantinischen Reiches 491–1453. Mit einem Anhang: Die Münzen des Reiches von Trapezunt. Battenberg, Regenstauf 2010, ISBN 978-3-86646-061-4.
- Geschichte und Gegenwart der Akademischen Zunft. Schwabe, Basel 2011, ISBN 978-3-7965-2789-0 (Basler Universitätsreden. vol. 109).
- Kommentar zu Nietzsches Der Fall Wagner. Götzen-Dämmerung (= Heidelberger Akademie der Wissenschaften (ed.): Historischer und kritischer Kommentar zu Friedrich Nietzsches Werken, vol. 6/1), Berlin / Boston: Walter de Gruyter 2012 (ISBN 978-3-11-028683-0).
- Lexikon der imaginären philosophischen Werke. Eichborn, Frankfurt am Main 2012, ISBN 978-3-8218-6241-5 (Die Andere Bibliothek, vol. 326).
- Kommentar zu Nietzsches Der Antichrist. Ecce homo. Dionysos-Dithyramben. Nietzsche contra Wagner (= Heidelberger Akademie der Wissenschaften (ed.): Historischer und kritischer Kommentar zu Friedrich Nietzsches Werken, vol. 6/2), Berlin / Boston: Walter de Gruyter 2013. (ISBN 978-3-11-029277-0).
- Kommentar zu Nietzsches Jenseits von Gut und Böse (= Heidelberger Akademie der Wissenschaften (Hg.): Historischer und kritischer Kommentar zu Friedrich Nietzsches Werken, vol. 5/1). De Gruyter, Berlin / Boston 2016, ISBN 978-3-11-029307-4.
- Werte. Warum man sie braucht, obwohl es sie nicht gibt. J. B. Metzler, Stuttgart 2016 (ISBN 978-3-476-02649-1).
- Nietzsche und die Folgen. J. B. Metzler, Stuttgart 2017 (ISBN 978-3-476-02654-5, eBook ISBN 978-3-476-05545-3)., 2. erweiterte Auflage, mit einem Anhang: Fake Nietzsche. J. B. Metzler, Stuttgart 2019.
- Was bleibt von Nietzsches Philosophie?. Berlin: Duncker & Humblot 2018 (= Lectiones Inaugurales, Bd. 19) ISBN 978-3-428-15429-6, eBook 978-3-428-55429-4)
- together with Matthias Politycki: Haltung finden. Weshalb wir sie brauchen und trotzdem nie haben werden. Stuttgart: J. B. Metzler, 2019. ISBN 978-3-476-04981-0.
- Eine Demokratie für das 21. Jahrhundert: Warum die Volksvertretung überholt ist und die Zukunft der direkten Demokratie gehört. Freiburg; Basle; Vienna: Herder, 2022. ISBN 978-3-451-39167-5 (eBook ISBN 978-3-451-82706-8).
- Kommentar zu Nietzsches Menschliches, Allzumenschliches I (= Heidelberger Akademie der Wissenschaften (Hg.): Historischer und kritischer Kommentar zu Friedrich Nietzsches Werken, vol. 2/1.1 and vol. 2/1.2), Berlin / Boston: Walter de Gruyter 2025, ISBN 978-3-11-029281-7, Ebook: ISBN 978-3-11-029295-4, see

=== Articles and Books in English ===
- On the Genealogy of the Genealogical Method: Overbeck, Nietzsche, and the Search for Origins, in: Ingo Gildenhard / Martin Ruehl (ed.), Out of Arcadia. Classics and Politics in Germany in the Age of Burckhardt, Nietzsche and Wilamowitz = Bulletin of the Institute of Classical Studies, Supplement 79, London 2003, pp. 87–103.
- Some Reflections on the Metaphysics of Decline and Fall, in: Jan Hecker-Stampehl / Aino Bannwart / Dörte Brekenfeld / Ulrike Plath (Hrsg.), Perceptions of Loss, Decline and Doom in the Baltic Sea Region. Untergangsvorstellungen im Ostseeraum = The Baltic Sea Region. Northern Dimensions – European Perspectives, vol. 1, Berlin 2004, pp. 27–31.
- Nihilism and Skepticism in Nietzsche, in: Keith Ansell Pearson (ed.), A Companion to Nietzsche, Oxford 2006, pp. 250–269
- Iselin, Isaak / Jerusalem, Johann Friedrich Wilhelm / Spalding, Johann Joachim / Stapfer, Philipp Albert, in: Heiner F. Klemme / Manfred Kuehn (ed.), The Dictionary of Eighteenth-Century German Philosophers, vol. 2, London / New York 2010, pp. 575–579, 598–599, 1100–1104 and 1115–1116.
- The Nietzsche Commentary of the Heidelberg Academy of Sciences and Humanities. Translated by Lisa Marie Anderson, in: Journal of Nietzsche Studies 42 (2011), pp. 100–104.
- Nietzsche's Readings on Spinoza. A Contextualist Study, Particularly on the Reception of Kuno Fischer, in: Journal of Nietzsche Studies 43/2 (2012), pp. 156–184.
- Afterword, in: The Complete Works of Friedrich Nietzsche, vol. 9: The Case of Wagner / Twilight of the Idols / The Antichrist / Ecce Homo / Dionysos Dithyrambs / Nietzsche Contra Wagner. With an Afterword by Andreas Urs Sommer. Translated by Adrian Del Caro, Carol Diethe, Duncan Large, George H. Leiner, Paul S. Loeb, Alan D. Schrift, David F. Tinsley, and Mirko Wittwar, Stanford, CA: Stanford University Press 2021, pp. 661–715.
- Values. Why We Need Them Although They Don’t Exist. Translated by Paul Richards. XII + 159 pages. Cham: Palgrave Macmillan, 2024 (ISBN 978-3-031-42158-7, Ebook 978-3-031-42159-4, https://doi.org/10.1007/978-3-031-42159-4)

== Awards ==
- 1992 3rd Eligius-Prize of the German Numismatic Society
- 1994 De-Wette-Prize of the Theological Seminary of Basel University
- 2003 La lunette d’or of the Swiss Academy for Humanities and Social Sciences
- 2012 Friedrich Nietzsche Prize
