= Friedrich Nietzsche bibliography =

This is a list of writings and other compositions by German philosopher Friedrich Nietzsche.

== Works by Nietzsche ==
=== Writings ===
- Aus meinem Leben, 1858 (From My Life)
- Über Musik, 1858 (On Music)
- Napoleon III als Praesident, 1862 (Napoleon III as President)
- Fatum und Geschichte, 1862 (Fate and History)
- Willensfreiheit und Fatum, 1862 (Freedom of Will and Fate)
- Kann der Neidische je wahrhaft glücklich sein?, 1863 (Can the Envious Ever Be Truly Happy?)
- Über Stimmungen, 1864 (On Moods)
- Mein Leben, 1864 (My Life)
- Homer und die klassische Philologie, 1868 (Homer and the Classical Philology)
- Über die Zukunft unserer Bildungsanstalten, 1872 (On the Future of our Educational Institutions)
- Fünf Vorreden zu fünf ungeschriebenen Büchern, 1872 (Five Prefaces on Five Unwritten Books) comprising:

1. Über das Pathos der Wahrheit (On the Pathos of Truth)
2. Gedanken über die Zukunft unserer Bildungsanstalten (Thoughts on the Future of Our Educational Institutions)
3. Der griechische Staat (The Greek State)
4. Das Verhältnis der Schopenhauerischen Philosophie zu einer deutschen Cultur (The Relation between a Schopenhauerian Philosophy and a German Culture)
5. Homers Wettkampf (Homer's Contest)

- Die Geburt der Tragödie, 1872 (The Birth of Tragedy)
- Über Wahrheit und Lüge im außermoralischen Sinn, 1873 (On Truth and Lies in a Nonmoral Sense)
- Die Philosophie im tragischen Zeitalter der Griechen, 1873 (Philosophy in the Tragic Age of the Greeks)
- Unzeitgemässe Betrachtungen (Untimely Meditations) comprising:

1. David Strauss: der Bekenner und der Schriftsteller, 1873 (David Strauss: the Confessor and the Writer)
2. Vom Nutzen und Nachtheil der Historie für das Leben, 1874 (On the Use and Abuse of History for Life)
3. Schopenhauer als Erzieher, 1874 (Schopenhauer as Educator)
4. Richard Wagner in Bayreuth, 1876

- Menschliches, Allzumenschliches, 1878 (Human, All-Too-Human)
- Vermischte Meinungen und Sprüche, 1879 (Mixed Opinions and Maxims; usually treated as the second part of Menschliches, Allzumenschliches)
- Der Wanderer und sein Schatten, 1880 (The Wanderer and His Shadow; usually treated as the third part of Menschliches, Allzumenschliches)
- Morgenröte, 1881 (The Dawn)
- Die fröhliche Wissenschaft, 1882, 1887 (The Gay Science)
- Also sprach Zarathustra, 1883-5 (Thus Spoke Zarathustra)
- Jenseits von Gut und Böse, 1886 (Beyond Good and Evil)
- Zur Genealogie der Moral, 1887 (On the Genealogy of Morality)
- Der Fall Wagner, 1888 (The Case of Wagner)
- Götzen-Dämmerung, 1888 (Twilight of the Idols)
- Der Antichrist, 1888 (The Antichrist)
- Ecce Homo, 1888
- Nietzsche contra Wagner, 1888
- Der Wille zur Macht, first published 1901 (The Will to Power, a posthumous and selective collection of notes arranged by his sister, which are not necessarily representative of Nietzsche)

=== Major English translations ===
==== The Greek Music Drama, 1870 ====
- The Greek Music Drama, trans. Paul Bishop, intro by Jill Marsden. Contra Mundum Press, 2013, ISBN 978-0-9836972-7-5

==== The Birth of Tragedy, 1872 ====
- in: 'Basic Writings of Nietzsche', trans. Walter Kaufmann, Modern Library, 2000, ISBN 0-679-78339-3
- in: 'The Birth of Tragedy and Other Writings', trans. Ronald Speirs, Cambridge University Press, 1999, ISBN 0-521-63987-5 (also contains: 'The Dionysiac World View' and 'On Truth and Lying in a Non-Moral Sense')
- in: 'The Birth of Tragedy and the Case of Wagner', trans. Walter Kaufmann, Vintage, 1967, ISBN 0-394-70369-3
- in: 'The Birth of Tragedy & the Genealogy of Morals', trans. Francis Golffing, Anchor Books, 1956, ISBN 0-385-09210-5
- trans. Shaun Whiteside, Penguin Classics, 1994, ISBN 0-14-043339-2

==== The Untimely Meditations, 1873–6 ====
- as: Thoughts Out of Season, Part I ed. Oscar Levy trans. Anthony M. Ludovici. T. N. Foulis, 1909. (This volume contains David Strauss: the Confessor and the Writer and Richard Wagner in Bayreuth).
- trans. R. J. Hollingdale, Cambridge University Press, 1997, ISBN 0-521-58584-8
- as: Unfashionable Observations, trans. Richard T. Gray, Stanford University Press, 1998, ISBN 0-8047-3403-8

==== Human, All Too Human, 1878 ====
- trans. R. J. Hollingdale, Cambridge University Press, 1996, ISBN 0-521-56704-1 (also contains: 'Mixed Opinions and Maxims', 1879 and 'The Wanderer and His Shadow', 1880)
- trans. Marion Faber and Stephen Lehmann. Introduction and notes by Marion Faber, University of Nebraska Press 1984, Penguin Classics 1994. ISBN 978-0-14-044617-3
- as 'Human, All Too Human I', trans. Gary Handwerk, Stanford University Press, 2000, ISBN 0-8047-4171-9
- as 'Human, All Too Human II and Unpublished Fragments from the Period of Human, All Too Human (Spring I878- Fall I879)', trans. Gary Handwerk, Stanford University Press, 2012, ISBN 0-8047-8393-4 (also contains: 'Mixed Opinions and Maxims', 1879 and 'The Wanderer and His Shadow', 1880)

==== The Dawn, 1881 ====
- as: 'Daybreak', trans. R. J. Hollingdale, Cambridge University Press, 1997, ISBN 0-521-59963-6
- as: 'Dawn', trans. Brittain Smith, Stanford University Press, 2011, ISBN 0-8047-8005-6

==== The Gay Science, 1882, 1887 ====
- trans. Walter Kaufmann, Vintage, 1974, ISBN 0-394-71985-9
- ed. Bernard Williams, trans. Josefine Nauckhoff and Adrian Del Caro, Cambridge University Press, 2001, ISBN 0-521-63645-0
- as: 'The Joyous Science', trans. R. Kevin Hill, Penguin Random House, 2018, ISBN 978-0-14-119539-1
- as 'The Joyful Science / Idylls from Messina / Unpublished Fragments from the Period of The Joyful Science (Spring 1881-Summer 1882)', trans. Adrian Del Caro, Stanford University Press, 2023, ISBN 978-1-5036-3232-5

==== Thus Spoke Zarathustra, 1883–5 ====
- trans. R. J. Hollingdale, Penguin, 1961, ISBN 0-14-044118-2
- in: 'The Portable Nietzsche', trans. Walter Kaufmann, Penguin, 1977, ISBN 0-14-015062-5
- trans. Adrián del Caro, Cambridge University Press, 2006, ISBN 0-521-60261-0
- trans. Graham Parkes, Oxford University Press, 2005, ISBN 0-19-280583-5

==== Beyond Good and Evil, 1886 ====
- trans. R. J. Hollingdale, Penguin Classics, 1973, ISBN 0-14-044267-7
- in: 'Basic Writings of Nietzsche', trans. Walter Kaufmann, Modern Library, 2000, ISBN 0-679-78339-3
- trans. Judith Norman, Cambridge University Press, 2001, ISBN 0-521-77913-8
- in: 'Beyond Good and Evil / On the Genealogy of Morality', trans. Adrian Del Caro, Stanford University Press, 2014, ISBN 978-0-8047-8898-4

==== On the Genealogy of Morals, 1887 ====
- in: 'The Birth of Tragedy & the Genealogy of Morals', trans. Francis Golffing, Anchor Books, 1956, ISBN 0-385-09210-5
- in: 'Basic Writings of Nietzsche', trans. Walter Kaufmann, Modern Library, 2000, ISBN 0-679-78339-3
- in: 'On the Genealogy of Morals and Ecce Homo', trans. Walter Kaufmann and R. J. Hollingdale, Vintage, 1989, ISBN 0-679-72462-1
- in: 'On the Genealogy of Morality and Other Writings', trans. Carol Diethe, Cambridge University Press, 1994, ISBN 0-521-40610-2 (also contains: 'The Greek State', 1872 and 'Homer on Competition', 1872)
- as 'On the Genealogy of Morals', trans. Douglas Smith, Oxford University Press, 1996, ISBN 0-19-283617-X (paperback)
- as 'On the Genealogy of Morality', trans. Maudemarie Clark and Alan J. Swensen, Hackett Publishing Company, 1998, ISBN 0-87220-283-6
- in: 'Beyond Good and Evil / On the Genealogy of Morality', trans. Adrian Del Caro, Stanford University Press, 2014, ISBN 978-0-8047-8898-4

==== The Case of Wagner, 1888 ====
- in: 'Basic Writings of Nietzsche', trans. Walter Kaufmann, Modern Library, 2000, ISBN 0-679-78339-3
- in: 'The Birth of Tragedy and the Case of Wagner', trans. Walter Kaufmann, Vintage, 1967, ISBN 0-394-70369-3
- in: 'The Anti-Christ, Ecce Homo, Twilight of the Idols and Other Writings', trans. Judith Norman, Cambridge University Press, 2005, ISBN 0-521-01688-6 (also contains: 'The Case of Wagner', 1888 and 'Nietzsche contra Wagner', 1888)
- in: The Case of Wagner / Twilight of the Idols / The Antichrist / Ecce Homo / Dionysus Dithyrambs / Nietzsche Contra Wagner, The Complete Works of Friedrich Nietzsche, Volume 9, trans. Adrian Del Caro and others. Stanford University Press, 2021. Hardcover ISBN 978-0-8047-2882-9; Paperback ISBN 978-1-5036-1254-9

==== Twilight of the Idols, 1888 ====
- in: 'The Portable Nietzsche', trans. Walter Kaufmann, Penguin, 1977, ISBN 0-14-015062-5
- trans. Richard Polt, Hackett Publishing Company, 1997, ISBN 0-87220-354-9
- in: 'Twilight of the Idols and the Anti-Christ', trans. R. J. Hollingdale, Penguin Classics, 1990, ISBN 0-14-044514-5
- in: 'The Anti-Christ, Ecce Homo, Twilight of the Idols and Other Writings', trans. Judith Norman, Cambridge University Press, 2005, ISBN 0-521-01688-6 (also contains: 'The Case of Wagner', 1888 and 'Nietzsche contra Wagner', 1888)
- trans. Duncan Large, Oxford World's Classics, Oxford University Press, 1998, ISBN 0-19-283138-0
- Twilight of the Idols or How to Philosophize with a Hammer. Translation by Daniel Fidel Ferrer (2013). Free online. Also, Includes letters and notes about Twilight of the Idols by Nietzsche.
- in: The Case of Wagner / Twilight of the Idols / The Antichrist / Ecce Homo / Dionysus Dithyrambs / Nietzsche Contra Wagner, The Complete Works of Friedrich Nietzsche, Volume 9, trans. Adrian Del Caro and others. Stanford University Press, 2021. Hardcover ISBN 978-0-8047-2882-9; Paperback ISBN 978-1-5036-1254-9

==== The Antichrist, 1888 ====
- in: 'Twilight of the Idols and the Anti-Christ', trans. R. J. Hollingdale, Penguin Classics, 1990, ISBN 0-14-044514-5
- in: 'The Portable Nietzsche', trans. Walter Kaufmann, Penguin, 1977, ISBN 0-14-015062-5
- in: 'The Anti-Christ, Ecce Homo, Twilight of the Idols and Other Writings', trans. Judith Norman, Cambridge University Press, 2005, ISBN 0-521-01688-6 (also contains: 'The Case of Wagner', 1888 and 'Nietzsche contra Wagner', 1888)
- in: The Case of Wagner / Twilight of the Idols / The Antichrist / Ecce Homo / Dionysus Dithyrambs / Nietzsche Contra Wagner, The Complete Works of Friedrich Nietzsche, Volume 9, trans. Adrian Del Caro and others. Stanford University Press, 2021. Hardcover ISBN 978-0-8047-2882-9; Paperback ISBN 978-1-5036-1254-9
- in: 'The Antichrist + Fragments from a Shattering Mind: Exterminating Texts and Terminal Ecstasies', trans. Domino Falls, Solar Books, 2007, ISBN 0-9714578-5-9
- as 'The Anti-Christ', trans. H. L. Mencken, See Sharp Press, 1999, ISBN 1-884365-20-5
- trans. Anthony M. Ludovici, Prometheus Books, 2000, ISBN 1-57392-832-1

==== Ecce Homo, 1888 ====
- trans. R. J. Hollingdale, Penguin Books, 1993, ISBN 0-14-044515-3
- in: 'Basic Writings of Nietzsche', trans. Walter Kaufmann, Modern Library, 2000, ISBN 0-679-78339-3
- in: 'The Anti-Christ, Ecce Homo, Twilight of the Idols and Other Writings', trans. Judith Norman, Cambridge University Press, 2005, ISBN 0-521-01688-6 (also contains: 'The Case of Wagner', 1888 and 'Nietzsche contra Wagner', 1888)
- in: The Case of Wagner / Twilight of the Idols / The Antichrist / Ecce Homo / Dionysus Dithyrambs / Nietzsche Contra Wagner, The Complete Works of Friedrich Nietzsche, Volume 9, trans. Adrian Del Caro and others. Stanford University Press, 2021. Hardcover ISBN 978-0-8047-2882-9; Paperback ISBN 978-1-5036-1254-9
- trans. Duncan Large, Oxford World's Classics, Oxford University Press, 2007, ISBN 0-19-283228-X
- Nietzsche’s Ecce homo, Notebooks and Letters: 1888-1889 / Translation by Daniel Fidel Ferrer (2023). Free at archive.org https://archive.org/details/ferrer-ecce-homo-translation-2023-nov

==== Nietzsche contra Wagner, 1888 ====
- in: 'The Portable Nietzsche', trans. Walter Kaufmann, Penguin, 1977, ISBN 0-14-015062-5
- in: 'The Anti-Christ, Ecce Homo, Twilight of the Idols and Other Writings', trans. Judith Norman, Cambridge University Press, 2005, ISBN 0-521-01688-6 (also contains: 'The Case of Wagner', 1888 and 'Nietzsche contra Wagner', 1888)
- in: The Case of Wagner / Twilight of the Idols / The Antichrist / Ecce Homo / Dionysus Dithyrambs / Nietzsche Contra Wagner, The Complete Works of Friedrich Nietzsche, Volume 9, trans. Adrian Del Caro and others. Stanford University Press, 2021. Hardcover ISBN 978-0-8047-2882-9; Paperback ISBN 978-1-5036-1254-9

==== The Will to Power and other posthumous collections ====
- The Will to Power, ed. and trans. Walter Kaufmann, Vintage, 1968, ISBN 0-394-70437-1
- Writings from the Late Notebooks, ed. Rüdiger Bittner, Cambridge University Press, 2003, ISBN 0-521-00887-5
- Philosophy and Truth: Selections from Nietzsche's Notebooks of the Early 1870s, ed. and trans. Daniel Breazeale, Prometheus Books, 1990, ISBN 1-57392-532-2
- Philosophy in the Tragic Age of the Greeks, trans. Marianne Cowan, Regnery Publishing, 1996, ISBN 0-89526-710-1
- The Pre-Platonic Philosophers, trans. Greg Whitlock, University of Illinois Press, 2001, ISBN 0-252-02559-8
- Unmodern Observations. Yale University Press. 1990. ISBN 0-300-04311-2.
- Nietzsche’s notebook of 1881: The Eternal Return of the Same. July 2021. Translation by Daniel Fidel Ferrer. Free online.
- Nietzsche's Last Notebooks 1888-1889. June 2012. Translation by Daniel Fidel Ferrer. Free online.
- Nietzsche's Notebook of 1887-1888. June 2012. Translation by Daniel Fidel Ferrer. Free online.
- Nietzsche’s Lenzer Heide Notes on European Nihilism. July 2020. Translation and essays by Daniel Fidel Ferrer. Free online.
- Nietzsche’s seven notebooks from 1876. 2020. Translation by Daniel Fidel Ferrer. Free online.
- Nietzsche’s Last Twenty Two Notebooks: complete [1886-1889] January 2021. Translation by Daniel Fidel Ferrer. Free online.
- Anti-Education: On the Future of Our Educational Institutions. Translated by Searls, Damion. New York Review of Books. December 2015. ISBN 978-1-59017-894-2., five lectures given in 1872.
- Unpublished Writings from the Period of Unfashionable Observations, The Complete Works of Friedrich Nietzsche. Volume 11. Translation. Richard T. Gray. (Stanford, California: Stanford University Press, 1999). Hardcover ISBN 978-0-8047-2884-3. Paperback ISBN 978-0-8047-3648-0
- Unpublished Writings from the Period of Human, All Too Human I (Winter 1874/75–Winter 1877/78). The Complete Works of Friedrich Nietzsche. Volume 12. Translation. Gary Handwork. (Stanford, California: Stanford University Press, 2021). Hardcover ISBN 978-0-8047-2885-0. Paperback ISBN 978-1-5036-1484-0
- Unpublished Writings from the Period of Dawn (Winter 1879/80–Spring 1881). The Complete Works of Friedrich Nietzsche. Volume 13. Translation. J. M. Baker, Jr. and Christiane Hertel (Stanford, California: Stanford University Press, 1999). Hardcover ISBN 978-0-8047-2886-7. Paperback ISBN 978-1-5036-3698-9
- Unpublished Fragments from the Period of Thus Spoke Zarathustra (Summer 1882–Winter 1883/84). The Complete Works of Friedrich Nietzsche, Volume 14. Translation: Paul S. Loeb and David F. Tinsley (Stanford, California: Stanford University Press, 2019). Hardcover ISBN 978-0-8047-2887-4. Paperback ISBN 978-1-5036-0752-1
- Unpublished Fragments from the Period of Thus Spoke Zarathustra (Spring 1884–Winter 1884/85). The Complete Works of Friedrich Nietzsche, Volume 15. Translation: Paul S. Loeb and David F. Tinsley (Stanford, California: Stanford University Press, 2022). Hardcover ISBN 978-0-8047-2888-1. Paperback ISBN 978-1-5036-2970-7
- Unpublished Fragments (Spring 1885-Spring 1886). The Complete Works of Friedrich Nietzsche, Volume 16. Translation: Adrian Del Caro (Stanford, California: Stanford University Press, 2019). Hardcover ISBN 978-0-8047-2889-8. Paperback ISBN 978-1-5036-0872-6
- Unpublished Fragments (Summer 1886-Fall 1887).The Complete Works of Friedrich Nietzsche, Volume 17. Translation: George H. Leiner (Stanford, California: Stanford University Press, 2025). Hardcover ISBN 978-0-8047-2890-4. Paperback ISBN 978-1-5036-4067-2
- Writings from the Early Notebooks. Cambridge University Press, 2009.
- Nietzsche, Friedrich; Wagner, Richard (1921). Foerster-Nietzsche, Elizabeth (ed.). The Nietzsche-Wagner Correspondence. Translated by Kerr, Caroline V. Introduction by H.L. Mencken. New York: Boni & Liveright. ASIN B000HFOAGI.

=== Philology ===
- Analecta Laertiana (1870)
- Beitrage zur Quellenkunde und Kritik des Laertius Diogenes (1870)
- De Fontibus Diogenis Laertii ("On the Sources of Diogenes Laertius"; Part I: 1868, Part II: 1869)
- Über die alten hexametrischen Nomen
- Über die Apophthegmata und ihre Sammler
- Über die literarhistorischen Quellen des Suidas
- Über die Quellen der Lexikographen

=== Poetry ===
- Idyllen aus Messina written 1882 (Idylls from Messina)
- Dionysos-Dithyramben, written 1888, published 1892 (Dionysian-Dithyrambs)
- in: The Case of Wagner / Twilight of the Idols / The Antichrist / Ecce Homo / Dionysus Dithyrambs / Nietzsche Contra Wagner, The Complete Works of Friedrich Nietzsche, Volume 9, trans. Adrian Del Caro and others. Stanford University Press, 2021. Hardcover ISBN 978-0-8047-2882-9; Paperback ISBN 978-1-5036-1254-9
- The Peacock and the Buffalo: The Poetry of Nietzsche, Published July 8, 2010
- Dionysian Dithyrambs
- Nietzsche’s Last Twenty Two Notebooks: complete [1886-1889] January 2021. Translation by Daniel Fidel Ferrer. Free online. See notebook number 20, there are 168 notes and are almost all poems or poem fragments. 20 [1-168] summer 1888 (Pages: 897-944). Note the German title: 20 = W II 10a. Sommer 1888. Octave booklet. Binding: black cover. Red color cut on all sides. 212 pages. Dating from December 1888 to early January 1889. Written by Nietzsche about halfway; partly from front to back, partly from back to front.

=== Music ===
This is not a complete list. A title not dated was composed during the same year as the title preceding it. Further information for many of the works listed below may be found at this site annotated within the time of their composition and this site (both depict Nietzsche's musical thought and development). Most pieces available for listening are excerpts.

- Allegretto, for piano, before 1858, listen
- Hoch tut euch auf, chorus, December 1858
- Einleitung (trans: Introduction), piano duet
- Phantasie, piano duet, December 1859
- Miserere, chorus for 5 voices, summer 1860
- Einleitung (or: Entwürfe zu einem Weihnachtsoratorium), oratorio on piano, December 1861
- Hüter, ist die Nacht bald hin?, chorus (in fragments)
- Presto, piano duet
- Overture for Strings (?)
- Aus der Tiefe rufe ich (?)
- String Quartet Piece (?)
- Schmerz ist der Grundton der Natur (?)
- Einleitung, orchestral overture for piano
- Mein Platz vor der Tur, NWV 1, solo voice and piano, autumn 1861, listen
- Heldenklage, piano, 1862
- Klavierstuck, piano
- Ungarischer Marsch, piano
- Zigeunertanz, piano
- Edes titok (or: Still und ergeben), piano
- Aus der Jugendzeit, NWV 8, solo voice and piano, summer 1862, listen
- So lach doch mal, piano, August 1862
- Da geht ein Bach, NWV 10b, listen
- Im Mondschein auf der Puszta, piano, September 1862
- Ermanarich, piano, September 1862
- Mazurka, piano, November 1862
- Aus der Czarda, piano, November 1862, listen
- Das zerbrochene Ringlein, NWV 14, May 1863, listen
- Albumblatt, piano, August 1863
- Wie sich Rebenranken schwingen, NWV 16, summer 1863, voice and piano, listen
- Nachlang einer Sylvestenacht, duet for violin and piano, January 2, 1864, listen
- Beschwörung, NWV 20, listen
- Nachspiel, NWV 21, listen
- Ständchen, NWV 22
- Unendlich, NWV 23, listen
- Verwelkt, NWV 24, listen
- Ungewitter, NWV 25, 1864, listen
- Gern und gerner, NWV 26, listen
- Das Kind an die erloschene Kerze, NWV 27, listen
- Es winkt und neigt sich, NWV 28, listen
- Die junge Fischerin, NWV 29, voice and piano, June 1865, listen
- O weint um sie, choir and piano, December 1865
- Herbstlich sonnige Tage, piano and 4 voices, April 1867
- Adel Ich muss nun gehen, 4 voices, August 1870
- Das "Fragment an sich", piano, October 1871
- Kirchengeschichtliches Responsorium, chorus and piano, November 1871
- Manfred-Meditation, 1872, final ver. 1877, listen
- Monodie à deux (or: Lob der Barmherzigkeit), piano, February 1873
- Hymnus an die Freundschaft (trans: Hymn to Friendship; also: Festzug der Freunde zum Tempel der Freundschaft, trans: Festival of Friends at the Temple of Friendship), piano, December 29, 1874, listen
- Gebet an das Leben (trans: Prayer to Life), NWV 41, solo voice and piano, 1882, text by Lou Andreas-Salome, listen
- Hymnus an das Leben (trans: Hymn to Life), chorus and orchestra, summer 1887

== See also ==
- List of works about Friedrich Nietzsche
