= List of works about Friedrich Nietzsche =

This is a bibliography of works about 19th-century philosopher Friedrich Nietzsche.

There have been many bibliographies documenting works about Nietzsche, the most comprehensive is considered to be the Weimarer Nietzsche-Bibliographie published between 2000 and 2002, listing over 20,000 items from 1867 to 1998, volume 1 consisting of Nietzsche's own works and translations in 42 languages while volumes 2 to 5 consist of works about Nietzsche, in the form of books, articles and more.

== Literature ==
- Abbey, Ruth, Nietzsche's Middle Period, New York: Oxford University Press, 2000, ISBN 0-19-513408-7
- Appel, Fredrick, Nietzsche Contra Democracy, New York: Cornell University Press, 1999, ISBN 0-8014-3424-6
- Arena, Leonardo Vittorio, Nietzsche e il nonsense, Milan: Franco Angeli, 1994, ISBN 88-204-8629-6
- Arena, Leonardo Vittorio, Nietzsche in China in the XXth Century, ebook, 2012
- Aschheim, Steven E., The Nietzsche Legacy in Germany 1800-1990, Berkeley: University of California Press, 1992
- Bataille, Georges, Nietzsche and Fascists, in the January 1937 issue of Acéphale (available on-line)
- Bataille, Georges, On Nietzsche. St. Paul: Paragon House, 1993, 978-1557786449
- Babich, Babette E., Nietzsche's Philosophy of Science. Albany: State University of New York Press, 1994, ISBN 0-7914-1866-9
- Benson, Bruce E., Pious Nietzsche: Decadence and Dionysian Faith. Indiana: Indiana University Press, 2007, ISBN 0-253-21874-8
- Bishop, Paul and Stephenson, R. H., Friedrich Nietzsche and Weimar Classicism, Rochester, New York: Camden House, 2004, ISBN 9781571136473
- Blondel, Eric, Nietzsche: The Body and Culture, Stanford: Stanford University Press, 1991, ISBN 0-485-11391-0
- Botwinick, Aryeh, Skepticism, Belief, and the Modern: Maimonides to Nietzsche, Ithaca: Cornell University Press, 1997, ISBN 0-8014-3208-1
- Cauchi, Francesca, "Zarathustra contra Zarathustra: The Tragic Buffoon," Aldershot: Ashgate, 1998, ISBN 1-840-14351-7
- Chamberlain, Lesley, Nietzsche in Turin: An Intimate Biography. New York: Picador, 1998, ISBN 0-312-19938-4
- Clark, Maudemarie, Nietzsche on Truth and Philosophy, New York: Cambridge University Press, 1990, ISBN 0-521-34850-1
- Conway, Daniel (Ed.), Nietzsche and the Political (Routledge, 1997)
- Conway, Daniel W., Nietzsche's Dangerous Game: Philosophy in the Twilight of the Idols, Cambridge: Cambridge University Press, 1997, ISBN 0-521-89287-2
- Danto, Arthur C., Nietzsche as Philosopher, New York: Columbia University Press, 1980, ISBN 0-231-13519-X
- Deleuze, Gilles, Nietzsche and Philosophy New York: Columbia University Press, 1983, ISBN 0-8264-9075-1
- Derrida, Jacques, Spurs, Nietzsche's Styles, Chicago: The University of Chicago Press, 1979, ISBN 0-226-14333-3
- Derrida, Jacques, The Ear of the Other: Otobiography, Transference, Translation, Lincoln & London: University of Nebraska Press, 1985, ISBN 0-8032-6575-1
- Eberlein, Hermann-Peter, Flamme bin ich sicherlich! Friedrich Nietzsche, Franz Overbeck und ihre Freunde, Köln: Schmidt von Schwind-Verlag, 1999, ISBN 3-932050-15-0
- Eberwein, Dieter, Nietzsche's Writing Ball - a spot on Nietzsche's typewriter period, Schauenburg/Germany, www.eberwein-typoskriptverlag.de, 2005
- Foucault, Michel, Aesthetics, Method, and Epistemology, New York: The New Press, 1998, ISBN 1-56584-329-0
- Gaultier, Jules de., From Kant to Nietzsche, New York: Philosophical Library, 1961, ISBN 0-8065-3047-2
- Gillespie, M. A., Nihilism before Nietzsche, Chicago: The University of Chicago Press, 1996, ISBN 0-226-29348-3
- Gilman, Sander L, ed., Conversations with Nietzsche: A Life in the Words of his Contemporaries. trans. David J. Parent, New York: Oxford University Press, Inc., 1987, ISBN 0-19-506778-9
- Golan, Zev, God, Man and Nietzsche, New York: iUniverse, 2007, ISBN 0-595-68214-6
- Green, Michael Steven, Nietzsche and the Transcendental Tradition, Urbana, Illinois University Press, 2002, ISBN 0-252-02735-3
- Habermas, Jürgen, "The Entry into Postmodernity: Nietzsche as a Turning Point" in The Philosophical Discourse of Modernity, Cambridge: The MIT Press, 1991, ISBN 0-262-58102-7
- Hales, Steven D. and Welshon, Rex. Nietzsche's Perspectivism, Urbana: University of Illinois Press, 2000, ISBN 0-252-02535-0
- Hatab, Lawrence J., Nietzsche's Life Sentence: Coming to Terms with Eternal Recurrence. London: Routledge, 2005, ISBN 0-415-96759-7
- Hayman, Ronald, Nietzsche, a Critical Life. New York: Oxford University Press, 1980, ISBN 0-297-77636-3
- Heidegger, Martin, Nietzsche: Volume I, The Will to Power as Art, San Francisco: Harper & Row, 1979 (note that the publication of these courses made in the 1930s is not integral)
- Heidegger, Martin, Nietzsche: Volume II, The Eternal Return of the Same, San Francisco: Harper & Row, 1984
- Heidegger, Martin, Nietzsche: Volume III, The Will to Power As Knowledge and As Metaphysics, HarperCollins, 1991, ISBN 0-06-063841-9
- Heidegger, Martin, Nietzsche: Volume IV, Nihilism, San Francisco: Harper & Row, 1982
- Heller, Erich, The Importance of Nietzsche: Ten Essays, Chicago: University of Chicago Press, 1988, ISBN 0-226-32637-3
- Higgins, Kathleen Marie, Comic Relief: Nietzsche's Gay Science. Oxford: Oxford University Press, 1999, ISBN 0-19-512691-2
- Hill, R. Kevin, Nietzsche's Critique: The Kantian Foundations of His Thought, New York: Oxford University Press, 1995, ISBN 0-19-928552-7
- Hollingdale, R. J., Nietzsche, Routledge & Kegan Paul, 1973, ISBN 0-7100-7563-4
- Hollingdale, R. J., Nietzsche: The Man and His Philosophy, Revised Edition, Cambridge University Press, 1999, ISBN 0-521-64091-1
- Hunt, Lester H, Nietzsche and the Origin of Virtue. London: Routledge, 1991, ISBN 0-415-09580-8
- Huskinson, Lucy Nietzsche and Jung: The Whole Self in the Union of Opposites Brunner-Routledge, 2004, ISBN 1-58391-833-7
- Hyde, J. Keith, Concepts of Power in Kierkegaard and Nietzsche Ashgate, 2010, ISBN 978-0-7546-6574-8
- Irigaray, Luce. Marine Lover: Of Friedrich Nietzsche, New York, Columbia University Press, 1980, ISBN 0-231-07083-7
- Jaspers, Karl, Nietzsche: An Introduction to the Understanding of his Philosophical Activity, Tucson: The University of Arizona Press, 1965, ISBN 0-8018-5779-1
- Jung, Carl G, Nietzsche's “Zarathustra”, ed. James L. Jarrett. Princeton: Princeton University Press, 1988, ISBN 0-691-09953-7
- Jünger, Friedrich Georg, Nietzsche, Frankfurt: Verlag Vittorio Klostermann, 1949
- Kaufmann, Walter, Nietzsche: Philosopher, Psychologist, Antichrist (Fourth Edition), Princeton: Princeton University Press, 1974, ISBN 0-691-01983-5
- Kierans, Kenneth (2010). "On the Unity of Nietzsche's Philosophy" (PDF). Animus. 14. ISSN 1209-0689.
- Klossowski, Pierre, Nietzsche and the Vicious Circle, The University of Chicago Press, 1997, ISBN 0-8264-7719-4
- Kofman, Sarah, Nietzsche and Metaphor, Stanford: Stanford University Press, 1993, ISBN 0-485-12098-4
- Krell, David Farrell Nietzsche: A Novel State University of New York Press, Albany, 1996, ISBN 0-7914-2999-7
- Krell, David Farrell Infectious Nietzsche Indiana University Press, 1996, ISBN 0-585-10575-8
- Lampert, Laurence, Nietzsche's Teaching: An Interpretation of Thus Spoke Zarathustra, New Haven: Yale University Press, 1986, ISBN 0-300-04430-5
- Lampert, Laurence, Nietzsche and Modern Times: A Study of Bacon, Descartes, and Nietzsche, New Haven: Yale University Press, 1993, ISBN 0-300-06510-8
- Lampert, Laurence, Leo Strauss and Nietzsche, Chicago: University of Chicago Press, 1996, ISBN 0-226-46826-7
- Lampert, Laurence, Nietzsche's Task: An Interpretation of Beyond Good and Evil, New Haven: Yale University Press, 2001
- Lavrin, Janko, Nietzsche: An Approach, London: Methuen, 1948, ISBN 1-4067-4109-4
- Lemm, Vanessa, " Nietzsche´s Animal Philosophy : Culture, Politics, and the Animality of the Human Being " New York : Fordham University Press, 2009, ISBN 978-0-8232-3028-0
- Liebert, Georges, Nietzsche and Music, translated by David Pellauer and Graham Parkes. Chicago: University of Chicago Press, 2004, ISBN 0-226-48087-9
- Leiter, Brian, Nietzsche on Morality, London: Routledge, 2002, ISBN 0-415-15285-2
- Levine, Peter, Nietzsche and the Modern Crisis of the Humanities, Albany: State University of New York Press, 1995, ISBN 0-7914-2328-X
- Lomax, J. Harvey, Paradox of Philosophical Education: Nietzsche's New Nobility and the Eternal Recurrence in Beyond Good and Evil, Lanham: Lexington Books, 2003, ISBN 0-7391-0477-2
- Löwith, Karl, From Hegel to Nietzsche: the Revolution in Nineteenth Century Thought, New York: Columbia University Press, 1991, ISBN 0-231-07499-9
- Löwith, Karl, Nietzsche's Philosophy of the Eternal Recurrence of the Same, Berkeley: University of California Press. 1997, ISBN 0-520-06519-0
- MacIntyre, Alasdair, After Virtue: A Study in Moral Theory, Notre Dame: University of Notre Dame Press, 1981, ISBN 0-7156-0933-5
- MacIntyre, Alasdair, Whose Justice? Which Rationality?, Notre Dame: University of Notre Dame Press, 1988, ISBN 0-268-01944-4
- MacIntyre, Alasdair, Three Rival Versions of Moral Enquiry: Encyclopaedia, Genealogy, and Tradition, Notre Dame: University of Notre Dame Press, 1990, ISBN 0-268-09368-7
- Magnus, Bernd, Nietzsche's Existential Imperative. Bloomington: Indiana University Press, 1978, ISBN 0-253-34062-4
- Magnus, Bernd; Stewart, Stanley; and Mileur, Jean-Pierre. Nietzsche's Case: Philosophy As/And Literature, New York: Routledge, 1993, ISBN 0-415-90095-6
- Mandel, Siegfried, Nietzsche & the Jews, New York: Prometheus Books, 1998, ISBN 1-57392-223-4
- Mencken, Henry L., The Philosophy of Friedrich Nietzsche, California: The Noontide Press, 1982 Download PDF here
- Miklowitz, Paul S. Hegel, Nietzsche, and the End of Philosophy, Albany: State University of New York Press, 1998, ISBN 0-7914-3877-5
- Montinari, Mazzino. Reading Nietzsche, trans. Greg Whitlock, University of Illinois Press, 2003, ISBN 0-252-02798-1
- Montinari, Mazzino. "The Will to Power" does not exist (Sigrid Oloff-Montinari original Italian edition Centro Montinari (Italian))
- Moore, Gregory, Nietzsche, Biology and Metaphor. Cambridge: Cambridge University Press, 2002, ISBN 0-521-81230-5
- Müller-Lauter, Wolfgang, Nietzsche: His Philosophy of Contradictions and the Contradictions of his Philosophy, Urbana: University of Illinois Press, 1999, ISBN 0-252-06758-4
- Nehamas, Alexander, Nietzsche: Life as Literature, Cambridge: Harvard University Press, 1985, ISBN 0-674-62426-2
- Oliver, Kelly, Womanizing Nietzsche: Philosophy's Relation to the “Feminine.” New York and London: Routledge, 1995, ISBN 0-415-90682-2
- Olsen, Lance, Nietzsche's Kisses, Tallahassee: Fiction Collective Two, 2006, ISBN 1573661279
- Parkes, Graham, Composing the Soul: Reaches of Nietzsche's Psychology. Chicago and London: University of Chicago Press, 1994, ISBN 0-226-64687-4
- Pletch, Carl, Young Nietzsche: Becoming a Genius. New York: Free Press, 1991, ISBN 0-02-925042-0
- Porter, James I., Nietzsche and the Philology of the Future, Stanford: Stanford University Press, 2000, ISBN 0-8047-3698-7
- Porter, James I., The Invention of Dionysus: An Essay on The Birth of Tragedy, Stanford: Stanford University Press, 2000, ISBN 0-8047-3699-5
- Ratner-Rosenhagen, Jennifer (2012). American Nietzsche: A History of an Icon and His Ideas. Chicago: University of Chicago Press. ISBN 978-0-226-70581-1.
- Reginster, Bernard, The Affirmation of Life: Nietzsche on Overcoming Nihilism, Cambridge: Harvard University Press, 2006, ISBN 0-674-02199-1
- Richardson, John, Nietzsche's System. Oxford: Oxford University Press, 1996, ISBN 0-19-515595-5
- Richardson, John, Nietzsche's New Darwinism. Oxford: Oxford University Press, 2004, ISBN 0-19-517103-9
- Rosen, Stanley, The Mask of Enlightenment: Nietzsche's Zarathustra, New York: Cambridge University Press, 1995
- Rosen, Stanley, The Question of Being: A Reversal of Heidegger, New Haven: Yale University Press, 1993, ISBN 1-58731-675-7
- Safranski, Ruediger, Nietzsche: A Philosophical Biography, translated by Shelley Frisch. New York: W.W. Norton, 2002, ISBN 0-393-05008-4
- Sallis, John, Crossings: Nietzsche and the Space of Tragedy, Chicago & London: University of Chicago Press, 1991, ISBN 0-226-73437-4
- Salomé, Lou, Nietzsche, ed. and trans. Siegfried Mandel. Redding Ridge, Connecticut: Black Swan Books, Ltd., 1988, ISBN 0-252-07035-6
- Santayana, George, Egotism in German Philosophy, New York: Haskell House Publishers Ltd., 1971
- Santaniello, Weaver, Zarathustra's Last Supper: Nietzsche's Eight Higher Men, Ashgate Publishing, Ltd., 2005, ISBN 0-7546-3196-6
- Santaniello, Weaver, "Nietzsche, God, and the Jews", Albany: SUNY Press, 2004, ISBN 0-7914-2136-8
- Schaberg, William H., The Nietzsche Canon: A Publication History and Bibliography. Chicago: The University of Chicago Press, 1996, ISBN 0-226-73575-3
- Schacht, Richard, Nietzsche, Routledge & Kegan Paul, 1985, ISBN 0-415-09071-7
- Schacht, Richard, Making Sense of Nietzsche: Reflections Timely and Untimely, Urbana: University of Illinois Press, 1995, ISBN 0-252-06412-7
- Schain, Richard, The Legend of Nietzsche's Syphilis. Westport, CT: Greenwood Press, 2001, ISBN 0-313-31940-5
- Schrift, Alan D., Nietzsche and the Question of Interpretation: Between Hermeneutics and Deconstruction, New York: Routledge, 1990, ISBN 0-415-90311-4
- Schrift, Alan D., Nietzsche's French Legacy: A Genealogy of Poststructuralism, New York: Routledge, 1995, ISBN 0-415-91146-X
- Shapiro, Gary, Nietzschean Narratives. Bloomington: Indiana University Press, 1989, ISBN 0-253-34063-2
- Simmel, Georg, Schopenhauer and Nietzsche, Urbana: University of Illinois Press, 1991, ISBN 0-252-06228-0
- Simonin, David, Le Sentiment de puissance dans la philosophie de Friedrich Nietzsche, Paris: Classiques Garnier, 488 p., 2022.
- Simonin, David, Figures de la puissance dans la philosophie de Nietzsche, Paris: Rue d'Ulm, 172 p., 2023.
- Simonin, David, Aurore de Nietzsche. La performativité de l'illusion, Berlin: De Gruyter, 524 p., 2024.
- Simonin, David, (Ed.) Nietzsche et les techniques, Paris: PUF, 2025.
- Simonin, David, (Ed. with Paolo d'Iorio & Alexandre Avril), Nietzsche et la France, Paris: CNRS, 2025.
- Sloterdijk, Peter, Thinker on Stage: Nietzsche's Materialism, Minneapolis: University of Minnesota Press, 1989, ISBN 0-8166-1765-1
- Small, Robin, Nietzsche in Context, Aldershot: Ashgate Publishing Company, 2001, ISBN 0-7546-0539-6
- Small, Robin, Nietzsche and Rée: A Star Friendship. Oxford: Oxford University Press, 2005, ISBN 0-19-920427-6
- Solomon, Robert C., Living With Nietzsche: What the Great “Immoralist” Has to Teach Us. Oxford: Oxford University Press, 2003, ISBN 0-19-516014-2
- Sorgner, Stefan Lorenz: Metaphysics without Truth - On the Importance of Consistency within Nietzsche’s Philosophy. In der Buchreihe Münchner Philosophische Beiträge, herausgegeben von N. Knoepffler, W. Vossenkuhl, S. Peetz und B. Lauth, Utz Verlag, München 1999.
- Stack, George J., Nietzsche's Anthropic Circle: Man, Science, and Myth, Rochester: University of Rochester Press, 2005, ISBN 1-58046-191-3
- Stambaugh, Joan, Nietzsche's Thought of Eternal Return, Baltimore, Johns Hopkins University Press, 1972, ISBN 0-8018-1288-7
- Stambaugh, Joan, The Problem of Time in Nietzsche, Lewisburg: Bucknell University Press, 1987, ISBN 0-8387-5113-X
- Stambaugh, Joan, The Other Nietzsche, New York: State University of New York Press, 1994, ISBN 0-7914-1699-2
- Steinbuch, Thomas, A Commentary on Nietzsche's Ecce Homo. Lanham, MD: University Press of America, 1994, ISBN 0-8191-9608-8
- Steiner, Rudolf, Friedrich Nietzsche: Fighter for Freedom, New York: Spiritual Science Library, 1985, ISBN 0-89345-033-2
- Stern, J. P. A Study of Nietzsche, Cambridge: Cambridge University Press, 1981, ISBN 0-521-28380-9
- Nietzsche and Asian Thought
- Strathern, Paul, "The Essential Nietzsche", Virgin Books Ltd., 2002, ISBN 0-7535-0603-3
- Strong, Tracy B., Friedrich Nietzsche and the Politics of Transfiguration (Expanded Edition), Berkeley: University of California Press, 1988, ISBN 0-252-06856-4
- Tanner, Michael, "Nietzsche", Oxford University Press, 1994, ISBN 0-19-287680-5
- Tejera, V., Nietzsche and Greek Thought, Dordrecht: Martinus Nijhoff Publishers, 1987, ISBN 90-247-3475-4
- Vattimo, Gianni, Dialogue with Nietzsche, New York: Columbia University Press, 2006, ISBN 0-231-13240-9
- Waite, Geoff, Nietzsche's Corps/E: Aesthetics, Politics, Prophecy, or, The Spectacular Technoculture of Everyday Life, Durham: Duke University Press, 1998, ISBN 0-8223-1719-2
- Wallis, Glenn, Nietzsche NOW!The Great Immoralist on the Vital Issues of Our Time, New York, Warbler Press, 2024, ISBN 1962572412
- White, Alan, Within Nietzsche's Labyrinth. New York and London: Routledge, 1990, ISBN 0-415-90328-9
- Wilcox, John T., Truth and Value in Nietzsche, Ann Arbor: University of Michigan Press, 1974, ISBN 0-472-97400-9
- Young, Julian, Nietzsche's Philosophy of Art, Cambridge: Cambridge University Press, 1992, ISBN 0-521-45575-8
- Young, Julian, Nietzsche's Philosophy of Religion. Cambridge: Cambridge University Press, 2006, ISBN 0-521-85422-9
- Zuckert, Catherine H., Postmodern Platos: Nietzsche, Heidegger, Gadamer, Strauss, Derrida, Chicago: The University of Chicago Press, 1996, ISBN 0-226-99330-2
- Zupančič, Alenka, The Shortest Shadow. Nietzsche's Philosophy of the Two, Cambridge, Mass.: MIT Press, 2003, ISBN 0-262-74026-5

=== Collections ===
- 'I Am Not A Man, I Am Dynamite!': Friedrich Nietzsche and the Anarchist Tradition, ed. John Moore, New York: Autonomedia, 2004, ISBN 1-57027-121-6
- Looking after Nietzsche, ed. Laurence A. Rickels, Albany, State University of New York Press, 1990
- Nietzsche and Antiquity: His Reaction and Response to the Classical Tradition, ed. Paul Bishop, Camden House, 2004, ISBN 1-57113-282-1
- Modern Critical Views: Friedrich Nietzsche, ed. Bloom, Harold, New York, New Haven, Philadelphia: Chelsea House Publishers, 1987
- Nietzsche, eds. Richardson, John, and Leiter, Brian, Oxford: Oxford University Press, 2001
- Nietzsche: A Collection of Critical Essays, ed. Robert C. Solomon, Garden City: Anchor Books, 1973
- Nietzsche: A Critical Reader, ed. Peter R. Sedgwick, Oxford: Blackwell Publishers Limited, 1995
- Nietzsche and the Rhetoric of Nihilism eds. Tom Darby, Bela Egyed, and Ben Jones, Ottawa: Carleton University Press, 1989
- Nietzsche as Postmodern: Essays Pro and Contra, ed. Clayton Koelb, Albany, State University of New York Press, 1990
- Nietzsche, Genealogy, Morality: Essays on Nietzsche's Genealogy of Morals, ed. Richard Schacht, Berkeley, University of California Press, 1994
- Nietzsche, Godfather of Fascism? On the Uses and Abuses of Philosophy, eds. Jacob Golomb and Robert S. Wistrich, Princeton: Princeton University Press, 2002
- Nietzsche: Imagery & Thought ed. Malcolm Pasley, London: Methuen, 1978
- Nietzsche's New Seas: Explorations in Philosophy, Aesthetics and Politics, eds. Michael Allen Gillespie and Tracy B. Strong, Chicago: University of Chicago Press, 1991
- Nietzsche's “On the Genealogy of Morals”: Critical Essays, ed. Acampora, Christa Davis, Lanham, MD: Rowman & Littlefield, 2006
- Reading Nietzsche, eds. Robert C. Solomon and Kathleen M. Higgins, New York: Oxford University Press, 1990
- Studies in Nietzsche and the Judaeo-Christian Tradition, eds. James C. O'Flaherty, Timothy F. Sellner, and Robert M. Helm, Chapel Hill: University of North Carolina Press, 1985
- Studies in Nietzsche and the Classical Tradition, eds. James C. O'Flaherty, Timothy F. Sellner, and Robert M. Helm, Chapel Hill: University of North Carolina Press, 1979
- The Cambridge Companion to Nietzsche, eds. Magnus, Bernd, and Kathleen M. Higgins, Cambridge: Cambridge University Press, 1996
- The New Nietzsche, ed. David B. Allison, New York: Delta, 1977
- Why We are not Nietzscheans, eds. Luc Ferry and Alain Renault, Chicago: University of Chicago Press, 1991
- Why Nietzsche Still? Reflections on Drama, Culture, and Politics, ed. Alan D. Schrift, Berkeley: University of California Press, 2000
- Willing and Nothingness: Schopenhauer as Nietzsche's Educator, ed. Janaway, Christopher, Oxford: Oxford University Press, 1998

== Journals about Nietzsche ==
- The Agonist: A Nietzsche Circle Journal
- The Journal of Nietzsche Studies
- Nietzscheforschung
- Nietzsche-Studien: Internationales Jahrbuch für die Nietzsche-Forschung
- New Nietzsche Studies

== Film and television ==
- Beyond Good and Evil (1977)
- Human, All Too Human (1999)
- Days of Nietzsche in Turin (2001)
- When Nietzsche Wept
  - Novel (1992)
  - Film (2007)
- The Turin Horse (2011)

== See also ==
- Friedrich Nietzsche bibliography
