= Nietzsche and Asian Thought =

1991 anthology edited by Graham Parkes

- Cover of the first edition
- Editor: Graham Parkes
- Language: English
- Subject: Friedrich Nietzsche, Asian thought
- Publisher: The University of Chicago Press
- Publication date: 1991
- Publication place: United States

Nietzsche and Asian Thought is an anthology of essays by a variety of contributors on the relationship of the thought of German philosopher Friedrich Nietzsche to Asian philosophy; specifically, Indian, Chinese and Japanese philosophy. The book was edited by the philosopher Graham Parkes and was released in 1991 by the University of Chicago Press. The work was written for a Western audience of Nietzsche scholars and comparative philosophers, but features contributions from non-Western thinkers.

The work is split into four sections—Others, India, China and Japan—and each section contains between three and four essays, for a total of 14 articles by 13 different authors. The work was well received by academic reviewers upon its release, and praised as a "must-read" for both Nietzsche scholars and comparative philosophers. In 2004, a special edition of The Journal of Nietzsche Studies was published, aiming to build upon the scholarship in Nietzsche and Asian Thought.

== Concept and contributors ==
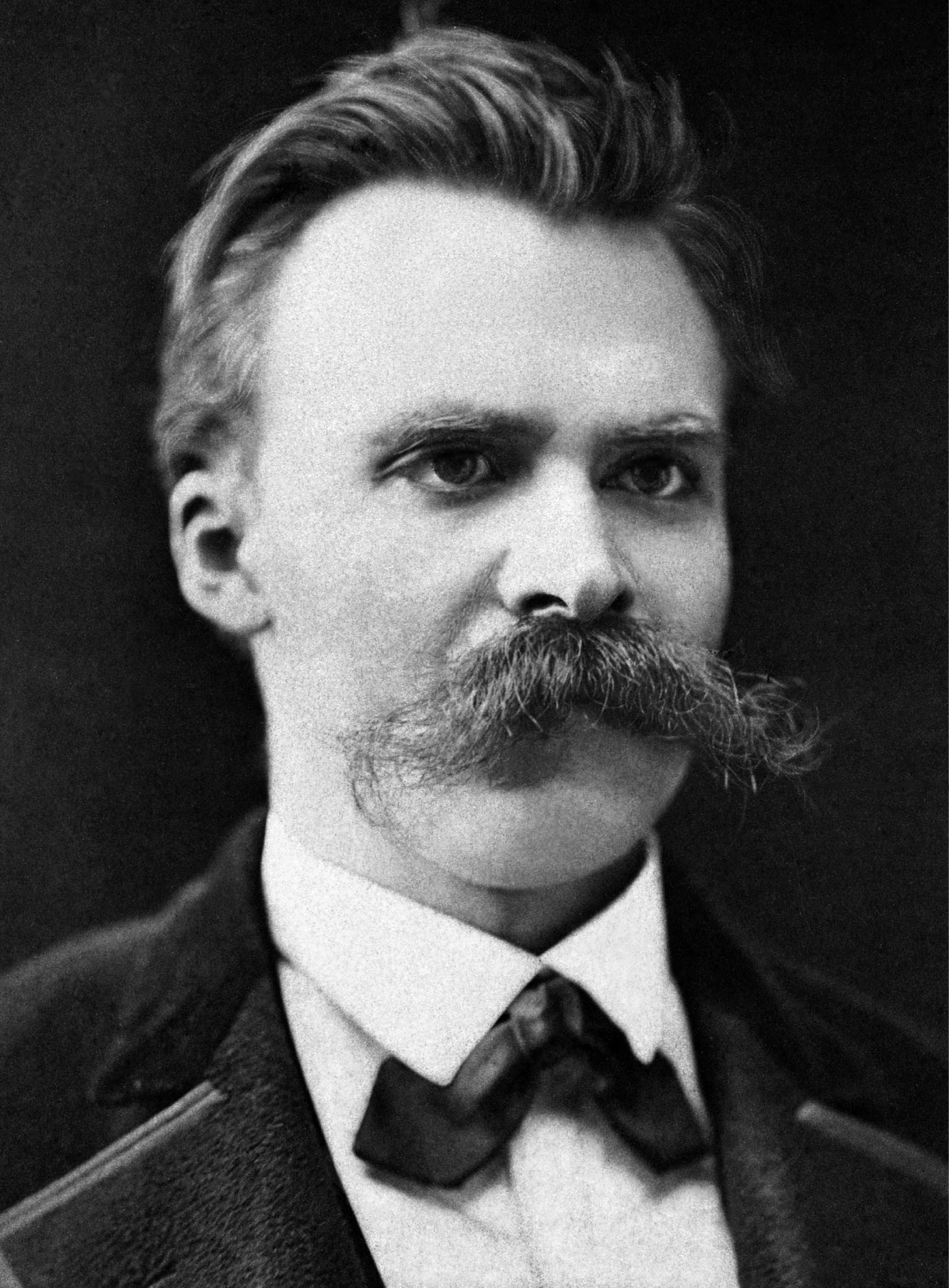
Nietzsche, aged around 30, in the 1870s

The essays contained in Nietzsche and Asian Thought were collected to illustrate both the influence that Asian (specifically, Indian) philosophy had on Nietzsche, and the influence that Nietzsche's thought subsequently had on Asian schools (in particular, Chinese and Japanese philosophy). Despite the fact that published scholarship on Nietzsche had increased in the years preceding the appearance of the book, very little had been written on the relationship between Nietzsche's philosophy and Asian philosophy. Further, only a very small portion of works written in Western languages on Nietzsche had addressed the response his works had provoked in Asia, especially Japan, after his death. Nietzsche and Asian Thought was "intended as an initial contribution towards redressing [the] imbalance", and all but two of the essays in the anthology were written specifically for it.

Parkes wrote that the genre of the anthology is an appropriate one in which to write about Nietzsche, claiming that he is "above all a writer in many voices, and one problem with books written about his work is that they have been mainly 'monological,' with the author speaking in only one voice." He argues that justice is more likely to be done to Nietzsche's work when a multiplicity of perspectives is possible, and that Nietzsche and Asian Thought takes this idea further, with the inclusion of thinkers from East Asia as well as Europe. However, the work does not seek to recast Nietzsche as some kind of multicultural thinker, but instead serves to "complicate" our understanding of Nietzsche. One "significant absence" from the work is the work of Nishitani Keiji, a Japanese philosopher who lists Nietzsche as a major influence. Originally, Nietzsche and Asian Thought had been intended to contain a translation of an essay by Nishitani, first published in the 1930s, comparing Nietzsche's Zarathustra to Meister Eckhart, but considerations of time and space prevented this.

The work is targeted primarily at a Western audience and is written in English, with a number of essays translated from other languages (like Indian). However, despite Parkes's efforts to make the anthology accessible, it can be difficult and dense in places, with heavy use of foreign terminology and enough names to "daunt the uninitiated". The inclusion of Asian perspectives enables Western scholars of Nietzsche to see new aspects of his thought, and the work is written to be of interest primarily to scholars of Nietzsche, but also those of comparative philosophy generally.

== Content ==
The work contains 14 essays, split into four sections, covering Nietzsche's relationship to Asia and "others" (three essays, including Parke's introductory essay), Nietzsche and India (four essays), Nietzsche and China (three essays), and Nietzsche and Japan (four essays).

=== Others ===
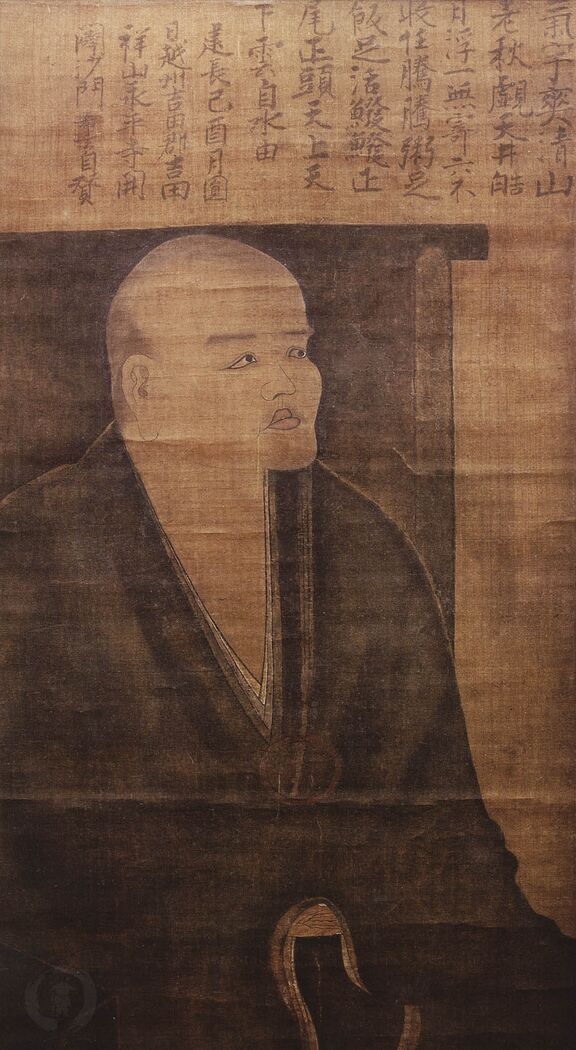
Dōgen, c. 1250. Joan Stambaugh compares the experiences of Zarathustra to the mystical experiences of Dōgen.

"The orientation of the Nietzschean text"
"The orientation of the Nietzschean text" is an essay by Parkes that serves as an introduction to Nietzsche and Asian Thought. In addition to introducing the work and summarising the other essays, Parkes discusses the extent of Nietzschean scholarship in Asia both following Nietzsche's collapse, and at the time of Nietzsche and Asian Thought's publication. He also considers the implications of Nietzsche's use of a travel metaphor in Human, All Too Human, concluding that responses from foreign interpreters may serve to "open us to hitherto concealed aspects of the corpus."

"The other Nietzsche"
"The other Nietzsche" was written by Joan Stambaugh. The essay addresses a specific aspect of Nietzsche, which Stambaugh calls the "other" Nietzsche; specifically, the idea of "Nietzsche the poet mystic". However, apart from an indirect reference to Dōgen, the essay itself does not explicitly compare Nietzsche and Asian thought; instead, it selects "some strains of Nietzsche's thought that are most consonant with an Eastern temper of experience", allowing readers to reach their own conclusions. Instead, Stambaugh closely considers four sections of Thus Spoke Zarathustra; "Before Sunrise" (part 3, section 4), "On the Great Longing" (part 3, section 14), "At Noon" (part 4, section 10) and "The Drunken Song" (part 4, section 19). The experiences of Zarathustra in these passages can be compared to the mystical experiences of Dōgen and Meister Eckhart.

"Questioning one's 'own' from the perspective of the foreign"
"Questioning one's "own" from the perspective of the foreign" is a hermeneutic essay by Eberhard Scheiffele, translated by Graham Parkes. Scheiffele argues that the concept of the "foreign" is essential to Nietzsche's perspectivism, and that Nietzsche uses foreign perspectives to render odd that which is his own. He then goes on to develop four levels at which Nietzsche uses the foreign to criticise his own, the strongest of which is that European culture can be shown to be strange when seen from the perspective of "foreign" Asian cultures. However, for Scheiffele, although Nietzsche ranks the foreign as higher, he is concerned primarily with the criticism of his own from the perspective of the foreign. Nietzsche's heavy use of optical metaphors encourages the reader to deliberately and consciously step outside of their own tradition, allowing them to view it from multiple angles that would otherwise have been impossible. This allows them to develop the most potent form of "seeing"; that is, a "simultaneous seeing" in which an individual is simultaneously able to see their tradition from both within the tradition and from outside it.

=== India ===
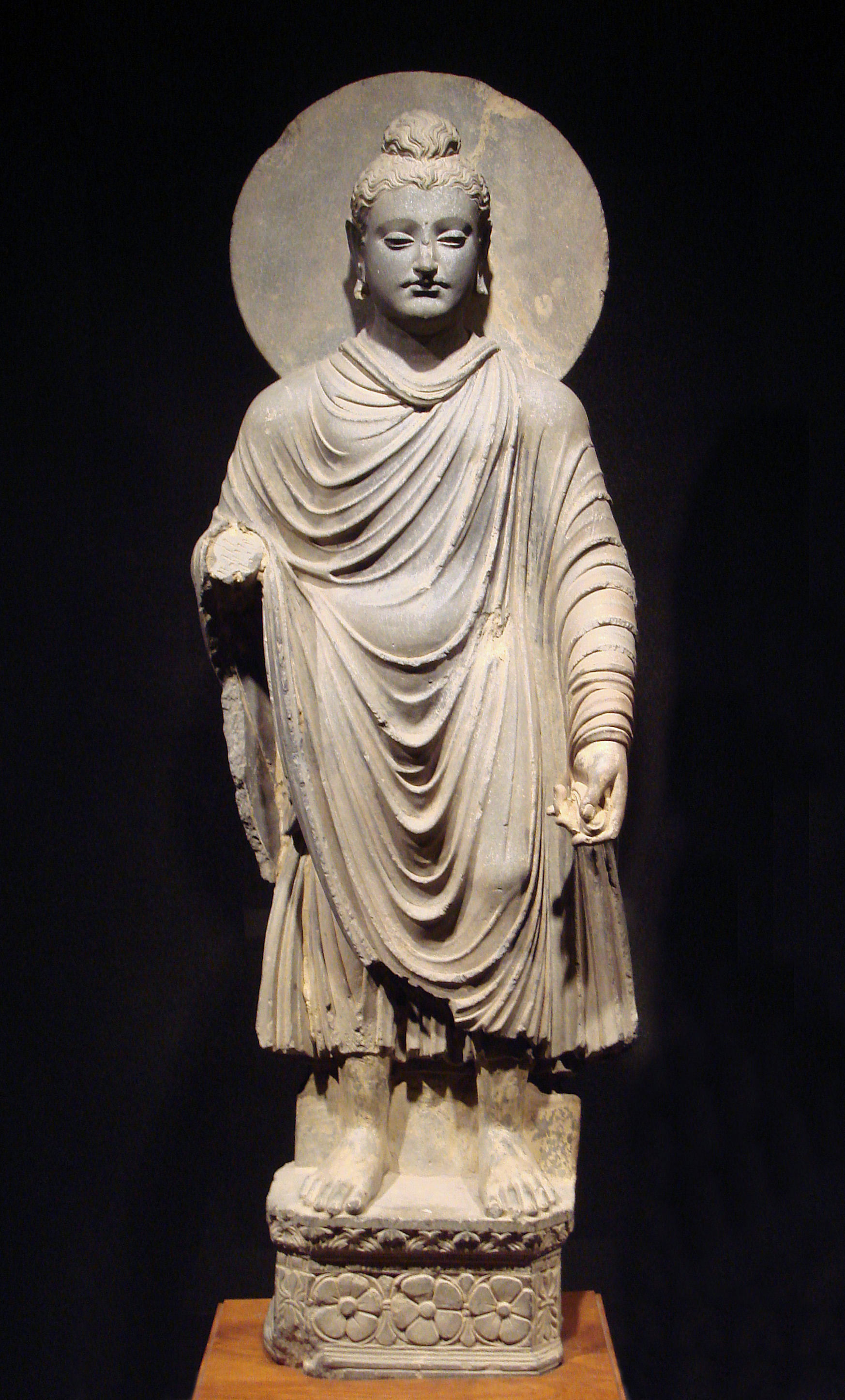
Michel Hulin argues that Nietzsche sees Buddhism, with its historical founder (pictured) and missionary character, as comparable to Christianity, while seeing Brahmanism as of a different nature.

"Nietzsche's early encounters with Asian thought"
"Nietzsche's early encounters with Asian thought" is an essay by Johann Figl, translated by Graham Parkes. Based on studies of both Nietzsche's published and unpublished notes, Figl recounts Nietzsche's encounters with Asian thought while at Pforta, and during his first year of study at the University of Bonn. Figl concludes that Nietzsche was exposed to a considerable amount of Indian thought, despite the fact that his published notes from this period make little mention of it.

"Nietzsche and the suffering of the Indian ascetic"
"Nietzsche and the suffering of the Indian ascetic" is an essay by Michel Hulin, translated by Graham Parkes. Hulin examines Nietzsche's relationship with the idea of Indian asceticism and his apparently contradictory views of the practice. Despite certain strong interpretations, Hulin argues, Nietzsche is wrong about many aspects of India, but appears to value Hindu asceticism, and respect the Brahmins, for a number of reasons. Hulin argues that Nietzsche has a very particular view of Buddhism that is filled with errors, seeing it as an individualist reaction to Brahmanism, and that he compares this "Buddhism" to Christianity. The essay closes with a consideration of Nietzsche's praise for Buddhism's rejection of the metaphysical, but his condemnation for its weakening of the will.

"Nietzsche's trans-European eye"
"Nietzsche's trans-European eye" is an essay by Mervyn Sprung. Challenging the traditional assumption that Nietzsche was well acquainted with Indian thought, Sprung argues that while there is some evidence of it in Nietzsche's work, Nietzsche in fact had very little interest in Indian philosophy in its own right. Sprung claims that the most compelling evidence for this is the fact that he apparently never wrote to his friend Paul Deussen asking about Indian philosophy. In this regard, Sprung may be seen as supporting Scheiffele's thesis with regards to the importance of the foreign in Nietzsche's work.

"Deconstruction and breakthrough in Nietzsche and Nāgārjuna"
"Deconstruction and breakthrough in Nietzsche and Nāgārjuna" is an essay by Glen T. Martin. Martin compares the philosophy of Nietzsche to the philosophy of Nāgārjuna, aiming to illuminate the relationship between their respective attempts to develop "spiritual break-throughs", by considering each thinker in turn. First he looks at Nietzsche's distinct rejection of traditional values, and, subsequently, considers Nietzsche's answer to the problem. Second, Martin looks to Nāgārjuna, tracing his line of thought to the "emptiness" and "ultimate truth", and then to his conception of "liberation". Martin then compares Nietzsche and Nāgārjuna's thought directly, with reference to Nishitani, and concludes that Nietzsche's articulation of nihilism means that the "emptiness" spoken of by Nāgārjuna is something that can now be seen by a great many people.

=== China ===
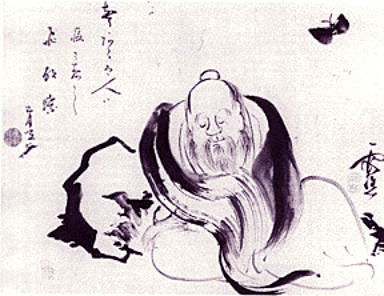
Zhuangzi dreams of being a butterfly, or a butterfly dreams of being Zhuangzi. By comparison, Nietzsche's Zarathustra faces a nightmare of torment.

"Zhuang Zi and Nietzsche: plays of perspectives"
"Zhuang Zi and Nietzsche: plays of perspectives" is an essay by Chen Guying, translated by James D. Sellmann, comparing the respective philosophies of Nietzsche and Zhuangzi. Guying discusses a number of aspects in his essay, considering the philosophers' conceptions of emotions, dreams, escapism, physicality, spiritual freedom and relativism, as well as the world in which they lived and their engagement with it. He concludes the essay by listing nine similarities between the two, as well as five major differences, closing the essay with four criticisms. The piece is a modification of an excerpt from Guying's Beiju Zhexuejia Nicai (The Tragic Philosopher Nietzsche), and is, according to Parkes, "exemplary of modern Chinese scholarship on Nietzsche".

"Nietzsche's 'will to power' and Chinese 'virtuality' (de): a comparative study"
"Nietzsche's 'will to power' and Chinese 'virtuality' (de)" is a comparative essay by Roger T. Ames, considering the relationship between Nietzsche's will to power and the notion of de in Chinese philosophy. Ames attempts to reconstruct the disparate notions of de into a single "classical Chinese notion" by drawing out the cosmological and aesthetic principles underlying the ethical notion of de in Confucianism, and the ethical and social implications of the primarily cosmological de in Daoism. He interprets Nietzsche's will to power as "an alternative to mechanistic physics", an undogmatic cosmology; the term "cosmology" must be redefined if applied to Nietzsche. For Ames, Nietzsche's notion of "power" is the separating factor between Nietzsche's "aesthetic perspectivism" from an "anything-goes relativism". Having outlined his understanding of the two notions, Ames goes on to compare de with the will to power, concluding that there is "some common ground in the notion of overcoming ego-self", but that there remain significant differences; for instance, while de celebrates "enjoyment", Nietzsche's Übermensch strives for personal joy.

"The highest Chinadom: Nietzsche and the Chinese mind, 1907-1989"
"Nietzsche and the Chinese mind" is an essay by David A. Kelly. After explaining that a nihilism similar to that found in Nietzsche's Europe can be found in China, Kelly outlines the influence Nietzsche's thought had upon Lu Xun, one of the first Chinese thinkers to consider Nietzsche, and Li Shicen, whom he describes as the "most explicit of Chinese 'Nietzscheans'". Kelly then recounts the view of Nietzsche, and history of Nietzsche scholarship, in China as a whole throughout the twentieth century, concluding that at different times and by different groups, Nietzsche was both admired and despised.

=== Japan ===
"The early reception of Nietzsche's philosophy in Japan"
"The early reception of Nietzsche's philosophy in Japan" is an essay by Graham Parkes.

"Nietzsche's conception of nature from an east-Asian point of view"
"Nietzsche's conception of nature from an east-Asian point of view" is an essay by Ōkōchi Ryōgi.

"The problem of the body in Nietzsche and Dōgen"
"The problem of the body in Nietzsche and Dōgen" is an essay by Arifuku Kōgaku.

"The eloquent silence of Zarathustra"
"The eloquent silence of Zarathustra" is an essay by Sonoda Muneto.

== Reception ==
Alexander Reynolds, whose review of Nietzsche and Asian Thought appeared in the Bulletin of the School of Oriental and African Studies, considers the task of a philosophical dialogue between East and West to be one of great importance, but felt that the work offered little to contribute to this goal. For him, Sprung's piece reveals the lack of interest Nietzsche truly had in Asia, while Nietzsche's reception in Asia can only really be spoken of in Japan, which can be accounted for by Japan's westernization more so than anything else. Reynolds also sees philosophical and philological problems with attempts to offer comparisons between Nietzsche and certain Asian figures. He concludes that, if Nietzsche was to play any part in the convergence of eastern and western philosophy, "it will not be by grace of our elaborating desperately and incredibly on his sporadic Orientalist velleities".

Kathleen Marie Higgins sees Nietzsche and Asian Thought as filling a gap in Nietzsche scholarship. She praises the plurality of contributors, despite the fact that the work was prepared primarily for a Western audience, and is also complimentary of the way in which "the volume's comparative essays attempt to do justice to the dissimilarities of both context and concept in cases where Nietzsche's ideas appear prima facie to resemble those of particular Eastern thinkers", thus rendering "more striking the real similarities between Nietzsche's thought and Asian ideas." She criticises the absence of an essay on Nietzsche's reception in India, but conceded that it was perhaps not comparable to his reception in China or Japan. She concludes by saying that "As a work in comparative philosophy, Nietzsche and Asian Thought is exemplary. Its comparative approach is incisive yet accessible. I consider it a 'must read' for English-speaking Nietzsche scholars and comparativists alike."

== Legacy ==
Nietzsche and Asian Thought represents a significant contribution to the scholarship on Nietzsche's relationship with Asian philosophy, and subsequent works that failed to take account of its scholarship have received criticism on that score. However, since the time of its publication, some of the scholarship has been superseded; for instance, in 2004, Thomas H. Brobjer published a more extensive account of Nietzsche's reading than that offered by Figl, and, based on that evidence, argues that Sprung had underestimated the amount of Indian philosophy that Nietzsche had read. Other writers have challenged the conclusions entirely; S. M. Amadae, though acknowledging that Nietzsche and Asian Thought features "state of the art" scholarship reaching conclusions typical of work in the area, feels that the work shows that "the extent to which [Nietzsche] developed his thought in dialogue with the East is almost wholly unacknowledged." Instead, Amadae argues that Indian philosophy (and, specifically, Theravada Buddhism) were "biographically and intellectually relevant" to Nietzsche's philosophy.

Writing in 2008, Purushottama Bilimoria argues that the approach taken in Nietzsche and Asian Thought is one of three taken to the relationship between Nietzschean and Asian philosophy. For Bilimoria, the school represented by Nietzsche and Asian Thought "indicates that Nietzsche did not pay serious attention to Asian thought", but that Nietzsche's thinking "had an impact on Asian thinking up to modern times." By comparison, other approaches come from Nietzsche and Buddhism: Prolegomenon to Comparative Study (1981) by Freny Mistry and Nietzsche and Buddhism: A Study in Nihilism and Ironic Affinities (1997) by Robert G. Morrison. For Bilimoria, Mistry's account "underscores the positive influence that Asian thought had on Nietzsche’s philosophy, especially in light of the new direction he sought to give to Western intellectual culture", while Morrison "argues that Nietzsche looked at Buddhism to find an anchor for his thesis of the ‘physiological origins’ of religion that would supersede the prevailing ‘transcendental ones’."

A special issue of the Journal of Nietzsche Studies was published in 2004, aiming to build upon Nietzsche and Asian Thought, which editor Peter S. Groff called "pioneering", as well as subsequent scholarship on the relationship between the thought of Nietzsche and Asian philosophy. The journal contained six articles on the subject. The first three, "Nietzsche's reading about eastern philosophy", by Thomas H. Brobjer, "Nietzsche's Hinduism, Nietzsche's India: another look", by David Smith, and "The 'exotic' Nietzsche—East and West", by Hans-Georg Moeller, relate to Nietzsche's knowledge of Asian philosophy, and interpretations of Nietzsche in Asia. The remaining three, "Wandering beyond the bounds: nomadism, health, and self-undermining", by Steve Coutinho and Geir Sigurdsson, "Zen after Zarathustra: the problem of the will in the confrontation between Nietzsche and Buddhism" by Bret W. Davis, and "Al-Kindī and Nietzsche on the Stoic art of banishing sorrow" by Peter S. Groff, are dialogues between Nietzsche and Asian figures.
