= Elisabeth Förster-Nietzsche =

Sister of Friedrich Nietzsche (1846–1935)

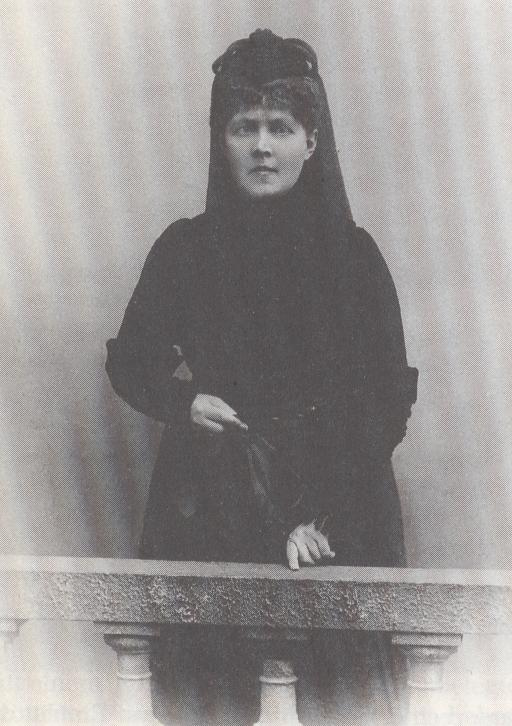
- Elisabeth Förster-Nietzsche, c. 1894
- Born: Therese Elisabeth Alexandra Nietzsche; 10 July 1846; Röcken, Province of Saxony, Prussia
- Died: 8 November 1935 (aged 89); Weimar, Nazi Germany
- Known for: Sister of philosopher Friedrich Nietzsche; Founder of Nueva Germania
- Political party: German National People's Party
- Spouse: Bernhard Förster
- Parents: Carl Ludwig Nietzsche; Franziska Nietzsche

Therese Elisabeth Alexandra Förster-Nietzsche (10 July 1846 – 8 November 1935) was the sister of philosopher Friedrich Nietzsche and the creator of the Nietzsche Archive in 1894.

Förster-Nietzsche was two years younger than her brother. Their father was a Lutheran pastor in the German village of Röcken bei Lützen. The two children were close during their childhood and early adult years. However, they grew apart in 1885, when Förster-Nietzsche married Bernhard Förster, a former high school teacher who had become a prominent German nationalist and antisemite. Nietzsche did not attend their wedding.

Förster-Nietzsche and her husband created an unsuccessful colony, Nueva Germania, in Paraguay in 1887. Her husband committed suicide in 1889. Förster-Nietzsche continued to run the colony until she returned to Germany in 1893 where she found her brother to be an invalid whose published writings were beginning to be read and discussed throughout Europe. Adolf Hitler attended her funeral in 1935.

In the 1950s, it was claimed by Nietzsche's new editors and translators such as Walter Kaufmann that Nietzsche's work had been edited by Förster-Nietzsche to highlight racist and eugenicist themes, but this account has been the subject of debate in recent scholarship. An alternative theory exonerates Förster-Nietzsche and places the distortion of Nietzsche's works in the hands of the Nazis themselves.

== Biography ==
=== Early life ===
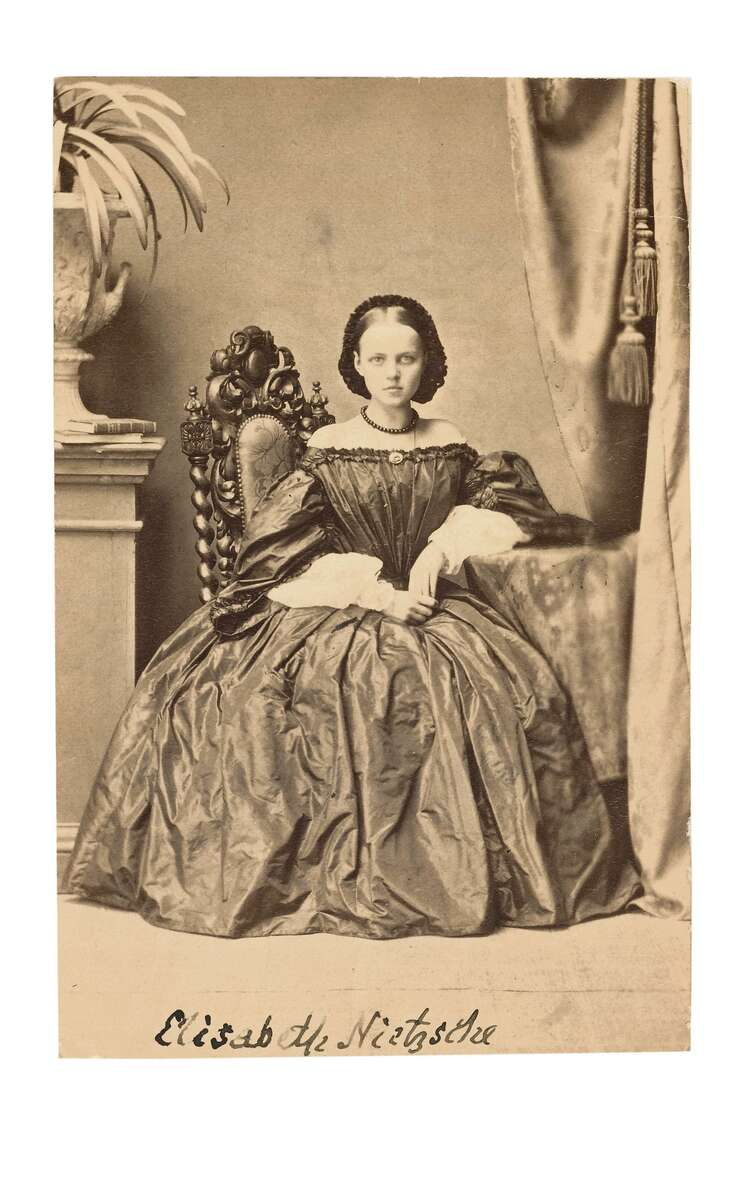
Elisabeth Nietzsche

Therese Elisabeth Alexandra Nietzsche was born in 1846 to Carl Ludwig Nietzsche and Franziska Nietzsche (née Oehler). She was named after three sisters whom her father had tutored: Princess Therese, Princess Elisabeth, and Princess Alexandra of Saxe-Altenburg. Carl Ludwig was a Lutheran pastor in the German village of Röcken bei Lützen. Franziska was a rustic. Carl Ludwig died in 1849. Franziska had no prospects and her husband's pension was insufficient. She chose to rely on the charity of Carl Ludwig's mother, Erdmuthe, and the more distinguished prospects which she could open for the children. When remembering her early life, Förster-Nietzsche would suggest that they may have cried a lot.

Friedrich and Förster-Nietzsche were close during their childhood and early adult years. In 1864, she suggested "that she join him in the new manner of free-thinking he had adopted." He replied that, if she wanted to follow him "into higher intellectual realms" she would have to choose between "views about the world, God, and atonement held by family and society, and the difficult, convention-defying search for truth." Nietzsche took to calling her "Llama" throughout their lives because he felt that the description of the load bearing, saliva spitting, stubborn animal fit her well.

=== Nueva Germania ===
Bernhard Förster planned to create a settlement in the New World and had found a site in Paraguay which he thought would be suitable. The couple persuaded fourteen German families to join them in the colony, to be called Nueva Germania, and the group left Germany for South America on 15 February 1887.

The colony did not thrive. The German methods of farming were not suitable to the land, illness ran rampant, and transportation to the colony was slow and difficult. Faced with mounting debts, Förster committed suicide by poisoning on 3 June 1889. Four years later, Förster-Nietzsche left the colony forever and returned to Germany. The colony still exists as a district of the San Pedro department.

=== Literary career ===
==== Nietzsche Archive ====
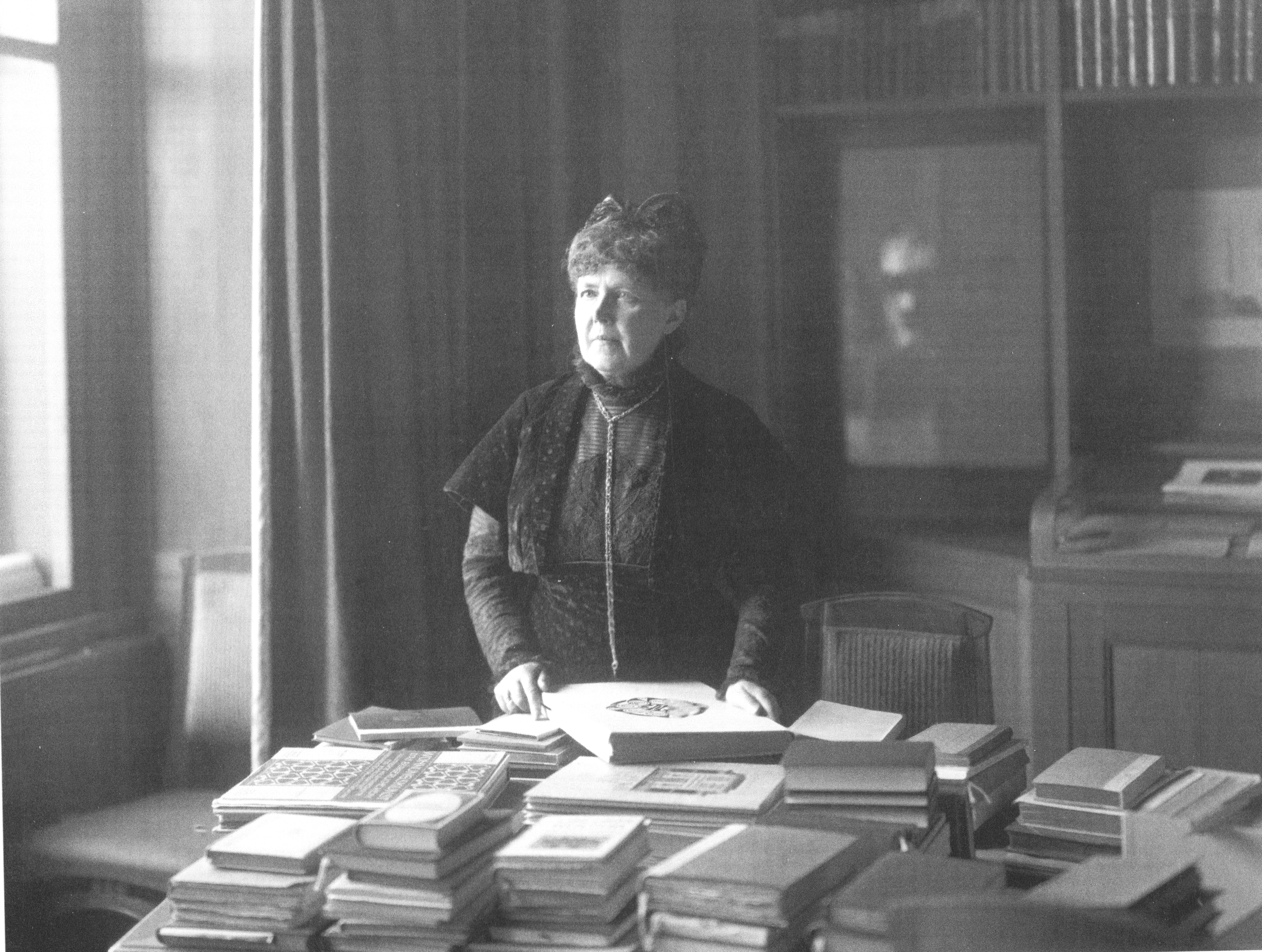
Elisabeth Förster-Nietzsche, 1910, Louis Held.

Friedrich Nietzsche's mental collapse occurred in 1889 (he died in 1900), and upon Elisabeth's return in 1893 she found him an invalid whose published writings were beginning to be read and discussed throughout Europe. Förster-Nietzsche took a leading role in promoting her brother, especially through the publication of a collection of Nietzsche's fragments under the name of The Will to Power.

==== Nobel Prize in Literature ====
For Förster-Nietzsche's collective work on the Nietzsche archives, she was eventually nominated four times for the Nobel Prize in Literature.

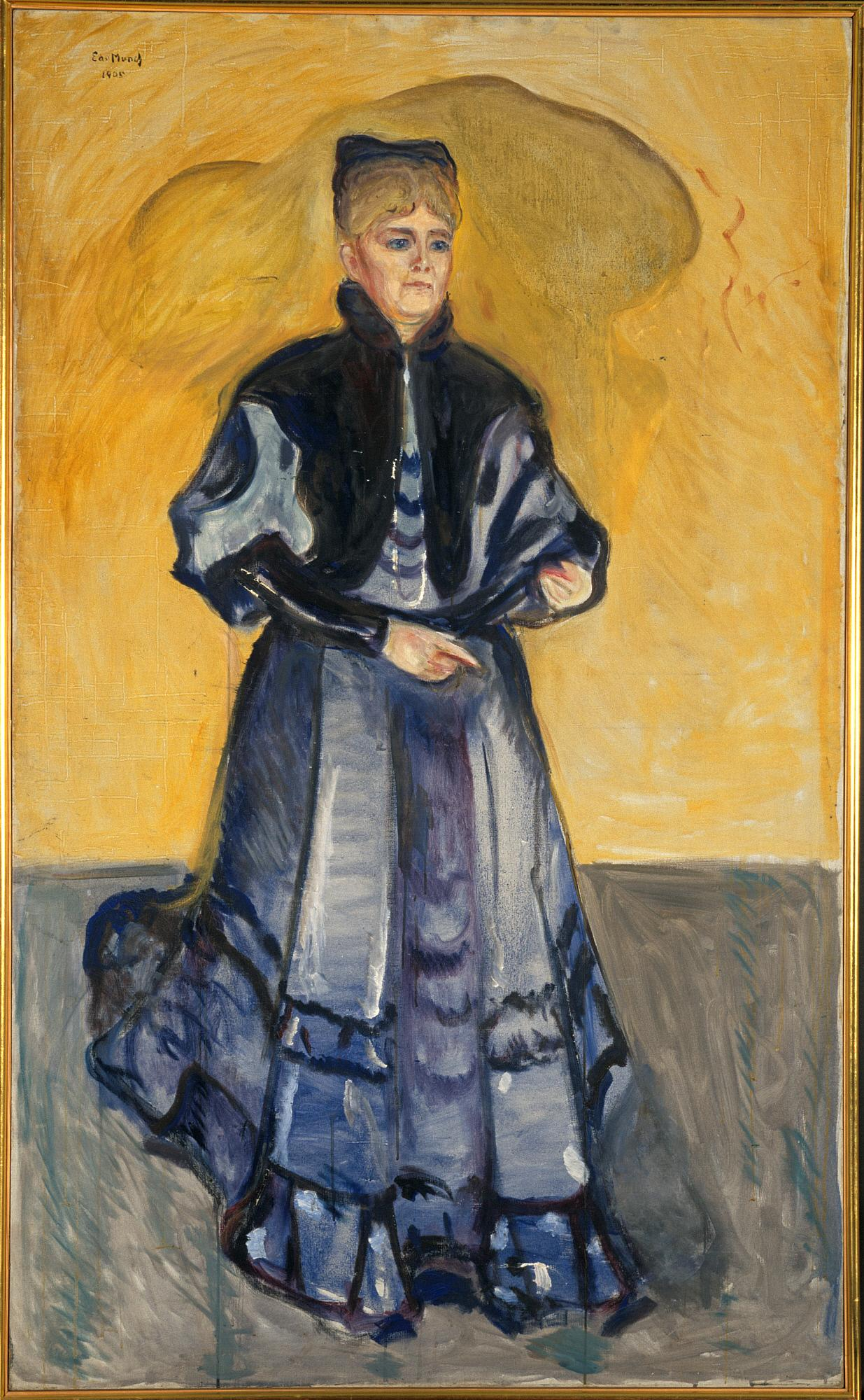
Elisabeth Förster-Nietzsche, Edvard Munch, 1906.

She was first nominated in 1908 by German philosopher Hans Vaihinger of Martin Luther University Halle-Wittenberg. The Nobel Committee acknowledged the significance of her nomination and the publication of a comprehensive biography of her brother, Friedrich, to which they commented:

"It contains a wealth of material for knowledge of Nietzsche's life and development, but is reasonably uncritical and anecdotal and partly extremely biased towards Nietzsche and partly biased very biased towards people who have been displeasing to the author."

In 1916, she was nominated jointly by Vaihinger and Harald Hjärne, a member of the Swedish Academy. In the deliberations, Nobel Committee member Per Hallström expressed that

"the Nietzsche biography in question, which would constitute the actual entry document for the Nobel Prize for [Förster-Nietzsche], can hardly be regarded as anything more than an interesting, but by no means objectively and critically prepared or arranged, collection of works. It can also be questioned whether Nietzsche's person and activities may be considered to represent such a cultural value that is in some way connected to the purpose of the Nobel Foundation."

Furthermore, Hallström noted that Vaihinger's proposal "seems to be primarily concerned with awarding the prize to the Nietzsche archive in Weimar." The Swedish Academy though has the authority to award a Nobel Prize to any institution or association', in this case there is hardly any reason to do so. In 1917, she was nominated once again by Vaihinger but the Nobel Committee immediately put her name aside, commenting:

"Elisabeth Förster-Nietzsche should also now, as [we] advised last year, be left aside, because her purely literary merits, whatever one may think of her activities for the preservation of her brother's memory, are not of any higher order."

In 1923, Förster-Nietzsche received her last of the four Nobel nominations from classical philologist Georg Goetz, professor of German literature Ernst Bertram, historian Kurt Breysig and philosopher Hans Vaihinger. Upon receiving the recommendation, the Nobel Committee immediately withdrew her name in creating their shortlist, commenting that

"this proposal, which probably originated rather from admiration and piety for Nietzsche, than from an every-higher appreciation for her sister's beautiful biography of him, has not been considered to be worthy of recommendation, – now as before."

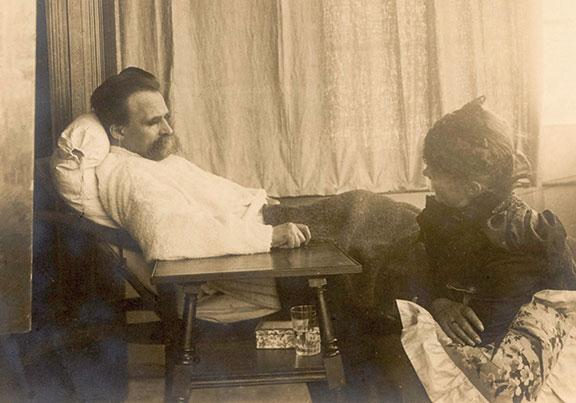
Nietzsche and Elisabeth in 1899.

=== Affiliation with the Nazi Party ===
The common account presented by Nietzsche editors and translators in the 1950s was that in 1930, Förster-Nietzsche, a German nationalist and antisemite, became a supporter of the Nazi Party and, as has been traditionally claimed, that she falsified Nietzsche's work to make it a better fit to Nazi ideology. This narrative is now disputed by recent scholarship, which argues that Elisabeth's motivation in selectively editing Nietzsche's works was primarily intended to protect her brother from criticism and to present herself as being close to him.

When Hitler came to power in 1933, the Nietzsche Archive received financial support and publicity from the government, in return for which Förster-Nietzsche bestowed her brother's considerable prestige on the regime. Förster-Nietzsche's funeral in 1935 was attended by Hitler and several high-ranking German officials. Despite such close connections, she never became a member of the Nazi Party; she joined the German National People's Party in 1918.

== Publications ==
- Das Leben Friedrich Nietzsches, 3 Bände ("The Life of Friedrich Nietzsche", 3 volumes; Vol. I: 1895, Vol. II/1: 1897, Vol. II/2: 1904)
- Das Nietzsche-Archiv, seine Freunde und seine Feinde ("The Nietzsche Archive, His Friends and His Enemies", 1907)
- Das Leben Friedrich Nietzsches, 2 Bände ("The Life of Friedrich Nietzsche", 2 volumes);
  - Bd. 1: Der junge Nietzsche ("Vol. 1: The Young Nietzsche", 1912)
  - Bd. 2: Der einsame Nietzsche ("Vol. 2: The Lonely Nietzsche", 1914)
- Wagner und Nietzsche zur Zeit ihrer Freundschaft ("Wagner and Nietzsche at the Time of their Friendship", 1915)
- Nietzsche und sein Werk ("Nietzsche and His Work", 1928; edited with Henri Lichtenberger)
- Friedrich Nietzsche und die Frauen seiner Zeit ("Friedrich Nietzsche and the Women of His Time", 1935)
- Nietzsche, Friedrich; Wagner, Richard (1921). Foerster-Nietzsche, Elizabeth (ed.). The Nietzsche-Wagner Correspondence. Translated by Kerr, Caroline V. Introduction by H.L. Mencken. New York: Boni & Liveright. ISBN 087140-510-5.

== Sources ==
- Diethe, Carol, Nietzsche's Sister and the Will to Power, Urbana: University of Illinois Press, 2003. (A biography of Elisabeth Förster-Nietzsche)
- Macintyre, Ben, Forgotten Fatherland: The Search for Elisabeth Nietzsche, New York: Farrar Straus Giroux, 1992.
