= Carl Ludwig Nietzsche =

Lutheran pastor and father of Friedrich Nietzsche

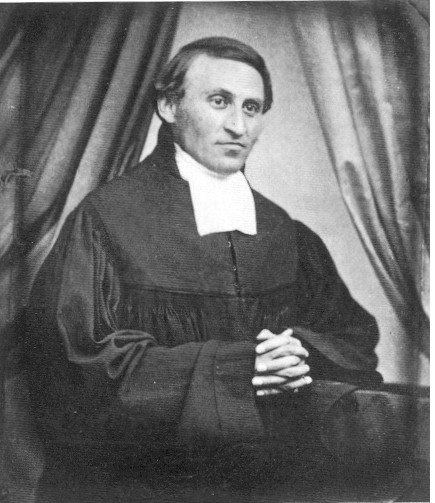
- Carl Ludwig Nietzsche in 1847
- Born: 10 October 1813
- Died: 30 July 1849 (aged 35)
- Occupation: Minister

Carl Ludwig Nietzsche (10 October 1813 – 30 July 1849) was a German Lutheran pastor and the father of the philosopher Friedrich Nietzsche.

== Biography ==
In his son Friedrich's youth memoirs, written when he was only fourteen, he described his father as a cheerful and well-loved man, the "very picture of a country parson".

During a visit to his fellow clergyman David Ernst Oehler, the pastor of the neighboring parish of Pobles, Carl Ludwig met Oehler's youngest daughter Franziska. The young pastor made a strong impression on Franziska with his improvisations on the piano. They were married on his thirtieth birthday, 10 October 1843, when she was seventeen.

A little over a year into their marriage, they welcomed the birth of a son, who was christened Friedrich Wilhelm because the date coincided with the birthday of Carl Ludwig's royal benefactor.

In 1846 Carl Ludwig described his son in a letter:

Brother Fritz is a wild boy, who can sometimes be controlled only by his Papa, inasmuch as the "rod" is never far from him; but now someone else helps more powerfully, and that is the dear Holy Christ, who has already taken hold of even little Fritz by head and heart, so that he wants to hear and speak of nothing but the heile Kist ["Holy Ghost"] - it's something very sweet.

In 1846 a daughter named Elisabeth was born. She would later play a decisive but problematic role as administrator of the Nietzsche Archive, which would cause her brother's philosophy to be associated with German nationalism and antisemitism.

Late in the summer of 1848, Carl Ludwig Nietzsche was stricken by a serious illness, to which he succumbed: he died at age 35 on 30 July 1849. Friedrich Nietzsche lived in fear that his father's illness was an inheritable disease, and that he would some day suffer a similar fate. Carl Ludwig's cause of death has been conjectured to be a brain tumor or tuberculosis, and the possibility of a heritable illness has been the subject of much speculation. However, family members, especially Elisabeth Förster-Nietzsche, attributed the illness to a head injury resulting in concussion. To add support to this version of events, she falsified her brother's youth memoirs by expunging the phrase "My beloved father suddenly fell ill in September 1848" and replacing it with the sentence, "In September 1848 my beloved father suddenly became seriously ill as a result of a fall." More specifically, he was said to have tripped over a small dog which was underfoot, and fell down a stone stairwell onto pavement, which caused a concussion from which he died eleven months later.

On 2 August 1849, Carl Ludwig Nietzsche was buried in the village of Röcken. Less than a year later, his youngest son Joseph fell ill and died. Friedrich Nietzsche recorded a dream in which his father rose from the dead, claimed his younger brother, and returned to the grave.
