= Alexander Nehamas =

Greek-born American philosopher (born 1946)

- Born: 22 March 1946 (age 80); Athens, Kingdom of Greece

Education
- Education: Swarthmore College (BA); Princeton University (PhD)
- Thesis: Predication and the Theory of Forms in the 'Phaedo' (1971)
- Doctoral advisor: Gregory Vlastos

Philosophical work
- Era: Contemporary philosophy
- Region: Western philosophy
- School: Analytic philosophy
- Doctoral students: R. Lanier Anderson, Bernard Reginster
- Main interests: Ancient Greek philosophy, comparative literature, aesthetics
- Notable ideas: Art of living as a philosophical tradition

Alexander Nehamas (Greek: Αλέξανδρος Νεχαμάς; born 22 March 1946) is a Greek-born American philosopher. He is an emeritus professor of philosophy and comparative literature and the emeritus Edmund N. Carpenter II Class of 1943 Professor in the Humanities at Princeton University, where he has taught since 1990. He is a member of the American Academy of Arts & Sciences, the American Philosophical Society (since 2016), and the Academy of Athens since 2018. He works on Greek philosophy, aesthetics, Friedrich Nietzsche, Michel Foucault, and literary theory.

== Biography ==
Nehamas was born in Athens, Greece in 1946. He graduated from Swarthmore College in 1967 and completed his doctorate (titled Predication and the Theory of Forms in the Phaedo) under the direction of Gregory Vlastos at Princeton University in 1971. He taught at the University of Pittsburgh and the University of Pennsylvania before joining the Princeton faculty in 1990.

== Philosophical work ==
His early work was on Platonic metaphysics and aesthetics as well as the philosophy of Socrates, but he gained a wider audience with his 1985 book Nietzsche: Life as Literature (Harvard University Press), in which he argued that Nietzsche thought of life and the world on the model of a literary text. Nehamas has said, "The virtues of life are comparable to the virtues of good writing—style, connectedness, grace, elegance—and also, we must not forget, sometimes getting it right." More recently, he has become well known for his view that philosophy should provide a form of life, as well as for his endorsement of the artistic value of television. This view also becomes evident in his book Only a Promise of Happiness. The title itself is later in this work used as one definition of beauty with reference to Stendhal. In that sense, beauty can be found in all media; as Nehamas claims in the same work: "Aesthetic features are everywhere, but that has nothing to do with where the arts can be found. Works of art can be beautiful because everything can be beautiful, but that doesn't mean that anything can be a work of art."

In 2016, Nehamas published a book, On Friendship, based on his 2008 Gifford Lectures. In it, he argues, contra Aristotle, that friendship is an aesthetic, but not always moral or good. In a manner similar to his earlier work, Only a Promise of Happiness, Nehamas compares the relationship of an individual to friends as having similarities to the relationship which an individual can have to artworks. “Like metaphors and works of art, the people who matter to us are all, so far as we are concerned, inexhaustible. They always remain a step beyond the furthest point our knowledge of them has reached—though only if, and as long as, they still matter to us.”

== Selected works ==
- Nietzsche: Life as Literature, Cambridge: Harvard University Press (1985)
- Symposium (translation, with Paul Woodruff) (1989)
- The Art of Living: Socratic Reflections from Plato to Foucault (1998)
- Virtues of Authenticity: Essays on Plato and Socrates (1999)
- Only a Promise of Happiness: The Place of Beauty in a World of Art (2007)
- On Friendship (2016)
