= Idyll =

Short poem

An idyll (/ˈaɪdɪl/, UK also /ˈɪdɪl/; from Greek εἰδύλλιον (eidullion) 'short poem'; occasionally spelled idyl in American English) is a short poem, descriptive of rustic life, written in the style of Theocritus's short pastoral poems, the Idylls (Εἰδύλλια).

Unlike Homer, Theocritus did not engage in heroes and warfare. His idylls are limited to a small intimate world, and describe scenes from everyday life. Later imitators include the Roman poets Virgil and Catullus, Italian poets Torquato Tasso, Jacopo Sannazaro and Giacomo Leopardi, the English poet Alfred, Lord Tennyson (Idylls of the King), and Friedrich Nietzsche's Idylls from Messina. Johann Wolfgang von Goethe called his poem Hermann and Dorothea—which Friedrich Schiller considered the very climax in Goethe's production—an idyll.

== Terminology ==
The term is used in music to refer generally to a work evocative of pastoral or rural life such as Edward MacDowell's Forest Idylls, and more specifically to a kind of French courtly entertainment (divertissement) of the baroque era where a pastoral poem was set to music, accompanied by ballet and singing. Examples of the latter are Jean-Baptiste Lully's Idylle sur la Paix set to a text by Jean Racine, Marc-Antoine Charpentier’s idylle sur le retour de la santé du Roi H.489 and Henri Desmarets' Idylle sur la naissance du duc de Bourgogne set to a text by Antoinette Deshoulières.

In the visual arts, an idyll is a painting depicting the same sort of subject matter to be found in idyllic poetry, often with rural or peasant life as its central theme. One of the earliest examples is the early 15th century Très Riches Heures du Duc de Berry. The genre was particularly popular in English paintings of the Victorian era.

In relationships, an idyll with someone refers to a short, incredibly happy, peaceful, and romantic period of time spent together, often in a scenic or rustic setting. It implies an idyllic, carefree escape from the pressures of modern life, characterized by harmony and simplicity. It can also describe a short, intense romantic affair.

== See also ==
- Arcadia (utopia)
- Et in Arcadia ego
- Pastoral
- John Greenleaf Whittier, Snow-Bound: A Winter Idyl
- William Wordsworth, The Solitary Reaper
- Iyashikei
