= Hymnus an das Leben =

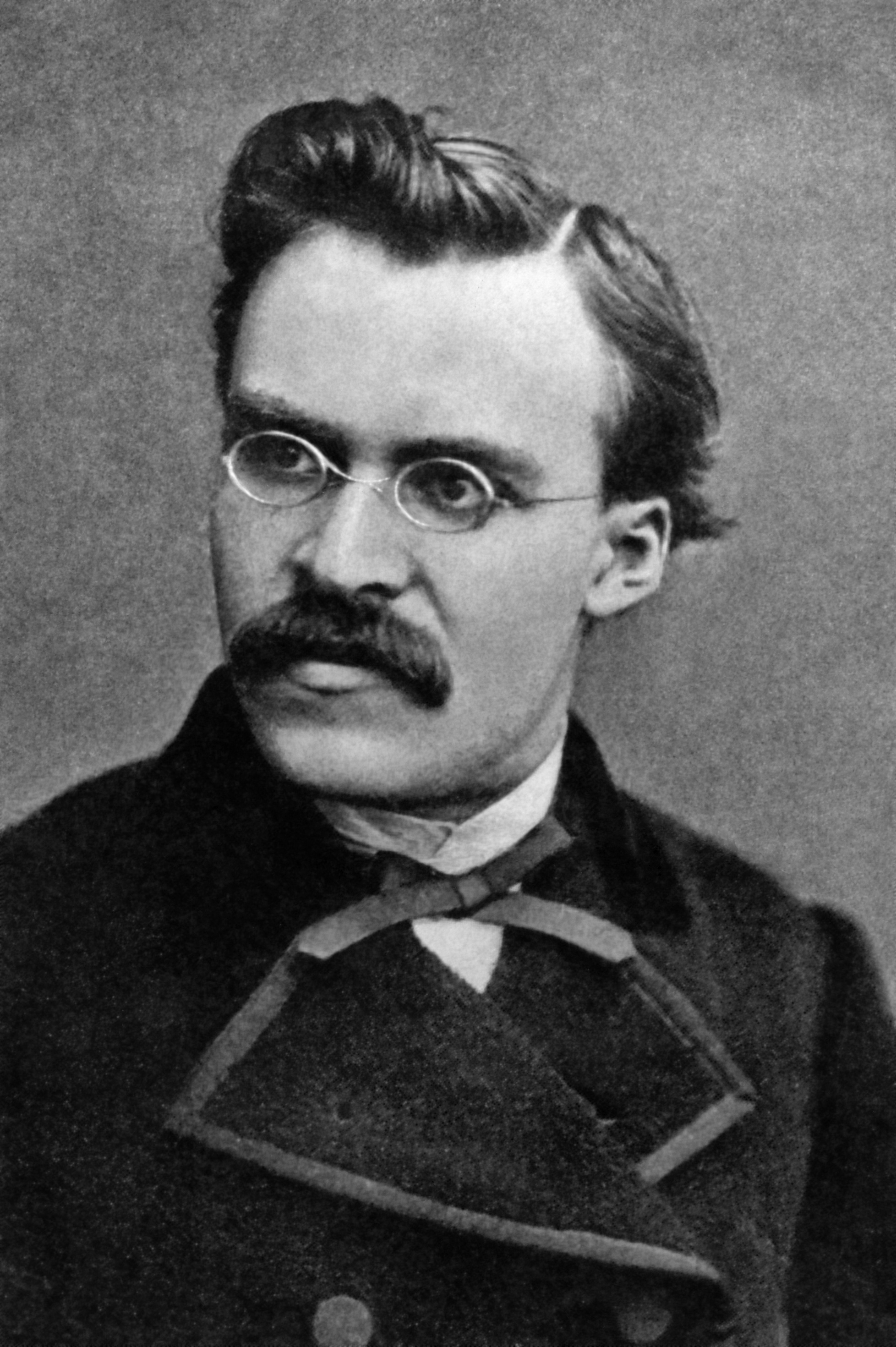
Image of the composer, Friedrich Nietzsche

The Hymn to Life (German: Hymnus an das Leben) is a musical composition for mixed chorus and orchestra by German philosopher Friedrich Nietzsche.

== Origin ==
In 1884, Nietzsche wrote to his friend Peter Gast: "This time, 'music' will reach you. I want to have a song made that could also be performed in public in order to seduce people to my philosophy." With this request, Gast reworked Lebensgebetl into Friendship, and orchestrated it.

== See also ==
- List of works by Friedrich Nietzsche
