= Jessica N. Berry =

American philosopher (born 1972)

Jessica Berry
- Born: 1972 (age 53–54)

Education
- Education: University of Texas at Austin (PhD), University of Puget Sound (BA)

Philosophical work
- Era: 21st-century philosophy
- Region: Western philosophy
- Institutions: Georgia State University
- Main interests: German philosophy, Greek philosophy

Jessica N. Berry (born 1972) is an American philosopher and professor of philosophy at Georgia State University. She is known for her works on Nietzsche, especially in relation to Greek philosophy, and is Executive Editor of The Journal of Nietzsche Studies.

== Education and career ==
Berry earned her Ph.D. in philosophy at the University of Texas, Austin in 2003. She has taught at Georgia State University since 2006. She received a National Endowment for the Humanities Fellowship in 2008.

== Books ==
- Nietzsche and the Ancient Skeptical Tradition (Oxford, 2011)
