= On Truth and Lies in a Nonmoral Sense =

Essay by Friedrich Nietzsche

On Truth and Lies in a Nonmoral Sense (German: Über Wahrheit und Lüge im aussermoralischen Sinne, also called On Truth and Lie in an Extra-Moral Sense) is a philosophical essay by Friedrich Nietzsche. It was written in 1873, one year after The Birth of Tragedy, but was published by his sister Elisabeth in 1896 when Nietzsche was already mentally ill.

== Summary ==
Nietzsche's essay provides an account for (and thereby a critique of) the contemporary considerations of truth and concepts. These considerations, argues Nietzsche, arose from the very establishment of a language:

Every word immediately becomes a concept, in as much as it is not intended to serve as a reminder of the unique and wholly individualized original experience to which it owes its birth, but must at the same time fit innumerable, more or less similar cases—which means, strictly speaking, never equal—in other words, a lot of unequal cases. Every concept originates through our equating what is unequal.

According to Paul F. Glenn, Nietzsche is arguing that "concepts are metaphors which do not correspond to reality." Although all concepts are metaphors invented by humans (created by common agreement to facilitate ease of communication), writes Nietzsche, human beings forget this fact after inventing them, and come to believe that they are "true" and do correspond to reality. Thus Nietzsche argues that "truth" is actually:

A mobile army of metaphors, metonyms, and anthropomorphisms—in short, a sum of human relations which have been enhanced, transposed, and embellished poetically and rhetorically, and which after long use seem firm, canonical, and obligatory to a people: truths are illusions about which one has forgotten that this is what they are; metaphors which are worn out and without sensuous power; coins which have lost their pictures and now matter only as metal, no longer as coins.

These ideas about truth and its relation to human language have been particularly influential among postmodern theorists, and "On Truth and Lies in a Nonmoral Sense" is one of the works most responsible for Nietzsche's reputation (albeit a contentious one) as "the godfather of postmodernism."

Raymond Geuss has compared Nietzsche's view of language, as expressed in this essay, to be similar to that of the later Wittgenstein's, in its de-emphasis of "the distinction between literal and metaphorical usage." A few decades prior Erich Heller had similarly noted a comparison between Nietzsche's thoughts on language and Wittgenstein.

== See also ==
- Beyond Good and Evil
- Deconstruction
- Herd Behavior
- On the Genealogy of Morality
- Untimely Meditations
- Teleology in biology
- Truth
