= Bernard Reginster =

American philosopher

- Awards: Laurence S. Rockefeller Fellowship

Education
- Education: University of Pennsylvania (Ph.D.)
- Thesis: Of Knowing and Willing, and of Willing to Know (1992)
- Doctoral advisor: Alexander Nehamas

Philosophical work
- Era: Contemporary philosophy
- Region: Western philosophy
- School: Continental
- Institutions: Brown University
- Main interests: Post-Kantian philosophy

Bernard Reginster is an American philosopher. He is the Romeo Elton Professor of Natural Theology at Brown University. Reginster is known for his expertise on philosophy of Friedrich Nietzsche, particularly Nietzschean affirmation. He is a recipient of Laurence S. Rockefeller Fellowship. He was also the John N. Findlay Visiting Professor at Boston University for 2023-2024.

== Books ==
The Affirmation of Life: Nietzsche on Overcoming Nihilism, Harvard University Press, 2006

The Will to Nothingness, Oxford University Press, 2021
