= Edmund N. Carpenter II =

American lawyer

- Born: Edmund Nelson Carpenter II; January 27, 1921
- Died: December 19, 2008 (aged 87)
- Occupation: Attorney

Edmund N. "Ned" Carpenter II (January 27, 1921 - December 19, 2008) was an American attorney.

== Early life and education ==
Carpenter was born January 27, 1921 in Wilmington, Delaware, the third and youngest son, of Walter Samuel Carpenter (1888-1976), the first non-family vice president of DuPont, and Mary Louise (née Wootten). He was named after his paternal great-uncle Edmund N. Carpenter. Carpenter earned a BA at Princeton, where he later established the Edmund N. Carpenter II Professorship, then graduated from Harvard Law School, in 1948.

== Career ==
Carpenter led a behind-enemy-lines rescue of seven American airmen from Dien Bien Phu in Indochina in March, 1945. In August, 1945 he helped return several Doolittle Raiders who had been held as POWs since 1942 by the Japanese. He earned a Bronze Star for his service in World War II, and was a past president of the Delaware State Bar Association and of the American Judicature Society. Carpenter died on December 19, 2008.

== Essays ==
In 1938, while a 17-year-old student in Lawrenceville, NJ, Carpenter wrote an essay entitled "Before I die...", setting out the things he hoped to achieve in his life. The essay was read at his 2008 funeral by one of his daughters, Katie Carpenter, and granddaughter, Revell Carpenter Schulte. The essay achieved some acclaim, and was later reprinted in several newspapers, including The Wall Street Journal.

== Personal life ==
On July 18, 1970, Carpenter married Frances Carroll Braxton Morgan Gates (born 1941), at Fair Hall, in Mendenhall, Pennsylvania. The bride is a granddaughter of Philip Francis du Pont of Fairville, Pennsylvania, a lesser known member of the Du Pont family but direct descendant of the company founder Éleuthère Irénée du Pont. She was previously engaged to John David Gates, a Yale graduate of Greenwich, Connecticut. They had six children.

His widow, philanthropist Carroll M. Carpenter, established the Edmund N. and Carroll M. Carpenter Professorship in Psychiatry at Harvard Medical School.
