= Joan Stambaugh =

American scholar and translator

- Born: June 10, 1932
- Died: July 7, 2013 (aged 81)
- Era: 20th century Philosophy
- Region: Western philosophy
- School: Continental
- Main interests: Existentialism, Heidegger

Joan Stambaugh (June 10, 1932 – July 7, 2013) was an American philosopher and professor of philosophy at Hunter College of the City University of New York. She is known for her translations of the works of Martin Heidegger.

== Work ==
She worked with Heidegger directly when she was a student and was a friend to Freiburg i. B. Professor Ute Guzzoni as well as William J. Richardson, S.J. and Manfred Frings. She was an interpreter and translator of Martin Heidegger's writings. She was known for her work on Eastern philosophy as well as her work on the philosophy of time. She was also influential in Nietzsche studies. In addition, she was known for her translation of Being and Time into English.

== Publications ==
- The Formless Self (Albany: State University of New York Press, 1999).
- The Other Nietzsche (Albany: State University of New York Press, 1994).
- The Finitude of Being (Albany: State University of New York Press, 1992).
- Impermanence is Buddha-Nature: Dogen's Understanding of Temporality (The University of Hawaii Press, 1990).
- The Real is Not the Rational (Albany: State University of New York Press, 1986).
- Translator of Martin Heidegger, Being and Time (Albany: SUNY Press, 1996).
- Translator of Martin Heidegger, Identity and Difference (Chicago: University of Chicago Press, 2002). reissued
- Translator of Martin Heidegger, On Time and Being (Chicago: University of Chicago Press, 2002). reissued
- Translator of Martin Heidegger, The End of Philosophy (Chicago: University of Chicago Press, 2002). reissued
