= Graham Parkes =

Philosopher

- Born: 1949 (age 76–77)

Philosophical work
- School: continental philosophy, comparative philosophy
- Institutions: University of Hawaiʻi at Mānoa, University College Cork

Graham Parkes (born 1949) is a comparative philosopher and Professorial Research Fellow at the University of Vienna. He is known for his works on environmental philosophy, Nietzsche, Heidegger, and Asian philosophies.

== Books ==
- Heidegger and Asian Thought, (Honolulu: The University of Hawai'i Press, 1987)
- Nietzsche and Asian Thought, (Chicago: The University of Chicago Press, 1991)
