= Idylls from Messina =

1882 set of eight idylls composed by Friedrich Nietzsche

- Title page for Idyllen aus Messina (German language edition from 1973)
- Author: Friedrich Nietzsche
- Original title: Idyllen aus Messina
- Language: German
- Genre: Poetry
- Publication date: 1882
- Preceded by: Morgenröte. Gedanken über die moralischen Vorurteile
- Followed by: Die fröhliche Wissenschaft

Idylls from Messina (German: Idyllen aus Messina) is a set of eight idylls composed by Friedrich Nietzsche. These poems were written in Sicily during the spring of 1882, where Nietzsche remained for three weeks after arriving from Genoa.

In May 1882, those eight idylls were published in Internationale Monatschrift by Ernst Schmeitzner, Nietzsche's publisher at the time, with whom he would later sever all ties and whom he will eventually sue. They stem from the same voluminous amount of poetic attempts he took upon himself from February to April 1882, from which Nietzsche later composed his Vorspiel in deutschen Reimen to Die fröhliche Wissenschaft in 1882. From these eight poems, Nietzsche used six, in marginally modified form, for the Lieder des Prinzen Vogelfrei, the appendix for the second edition of Die fröhliche Wissenschaft in 1887.
