= Nietzsche Archive =

Archive in Weimar, Germany

Coordinates: 50°58′18″N 11°19′05″E

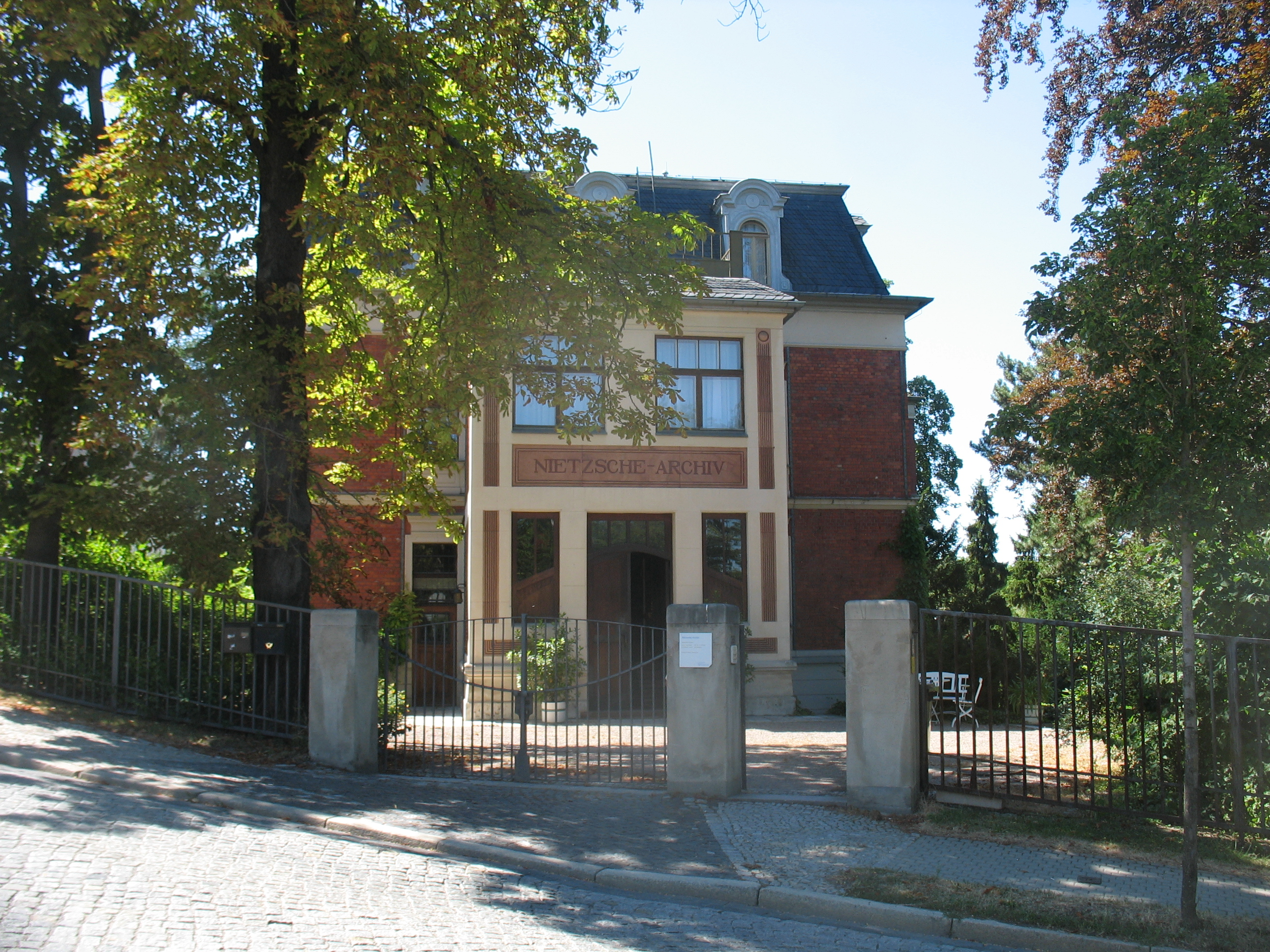
Nietzsche Archive

The Nietzsche Archive (German: Nietzsche-Archiv) is the first organization that dedicated itself to archive and document the life and work of the philosopher Friedrich Nietzsche, all sourced from Elisabeth Förster-Nietzsche, the philosopher's sister.

The Nietzsche Archive was founded in 1894 in Naumburg, Germany, and found a permanent location at Weimar. Its history until the middle of the 20th century was closely tied to its founder and chief for many years, Elisabeth Förster-Nietzsche, the philosopher's sister. Though from its inception the archive came under much criticism for doctoring, or even forging, documents to support certain ideological purposes, the Archive was, until the end of the Second World War, a location of central importance for Nietzsche's reception in Germany. In the GDR it was affiliated with the Nationale Forschungs- und Gedenkstätten der klassischen deutschen Literatur in Weimar (National Research and Memorial Sites of Classical German Literature in Weimar), and formally dissolved in 1956. Its holdings were made accessible for western researchers, most notably Mazzino Montinari, who replaced the dubious old Archiv's Nietzsche editions with new ones. In the GDR, however, Nietzsche was still a forbidden author, with all of his works being banned.

Since German reunification, the archive's holdings are in possession of the Stiftung Weimarer Klassik, now called the Klassik Stiftung Weimar. The archive's domicile, the Villa Silberblick, is now a museum.

== History ==
=== Objectives ===
Elisabeth Förster planned the establishment of a Nietzsche Archive after returning to Germany from Paraguay in the Fall of 1893. The purpose of the archive was to collect resources to keep them from being scattered and to secure a monopoly over their value—not unusual at that time.

From the beginning of the 1890s, the reception of Nietzsche's works in the German-speaking world grew enormously. The Nietzsche Archive attempted to attain the legal rights of interpretation of Friedrich Nietzsche and his philosophies in public discussions. Not only did Elisabeth Förster-Nietzsche's biographies serve these discussions, but also a multitude of journals and newspaper articles which came from the archive and the surrounding areas. Förster-Nietzsche had already collected documents from her admired brother since her youth and then began to buy up all of his mail correspondences for a substantial sum. These letters were therefore also published directly and indirectly by the archive alongside Nietzsche's works. Another reason for the publishing frenzy from the archive and its monopolization of Nietzsche's work might also have been to earn large profits from them.
