= On the Pathos of Truth =

Short essay by Friedrich Nietzsche

"On the Pathos of Truth" (German: Über das Pathos der Wahrheit) is a short essay by Friedrich Nietzsche concerning the motivation of philosophers to seek knowledge as an end in itself. Nietzsche identifies this motivation with pride. On this point the essay prefigures theories concerning a destructive "will to truth" that Nietzsche discusses in On the Genealogy of Morals, Beyond Good and Evil, and The Gay Science.

As an illustration of a motivated seeker of truth, Nietzsche takes Heraclitus, although he also discusses Pythagoras and Empedocles. He recounts Heraclitus as being psychologically distant from other people, due to being aware of truth while others are not:

"...no one will be able to imagine such regal self-esteem, such boundless conviction that one is the sole fortunate wooer of truth. Men of this sort live within their own solar system, and that is where they must be sought....Such a being might seem more comprehensible in a remote shrine, among images of the gods and amidst cold, sublime architecture."

Nietzsche's focus is on the psychology and social life of the philosopher, identifying misanthropy and seclusion as the result of being motivated toward knowledge itself, regardless of any features of the philosopher's cosmology, physics, or epistemology.

Nietzsche concludes the essay by identifying a need to have art along with knowledge. Art is necessary because it adds emotion and purpose to society. Knowledge is limited; for example, a knowledge of matter and motion will not reveal any purpose in the universe. While the motivation for knowledge in itself brings about insights which help society, art allows constant variation which can affirm a sense a purposiveness, which is an emotional need of individuals.

"On the Pathos of Truth" was written in 1872, and was intended to be a preface or foreword, but no book was ever written to follow it. Nietzsche, however, did collect it, along with four other such prefaces to unwritten books, and gave the edition to Cosima Wagner as a Christmas present.
