= Louis Held =

German photographer and photojournalist

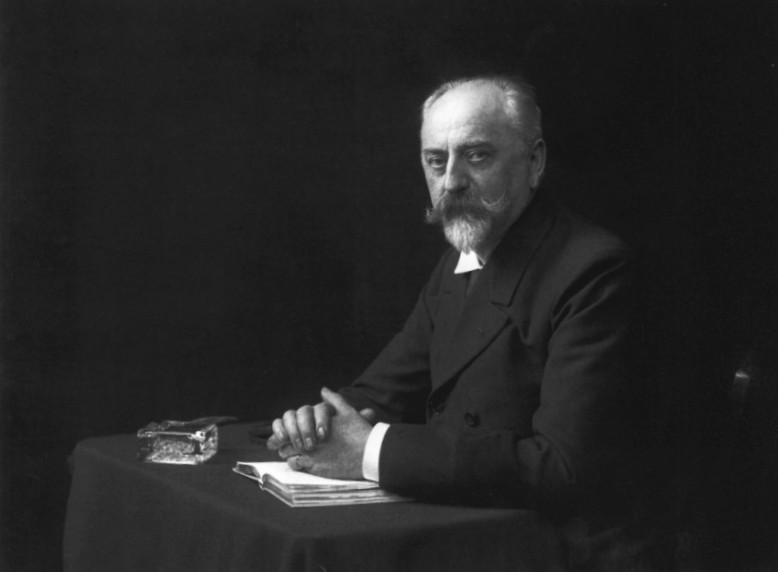
Self-portrait taken 1913

Carl Heinrich Louis Held (1 December 1851 – 17 April 1927) was a German photographer and a pioneer of photojournalism.

Held was raised by relatives after the death of his parents in 1860. He first apprenticed in a company producing silk tissues before beginning a second apprenticeship as a photographer.

He opened his first studio in Liegnitz in 1876, moved three years later to Berlin, and again three years later to Weimar. There, he became a protégé of Franz Liszt and was appointed court photographer of Carl Alexander, grand duke of Saxe-Weimar-Eisenach, in 1888. From 1890 on, he travelled throughout Germany, photographing for illustrated magazines.

In 1912, he opened a cinema in Weimar. In 1923, he experimented with color photography.
