= The Journal of Nietzsche Studies =

Academic journal

- Discipline: Literature
- Language: English
- Edited by: Jessica N. Berry

Publication details
- History: 1991–present
- Publisher: Penn State University Press (United States)
- Frequency: Triannual

Standard abbreviations
- ISO 4: J. Nietzsche Stud.

Indexing
- ISSN: 0968-8005 (print); 1538-4594 (web)
- JSTOR: 09688005
- OCLC no.: 48801014

Links
- Journal homepage; Online access

The Journal of Nietzsche Studies is a peer-reviewed academic journal devoted to the life, thought and writings of Friedrich Nietzsche. The journal is published three times a year by the Penn State University Press and has its editorial home at Georgia State University.

The journal was founded in 1991 as the journal of the Friedrich Nietzsche Society (UK). From 2007 it was housed at City University of New York’s Hunter College under editor Christa Davis Acampora. Its editorial home moved to Georgia State University’s Philosophy Department in 2016 when Jessica N. Berry was appointed editor.
