= Untimely Meditations =

1873–76 collection of essays by Friedrich Nietzsche

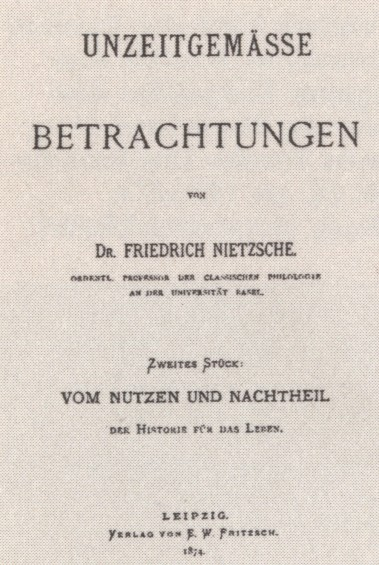
Cover of the first edition of "Vom Nutzen und Nachtheil der Historie für das Leben" (the second essay of the work), 1874

Untimely Meditations (German: Unzeitgemässe Betrachtungen), also translated as Unfashionable Observations and Thoughts Out of Season, consists of four works by the philosopher Friedrich Nietzsche, which he started writing in 1873, and completed in 1876.

The work consists of a collection of four (out of a projected 13) essays concerning the contemporary condition of European, especially German, culture. A fifth essay, published posthumously, had the title "We Philologists", and gave as a "task of philology: to disappear". Nietzsche here began to discuss the limitations of empirical knowledge, and presented what would appear compressed in later aphorisms. It combines the naivete of The Birth of Tragedy with the beginnings of his more mature polemical style. It was Nietzsche's most humorous work, especially for the essay "David Strauss: the Confessor and the Writer."

== Publication history ==
Unzeitgemässe Betrachtungen has been one of the more difficult of Nietzsche's titles to be translated into English, with each subsequent translation offering a new variation. Thus: Inopportune Speculations, Unfashionable Observations or Essays in Sham Smashing (H. L. Mencken, 1908), Thoughts Out of Season (Ludovici, 1909), Untimely Reflections (Ronald Hayman, 1980), Untimely Meditations (Hollingdale, 1983), and Unmodern Observations (Arrowsmith, 2011).

Many different plans for the series are found in Nietzsche's notebooks, most of them showing a total of thirteen essays. The titles and subjects vary with each entry, the project conceived to last six years (one essay every six months). A typical outline dated "Autumn 1873" reads as follows:

1. The Cultural Philistine
2. History
3. The Philosopher
4. The Scholar
5. Art
6. The Teacher
7. Religion
8. State War Nation
9. The Press
10. Natural Science
11. Folk Society
12. Commerce
13. Language

Nietzsche abandoned the project after completing only four essays, seeming to lose interest after the publication of the third.

== "David Strauss: the Confessor and the Writer" ==
"David Strauss: the Confessor and the Writer" ("David Strauss: der Bekenner und der Schriftsteller", 1873) attacks David Strauss's "The Old and the New Faith: A Confession" (1871), which Nietzsche holds up as an example of the German thought of the time. He paints Strauss's "New Faith"—scientifically-determined universal mechanism based on the progression of history—as a vulgar reading of history in the service of a degenerate culture, polemically attacking not only the book but also Strauss as a Philistine of pseudo-culture.

== "On the Advantage and Disadvantage of History for Life" ==
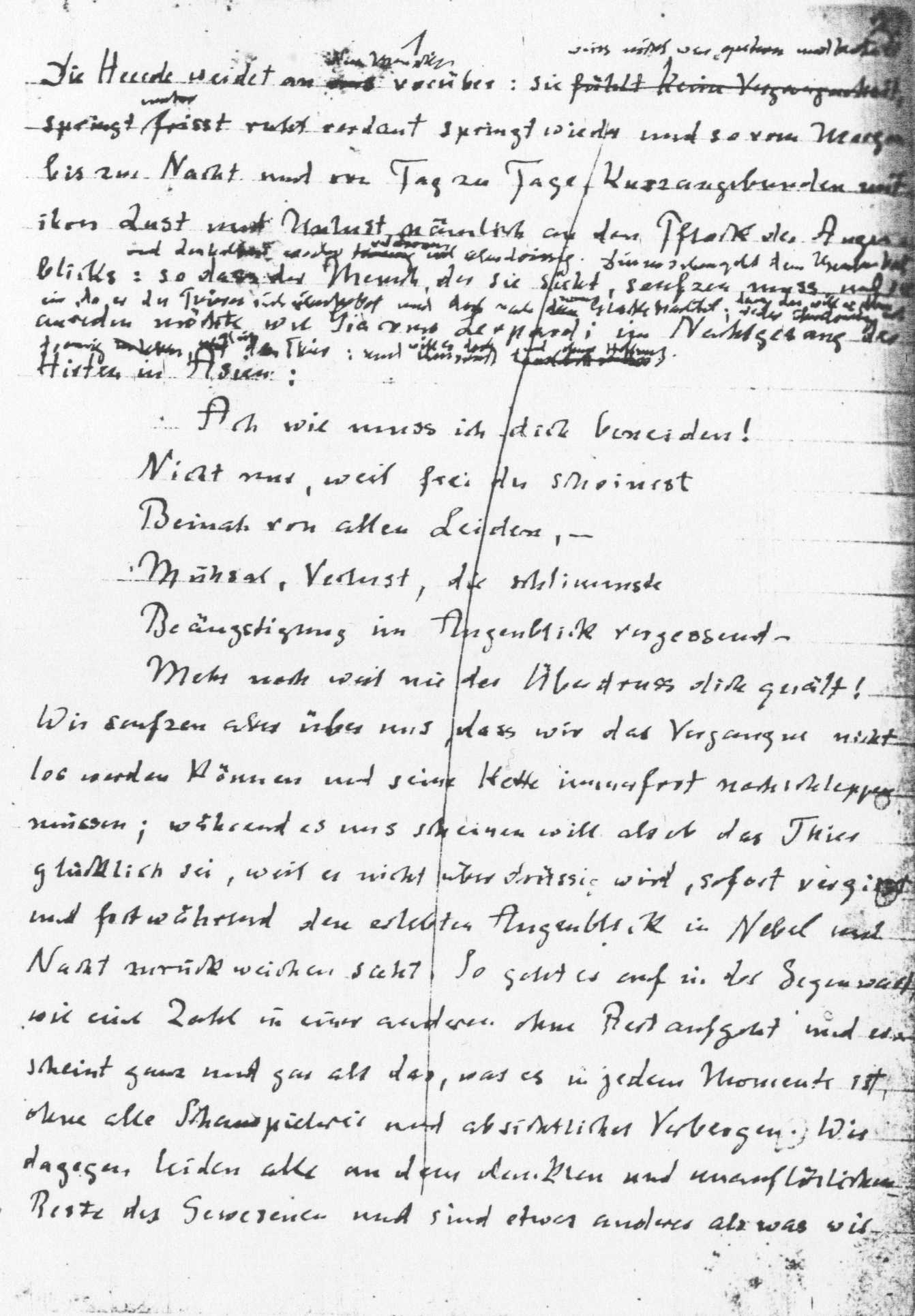
Draft for the first chapter of the second Unzeitgemässe Betrachtung

"On the Advantage and Disadvantage of History for Life" ("Vom Nutzen und Nachteil der Historie für das Leben", 1874) — also known as "On the Use and Abuse of History for Life" — offers, instead of the prevailing view of "knowledge as an end in itself, an alternative way of reading history — one where living life becomes the primary concern, along with a description of how this might improve the health of a society. It also introduces an attack against the basic precepts of classic humanism.

In this essay, Nietzsche attacks both the historicism of man (the idea that man is created through history) and the idea that one can possibly have an objective concept of man, since a major aspect of man resides in his subjectivity. Nietzsche expands the idea that the essence of man dwells not inside of him, but rather above him, in the following essay, "Schopenhauer als Erzieher" ("Schopenhauer as Educator"). Glenn Most argues for the possible translation of the essay as "The Use and Abuse of History Departments for Life", as Nietzsche used the term Historie and not Geschichte. Furthermore, he alleges that this title may have its origins via Jacob Burckhardt, who would have referred to Leon Battista Alberti's treatise, De commodis litterarum atque incommodis (On the Advantages and Disadvantages of Literary Studies, 1428). Glenn Most argues that the untimeliness of Nietzsche here resides in calling for a return, beyond historicism, to Humboldt's humanism, and, maybe even beyond, to the first humanism of the Renaissance.

This particular essay is notable for showcasing the increasingly strident elitism Nietzsche was developing inside his mind. Nietzsche's "untimely" thesis flies directly into the face of demotic modernity in aggressively asserting the dispensability of the majoritarian mass of humanity and history's only meaning residing solely in "great men":

To me, the masses seem to be worth a glance only in three respects: first as blurred copies of great men, presented on bad paper with worn out printing plates, then as the resistance against the great men, and finally as working implements of the great. For the rest, let the devil and statistics carry them off.

== "Schopenhauer as Educator" ==
"Schopenhauer as Educator" ("Schopenhauer als Erzieher", 1874) describes how the philosophic genius of Schopenhauer might bring on a resurgence of German culture. Nietzsche gives special attention to Schopenhauer's individualism, honesty and steadfastness as well as his cheerfulness, despite Schopenhauer's noted pessimism.

== "Richard Wagner in Bayreuth" ==
"Richard Wagner in Bayreuth" ("Richard Wagner in Bayreuth", 1876) investigates the music, drama and personality of Richard Wagner—less flatteringly than Nietzsche's friendship with his subject might suggest. The original draft was in fact more critical than the final version. Nietzsche considered not publishing it because of his changing attitudes to Wagner and his art. He was persuaded to redraft the article by his friend, the enthusiastic Wagnerian Peter Gast who helped him prepare a less contentious version.

== Sources ==
- Schaberg, William H. (1995). The Nietzsche Canon: A Publication History and Bibliography. Chicago: University of Chicago Press. p. 281. ISBN 0-226-73575-3.
- Friedrich Nietzsche, tr. Richard T. Grey, Unfashionable Observations, Stanford, 1995 ISBN 0-8047-3403-8
- Friedrich Nietzsche, tr. Anthony M. Ludovici, Thoughts Out of Season, Edinburgh: The Edinburgh Press, 1909

=== Commentaries ===
- Barbara Neymeyr: Kommentar zu Nietzsches Unzeitgemässen Betrachtungen. I. David Strauss der Bekenner und der Schriftsteller. II. Vom Nutzen und Nachtheil der Historie für das Leben (= Historischer und kritischer Kommentar zu Friedrich Nietzsches Werken. Bd. 1/2). De Gruyter, Berlin/Boston 2020, ISBN 978-3-11-028682-3
- Barbara Neymeyr: Kommentar zu Nietzsches Unzeitgemässen Betrachtungen. III. Schopenhauer als Erzieher. IV. Richard Wagner in Bayreuth (= Historischer und kritischer Kommentar zu Friedrich Nietzsches Werken. Bd. 1/4). De Gruyter, Berlin/Boston 2020, ISBN 978-3-11-067789-8.
