= Caroline V. Kerr =

American journalist and translator

Caroline Victoria Kerr was an American journalist and translator. She was born in Jefferson City, Missouri on June 24, 1866 but lived in the latter years of her life in Berlin, where she died on November 11, 1927. She is perhaps best known as the translator into English of the correspondence between Richard Wagner and Friedrich Nietzsche (for which H. L. Mencken provided an introduction) and also of Wagner's letters relating to the Bayreuth Festival. She wrote frequently on music and the visual arts, and was also the English translator of The Ninth of November by Bernhard Kellermann and several other German novels. At an earlier stage in her career she worked in musical theatre, and (as C.V. Kerr) collaborated with R. H. Burnside on the book and lyrics for the 1914 musical The Dancing Duchess.
