= Matthew Stachiw =

Ukrainian politician (1895–1978)

- Матвій Стахів
- Born: November 30, 1895; Nyshche, Austria-Hungary (now Ukraine)
- Died: June 2, 1978 (aged 82); San Diego, California
- Occupation: Politician

Matthew Ivanovych Stachiw (Note: Ukrainian: Матвій Іванович Стахів, romanized: Matvii Ivanovych Stakhiv) (November 30, 1895 – June 2, 1978) was a Ukrainian politician.

== Early life ==
Stachiw was born on 30 November 1895 in Nyshche, which was then part of Austria-Hungary. He was born into a rural Galician family. He served in the Ukrainian Army between 1918 and 1920. Afterwards received a LL.D. from the University of Prague. He worked as a lawyer in Lviv, university teacher at the people's university "Samoosvita" and editor of several publications. For example, he edited the party publications of Hromadskyi holos, Proty khvyl’, and Zhyve slovo.

Stachiw represented the Ukrainian Socialist-Radical Party in the Executive Committee of the Labour and Socialist International between August 1931 and 1940. Previous to this, he had been party secretary of the Ukrainian Socialist-Radical Part from 1925 to 1929.

After the end of World War II, he emigrated to Germany as a postwar displaced person initially, where he co-founded the Ukrainian National Council and taught sociology and administrative law at institutions such as the Ukrainian Free University in Munich. He then moved to the United States in 1949. There, he was head of the Shevchenko Scientific Society for its United States branch and a member of the Ukrainian Congress Committee of America, the World Congress of Free Ukrainians, and the United Ukrainian American Relief Committee. As of the early 1960s, Stachiw served as editor of the weekly newspaper Narodna Volya (issued from Scranton).

He died on 2 June 1978 in either El Cajon or San Diego in California.
