= Ralph Easley =

Ralph Montgomery Easley
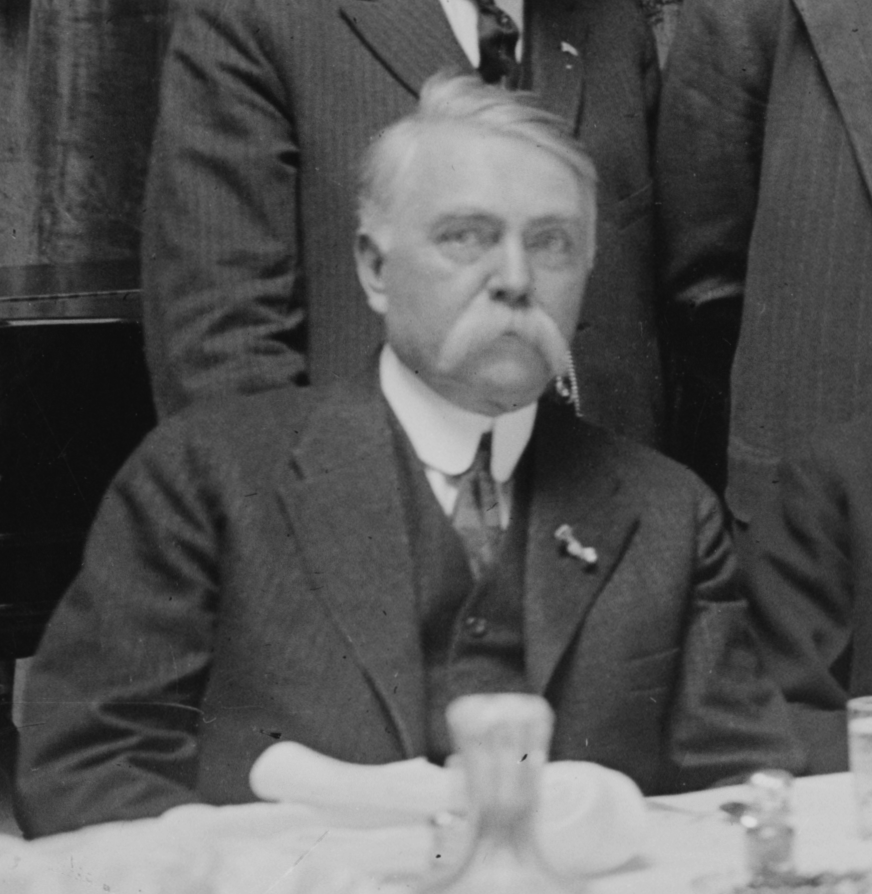
- Easley in 1924
- Born: February 25, 1856
- Died: September 8, 1939 (aged 83)
- Occupations: Journalist, organizer

Ralph Montgomery Easley (February 25, 1856 – September 8, 1939) was an American journalist and political organizer. He was Director of the American political reform group, the National Civic Federation.

== Background ==
Easley was born on February 25, 1856, in Browning, Illinois, the child of Charles J. Easley and Elisabeth Berry. He went to school in Quincy, Illinois.

== Career ==
In 1875, Easley moved to Hutchinson, Kansas, where he was a public school teacher, postmaster, and newspaper reporter. He founded, published, and edited the Hutchinson Daily News. In 1882, he also become postmaster of Hutchinson.

In 1887, he moved to Chicago and became a reporter on the Chicago Inter Ocean, soon specializing in politics and economics. During that time, he formed the Chicago Civic Federation. In 1891, he became a key figure in the Illinois Republican Party. In 1898, he held a first Federation conference in Saratoga, New York, on "The Future Foreign Policy of the United States."

In 1904, Easley left Chicago to found the National Civic Federation in New York, where he was the chairman of the executive council throughout the federation's forty-five-year history.

By 1910, the National Civic Federation was working with US President Howard Taft's Conference of Governors, which the President addressed. Easley strong opposed US official recognition of the Soviet Union (which occurred in 1933)

The National Civic Federation opposed liberal-radical labor unions, particularly the Industrial Workers of the World (IWW or Wobblies); it championed the AFL. It also opposed the Communist Party USA and "all socialistic movements."

Members of the National Civic Federation included New York City Mayor Seth Low and American Federation of Labor (AFL) President Samuel Gompers, as well as former US Senator Mark Hanna, Ambassador August Belmont, former US President Grover Cleveland, and former New York City Mayor John Purroy Mitchel.

In 1936, Easley revealed that he and Gompers used funds from ten US manufacturers to employ "secret agents" to spy in 1915 on Count Johann Heinrich von Bernstorff, Germany's ambassador to the USA. They turned information they obtained over to the federal government. During the New Deal, Easley supported the National Industrial Recovery Act. However, he strongly opposed the Works Progress Administration, run by "czars" and "racketeers." He also attacked WPA writers, the vast majority of whom had "never published a line in their lives, nor had most of the 'actors' been actors" in the WPA theatre.

== Personal life and death ==
In 1881, Easley married Nerva Cheney of Mechanicsburg, Ohio. In 1917, Easley married Gertrude Beeks Easley, who worked with him at the National Civic Federation.

Ralph Montomergy Easley died age 83 on September 8, 1939, at his home in Rye, New York.

== See also ==
- Blair Coan
- Elizabeth Dilling
- Nesta Helen Webster
- Hamilton Fish
- David George Plotkin
