= Blair Coan =

American writer

Blair Coan (also written Coán) (1883–1939) was an American government agent under US Attorney General Harry M. Daugherty and anti-communist, known for his book The Red Web (1925) on early Soviet penetration in the US government, singling out US Senator Burton K. Wheeler. Coan's efforts followed the First Red Scare (1918–1920).

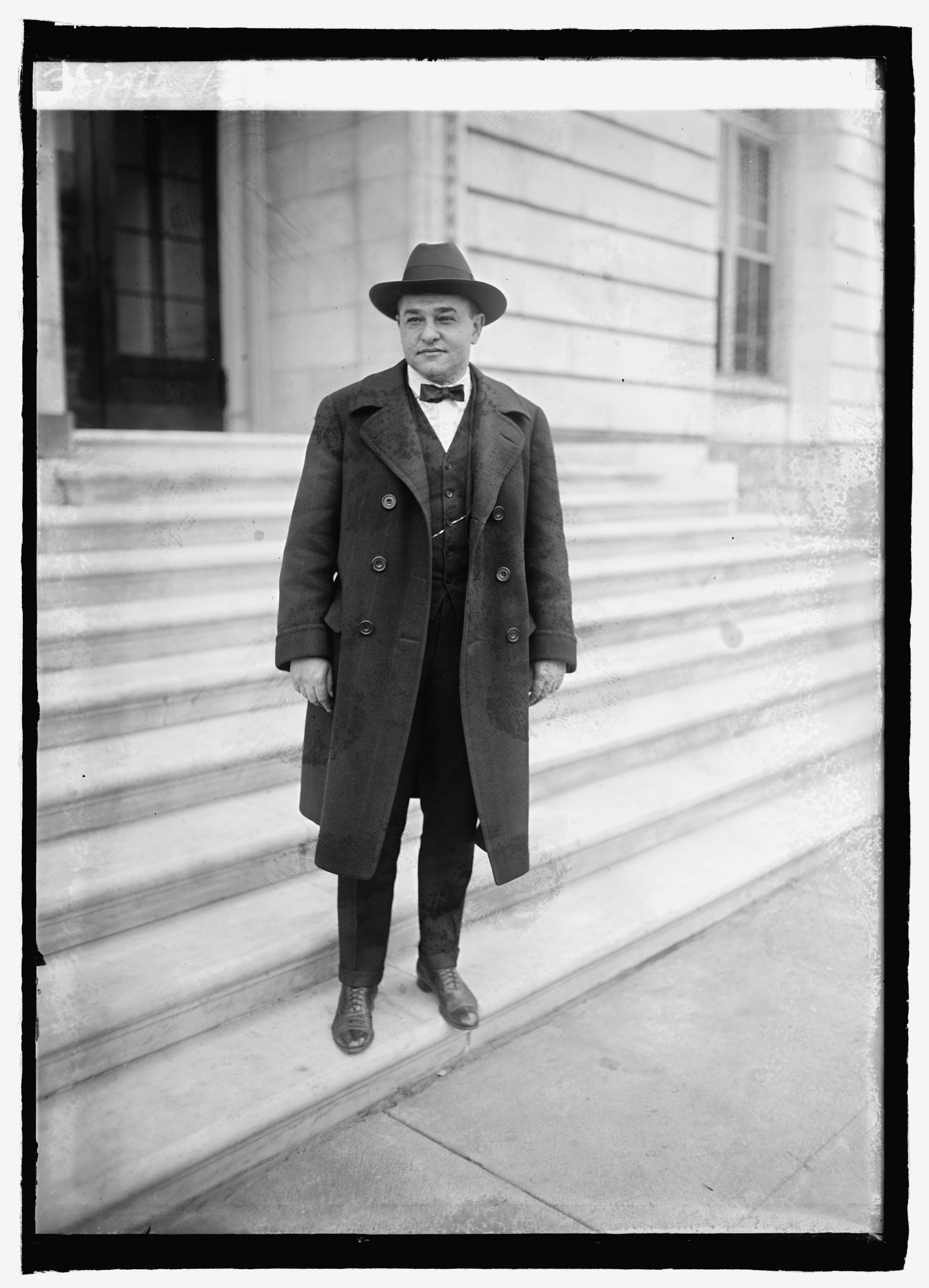

== Career ==
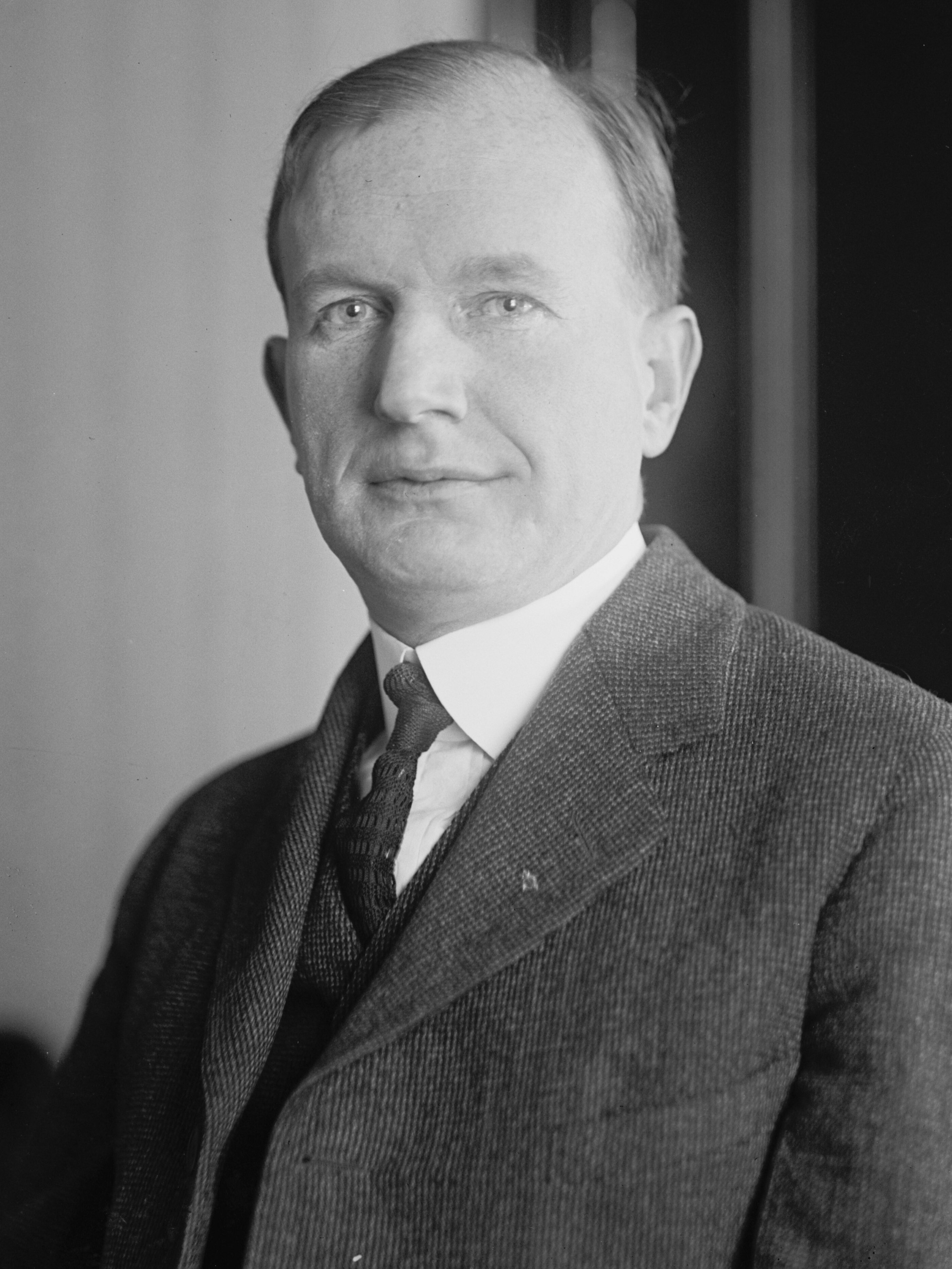
US Senator Burton K. Wheeler (1922), whom Coan attacked in The Reb Web

In 1913, as an "investigator for the senatorial vice commission", Coan reported that the Armory Show at the Art Institute of Chicago showed female forms indecently.

In 1922, as an "operative of the Department of Justice", Coan traveled to Tampico, Mexico, where an American Comintern agent described how Soviet agents were fomenting revolution in Mexico and the United States.

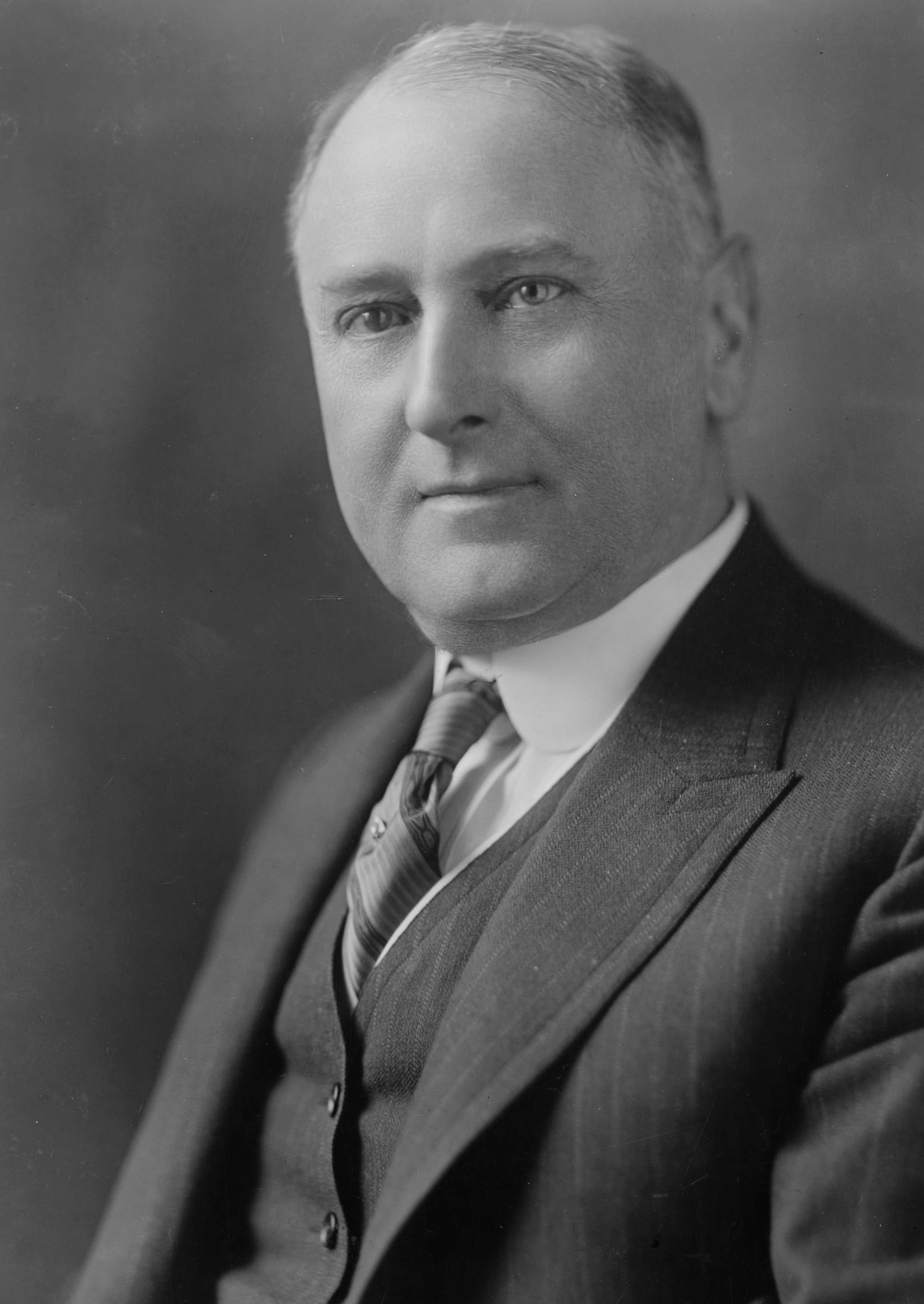
US Attorney General Harry M. Daugherty (1920), under whom Coan worked at the US Department of Justice in the early 1920s

In 1924–25, Wheeler faced investigation, without major impact, even despite publication of The Red Web: An Underground Political History of the United States from 1918 to the Present Time in 1925 by Coan, who fingered Wheeler as center of communist conspiracy. During that time, the CPUSA newspaper the Daily Worker called "M. Blair Coan" an "employee of the Republican National Committee" and reported that Coan was in Great Falls, Montana to investigate Wheeler. Coan accused Wheeler and other congressional representatives elected as part of the progressive movement who worked to undermine US Attorney Generals A. Mitchell Palmer and Harry M. Daugherty and took advantage of the Teapot Dome scandal to do so. According to historian Richard Gid Powers, "Coan was a former operative in the Daugherty Justice Department who had been involved in efforts to frame its critics during the Teapot Dome." Primarily, Coan blamed Wheeler, Robert M. La Follette, and Smith W. Brookhart as "pinks".

In 1937, Coan worked with Francis Townsend to promote his pension plan.

== Legacy ==
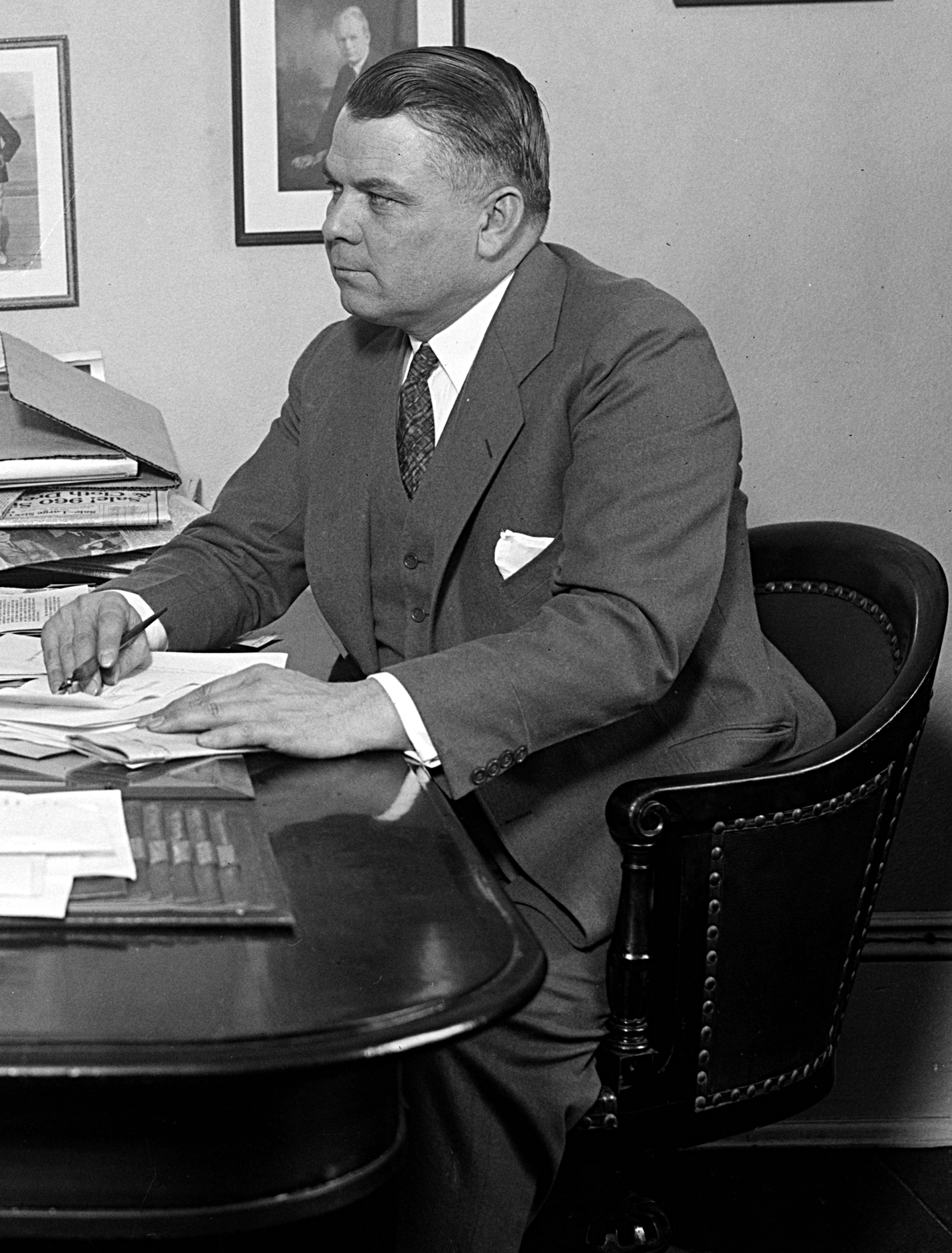
US Representative John B. Sosnowski (1926) cited The Red Web to the US Congress

In 1927, US Representative John B. Sosnowski stated "I would suggest you gentlemen read a book published by Blair Coan, entitled The Red Web", as part of a long list of findings presented during a public congressional hearing.

In 1946, writer David George Plotkin cited The Reb Web as an important sources and discussed it.

In 1955, historian Robert K. Murray called the book "a very much exaggerated account of the Communist menace in the United States".

In 1969, historians Michael P. Malone and Richard B. Roeder called the book "obviously biased but at least intelligible".

In 1998, historian Richard Gid Powers quoted from the book and re-used its title as chapter title. Also in 1998, Beverly Merrill Kelley doubted the authenticity of Coan's initial Comintern source.

In 2014, historians Michael Kazin, Rebecca Edwards, and Adam Rothman cited Coan among "counter-subversive anti-Communists concocting fanciful red web smears" including Daugherty, Richard Whitney, Nesta Helen Webster, Ralph Easley, and Hamilton Fish.

In 2016, historian Nick Fischer called Coan's The Red Web a "paranoid anticommunist tract".

== Works ==
In 1925, Coan described US Senator Burton K. Wheeler as center of an international Soviet conspiracy to take over the United States in his book The Red Web.

- The Red Web: An Underground Political History of the United States from 1918 to the Present Time (1925)
- Blood Money: A Narrative of Today (1927)

== See also ==
- Burton K. Wheeler
- Elizabeth Dilling
- David George Plotkin
- Pinko
- Red flag (politics)
- Overman Committee
