= Henry Zolinsky =

American poet

- Born: Henry Saul Zolinsky; August 3, 1903; New York City, US
- Died: May 2, 2001 (aged 97); Laguna Hills, California, US
- Other name: Henry Zolan
- Occupations: Poet, school teacher
- Years active: 1921–2001
- Known for: Objectivism

Henry Saul Zolinsky (1901–2001) was an American Objectivist poet and friend of Whittaker Chambers, Meyer Schapiro, Louis Zukofsky, and Samuel Roth.

== Background ==
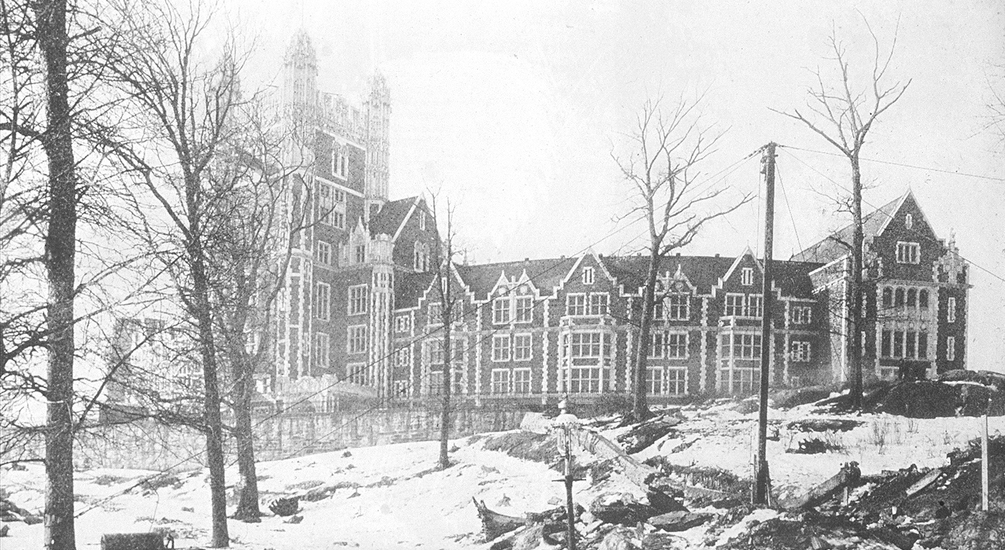
Shepard Hall at City College of New York circa 1907, where Zolinsky studied

Henry Saul Zolinsky was born in 1901. Zolinsky studied at the City College of New York (now often known as "CCNY") in the early 1920s. In early June 1923, Zolinsky interrupted his college studies to sail by ship with friend Meyer Schapiro for Rotterdam and a tour of Europe. In later June, Whittaker Chambers sailed over to Bremerhaven; the three met in Berlin and traveled together.

== Career ==
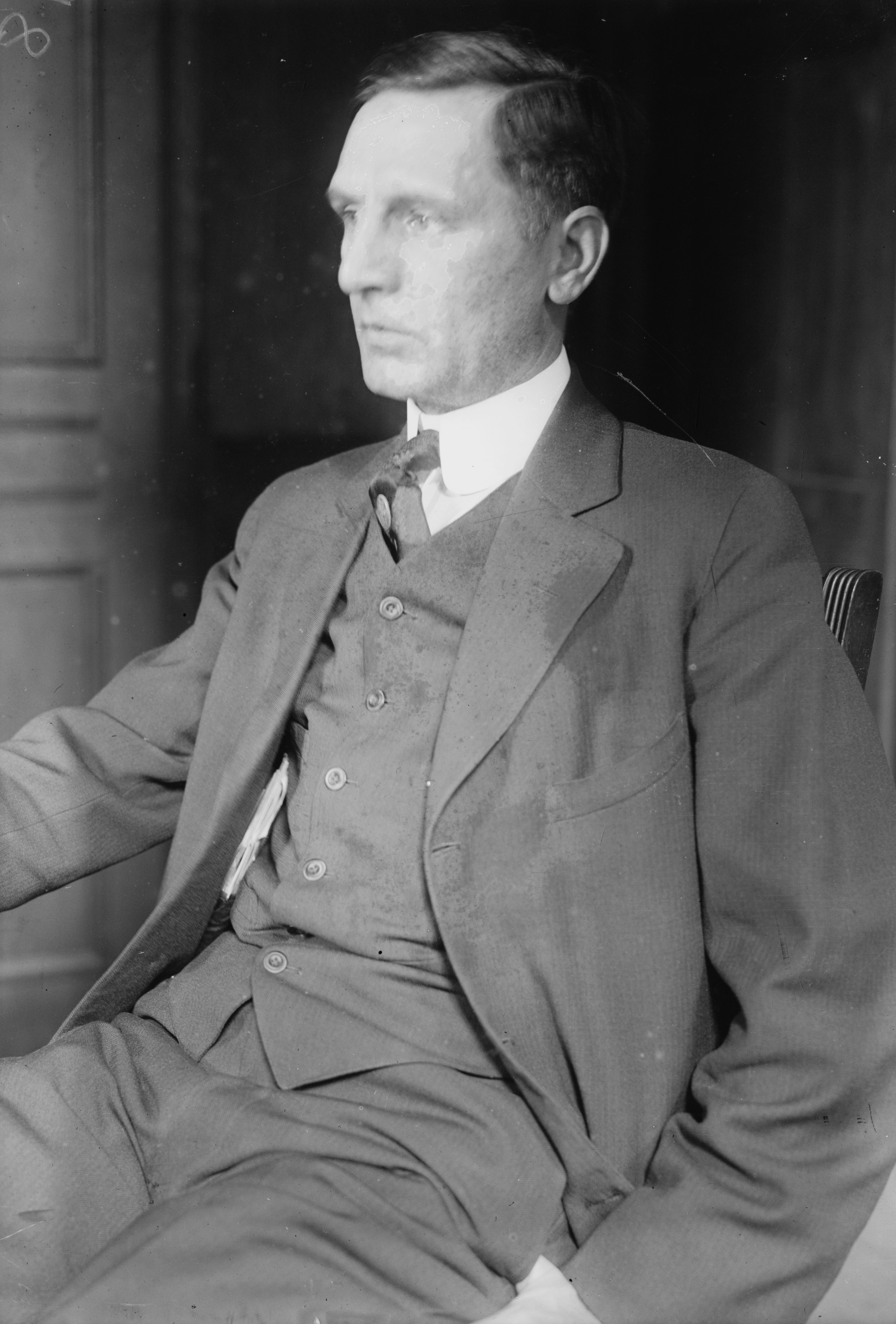
John Saxton Sumner (1915) went after Samuel Roth but wound up arresting Henry Zolinsky instead

At City College, Zolinsky was an editor of The Lavender, student poetry magazine. His circle of friends extended to other student poets and writers, including many from Columbia University like Louis Zukofsky, Whittaker Chambers, Meyer Schapiro, and Samuel Roth. He published Zukofsky in The Lavender.

In 1929, Henry Zolinsky was working for the bookstore of Samuel Roth in New York City. On October 4, 1929, John Saxton Sumner, head of the New York Society for the Suppression of Vice or "NYSVV" (chartered by the New York State Legislature), raided a warehouse of the Golden Hind Press (owned by Samuel Roth) in Wilkes-Barre, Pennsylvania. The warehouse held copies of Ulysses, Lady Chatterley's Lover, Fanny Hill, and others–at the time, all considered pornographic under current U.S. law. Legally, the NYSVV could not tie Roth to the warehouse, but they could and did tie Zolinsky and Roth's brother Max Roth, who were arrested at the warehouse (a distribution point near New York City). Zolinsky spent several months in jail. Zolinsky and another employee named Julius Moss also managed a bank account each for Samuel Roth in the name of "Richard Ross" so the Roth could hide profits.

In late 1929 or 1930, Zolinsky, his wife, and newborn daughter came to live in Lynbrook, Long Island, with Whittaker Chambers at the home of his mother, Laha Chambers.

In December 1931, Zolinsky's name appeared with those of his college friends (among them, Zukofsky and Chambers) in the famous December 1931 "Objectivist" issue of Poetry magazine.

In 1940, Zolinsky's name appears in the U.S. Census as 36 years old, living in New York City with wife Mary Jane Zolinsky (32) and daughter Nancy Zolinsky (10), and earning his living as a school teacher (as did his long-time friend Zukofsky).

== Personal and death ==
Around 1929, Zolinsky married Mary Elizabeth Nolan: they had a daughter Nancy that year.

== Awards ==
- 1926: Glascock Poetry Prize

== Works (Poetry) ==
- "Pain" in Poetry (December 1921)
- "Will Power" in Poetry (December 1921)
- "Feeling" in Poetry (December 1923)
- "Sorrow and Joy" in Poetry (December 1923)
- "Horatio" in Poetry (December 1931)

== See also ==
- Whittaker Chambers
- Louis Zukofsky
- Samuel Roth
- Meyer Schapiro
