= Samuel Roth =

American poet

- Sam Roth, right, in his book shop, Greenwich Village (1920)
- Born: 1893 "Nustscha" (now Nyshche) near Zboriv, formerly Galicia now Ukraine
- Died: July 3, 1974 (aged 80–81)
- Writing career
- Pen name: Mshillim (Hebrew name), Norman Lockridge (alias), David Zorn (alias)
- Period: 1919–1966
- Notable works: Published Lady Chatterley's Lover and Ulysses against U.S. censorship laws

Samuel Roth (1893 – July 3, 1974) was an American publisher, writer, and poet whose career was marked by literary publishing and repeated conflicts with United States obscenity laws. In the 1920s, he founded several literary magazines, including Two Worlds and Two Worlds Monthly. He published works by contemporary writers, sometimes without permission; his publication of portions of James Joyce's Ulysses led Joyce to obtain an injunction and contributed to an international protest against Roth. He later published editions of D. H. Lawrence's Lady Chatterley's Lover and other erotic literature.

Roth's publishing activities led to repeated arrests, obscenity prosecutions, and periods of imprisonment. During the 1930s he served a federal prison term at Lewisburg Federal Penitentiary, and he returned there from 1957 to 1961 following another obscenity conviction. He continued to publish under numerous imprints and through mail-order businesses, while also producing his own poetry, fiction, political writing, and works dealing with Jewish identity. Roth also publicly opposed censorship laws.

Roth's 1957 case, Roth v. United States, 354 U.S. 476 (1957), was a landmark case in which the Supreme Court of the United States redefined the constitutional test for determining what material is obscene and therefore unprotected by the First Amendment.

== Background ==
Roth was born in 1893 in Nuszcze, then Galicia, now in Ukraine into a Jewish family. His Hebrew name was "Mshilliam" (Meshulam). The family emigrated to the Lower East Side of Manhattan when he was 4 in 1897. He started working at age 8 as an egg chandler, at 10 as a newsboy, and at 14 as a baker. By the age of 16, he was working for the New York Globe as a Lower East Side correspondent. When the paper folded, Roth became homeless but continued writing and publishing and attended Columbia University for a year on scholarship.

== Career ==
=== Successes (1920s) ===
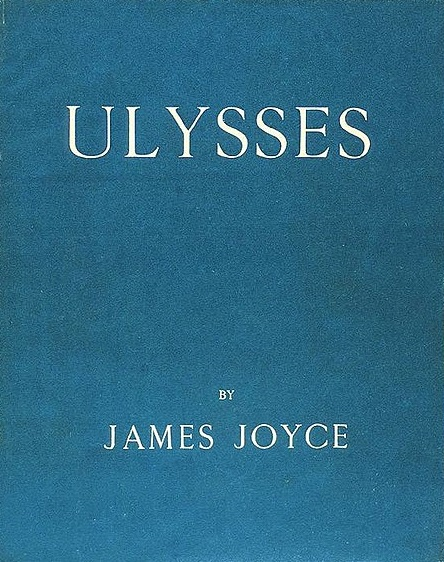
1st edition cover of James Joyce's Ulysses published by Sylvia Beach (1922)

Roth's early poetry was praised by Edwin Arlington Robinson, Louis Untermeyer, Maurice Samuel, and Ezra Pound, among others. It appeared in several respected magazines, such as The Maccabean and The Hebrew Standard, and in anthologies. His sequence of 18 sonnets, "Nustscha" (composed c. 1915–1918) is an elegy to his hometown. His "Sonnets on Sinai" in The Menorah Journal depict the speaker of the poems planning to visit Sinai in order to return the Ten Commandments to God, after they have failed to obey God's covenant.

After World War I, Roth founded a bookshop. In 1921, he traveled to London to interview European writers with the hope of selling his essays to magazines. During this time, he wrote two books on the state of the "two worlds" (Europe and America) and the situation of Jews on both continents. Europe: A Book for America (Boni & Liveright, 1919) is a lengthy, prophetic poem on the decay of Europe and the promise of America. Now and Forever (McBride, 1925) is an imaginary "conversation" between Roth and British writer Israel Zangwill on the merits of Diaspora and Zionism for the Jewish people. Zangwill praised Roth for his "poetry and pugnacity."

In the mid-1920s, with money earned by establishing a school for teaching immigrants English, Roth founded four literary magazines. These included Beau, a forerunner of Esquire and perhaps the first American "men's magazine.” The most important products in his short-lived magazine empire were the quarterly Two Worlds and Two Worlds Monthly. He chose to publish (in some cases, without permission) some sexually explicit, contemporary authors, including (in Two Worlds Monthly), segments of James Joyce's Ulysses. Joyce won an injunction to stop Roth from printing these expurgated installments. Joyce's publisher Sylvia Beach, at the writer's urging, engineered an international protest in 1927 against Roth, although the nature of copyright law at the time made the charge of piracy debatable. Due to the well-organized protest of 167 authors against him, Roth became an international literary pariah, and Random House won its case to "de-censor" Ulysses in 1934.

Roth soon after published pirated editions of Lady Chatterley's Lover, most likely the first American to do so. After a raid on his Fifth Avenue warehouse by the New York Society for the Suppression of Vice in 1929, Roth spent over a year in prison on Welfare Island, and in Philadelphia, for distributing material deemed obscene.

Written under the pressures of bankruptcy, he published Jews Must Live, a collection of autobiographical and polemical reflections about his Jewish identity, described by critics as an example of Jewish self-hatred.

=== Jail (1930s) ===
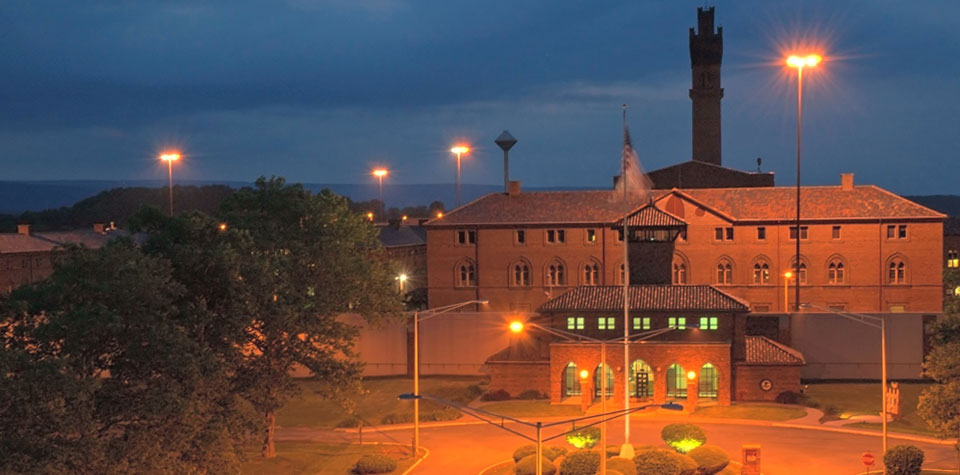
United States Lewisburg Federal Penitentiary.

Roth did well with his William Faro imprint in the early 1930s. His expurgated version of Lady Chatterley's Lover was a big seller, as were reprints of classic erotica (especially Mirbeau's Diary of a Chambermaid), from which books' explicit sex was excised. In 1931, Roth published an exposé of Herbert Hoover (The Strange Career of Mr. Hoover Under Two Flags) which sold extremely well.

However, he began to run afoul of the law as early as October 1929, when Roth, his brother Max Roth, and Henry Zolinsky (later known as Henry Zolan, an Objectivist poet who had edited The Lavender student poetry magazine at the City College of New York from 1923 to 1926) were arrested at a warehouse owned by the Golden Hind Press in Wilkes-Barre, Pennsylvania, a distribution point near New York City.

After 1933, due to a lack of money, Roth began distributing strictly banned pornography. He received illustrated books and pamphlets and sometimes left them in subway lockers for trusted customers. The FBI traced the works back to Roth, who therefore spent 1936 to 1939 in Lewisburg Federal Penitentiary. He also spent the years 1957 to 1961 there due to his conviction for distributing what was considered obscene and pandering to prurience in his advertisements.

Overall, his incarcerations included:

- 1928: 3 months in New York "workhouse" for possessing indecent materials with intent to sell
- 1929: 6 months imprisonment in "Detention Headquarters, NYC" for violation of parole: occurred after NY Society for the Suppression of Vice raided Roth's Fifth Avenue warehouse and found copies of Lady Chatterley's Lover, Ulysses, Fanny Hill, other titles and pictures
- 1930: 2 months in Moyamensing Prison, remanded after serving time in New York for selling obscene books (including Ulysses) in Philadelphia
- 1934: $100 fine (otherwise 20 days in jail)
- 1936–1939: incarceration at Lewisburg Federal Penitentiary
- 1957–1961: incarceration at Lewisburg Federal Penitentiary

There were several other cases where the charge was dismissed. In 1954, police raided the office of the Seven Sirens Press on Lafayette Street as well as Roth's apartment on the upper West Side, led by an assistant District Attorney. All books, correspondence, and furniture were removed from the office. Roth attempted to leave the apartment to make a telephone call and an altercation with a police officer occurred. After Roth promised not to sue, the case was dismissed due to vagueness of the search warrant and illegal methods of search and seizure.

=== Hiss Case connections (1940s) ===
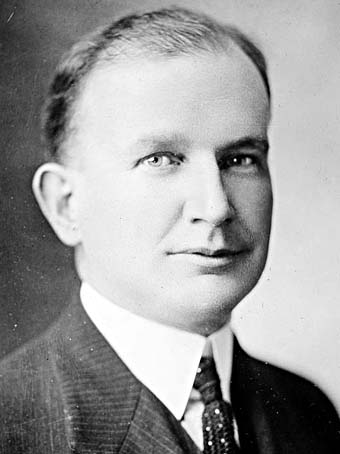
In the 1940s, Roth became involved in a book against U.S. Senator Burton K. Wheeler.

In the mid-1920s, Roth received poems by Whittaker Chambers (common friend of Henry Zolinsky and Louis Zukofsky) in his magazine Two Worlds Quarterly.

During the 1940s, Roth had David George Plotkin write a number of books for him. In 1946, Plotkin published The Plot Against America, an exposé of U.S. Senator Burton K. Wheeler. Though Roth did not publish the book, an incensed Wheeler asked the FBI to investigate, which shared Plotkin's file with the House Un-American Activities Committee (HUAC). In the process, the government made a connection between Plotkin and Roth.

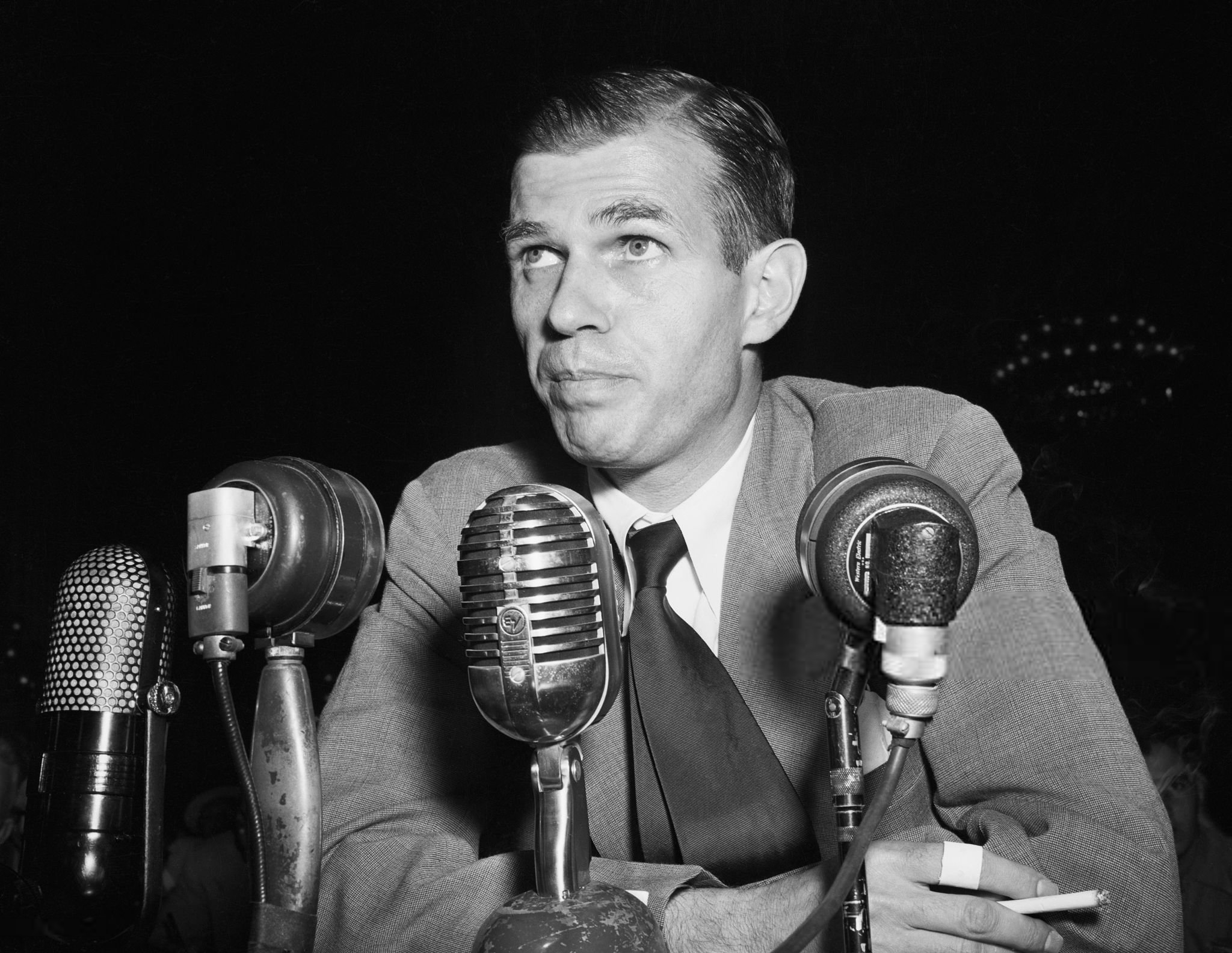
During the Hiss Case, Roth was the only person aside from Alger Hiss willing to testify before HUAC that Whittaker Chambers had used the alias "George Crosley"

In 1948, Roth wrote one of the attorneys representing Alger Hiss and offered to testify before HUAC that Whittaker Chambers had written poems for Roth during the 1920s under the alias "George Crosley"–the only person aside from Hiss himself ever willing to testify such. The Hiss defense team chose not to use Roth's deposition. (One of Roth's daughters later claimed that Roth had offered this testimony at least partly because of his "hatred for Communism and Communists.")

During United States v. Alger Hiss (1949), the Hiss defense team used "Tandaradei," an erotic poem of Chambers' that Roth had published in June 1926, to imply that Chambers was homosexual.

=== Mail order (1940s) ===
After 1940, Roth conducted most of his business via mail order. Using a combination of literary reprints, celebrity worship, criminal exploits, and political exposes, all touted as daringly salacious, he brought the Times Square entertainment carnival to every corner of America. Since the postal inspectors periodically declared "unmailable" letters to and from the business names he used, he changed those frequently. "Dame Post Office," as he referred to the Post Office Department, had to set up a special unit solely for his enterprises. By the time he re-entered Lewisburg as a result of his conviction in the 1957 case Roth v. United States, he had devised over 60 names for his "presses" or "book services." During this time, he published My Sister and I (1953), supposedly written by Friedrich Nietzsche when he was in a mental hospital near the end of his life. Another book was ghost-written by scholar of erotica Gershon Legman: The Sexual Conduct of Men and Women (1947). My Life and Loves in Greenwich Village (1955) was allegedly written by Maxwell Bodenheim, whom Roth employed during his last years. One of Roth's strangest publications was an exploitation of Marilyn Monroe's suicide, Violations of the Child Marilyn Monroe by "Her Psychiatrist Friend" (1962).

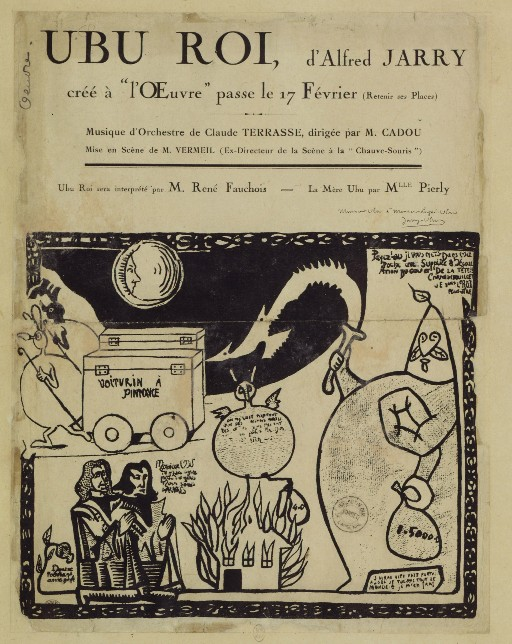
Poster for Alfred Jarry's Ubu Roi (1922)

Legman and his first wife also did a translation of Alfred Jarry's Ubu Roi, published under the title King Turd in 1953. George Sylvester Viereck's Men into Beasts (1955) was an account of his years in federal prison during World War II. Viereck was apparently a German agent. He was one of the anti-Semitic writers Roth befriended (Fritz Duquesne was another), although Roth continued to be an orthodox Jew throughout his life. Milton Hindus' fine study of Louis-Ferdinand Celine, The Crippled Giant, appeared in 1950; playwright Arthur Sainer's The Sleepwalker and the Assassin: A View of the Contemporary Theatre in 1964 (Roth continued publishing after his last stint in federal prison). Roth self-published his own works during the 1940s and 50s, including a novel about a naïve, virginal Italian immigrant discovering the plight of the working class in America, Bumarap (1947). While in prison for the last time, he wrote a fictionalized version of the ministry and crucifixion of Jesus, My Friend Yeshua (1961). The narrator, clearly a version of Roth, is given the mission of reconciling the Jewish and Christian peoples in the 20th century, a frequent theme in the 19th and earlier part of the 20th century.

=== Roth v. United States (1957) ===
Roth v. United States, 354 U.S. 476 (1957), along with its companion case Alberts v. California, was a 1957 landmark case before the United States Supreme Court, which redefined the Constitutional test for determining what constitutes obscene material unprotected by the First Amendment.

== Personal life and death ==
Roth may have been bisexual. He married Pauline Roth on May 18, 1917. They had three children together. During his career he used several aliases, including "Norman Lockridge" and "David Zorn."

Roth died age 79 on July 3, 1974, of complications from diabetes.

== Legacy ==
Roth fought censorship laws. However, because he had no money or status and because of international protest, he was ignored by established writers and outbid by wealthier, better-connected publishers (Alfred A. Knopf, Thomas Seltzer, Bennett Cerf, and Horace Liveright). Roth did not ask for permission from some of the most famous writers he published not only in his underground publications but also in his trade imprint, William Faro, Inc.

== Works ==
Books:

- Broomstick Brigade (New York: Bloch Publishing, 1914)
- "First Offering: A Book of Sonnets and Lyrics"
- Europe: A Book for America (New York: Boni and Liveright, 1919)
- Now and Forever: A Conversation with Mr. Israel Zangwill on the Jew and the Future, 1925
- Stone Walls Do Not: The Chronicle of a Captivity, 1930
- Lady Chatterley's Husbands: An Anonymous Sequel to the Celebrated Novel, Lady Chatterley's Lover (New York: William Faro, 1931)
- Lady Chatterley's Lover: A Dramatization of His Version of D.H. Lawrence's Novel (New York: William Faro, 1931)
- The Private Life of Frank Harris (New York: William Faro, 1931)
- Songs Out of Season (New York: William Faro, 1932)
- Jews Must Live: An Account of the Persecution of the World by Israel on All the Frontiers of Civilization (Illustrations by John Conrad). New York: The Golden Hind Press, Inc. 1934.
- Dear Richard: A Letter to My Son in the Fighting Forces of the United States (New York: Wisdom House, 1942)
- Peep-Hole of the Present: An Inquiry into the Substance of Appearance (New York: Philosophical Book-Club, 1945)
- Bumarap: The Story of a Male Virgin (New York: Arrowhead Books, 1947)
- Apotheosis: The Nazarene in Our World (New York: Bridgehead Books, 1957)
- My Friend Yeshua (New York: Bridgehead Books, 1961)

Editing:

- New Songs of Zion: A Zionist Anthology (New York: Judean Press, 1914)

Magazines edited:

- Two Worlds Monthly; Devoted to the Increase of the Gaiety of Nations (New York: Two Worlds Publishing, 1926-????)
- Two Worlds: A Literary Quarterly Devoted to the Increase of the Gaiety of Nations, 1925
- Good Times: A Revue of the World of Pleasure, 1954–1956

Poems edited:

- "Yahrzeit" (poem), The Nation (May 8, 1920)

Other:

- "A Letter to Mr. J. C. Squire," The Nation (November 10, 1920)

== See also ==
- Maurice Samuel - author of You Gentiles
- Marcus Eli Ravage- author of "A Real Case Against the Jews"
- A Racial Program for the Twentieth Century
- Theodore N. Kaufman - author of Germany Must Perish!
- Alger Hiss
- Whittaker Chambers
