= Maxwell Bodenheim =

American poet and novelist (1891–1954)

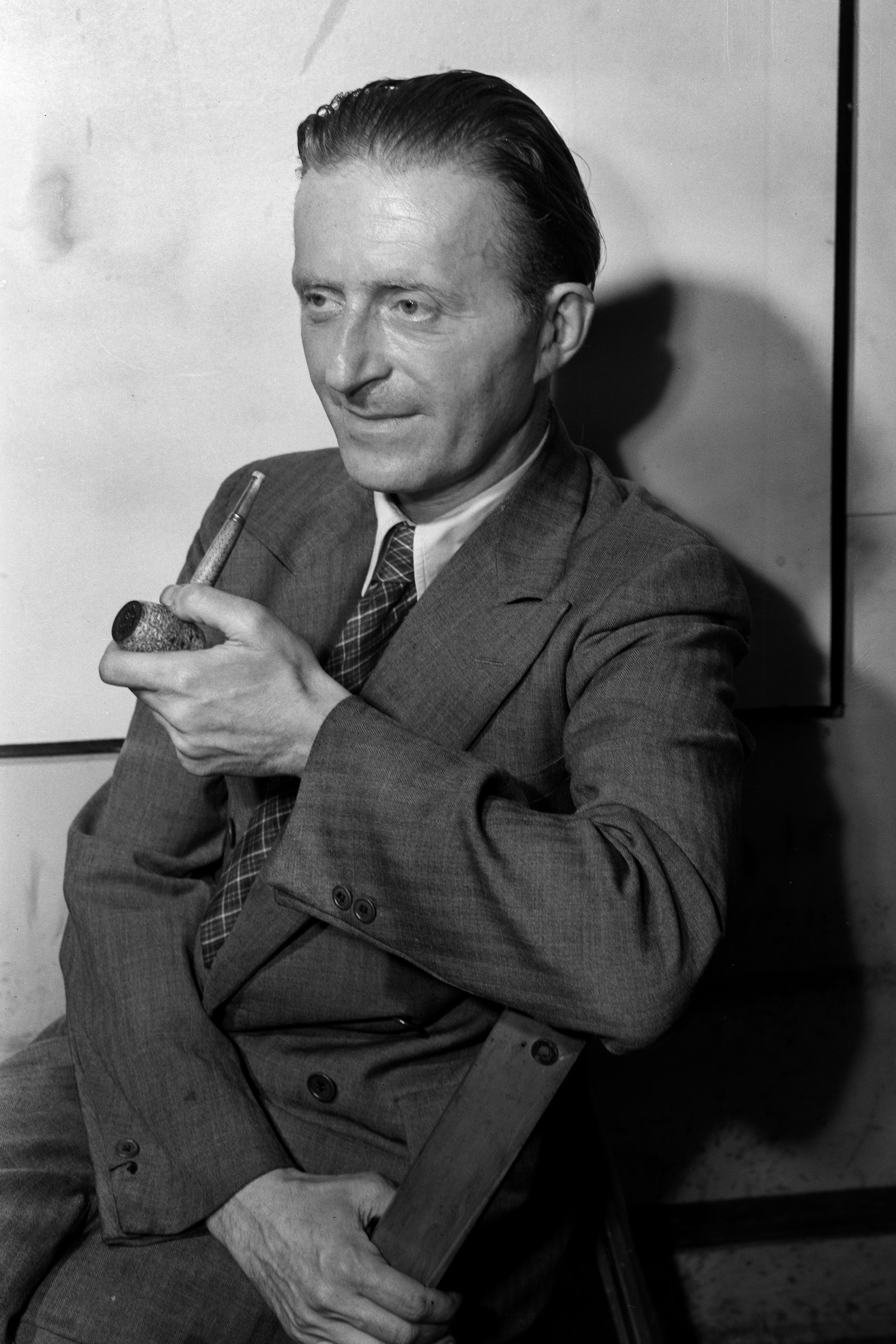
- Bodenheim c. 1942
- Born: Maxwell Bodenheimer; May 26, 1892; Hermanville, Mississippi, U.S.
- Died: February 6, 1954 (aged 61); New York City, U.S.
- Occupations: Poet, novelist
- Spouse: Minna Schein (m. 1918; div. 1938) Grace Finan (m. 1939; died 1950) Ruth Fagin (m. 1952)
- Children: 1
- Writing career
- Language: English
- Genres: Poetry, novel

Maxwell "Bogey" Bodenheim (May 26, 1892 – February 6, 1954) was an American poet and novelist. A literary figure in Chicago, he later went to New York where he became known as the King of Greenwich Village Bohemians. His writing brought him international notoriety during the Jazz Age of the 1920s.

== Early life ==
Born Maxwell Bodenheimer in Hermanville, Mississippi, he was the son of Jewish parents, Solomon Bodenheimer (born 1858) and Carrie (born 1860). His father was born in Germany and his mother in Alsace-Lorraine. Carrie emigrated to the United States in 1881 and Solomon in 1888.

In 1900, the family moved from Mississippi to Chicago, Illinois.

== Work ==
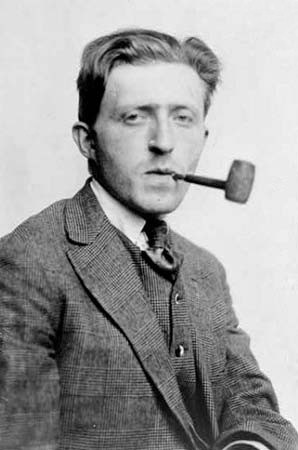
Bodenheim in 1919

In 1912, Bodenheim met Ben Hecht in Chicago and became literary friends. They co-founded The Chicago Literary Times which ran from 1923 to 1924, and had contributors including Carl Sandburg, Theodore Dreiser, Edgar Lee Masters, Witter Bynner, Arthur Davison Ficke, Floyd Dell, Vachel Lindsay and Sherwood Anderson. At the time, Bodenheim was nicknamed "Bogey." The nickname was also applied in his later years in Greenwich Village.

Bodenheim was a co-founder, alongside sculptor and dancer Lou Wall Moore, of “The Shop,” a bohemian social club in Chicago.

Bodenheim published his earliest verse in the groundbreaking Poetry magazine in 1914. A poem by Bodenheim was featured in the 1917 Others: An Anthology of the New Verse, which included poems by such future luminaries as T. S. Eliot, Marianne Moore, Carl Sandburg, William Carlos Williams, and Wallace Stevens. While the poet was living in New York City, he became an active member of the Raven Poetry Circle of Greenwich Village.

Over the next ten years, he established himself as a leading American author, publishing ten books of verse, which incorporate many techniques of the imagists, and 13 novels. His poetry books include Minna and Myself (1918), Advice (1920), Against This Age (1923), The King of Spain (1928), Bringing Jazz! (1930) and Selected Poems 1914–1944 (1946).

Bodenheim's novels include Blackguard (1923), Replenishing Jessica (1925), Ninth Avenue (1926), Georgia May (1927), Naked on Roller Skates (1930) and A Virtuous Girl (1930). His 1933 novel New York Madness was reissued in 2024 by Tough Poets Press.

Critic John Strausbaugh suggests that Bodenheim had "a real talent for scandal, easy enough to generate during Greenwich Village's prolonged drunken orgy in the Prohibition years." Strausbaugh notes that Bodenheim's "haughty, insulting demeanor, and his habit of trying to steal other men's women right under their noses, got him regularly socked on the jaw and thrown out of bars, soirees and the fauxhemian revels at Webster Hall." For many years a leading figure of the Bohemian scene in New York's Greenwich Village, Bodenheim deteriorated rapidly after his success in the 1920s and 1930s.

== Personal life and death ==
=== Marriages ===
Bodenheim had three marriages. His first wife was Minna Schein whom he married in 1918. The couple had one son, Solbert, born in 1920. They divorced in 1938.

His second wife was Grace Finan, whom he married in 1939. Finan died of cancer in 1950. After becoming a widower, he married Ruth Fagin in 1952.

Before he married his second wife, Grace, he had become a panhandler. They spent part of their marriage in the Catskills. After her death in 1950, he was arrested and hospitalized several times for vagrancy and drunkenness.

"Death"

I shall walk down the road.
I shall turn and feel upon my feet
The kisses of Death, like scented rain.
For Death is a black slave with little silver birds
Perched in a sleeping wreath upon his head.
He will tell me, his voice like jewels
Dropped into a satin bag,
How he has tip-toed after me down the road,
His heart made a dark whirlpool with longing for me.
Then he will graze me with his hands
And I will be one of the sleeping silver birds
Between the cold waves of his hair, as he tip-toes on.

Ruth Fagin, 28 years his junior, shared his derelict lifestyle. They were homeless and slept on park benches. He sometimes panhandled while carrying a sign that read, "I Am Blind," although he had adequate vision. He sometimes composed short poems for money or drinks. Ruth engaged in prostitution, which reportedly provoked beatings by her husband. In approximately 1953, Bodenheim and Ruth spent some time (perhaps two months) as guests of the Catholic Worker of Dorothy Day in New York. Day had been a friend of Bodenheim in Greenwich Village in the 1920s. She devoted a chapter to the Bodenheims in her Loaves and Fishes (1963).

=== Death ===
Bodenheim and Ruth were murdered on February 6, 1954, at a flophouse at 97 Third Avenue in Manhattan, by a 25-year-old dishwasher, Harold "Charlie" Weinberg. They had befriended him on the streets of the Village and he offered to let them spend the night in his room a few blocks from the Bowery.

Weinberg and Ruth had sex near the cot where the drunken Bodenheim appeared to be sleeping. Bodenheim then arose, challenged Weinberg, and they began fighting. Weinberg shot Bodenheim twice in the chest. He then beat Ruth and stabbed her four times in the back.

Weinberg confessed to the double homicide, but said in his defense, "I ought to get a medal. I killed two Communists." Weinberg was judged insane (sociopathic) and sent to a mental institution.

Hecht offered to pay for Bodenheim's funeral. Bodenheim's ex-wife, Minna Schein, made arrangements to have him buried in her family plot in Cedar Park Cemetery, Emerson, New Jersey.

== Legacy ==
- Bodenheim's memoir, My Life and Loves in Greenwich Village, released six months after his death in 1954, was largely ghostwritten by David George Plotkin, a writer employed by the publisher Samuel Roth. Roth had been paying the down-and-out Bodenheim for his biographical stories about Greenwich Village at the time of the writer's murder.
- Hecht based his 1958 play Winkelberg on the life of the bohemian poet.
- Three official full biographies have been published on Maxwell Bodenheim: a doctoral dissertation by Edward T. Devoe, A Soul in Gaudy Tatters, University of Pennsylvania (1957); Maxwell Bodenheim (1970) by Jack B. Moore; and a doctoral dissertation, The Necessity of Rebellion: The Novels of Maxwell Bodenheim (1975) by Arthur B. Sacks, University of Wisconsin-Madison.
- A substantial collection of his journalism was published in 2024 by Tough Poets Press under the title Bughouse Dope: Selected Essays & Articles, edited and with an introduction by Paul Maher Jr.

== Bibliography ==
=== Fiction ===
Novels

- Blackguard, 1923
- Crazy Man, 1924
- Replenishing Jessica, 1925
- Ninth Avenue, 1926
- Georgie May, 1928
- Sixty Seconds, 1929
- Naked on Roller Skates, 1930
- A Virtuous Girl, 1930
- Duke Herring, 1931
- Run, Sheep, Run, 1932
- Six A.M., 1932
- New York Madness, 1933
- Slow Vision, 1933

Novellas

- Hecht, Ben & Bodenheim, Maxwell (1924). Cutie : a warm mamma. Chicago: The Hechtshaw Press.

=== Poetry ===
Collections

- Minna and Myself, 1918
- Advice, 1920
- Introducing Irony, 1922
- Against This Age, 1923
- The Sardonic Arm, 1923
- Returning to Emotion, 1927
- The King of Spain, 1928
- Bringing Jazz!, 1930
- Lights in the Valley, 1942
- Selected Poems, 1946

=== Nonfiction and memoirs ===
- My Life and Loves in Greenwich Village, 1954
- Bughouse Dope: Selected Essays & Articles, 2024

=== Essays and reporting ===
- Bodenheim, Maxwell (January 2, 1926). "For 100% censorship". The New Yorker. 1 (46): 16.
