= List of Glascock Prize winners and participants =

The Glascock Poetry Prize is awarded to the winner of the invitation only Kathryn Irene Glascock Intercollegiate Poetry Contest at Mount Holyoke College.

== 1993 - present ==
2026 (103rd):

- Winner: Nessa Joan from Brooklyn College
- Kiara Korten from University of Connecticut
- tess Nelson from Bard Microcollege Holyoke
- Amelia Potter from Mount Holyoke College
- Reem Thakur from Tufts University
- María Vielma-Baxter from Hampshire College

2025 (102nd):

- Winner: A.T. Rhodes from Spelman College
- Winner: Ria deGuzman from Smith College
- Charlie Watts from Mount Holyoke College
- Izzy Toy Rettke from Wellesley College
- Elani Spencer from Hollins University
- Miley Lu 卢兆东 from Vassar College

2024 (101st):

- Winner: Brittni Braswell from Brown University
- Runner-up: Aderet Fishbane from Mount Holyoke College
- Riley Bowen from University of Massachusetts Amherst
- Sambhavi Dwivedi from Rutgers University
- Erin Grier from Spelman College
- Eva Lynch from McGill University

2023 (100th):

- Winner: Thomas Bosworth from Dartmouth College
- Winner: Portlyn Houghton-Harjo from Pratt Institute
- Ace Chandler from Mount Holyoke College
- Elizabeth Roa Martinez from University of Massachusetts Boston
- Mason Ryan Newbury from Suffolk University
- Jordan Trice from Amherst College

2022 (99th):

- Winner: Clare O'Gara from Smith College
- Kate Blakley from University of New Hampshire
- Liza Marsala from Massachusetts College of Liberal Arts
- Jocelyn Maeyama from Wesleyan University
- Imani Ross from Howard University
- Darwin Michener-Rutledge from Mount Holyoke College

2021 (98th):

- Winner: Tovah Strong from Institute of American Indian Arts
- Alejandra Cabezas from Mount Holyoke College
- Julia Kudler from University of Washington at Seattle
- Meredith Luchs from Hampshire College
- Felicia Payomo from Mills College
- Wafa Shaikh from Houston Community College

2020 (97th):

- Winner: Marissa Perez from Holyoke Community College
- 2nd Place: Luciana Arbus-Scandiffio from Bennington College
- Natalie Bavar from University of Massachusetts Amherst
- American Xavier Gaylord from College of the Holy Cross
- Maren McKenna from Mount Holyoke College
- Samiha Swarup from University of Toronto

2019 (96th):

- Winner: Dur-e-Maknoon Ahmed from Mount Holyoke College
- Winner: Sarah Terrazano from Brandeis University
- Vilhelm (Billy) Anderson Woltz from Massachusetts Institute of Technology
- Ariana Benson from Spelman College
- Julia Falkner from Smith College
- John Krug from The New School

2018 (95th):

- Winner: Linda Zhang from Mount Holyoke College
- Michelle Chen from University of Massachusetts Amherst
- Jordan Jace from Williams College
- Noelle Powers from University of Tennessee at Chattanooga
- Kyra Spence from Barnard College
- Grayson Wolf from Hunter College

2017 (94th):

- Winner: Anisha Pai from Mount Holyoke College
- 2nd Place: Natalia Rodriquez from City College of New York
- Kwamesha Joseph from Fordham University
- Emily Robidoux from Smith College
- Malini Ghandi from Yale University

2016 (93rd):

- Winner: Zoë Bodzas from Hamilton College
- 2nd Place: Peter LaBerge from University of Pennsylvania
- Angela Nelson from University of Rhode Island
- James O'Connell from Emerson College
- Rachel Schmieder-Gropen from Mount Holyoke College
- Nina Shallman from Amherst College

2015 (92nd):

- Winners: Nisha Jain from Cornell University and Julian Parikh from Boston University
- 2nd place: Taylor Marks from Smith College
- Katherine Gibbel from Wesleyan University
- Emma Ginader from Mount Holyoke College
- Rose Laurano from Rutgers University

2014 (91st):

- Winner: Rebecca Liu from Columbia University
- 2nd place: Milo Muise from Hampshire College
- Ryan Kim from Middlebury College
- Anthea Hubanks from Mount Holyoke College
- Robert Allen Parry from University of Southern Maine
- Elizabeth Rowland from Vassar College

2013 (90th):

- Winner: Jamie Samdahl from Smith College
- 2nd place: Laura Naparstek from Skidmore College
- Lauren Abbate from Mount Holyoke College
- Salma Elmehdawi from Fordham University
- Paige Melin from University at Buffalo
- Warner James Wood from Harvard University

2012 (89th):

- Winner: Garon Scott from University of Connecticut
- 2nd place: Katherine Kinkel from Bowdoin College
- Layli Amerson from Mount Holyoke College
- Andrew Bustria from Sarah Lawrence College
- Brian Folan from University of Massachusetts, Amherst
- Jessica Yoo from Johns Hopkins University

2011 (88th):

- Winner: Kit Schluter from Bard College
- 2nd place: Melissa Yang from Mount Holyoke College
- Frances Cannon from University of Vermont
- Emily A. Lee from Trinity College
- Christopher Spaide from Amherst College
- April Walker from Emory University

2010 (87th):

- Winner: Nicole Gervasio from Bryn Mawr College
- 2nd place: Naomi Sosner from Dartmouth College and Nisa Williams from University of Maryland
- Caroline Georges from Hampshire College
- Anya Johnson from Syracuse University
- Bianca Young from Mount Holyoke College

2009 (86th):

- Winner: Emily Yates from Mount Holyoke College
- 2nd Place: Georgia Pearle from Smith College
- Miriam Callahan from American University
- Sarah Brenner from Bennington College
- Kelly Forsythe from University of Pittsburgh
- Elisa Gonzalez from Yale University

2008 (85th):

- Winner: Alexandra Zelman-Döring from Brown University
- 2nd place: Sarah Binns from Mount Holyoke College
- Laura Burns from Bates College
- Dan Esposito from Boston College
- William Hough from University of Massachusetts Amherst
- Tina Ganguly from Stony Brook University

2007 (84th):

- Winners: Sarah Twombly from Mount Holyoke College and Emma Gorenberg from Amherst College
- Deborah Beth Medows from Brandeis University
- Mark Parlette from College of William & Mary
- Philip Matthews from Temple University
- Noel Tague from University of New Hampshire

2006 (83rd):

- Winner: Jessica Spradling from Dartmouth College
- 2nd Place: Sarah Giragosian from Mount Holyoke College
- Ashley Williard from Hampshire College
- Rachael Hudak from the University of Michigan
- Sam Donsky from the University of Pennsylvania
- Kate Broad from Wellesley College

2005 (82nd):

- Winner: Carolyn Creedon from Smith College
- Nancy Doherty from Mount Holyoke College
- Dan Joseph from Boston University
- Alan King from Howard University
- Ian Segal from Princeton University
- Anna Torres from Swarthmore College

2004 (81st):

- Winners: Davey Volner from Columbia University and Kristina Martino from UMass Amherst
- Rachel Kahn from Mount Holyoke College
- Ariele le Grand from Spelman College
- Heather Maki from Williams College
- Sokunthary Svay from the City College of New York

2003 (80th):

- Winner: Rachel Gainer from George Washington University
- 2nd Place: Billy Lopez from Amherst College
- Geoffrey C. Babbitt from Connecticut College
- Olivia Bustion from Mount Holyoke College
- Arnold Seong from Cornell University
- David Willis from Haverford College

2002 (79th):

- Winner: Keayr Braxton from Vassar College
- 2nd place: Katharine Sapper from Mount Holyoke College
- Susan Ellsworth from Colby College
- Justine Post from Hampshire College
- Sumitra Ratneshwar from University of Connecticut
- Daniel Sack from Brandeis University

2001 (78th):

- Winner: Emma Christensen from Bryn Mawr College
- 2nd place: Meghan Tally from Emory University
- Erica Dawson from Johns Hopkins University
- Kathryn Foran from Mount Holyoke College
- Joshua Friedman from Amherst College
- Kimberley Rogers from Smith College

2000 (77th):

- Winner: Anna Ziegler from Yale University
- 2nd Place: Diane Rainson from Mount Holyoke College
- Roseanne (Rosebud) Lane from New York University
- Chris Martin from Carleton College
- Alicia Potee from Saint John's College
- Elizabeth Werner from Hampshire College

1999 (76th):

- Winner: Erika W. Dyson from Mount Holyoke College
- 2nd place: Elspeth Healey from Brown University
- David Jones from George Washington University
- Lily Roberts from Skidmore College
- Elysabeth (Abe Louise) Young from Smith College
- Anthony Brandt Zipp from Johns Hopkins University

1998 (75th):

- Winner: Deirdre Lockwood from Amherst College
- 2nd place: Joshua Carter from Bard College
- Alicia Rabins from Barnard College
- Katie Sigelman from Harvard University
- Yasotha Sriharan from Mount Holyoke College
- Amanda Williams from University of North Carolina

1997 (74th):

- Winners: Stephanie Saldana from Middlebury College and Amy Thomas from Dartmouth College
- Tamar Stratyevskaya from Mount Holyoke College
- Nuy Y. Cho from Barnard College
- Tyler Maas from Hampshire College
- Sara Perry from Massachusetts Institute of Technology

1996 (73rd):

- Winner: Christine Bauch from Vassar College
- 2nd Place: Michael Donohue from Princeton University
- Sam Cherubin from University of Massachusetts
- Andrea Deese from Swarthmore College
- Jared Hickman from Bowdoin College
- Judi Ward from Mount Holyoke College

1995 (72nd):

- Winner: Jardine Libaire from Skidmore College
- 2nd place: Bess Huddle from Middlebury College
- 3rd place: Jennifer Lowe from Mount Holyoke College
- Andrea Brady from Columbia University
- Megan Gilbert from Boston University
- Victoria Pearson from Smith College

1994 (71st):

- Winner: Rebecca Horwitt from Tufts University
- 2nd place: Vikki Merton from Mount Holyoke College
- 3rd place: Jessica Harris from Pennsylvania State University
- Rachel Jones from Williams College
- Josephine Park from Amherst College
- Mika Shino from New York University

1993 (70th)

- Winner: Oliver Jones from Hampshire College
- 2nd place: Brooke Belcher from Bates College and Melanie Rehak from University of Pennsylvania
- Vikki Merton from Mount Holyoke College
- C.B. Bernard from Saint Michael's College
- Margaret M. Nelson (Maggie Nelson) from Wesleyan University

== Past winners and participants ==
1992:

- Winner: Gia Hansbury from Bryn Mawr College
- 2nd place: Jennifer Wilder from Yale University
- Garrett Doherty from University of Massachusetts
- Amy Glynn from Mount Holyoke College
- Maximillian Heinegg from Union College
- Alonzo Patterson from Lincoln University

1991:

- Winner: Mara Scanlon from University of Virginia
- 2nd place: Norma Laurenzi from Wellesley College
- Robert Bradley from Stony Brook University
- Ken Cormier from University of Connecticut
- Nancy L. Richard from Mount Holyoke College
- Janet Walker from Boston College

1990:

- Winner: Steven Johnson from Brown University
- 2nd place: Maria Elena Robb from Cornell University
- Kerry Sarnoski from Smith College
- Jennifer Hollingsworth from Hollins University
- Gerard LaFemina from Sarah Lawrence College
- Michelle Lodjic from Mount Holyoke College

1989:

- Winner: Chris McEntee from St. Michael's College
- 2nd place: Richard Hatchett from Vanderbilt University
- Jennifer Call from Harvard University
- William Fisher from Amherst College
- Alex Sela from University at Albany, SUNY
- Anna Sibley from Mount Holyoke College

1988:

- Winner: Larissa Szporluk from University of Michigan
- 2nd place: Bruce Baker from Skidmore College
- Rosemary Gould from Dartmouth College
- Andrea Werblin from University of Massachusetts
- Beth Cross from Saint John's College
- Julia Watson from Mount Holyoke College

1987:

- Winner: Whedbee Mullen from Princeton University
- 2nd place: Jerry Smith from Hampshire College
- Greg Wilson from Emory University
- Mike Wood from University of Rhode Island
- Eric Arehart from Bennington College
- Anna Sibley from Mount Holyoke College

1986:

- Winners: Ralph Savarese from Wesleyan University and Nancy Burns from Vassar College
- Sean Reardon from University of Notre Dame
- Susan Bartfay from Greenfield Community College
- Louise A. Wareham from Columbia University
- Elizabeth Palermo from Mount Holyoke College

1985:

- Winner: Susan Lasher from Yale University
- 2nd place: Margaret L. Anderson from Mount Holyoke College
- Bruce Hainley from College of William & Mary
- Ruth Maus from Smith College
- J.D. Smith from American University
- Jonathan Wahl from Boston University

1984:

- Winner: Ellen Spring from University of Vermont
- 2nd place: Nina Solomon from Barnard College
- 3rd place: Fernando Hernandez from Brooklyn College
- Darrell Donnell Darrisaw from Morris Brown College
- David Matson from Bates College
- Betty Ellen Walter from Mount Holyoke College

1983:

- Winners: Michele McMahon from New York University and Anna Peterson from Williams College
- Anne Myles from Bryn Mawr College
- Alice Sebold from Syracuse University
- Theresa M. Yuhas from Mount Holyoke College

1982:

- Winner: Terry Hayes from Brooklyn College
- 2nd place: Robert Lord Keyes from University of Massachusetts and Mark Labdon from Colby College
- Marc Cote from McGill University
- Glenn Pearl from Union College
- Valerie Tratnyek from Mount Holyoke College

1981:

- Winner: Amy Boesky from Harvard University
- 2nd place: Elizabeth A. Cole from Swarthmore College
- Helen Bartlett from Trinity College
- Monique V. Chireau from Mount Holyoke College
- Jeffrey Kennell from University at Albany, SUNY
- Meredith Randall from Amherst College

1980:

- Winner: Ginny Eliason from University of New Hampshire
- 2nd place: Lynn Behrendt from Bard College and Emily S. Silverman from Mount Holyoke College
- Judith Bloch from Hunter College
- Hugh Blumenfeld from Massachusetts Institute of Technology
- Pindie Stephen from Cornell University

1979:

- Winner: Ellen Gray from University of Connecticut
- 2nd place: Lisa Hagen from Sweet Briar College and Patricia Rettew from Wellesley College
- Wayne Burke from Goddard College
- Thor Ronay from Boston College
- Catherine E. Whitehead from Mount Holyoke College

1978:

- Winner: Katherine Jane Gill from Mount Holyoke College
- 2nd place: James Clark from Boston University
- Lynn Bershak from Douglass College
- Tom Callaghan from Vassar College
- Nancy Chatfield from Smith College
- Jeremiah Cronin from Connecticut College

1977:

- Winner: Alfred Nicol from Dartmouth College
- Jennifer Arndt from Princeton University
- Steven Gutherz from Tufts University
- Janice L. Kelemen from Mount Holyoke College
- Kate Llewellyn from University of Pennsylvania
- Steven White from Williams College

1976:

- Winner: Devon Miller from Mount Holyoke College
- 2nd place: Mary Jo Salter from Radcliffe College - Harvard University and Scott Haas from Hampshire College
- Michael Gizzi from Brown University
- John Latta from Cornell University
- Cynthia Medalie from Sarah Lawrence College

1975:

- Winner: Russell Sehnert from Colby College
- 2nd place: Dean Holmes from Wesleyan University and Robert Lloyd from University of New Hampshire
- Linda J. Corrente from Mount Holyoke College
- George-Therese Dickenson from Wellesley College
- Kathy Sue Orr from Sweet Briar College

1974:

- Winner: Gjertrud Schnackenberg from Mount Holyoke College
- Robert Cava from Massachusetts Institute of Technology
- Rika Lesser from Yale University
- Kathleen Sawyer from University of Massachusetts
- William Vassilopoulos from Manchester Community College
- Ellen Weinberg from Goucher College

1973:

- Winner: Gjertrud Schnackenberg from Mount Holyoke College
- 2nd place: Ann Peterson from Smith College and Roberta Alan Rosenberg from Harvard University
- Paul G. Grimes from Yale University
- Nini McCabe from Bennington College
- Thomas Skove Jr. from Amherst College

1972:

- Winner: Frances Padorr from Barnard College
- 2nd place: David Cloutier from Brown University
- Roger Conover from Bowdoin College
- Lynn Christiane Jacox from Mount Holyoke College
- Muffy Seigel from Swarthmore College
- Gretchen Wolff from Bryn Mawr College

1971:

- Winner: James Richardson from Princeton University
- 2nd place: Lynn Christiane Jacox from Mount Holyoke College
- Susanne K. Fickert from Smith College
- Allen Foresta from Cornell University
- Mark Fowler from Brandeis University
- Timothy Sammons from Massachusetts Institute of Technology

1970:

- Winners: Cassia Berman from Sarah Lawrence College and Katha Pollitt from Radcliffe College
- Harry Allan George from Bowdoin College
- John J. Heagney from Lock Haven University of Pennsylvania
- Peter M. Kaldheim from Dartmouth College
- Eloise F. White from Mount Holyoke College

1969:

- Winner: Bruce Dvorchik from University of Connecticut
- 2nd place: David Lehman from Columbia University and Kathleen Anne Norris from Bennington College
- Ellen Anthony from Vassar College
- Ann Schulte from Mount Holyoke College
- Jeffrey Wohkittel from Wesleyan University

1968:

- Winner: Barry Seiler from Queens College
- 2nd place: Maeve Kinkead from Radcliffe College and James L. Price from Dartmouth College
- David A. Lupher from Yale University
- Patricia Ann Roth from Mount Holyoke College
- Lillie Kate Walker from Spelman College

1967:

- Winner: John Koethe from Princeton University
- 2nd place: David J. Shapiro from Columbia University
- Joan Dimow from Connecticut College
- Cheryl Ann Lawson from Wellesley College
- William Mullen from Harvard University
- Ann Schulte from Mount Holyoke College

1966:

- Winner: Michael B. Wolfe from Wesleyan University
- 2nd place: Ellin Sarot from Barnard College and Thomas Walsh from Yale University
- David Glass from Tufts University
- Sheryl A. Owens from Mount Holyoke College
- Tom Parson from Yale University
- Elisabeth Young from Sarah Lawrence College

1965:

- Winner: Roberta Elzey from Bennington College
- 2nd place: Anne D. Cleaves from Mount Holyoke College and Margaret Edwards from Bryn Mawr College
- David Beckman from Brown University
- Richard Deutch from Bard College
- Gerald Meyers from Harvard University

1964:

- Winner: Mary Ann Radner from Wellesley College
- Patricia Arnold from Connecticut College
- Martha W. George from Mount Holyoke College
- William Hunt from Wesleyan University
- Edward Kissam from Princeton University
- Steven Orlen from University of Massachusetts

1963:

- Winner: Alarik W. Skarstrom from Tufts University
- 2nd place: Helen Pringle from Mount Holyoke College
- Steven Ablon from Amherst College
- Mary Lynn Davis from Vassar College
- Sam K. Davis from Wesleyan University
- Mary-Kay Gamel from Smith College
- Gerard Malanga from Wagner College

1962:

- Winner: Ellen Y. Sutherland from Mount Holyoke College
- 2nd place: Laura Kirchman from Sarah Lawrence College
- Edward B. Freeman from Yale University
- Judith Gerber from Barnard College
- R. Edwin Jarman from Williams College
- David Lander from Trinity College

1961:

- Winner: Margaret Hambrecht from Wellesley College
- 2nd place: Norman D. D’Arthenay from Wesleyan University
- John C. Holden from Harvard University
- Jacqueline Klein from Bennington College
- Barbara L. Morgan from Mount Holyoke College
- Bruce Wilder from Tufts University

1960:

- Winner: Mark W. Halperin from Bard College
- 2nd place: Miriam M. Reik from Sarah Lawrence College
- Charles J. Doria from Western Reserve
- John Harbison from Harvard University
- Sandra M. Iger from Mount Holyoke College
- Alexander Lattimore from Dartmouth College
- Iris Tillman from Smith College

1959:

- Winner: G. Jon Roush from Amherst College
- Carole Battista from Connecticut College
- Katherine Greene from Vassar College
- Alfred M. Lee from Yale University
- Peter Livingston from Tufts University
- Augustus Y. Napier from Wesleyan University
- Moira E. Thompson from Mount Holyoke College

1958:

- Winner: Janet Burroway from Barnard College
- 2nd place: Michael M. Fried from Princeton University
- Jill Hoffman from Bennington College
- Peter Livingston from Tufts University
- Lynne S. Mayo from Mount Holyoke College
- Peter Parsons from Yale University
- Remington Rose from Trinity College

1957

- Winner: Robert Ely Bagg from Amherst College
- 2nd place: Michael M. Fried from Princeton University
- Terry Brook from Sarah Lawrence College
- Constance Horton from Bryn Mawr College
- Lynne Lawner from Wellesley College
- F.L. Seidel from Harvard University

1956:

- Winner: Harold James Wilson from Williams College
- 2nd place: Helen M. O’Brien from Mount Holyoke College
- Weir Burke from Connecticut College
- Jan Donald Curran from University of Vermont
- Lorna Regolsky from University of Massachusetts
- David R. Slavitt from Yale University

1955:

- Winners: Sylvia Plath from Smith College and William Key Whitman from Wesleyan University
- Lynne Lawner from Wellesley College
- Donald Lehmkuhl from Columbia University
- Jean Ann Piser from Mount Holyoke College
- David Rattray from Dartmouth College

1954:

- Winner: Margaret Tongue from Vassar College
- Jerome A. Barron from Tufts University
- Dorothy E. Fuller from Mount Holyoke College
- Pete Goldman from Williams College
- Walter Kaiser from Harvard University
- William Velton from Amherst College

1953:

- Winner: Richard C. Sewell from Bard College
- David N. Keightley from Amherst College
- Pauline Miller Leet from Boston University
- Mary Anne Muller from Mount Holyoke College
- Marnie Pomeroy from Sarah Lawrence College
- J. N. Smith from Haverford College

1952:

- Winner: George Garrett from Princeton University
- Jack Brownfield from Hamilton College
- Ann Hyde from Wheaton College
- George A. Kelly from Harvard University
- William McGrath from University of Massachusetts
- Mary Anne Muller from Mount Holyoke College

1951:

- Winner: Robert Colleen from Tufts University
- 2nd place: Donald Hall from Harvard University
- Robert LaGuardia from Columbia University
- Lora S. Levy from Brandeis University
- Alexandra Tschacbasoff from Bennington College
- E. Jane Williams from Mount Holyoke College

1950:

- Winner: Edward Collins Bogardus from Yale University
- Janet A. Emig from Mount Holyoke College
- Maureen Kearns from Smith College
- Roger Simmons from Dartmouth College
- Raymond Smith from Williams College
- Linda Weinberg from Vassar College

1949:

- Winner: William Burford from Amherst College
- Marianne Halley from Wellesley College
- Sidney Michaels from Tufts University
- Louis Edward Sissman from Harvard University
- Peggy Talbott from Sarah Lawrence College
- Evelyn M. West from Mount Holyoke College

1948:

- Winner: Kenneth Koch from Harvard University and Sidney Michaels from Tufts University
- Diana Chang from Barnard College
- George William Green from College of the Holy Cross
- Marion Elizabeth Orr from Wellesley College
- Rosamond Rauch from Mount Holyoke College

1947:

- Winner: Frederick Buechner from Princeton University
- 2nd place: Phoebe Pierce from Bennington College
- Arline Appelbaum from Swarthmore College
- Jane Armstrong from Mount Holyoke College
- Charles Burkhart from Cornell University
- Judith Nelson from Radcliffe College
- Laurence Silberstein from Dartmouth College

1946:

- Winner: James Merrill from Amherst College
- 2nd place: Miriam H. Truesdell from Mount Holyoke College
- M. David Bell from Brown University
- William Robert Fague from Wesleyan University
- S.A. Lieber from Williams College
- Roger Shattuck from Yale University
- Medeline Sherman from Smith College
- Sylvia Stallings from Bryn Mawr College

1945:

- Winner: John Senior from Columbia University
- Lucy Grey Black from Wheaton College
- William Robert Fague from Wesleyan University
- Reuben Hersh from Harvard University
- Alice Johnson from Boston University
- Mary McCullough from Mount Holyoke College

1944:

- Winner: John Vournakes from Tufts University
- Elizabeth E. Converse from Mount Holyoke College
- Edward Kuhn from Dartmouth College
- Ralph Nash from Duke University
- Jacqueline Steiner from Vassar College
- Selden Thomas from Middlebury College
- Ruth Whitman from Radcliffe College

1943:

- Winner: Sven Magnus Armens from Tufts University
- Elysabeth Barbour from Sarah Lawrence College
- William Francis from Amherst College
- Anthony Evan Hecht from Bard College
- Marion J. Kingston from Mount Holyoke College
- William Manchester from University of Massachusetts

1942:

- Winner: William Sellers from Boston University
- Thomas Barbour from Princeton University
- Josephine L. Doughton from Mount Holyoke College
- George McDonough from Middlebury College
- Blythe Morley from Vassar College

1941:

- Winner: Cedric Whitman from Harvard University
- Carl Carlson from Wesleyan University
- Cynthia Coggan from Smith College
- William Kunstler from Yale University
- Lois E. Neupert from Mount Holyoke College
- Jean Nevius from Wheaton College

1940:

- Winner: George Zabriskie from Duke University
- Frank Donaldson Brown from Williams College
- Edward McDonel Fritz from Dartmouth College
- Anne Grosvenor from Vassar College
- Maxine West from Pennsylvania State University
- Anne L. Wonders from Mount Holyoke College

1939:

- Winners: Elinor J. Bowker from Mount Holyoke College and Howard Houston from Cornell University
- John Chamberlain from Princeton University
- Clara Cohen from Wellesley College
- Frances Power from Radcliffe College
- Harry Rosenstein from Columbia University

1938:

- Winner: Eleanor Ruggles from Vassar College
- Edwin Burrows from Yale University
- Edith Conklin from Bennington College
- Robert T. S. Lowell from Kenyon College
- Samuel French Morse from Harvard University
- Eleanor M. Withington from Mount Holyoke College

1937:

- Winner: Sara L. Allen from Mount Holyoke College
- 2nd place: Reba Jane Miller from Smith College
- Shirley Alberta Bliss from University of Massachusetts
- James H. Green from Amherst College
- M.F. Wolfe from Williams College

1936:

- Winners: Sara L. Allen from Mount Holyoke College and Robert Cushman from Wesleyan University
- Charles Foster from Amherst College
- Samuel French Morse from Dartmouth College
- Margaret Potter from Smith College

1935:

- Winner: Mary Prescott Rice from Bennington College
- 2nd place: Florence Dunbar from Mount Holyoke College
- Keith Huntress from Wesleyan University
- Francis Whitefield from Harvard University

1934:

- Winner: Louise S. Porter from Mount Holyoke College
- 2nd place: Philip Horton from Princeton University
- Thomas John Carlisle from Williams College
- Gertrude V.V. Franchot from Bryn Mawr College
- J. Edward Grubb from Wesleyan University

1933:

- Winner: M. Virginia Hamilton from Mount Holyoke College
- William Kimball Flaccus from Dartmouth College
- Robert Alan Green from Amherst College
- Israel Smith from Middlebury College
- Constance Walther from Smith College
- Adelaide Weinstock from Wheaton College

1932:

- Winner: M. Virginia Hamilton from Mount Holyoke College
- James Agee from Harvard University
- John Finch from Wesleyan University
- Townsend Miller from Yale University
- Muriel Rukeyser from Vassar College
- Lawrence Stapleton from Smith College
- A.P. Sweet from Princeton University

1931:

- Winner: William Kimball Flaccus from Dartmouth College
- 2nd place: M. Virginia Hamilton from Mount Holyoke College
- Elizabeth Massie from Middlebury College
- Hugo Saglio from Amherst College
- Carl Rodney Shom from University of New Hampshire
- Ruth H. Dodge from University of New Hampshire

1930:

- Winner: Winfield Townley Scott from Brown University
- Sarah-Elizabeth Roger from Barnard College
- Peter Yates from Princeton University
- Anita Young from Mount Holyoke College
- Mary Blodgett from Radcliffe College
- Richard Ely Morse from Amherst College

1929 (only year held at Wesleyan University):

- Winner: John F. Swain from Wesleyan University
- Frances Strunsky from Vassar College
- Edward Scribner Cobb from Amherst College
- Constance Klugh from Mount Holyoke College
- Edgar Williams Larkin from Williams College

1928:

- Winner: Tom Prideaux from Yale University
- Doris Clark from Mount Holyoke College
- Anne Lundgren from Connecticut College
- John F. Swain from Wesleyan University

1927:

- Winner: Martha Hodgson from Mount Holyoke College
- Jane Boone from Vassar College
- Margaret Haley from Bryn Mawr College
- Lucia Jordan from Smith
- Judith Stern from Wellesley College

1926:

- Winner: Josephine Garwood from Barnard College
- John Holmes from Tufts University
- Edith Horton from Cornell University
- Judith Stern Wellesley College
- George Cassidy from Brown University
- Elizabeth Whitney from Mount Holyoke College
- Henry Zolinsky from College of the City of New York

1925:

- Winner: Roberta Teale Swartz from Mount Holyoke College
- John Abbott from Harvard
- Curtis Canfield from Amherst
- Barbara Ling from Bryn Mawr College (Honorable Mention)
- Judith Stern from Wellesley College

1924:

- Winner: Roberta Teale Swartz from Mount Holyoke College
- William Troy from Yale University
- Martha E. Keller from Vassar College

1923:

- Winner: Anita Elizabeth Don from Mount Holyoke College
- Julia C. Abbe from Mount Holyoke College
- Katharine Lee from Mount Holyoke College
- Kathleen S. Moore from Mount Holyoke College
- Roberta Teale Swartz from Mount Holyoke College
- Rezia Rowley from Mount Holyoke College
- Elizabeth Whitney from Mount Holyoke College

== See also ==
- List of poetry awards
- Poetry prizes
