= National Civic Federation =

Former American economic organization

The official organ of the National Civic Federation was a magazine called The National Civic Federation Review.

The National Civic Federation (NCF) was an American economic organization founded in 1900 which brought together chosen representatives of big business and organized labor, as well as consumer advocates in an attempt to ameliorate labor disputes. It favored moderate progressive reform and sought to resolve disputes arising between industry and organized labor. The NCF ceased operations in 1950.

== History ==
=== Background ===
One of the earliest forerunners of the National Civic Federation was the Chicago Civic Federation (CCF), which was also known as the Civic Federation of Chicago, established in 1893.

Ralph M. Easley, the CCF's gregarious head who wanted the NCF to "serve as a medium of sympathy and acquaintance between persons and societies who pursue various and differing vocations and objects, who differ in nationality, creed, and surrounding [and] who are unknown to each other." This federation of civic and reform leaders community took as its primary goal "to focus the new ideals of civic cooperation and social efficiency on the task of renovating Chicago society."

Easley was thrust into the public spotlight in 1899 when the CCF held a conference in Chicago on problems presented by the various monopolistic Trusts which dominated most of the key sections of the American economy. This gathering was met by widespread acclaim in the press and provided the gravitas necessary for a larger organization drawing in the participation of top economic leaders from around the country.

=== Establishment ===
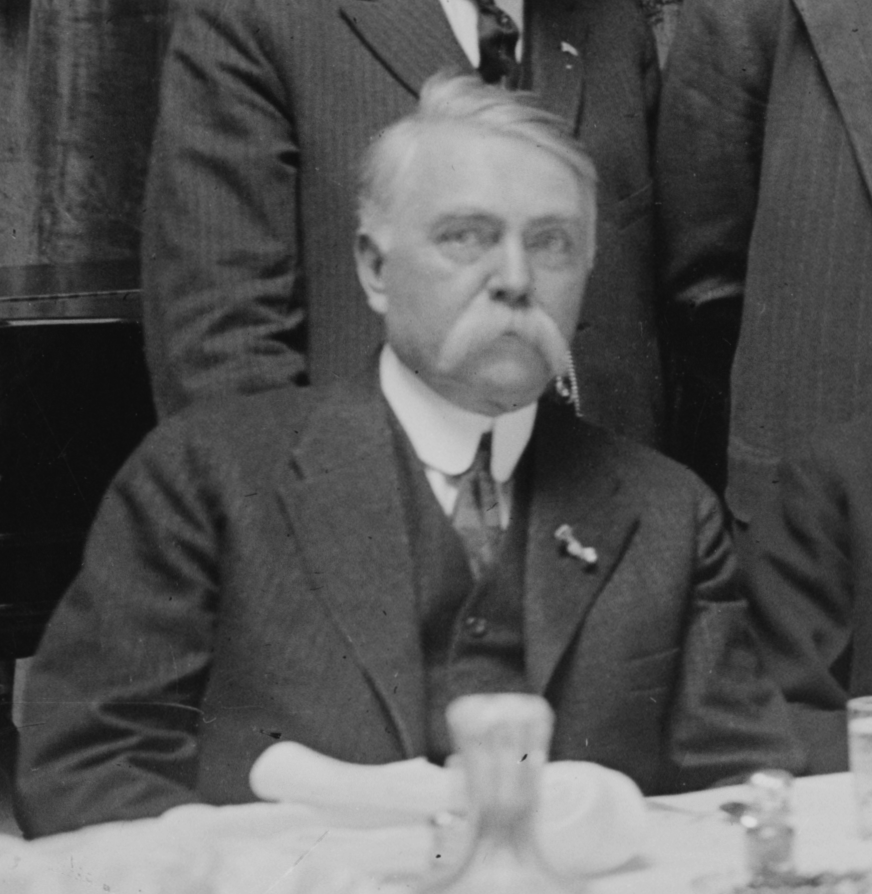
NCF founder Ralph M. Easley in 1924.

In June 1900 Easley reestablished his civic federation idea on a broader basis with the formation of the National Civic Federation (NCF). The organization drew its membership in equal parts from the camps of business, labor, and members of the unaffiliated public. Easley would serve as chairman of the NCF’s executive council throughout the federation’s forty-five-year history.

Easley, a former teacher and journalist, was himself a staunch supporter of the Republican Party and conservative who sought social peace and the preservation of the current social system through cooperation between the various social classes. Easley believed that such collaboration between the leaders of industry and labor was necessary to mitigate potential dangers associated with a continuation and expansion of the class struggle between these social groups.

The NCF's work was conducted through special subcommittees and in national conferences. The group also produced publications, authored draft legislation, and engaged in lobbying of government officials.

Early activists included U.S. Treasury Secretary Lyman Gage, the CCF’s two-time president; social worker Jane Addams; and social scientist and civic commissioner Edward Bemis. The federation's first president was wealthy businessman-turned-United States Senator Mark Hanna, while its original vice-president was American Federation of Labor leader Samuel Gompers.

Other NCF founding members from trade unions included Daniel Keefe (International Longshoremen's Association), John Mitchell (United Mine Workers) and J. J. Sullivan (Typographers). Over the years, the federation's Executive Council included representatives of employers such as Vincent Astor, Jeremiah Jenks, Seth Low, and George W. Perkins.

=== Development ===
Republican Party stalwart Mark Hanna was a key figure in the NCF.

From the outset the NCF was dominated by the leaders of big business. In addition to Mark Hanna, leading roles were played by utilities magnates Samuel Insull and George B. Cortelyou, banker Franklin MacVeagh, and industrialist Andrew Carnegie. By 1903 nearly one-third of the 367 American corporations with a capitalization of more than $10 million were represented in the NCF, as were 16 of the 67 biggest railroads in the country.

Major Republican leaders, such as President William McKinley and Senator Mark Hanna, made pro-labor statements. According to Gwendolyn Mink:

The escalation in labor disruptions and the expansion in union membership encouraged business leaders to promote union-employer cooperation in order to rationalize production and maximize efficiency. The AFL was the linchpin of such cooperation. Where AFL unions existed, the AFL could be called upon to manage labor conflict; equally important, the AFL was unlikely to sacrifice its organization to the volatility of industrial unionism.

During its first years of existence the NCF mediated several labor disputes and helped to broker agreements between capital and labor. The organization became active behind the scenes in a major Anthracite coal strike of 1902. It brought together coal operators and unionized miners to forge a solution to the work stoppage. Employers backing the NCF's approach to the labor problem envisioned a mutually beneficial social peace springing from collective bargaining, a position sharply criticized by other employers organized in the National Association of Manufacturers, which sought a crushing of trade unions and the establishment of an open shop in American industry.

The National Civic Federation was instrumental in expanding and helping make uniform state laws regarding child labor, workmen's compensation, and factory safety.

The NCF is credited with the passage in 1913 of the Newlands Labor Act for mediation of railroad disputes. The group also helped pave the way for the Federal Trade Commission Act of 1914.

=== Decline ===
With the coming of war in Europe and a drive for the armament of America under the slogan of "Preparedness," the National Civic Federation began to take on the character of a patriotic organization, agitating against pacifists, socialists, and sundry others characterized in the words of Theodore Roosevelt as "undesirable citizens."

The death of Gompers in 1924 largely ended its relationship to the labor movement, and business leaders, too, withdrew their financial backing. Easley was consumed by anti-communism, and in the 1930s attacked Franklin Delano Roosevelt and the New Deal. Plagued by financial difficulties, hobbled by Easley's anti-Communism and pushed aside by a rising national consensus in favor of liberalism, the NCF — nearly bankrupt —shut down operations in 1950.

== Opposition ==
The NCF's approach of bringing representatives of business and the labor movement together for negotiations drew criticism both from the anti-union conservatives of the National Association of Manufacturers, who opposed acknowledgement of any right of collective bargaining, as well as from socialists and syndicalists on the left, who saw in the NCF a concrete example of class collaborationism which would dull the desire of the masses for radical change.

One of the rivals to Samuel Gompers' American Federation of Labor (AFL) was the Western Federation of Miners (WFM). Formed on the western frontier of the United States, the WFM was "not yet 'broken in' to the discipline of business management" practiced by eastern labor leaders. The WFM formed the Western Labor Union (WLU) as a rival to the AFL, because the miners feared that the AFL wanted to crush the anti-capitalist spirit of their organization. Fred W. Thompson and Patrick Murfin have written that the miners saw the purpose of the NCF as,

...to housebreak unionism, to confine its growth to those fields where management could use it, and to emasculate it by a united front of labor leaders and captains of industry against all socialistic and insurgent elements.

According to this view, the NCF stood for "responsible unionism," in which union members were expected to follow the dictates of conservative union leaders whom Mark Hanna referred to as "the labor lieutenants of the captains of industry." Fully aware that lieutenants take orders from captains, more militant union leaders saw Gompers' participation in the NCF as a "sellout."

== See also ==
- Melville E. Ingalls —Former NCF President.
- Archibald E. Stevenson —General counsel in the 1930s.

== Publications ==
- National Civic Federation Review
  - Vol. 1 & 2 (1903-1907) | Vol. 3
