= Lou Wall Moore =

American dancer and sculptor (c. 1860–1924)

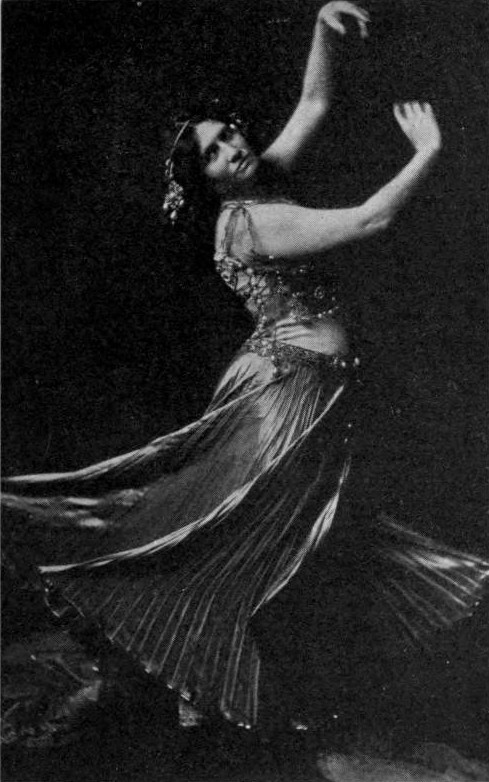
- Moore (c. 1908) in "The Fatal Dance of Salome"
- Born: Lula Belle Wall c. 1860; St. Louis, Missouri, U.S.
- Died: March 13, 1924; Chicago, Illinois, U.S.
- Burial place: Bellefontaine Cemetery, St Louis, Missouri, U.S.
- Other names: Princess Lou, Lou Wall-Moore
- Education: Lexington Baptist Female College
- Alma mater: School of the Art Institute of Chicago
- Occupation(s): Sculptor, stage actress, dancer, costume designer, socialite
- Spouse: Albert "Bert" Wasson Moore (m. 1880–1915; death)

Lou Wall Moore (née Lula Belle Wall; c. 1860–1924) nicknamed "Princess Lou", was an American sculptor, stage actress, costume designer, dancer, and socialite from Chicago. She was known for early modern dance interpretations of ancient Greek dance, as well as appearing in Grecian plays, and for portraying Salome. Her sculptures were primarily busts, done in an ancient Greek style.

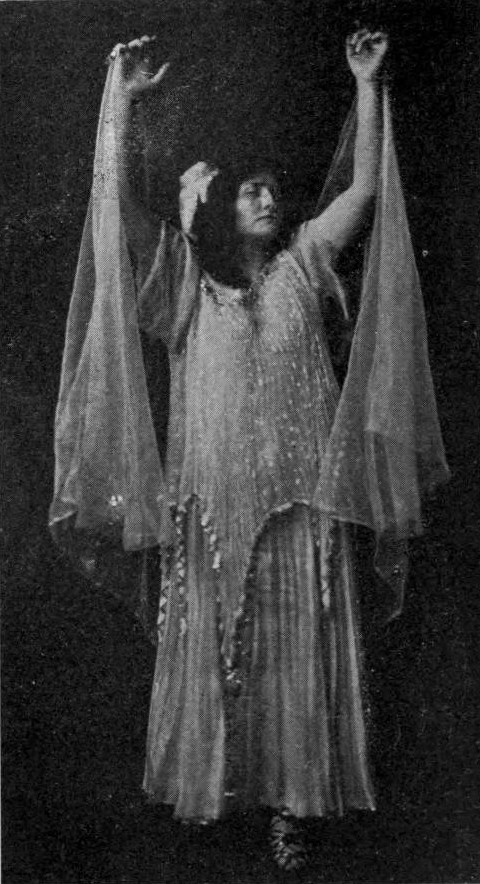
Moore (c. 1908) in "The Dance of the Seasons" representing winter

== Early life and education ==
Lou Wall Moore was born c. 1860 in St. Louis, Missouri, to parents Frances Elizabeth (née Calvert) and Captain Nicholas Wall. Her father was a riverboat captain and a noted steam boatsmen. Her family had moved to Montana Territory around the time she was born, and they remained there until 1876.

Moore attended the Lexington Baptist Female College (around 1878; now part of Wentworth Military Academy and College) in Lexington, Missouri. She continued her education at the School of the Art Institute of Chicago (around 1901), and studied sculpture under Lorado Taft.

== As sculptor ==
Moore was particularly focused on creating bust portraits, statuettes, and reliefs. She often sculpted in a Greek-style. Some of her notable bust sculptures included noted pianist, Fannie Bloomfield Zeisler; professor at Northwestern University, James Taft Hatfield; cellist, Paul Kefer; Chauncey Blair's daughters; civil engineer, Ralph Modjeski's son; and stage performer, Valeria Alicia English.

In 1903, Moore served as the vice president of the Art Students League of Chicago. She won an award at the Saint Louis Exposition for her sculpture.

== As performer and costume designer ==
In 1910, Moore was invited to dance in the White House before President Theodore Roosevelt. Around June 1910, Moore had joined the Sylvan Players, and prior to that she had danced with the Ben Greet Players.

In June to July 1910, she appeared wearing in tights in a performance of "Les Romanesque" in Bloomington, Illinois; it made front page news in the Chicago Tribune, and caused a "religious war" within the Bloomington community when the Deacon of the Methodist church spoke against her performance.

Moore appeared in the cast of many productions at the Chicago Little Theatre, many of which were Grecian plays. She designed the costumes for The Trojan Women in 1913 held at the Chicago Little Theatre.

She was a co-founder alongside poet Maxwell Bodenheim of “The Shop,” a bohemian social club in Chicago.

== Personal life and death ==
For many years she lived at 5476 Ridgewood Court in Chicago, Illinois. She was married to Albert Wasson Moore in 1880; the marriage ended when he died on February 21, 1915.

She died after battling pneumonia on March 13, 1924, in her home on Ridgewood Court, she was around age 60. She is buried in Bellefontaine Cemetery in St. Louis.

== See also ==
- Free dance
- Interpretive dance
- List of dancers
- Women in dance
- Isadora Duncan
