= Carolyn Creedon =

American poet

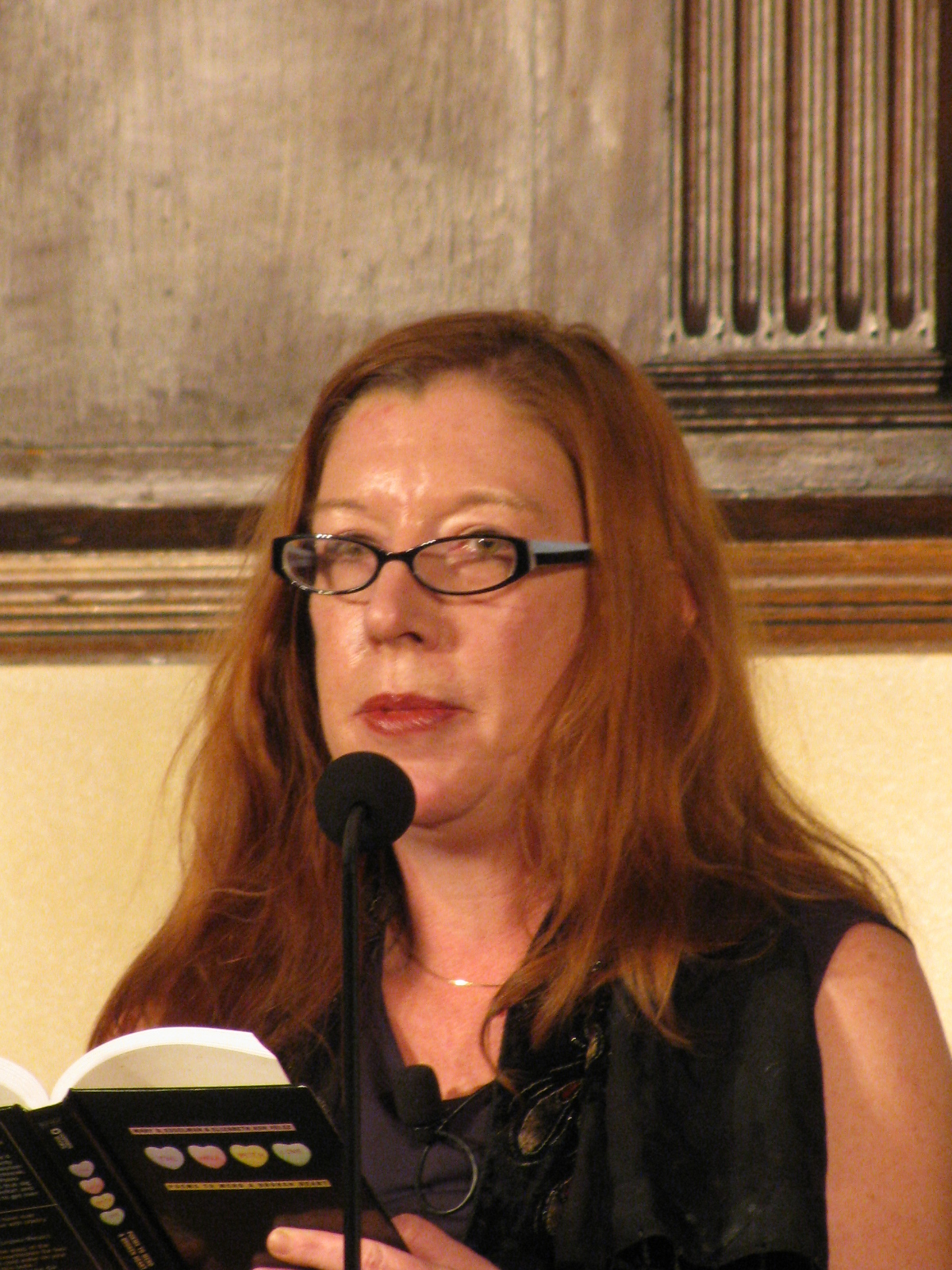
- Reading at Lannan Center for Poetics and Social Practice, 2014
- Born: 1969 (age 56–57); Newport News, Virginia
- Education: Smith College, University of Virginia

Carolyn Creedon (born 1969) Newport News, Virginia is an American poet.

== Life ==
She left college and worked as a waitress in San Francisco. She graduated from Smith College, Washington University in St. Louis, and the University of Virginia with an M.F.A.

Her work has appeared in The American Poetry Review, The Massachusetts Review, Yale Review.

She wrote a letter in support of the Green Street Cafe.

She is married to Paul Andrews. She lives in Charlottesville, Virginia.

== Awards ==
- 2008 Study Abroad Programs in Arts and Writing Contest runner-up
- 2005 Glascock poetry prize
- Academy of American Poets prize

== Works ==
- Wet: Poems, Kent State University Press, 2012, ISBN 9781606351505

=== Anthologies ===
- Lehman, David, ed. (2 April 1998). "litany". The Best of the Best American Poetry: 1988-1997. Simon and Schuster. pp. 88–. ISBN 978-1-4391-0606-8.
- Esselman, Mary; Vélez, Elizabeth, eds. (21 December 2008). "The Nectarine Poem; Pub Poem". Kiss Off: Poems to Set You Free. Grand Central Publishing. pp. 3–. ISBN 978-0-446-55534-0.
- The Best of the Best American Poetry 1988–1997. Scribner. 1998. ISBN 978-0-684-84279-0.
- Esselman, Mary D.; Elizabeth Ash Vélez, eds. (2002). "False Hope". The hell with love: poems to mend a broken heart. Warner Books. ISBN 978-0-446-67854-4.
- Mary Esselman, Elizabeth Velez, eds. You Drive Me Crazy: Love Poems for Real Life Hachette Digital, Inc., 2008, ISBN 9780446554831
- "for the woman painter, because things grow"; "dear god i"; "bonepsalm", serve
- "How to Be a Cowgirl in a Studio Apartment", Rattle #32, Winter 2009

=== Ploughshares ===
- "Michelle". Ploughshares. Spring 2009. Archived from the original on October 10, 2009.
- "Doris". Ploughshares. Spring 2009. Archived from the original on October 10, 2009.
