= Narodna Volya =

Ukrainian-language newspaper published in the US

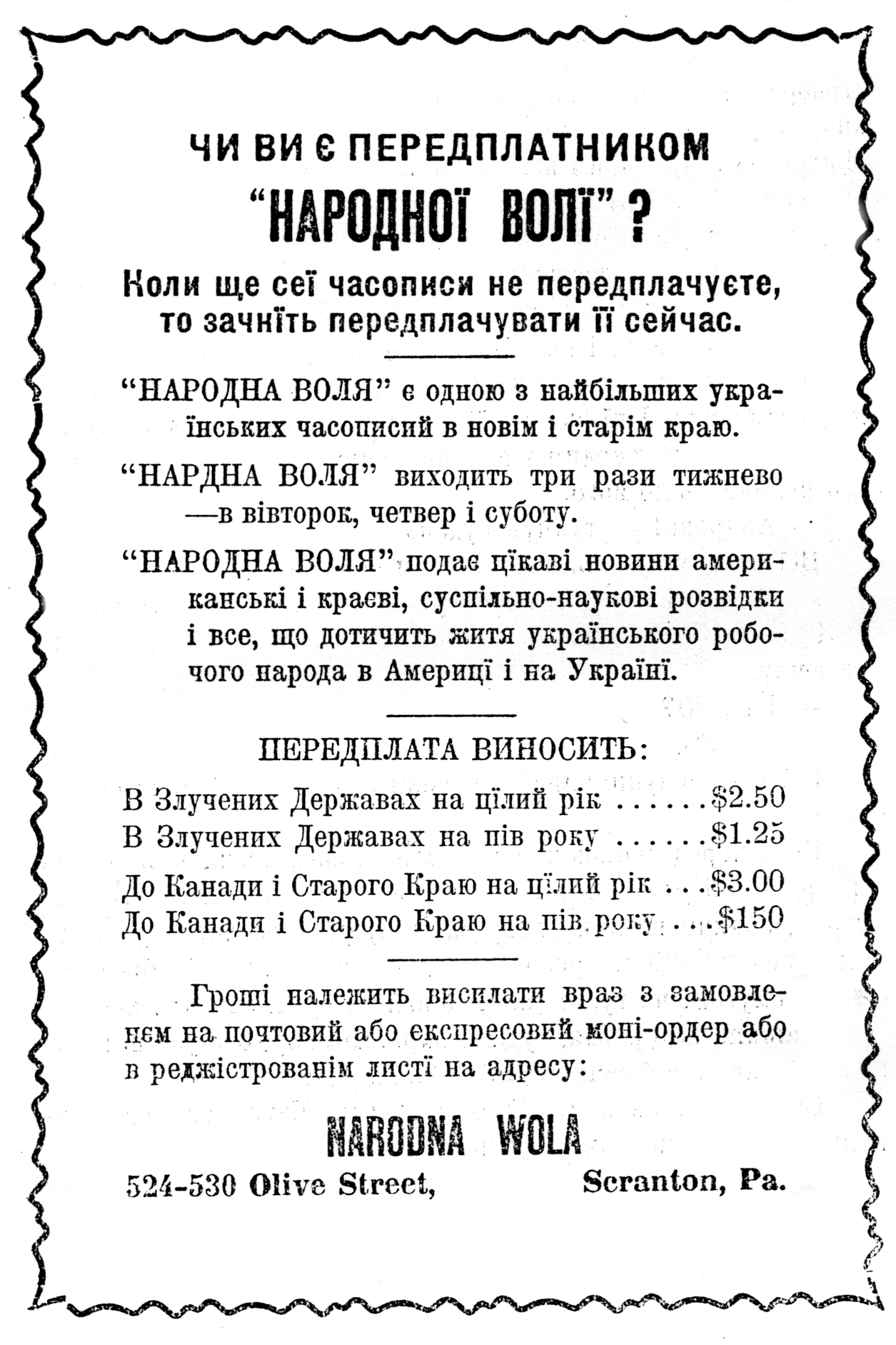
Narodna Wola advertisement

Narodna Volya ('People's Will') was a Ukrainian-language weekly newspaper published from Scranton, Pennsylvania, United States. As of the early 1960s, Matthew Stachiw was the editor of the newspaper. The newspaper had a circulation of around 8,000 at the time. Politically, Narodna Volya was close to the Ukrainian Socialist Party in exile.
