= My Sister and I (Nietzsche) =

Book attributed to Friedrich Nietzsche

- Cover of the first edition
- Publication date: 1951
- Media type: Print (Hardcover and Paperback)
- Pages: 255 (1990 Amok ed.)
- ISBN: 1-878923-01-3 (1990 Amok ed.)

My Sister and I is an apocryphal work claiming to be by German philosopher Friedrich Nietzsche. Assessments have almost universally followed the Nietzsche scholar Walter Kaufmann's conclusion that the work was a 1940s literary forgery. While a small minority of authors argued for its authenticity when the text was first published, these were generally dismissed by subsequent authors.

In the 1990s to 2000s the minority view was reevaluated by another Nietzsche scholar, Walter K. Stewart. He concluded that the text was more likely to contain at least some genuine and otherwise unpublished Nietzsche material than to be fake throughout, and advocated a historical-critical assessment of My Sister and I instead of dismissing it entirely. In particular, Stewart pointed to the consistency of style and prose with Nitzsche's late writings, the focus on questions that Nietzsche had intensely pondered before his mental breakdown, the fact that the supposed evidence for a forgery is mostly claims by Kaufmann which are at least partially erroneous, and that Nietzsche's supposedly utter decrepitude ever since the breakdown are – at least for the supposed period when My Sister and I was written – almost certainly exaggerated.

Other recent authors tend to echo Stewart's reservations to dismiss the text as entirely forged, but as of 2025 no in-depth analysis (beyond Stewart's 2007 monograph) has been published. Some have, however, established more detailed hypotheses regarding the text's provenance, such as Yeshayahu Yariv who commenting on the text's Hebrew translation proposes My Sister and I to be based on loose-sheet hospital notes, which were much later edited into a more coherent text, at which point any forged passages would have been inserted. There have also been at least two attempts to back-translate the hypothetical German original from the published English text.

== Content and supposed origin ==
My Sister and I makes several bold and otherwise unreported biographical claims, most notably of an incestuous relationship between Nietzsche and his sister Elisabeth Förster-Nietzsche, as well as an affair with Richard Wagner's wife Cosima. It is written in a style combining anecdote and aphorism similarly to other Nietzsche works.

The text claims to have been written in 1889 or early 1890 during Nietzsche's stay in an asylum in the Thuringian city of Jena. If legitimate, My Sister and I would be Nietzsche's second autobiographical and final overall work, chronologically following his Wahnbriefe (Madness Letters), written during his extended time of mental collapse.

== First publication ==
My Sister and I was first published in 1951 by Boar's Head Books and distributed by Seven Sirens Press in New York City. Along with Nietzsche's authorship attribution, the translation from German was credited to noted early Nietzsche scholar Oscar Levy.

The book was tied quickly to controversial publisher Samuel Roth, the putative owner of Seven Sirens, who had spent jail time for the unlawful distribution of a version of James Joyce's Ulysses (1922). In the book's introduction, an anonymous publisher claimed to have received the manuscript from a fellow inmate of Nietzsche's in Jena and to have hired Levy to translate the work only to have both German and English manuscripts confiscated, with only the latter surviving.

In a response letter, Levy's daughter vehemently denied her father's involvement with My Sister and I. Kaufmann claimed in a footnote in his Nietzsche: Philosopher, Psychologist, Antichrist (first published 1950) to have received a ghostwriting confession from minor author David George Plotkin in 1965.

== Reception ==
Nietzsche scholars generally adopted Kaufmann's opinion, who immediately identified the book as a forgery in a 1952 article. Evidence against the book cited by Kaufmann and later commentators includes anachronisms like a reference to an 1898 incident, incongruous references to Marxism and the city of Detroit (globally unknown in the late 19th century), a seemingly poor grasp of philosophy, and sexualized pulpy content. Kaufmann also noted instances of clever wordplay in the English text that are impossible to express as such in the German language.

Since the only copy of this alleged work is in English and there is not a single page of what would have been his original in German, opinion has been largely that the work is a forgery.

Nevertheless, a minority hold the work to be authentic. In the mid-1980s, a handful of articles began to call for its reevaluation, including references to more recently discovered journals and letters from Nietzsche and Cosima Wagner. Amok Books' 1990 edition reprints many secondary articles and includes an original introduction calling for a reevaluation of the book. Nietzsche scholar Walter K. Stewart, in his 185-page monograph Nietzsche: My Sister and I — A Critical Study published in 2007, argues for the original's potential legitimacy by conducting a point-by-point analysis of Kaufmann's book review. In his 2011 follow-up, Friedrich Nietzsche My Sister and I: Investigation, Analysis, Interpretation, Stewart uses direct textual analysis to argue that whoever wrote My Sister and I was intimate with every aspect of Nietzsche’s life and perspective.

== Editions ==
- My Sister and I by Friedrich Nietzsche. Trans. and intr. by Oscar Levy. New York: Boar's Head Books 1951; several reprints, mostly diffused: My Sister and I. Trans. and intr. by Oscar Levy. Los Angeles: Amok Books 1990 ISBN 1-878923-01-3 (includes reprints of the controversies on the book)

=== Translations ===
- (Author's name always Friedrich Nietzsche)
  - German: Ich und meine Schwester. Das Werk aus der Nervenklinik. Wien: Turia + Kant 1993 ISBN 3-85132-066-2 (announced, not published)
  - Hebrew: [Achoti Ve-Ani]. Trans. by Halit Yeshurun. Tel Aviv: Yedioth Ahronoth Books 2006 (with a review Nietzsche contra Nietzsche by Yeshayahu Yariv)
  - Japanese: Hi ni kakenoboru / [Übers.:] Rin Jûbishi. - Tôkyô : Shiki-sha 1956
  - Korean: Nich'e-ch'oehu-ŭi-kobaek: na-ŭi-nui-wa-na = My sister & I / P'ŭridŭrihi Nich'e. Yi Tŏk-hŭi omgim. Yi, Tŏk-hŭi [Übers.]. Sŏul: Chakka Chŏngsin 1999 ISBN 89-7288-111-2
  - Portuguese: A minha irmã e eu. Trad. de Pedro José Leal. Lisboa: Hiena 1990
    - Brazilian Portuguese: Minha irmã e eu. Trad. de Rubens Eduardo Frías. São Paulo: Moraes 1992 ISBN 85-88208-77-6
  - Spanish: Mi hermana y yo. Trad. de Bella M. Abelia. Buenos Aires: Rueda 1956; Barcelona: Hacer 1980; Madrid: EDAF 1996 ISBN 84-7166-720-7
  - Chinese: 《我妹妹和我》. Trans. by 陈苍多. 文化艺术出版社 2009 ISBN 75-0392-355-5

== Sources ==
- Walter Kaufmann: Nietzsche and the Seven Sirens. In: Partisan Review, vol. 19, no. 3 (May/June 1952), pp. 372–376 (incl. in Amok-Edition)
- Walter Kaufmann: Review: My Sister and I. In: Philosophical Review, vol. 65, no. 1 (Jan 1955), pp. 152–153 (incl. in Amok-Edition)
- Heinz Frederick Peters: Zarathustra's Sister. The case of Elisabeth and Friedrich Nietzsche. New York: Crown Publishers 1977
- Walter K. Stewart: My Sister an I. The Disputed Nietzsche. In: Thought. A review of Culture and Idea, vol. 61, no. 242 (1986), pp. 321–335 (incl. in Amok-Edition)
- Pia Daniela Volz: Der unbekannte Erotiker. Nietzsches fiktive Autobiographie ‚My Sister and I‘. In: Karl Corino (Hg.): Gefälscht! Nördlingen: Greno 1988, S. 287−304
- Hermann Josef Schmidt: Nietzsche absconditus oder Spurenlesen bei Nietzsche. Kindheit. Teil 3. Berlin / Aschaffenburg: IBDK-Verlag 1990, S. 629–663 ISBN 3-922601-08-1
- R[eginald] J[ohn] Hollingdale: Review of 'My Sister and I'. (ed. Amok Books). In: Journal of Nietzsche Studies, issue 2, autumn 1991, pp. 95–102
- K[athleen] J. Wininger: The Disputed Nietzsche. In: Telos. A Quarterly Journal of Critical Thought, number 91, spring 1992, pp. 185–189 (Review of My Sister and I)
- Heward Wilkinson: review of My Sister and I. In: International Journal of Psychotherapy, vol. 2, n. 1, 1997, pp. 119–124
- Heward Wilkinson: Retrieving a posthumous text-message; Nietzsche's fall: the significance of the disputed asylum writing, My Sister and I. In: International Journal of Psychotherapy, vol. 7, n. 1, 2002, pp. 53–68
- Yeshayahu Yariv: "Nietzsche contra Nietzsche". Tel Aviv 2006 (Afterword to the Hebrew edition)
- Walter K. Stewart: Nietzsche: My Sister and I. A Critical Study s.l.: Xlibris 2007 ISBN 978-1-4257-6097-7 (first monography on topic, 185 pp.)
- Walter K. Stewart: Friedrich Nietzsche: My Sister and I. Investigation, Analysis, Interpretation. Xlibris 2011 ISBN 1-4653-4789-5 (290 pp.)
