= David George Plotkin =

American poet

David George Plotkin AKA "David George Kin" (April, 1899 – March 30, 1968) was an American poet, cartoonist, novelist, and ghostwriter who was reputed author of My Sister and I (memoir attributed to the German philosopher Friedrich Nietzsche) and author of The Plot Against America: Senator Wheeler and the Forces Behind Him.

== Background ==
Plotkin was born in New York City in April 1899. His parents were Russian immigrants; his father was a rabbi. He attended City College, and studied law for three years at Brooklyn Law School.

== Career ==
Plotkin practiced law briefly. Then, he began to work as a cartoonist and writer for the Works Progress Administration.

Plotkin published a book of poems called Ghetto Gutters in 1927. A contemporary review remarked that "the poems are sometimes crude and immature; over-sentimental and yet callous," but also "redolent with the spicy garlic smells of Brownsville and the Bronx."

Plotkin was approached by the publisher Samuel Roth, who asked Plotkin to write a book for him. Plotkin agreed to write a novel about Singapore, in which, he said, "I will ... project my imagination out into the Far East and write an allegory about me and my wife." Plotkin had never been to Singapore. He researched his subject in the New York Library, and wrote a novel entitled Rage in Singapore between November, 1941 and February, 1942. The book contained a description of Singapore's fall to the Japanese; and Singapore actually fell to the Japanese just as Plotkin completed his manuscript. Roth published Rage in Singapore as a work of non-fiction, and claimed that Plotkin "was at Penang with his wife when the Japs captured the island."

In September 1941, Roth paid Plotkin "for translating Hitler's manuscript" which appeared in print (with an introduction by Upton Sinclair) as Hitler's Doctor, one of Roth's best-selling books.

In 1946, Plotkin published The Plot Against America, an exposé of U.S. Senator Burton K. Wheeler. An incensed Wheeler asked the FBI to investigate; the FBI turned his file over the House Un-American Activities Committee. In the process, the government made a connection between Plotkin and Roth.

In 1951 My Sister and I, a memoir attributed to Friedrich Nietzsche, was published, also by Samuel Roth. It alleged that Nietzsche had had an incestuous affair with his sister Elizabeth, and that he also had an affair with Richard Wagner's wife Cosima. The Princeton philosopher Walter Kauffmann dismissed My Sister and I as a forgery by Plotkin, but some scholars still uphold its authenticity. Plotkin is also the likely author of My Life and Loves in Greenwich Village (1954), which was attributed to the bohemian writer Maxwell Bodenheim and published by Samuel Roth.

== Personal life and death ==
Plotkin married, but by late 1941 he was separated from his wife, and living in Woodstock, NY.

Plotkin died on March 30, 1968, in Brooklyn. According to his obituary in The New York Times, he was survived by his widow, Rachel; three brothers, and two sisters.

== Works ==
- Wasn't the Depression Terrible? (New York; Covici, Friede; 1934 (co-author with O. Soglow as "David G. Plotkin")
- Rage in Singapore: the cauldron of Asia boils over (New York: Wisdom House, 1942)
- The Plot Against America: Senator Wheeler and the Forces Behind Him (1946) (under alias "David George Kin")
- My Sister and I (1951)
- Dictionary of American maxims, edited by David George Plotkin (under alias David Kin) (New York: Philosophical Library, 1955)
- Dictionary of American proverbs (1955) (New York, Philosophical Library: 1955)
- Women Without Men: True Stories about Lesbian Love in Greenwich Village (1958, under alias David George Kin)

== See also ==
- Samuel Roth
- Blair Coan
- Elizabeth Dilling
