= Nyshche =

Rural locality in Ternopil Oblast, Ukraine

Nyshche Нище
- Selo
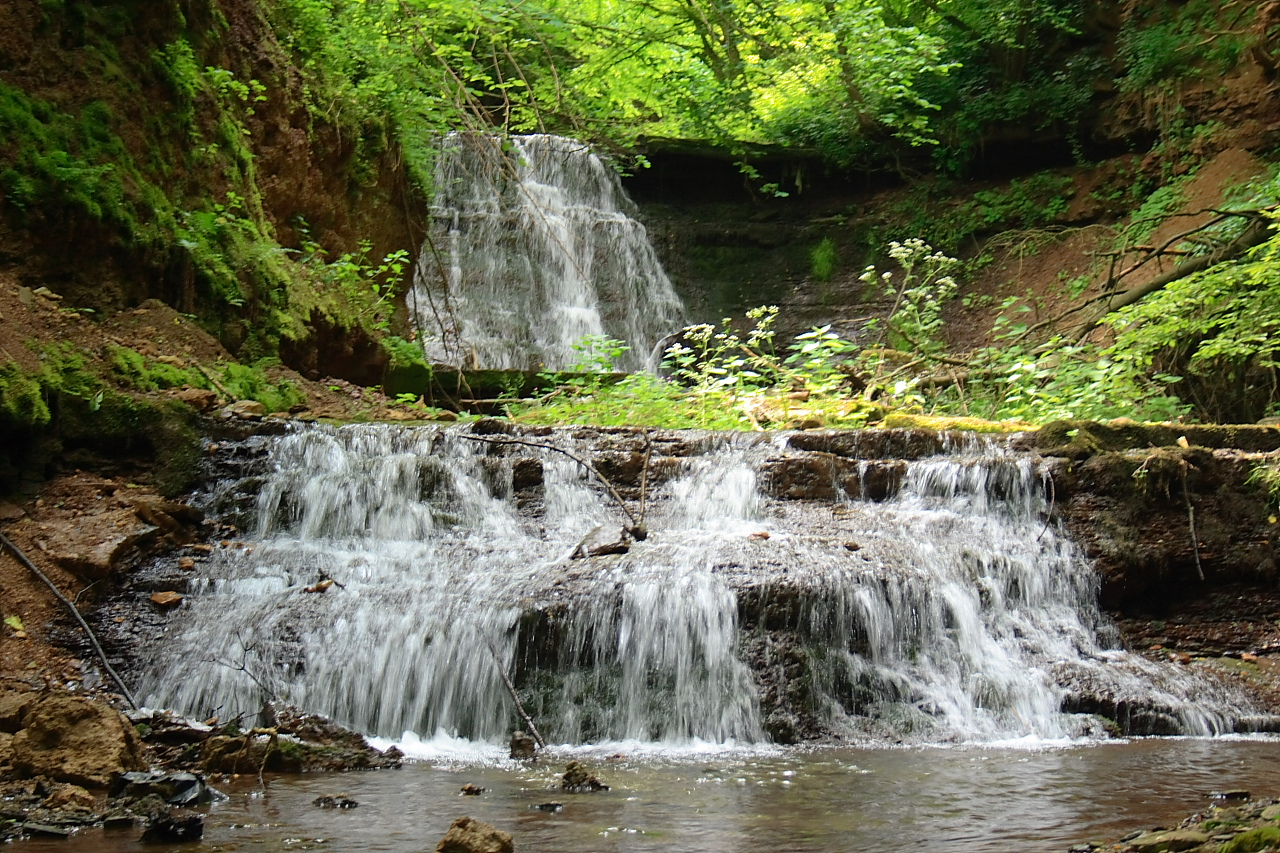
- Rusyliv Falls on the Strypa River

- Location within Ternopil Oblast Location within Ukraine
- Coordinates: 49°48′20″N 25°06′59″E
- Country: Ukraine
- Oblast: Ternopil Oblast
- Raion: Ternopil Raion
- Hromada: Zboriv urban hromada

Nyshche (Ukrainian: Нище) is a selo (formerly a shtetl) on the Strypa River, upriver from the town of Zboriv in the historic region of Galicia in Ukraine.

It is situated in the Ternopil Raion of the Ternopil Oblast in western Ukraine. Nyshche belongs to Zboriv urban hromada, one of the hromadas of Ukraine.

Until 18 July 2020, Nyshche belonged to Zboriv Raion. The raion was abolished in July 2020 as part of the administrative reform of Ukraine, which reduced the number of raions of Ternopil Oblast to three. The area of Zboriv Raion was merged into Ternopil Raion.

== Notable people ==
- Samuel Roth (1893–1974), American anti-censorship publisher
