= History of nihilism =

Study of the development of nihilism

The history of nihilism encompasses the development of a variety of views that deny certain aspects of existence. It is primarily associated with modernity and encompasses views that reject the meaning of life, the existence of moral phenomena, the possibility of objective knowledge, and established political and social structures.

== Etymology, terminology and definition ==
The etymological origin of nihilism is the Latin root word nihil, meaning 'nothing', which is similarly found in the related terms annihilate, meaning 'to bring to nothing', and nihility, meaning 'nothingness'. The term nihilism emerged in several places in Europe during the 18th century, notably in the German form Nihilismus, though was also in use during the Middle Ages to denote certain forms of heresy. The concept itself first took shape within Russian and German philosophy, which respectively represented the two major currents of discourse on nihilism prior to the 20th century. The term likely entered English from either the German Nihilismus, Late Latin nihilismus, or French nihilisme.

Early examples of the term's use are found in German publications. In 1733, German writer Friedrich Leberecht Goetz used it as a literary term in combination with noism (German: Neinismus). In the period surrounding the French Revolution, the term was also a pejorative for certain value-destructive trends of modernity, namely the negation of Christianity and European tradition in general. Nihilism first entered philosophical study within a discourse surrounding Kantian and post-Kantian philosophies, notably appearing in the writings of Swiss esotericist Jacob Hermann Obereit in 1787 and German philosopher Friedrich Heinrich Jacobi in 1799. As early as 1824, the term began to take on a social connotation with German journalist Joseph von Görres attributing it to a negation of existing social and political institutions. The Russian form of the word, nigilizm (Russian: нигилизм), entered publication in 1829 when Nikolai Nadezhdin used it synonymously with skepticism. In Russian journalism the word continued to have significant social connotations.

From the time of Jacobi, the term almost fell completely out of use throughout Europe until it was revived by Russian author Ivan Turgenev, who brought the word into popular use with his 1862 novel Fathers and Sons, leading many scholars to believe he coined the term. The nihilist characters of the novel define themselves as those who "deny everything", who do "not take any principle on faith, whatever reverence that principle may be enshrined in", and who regard "at the present time, negation is the most useful of all". Despite Turgenev's own anti-nihilistic leanings, many of his readers likewise took up the name of nihilist, thus ascribing the Russian nihilist movement its name. Nihilism was further discussed by German philosopher Friedrich Nietzsche, who used the term to describe the Western world's disintegration of traditional morality. For Nietzsche, nihilism applied to both the modern trends of value-destruction expressed in the 'death of God', as well as what he saw as the life-denying morality of Christianity. Under Nietzsche's profound influence, the term was then further treated within French philosophy and continental philosophy more broadly, while the influence of nihilism in Russia arguably continued well into the Soviet era.

Religious scholars such as Altizer have stated that nihilism must necessarily be understood in relation to religion, and that the study of core elements of its character requires fundamentally theological consideration.

== Buddhism ==
The concept of nihilism was discussed by the Buddha (563 BC to 483 BC), as recorded in the Theravada and Mahayana Tripiṭaka. The Tripiṭaka, originally written in Pali, refers to nihilism as natthikavāda and the nihilist view as micchādiṭṭhi. Various sutras within it describe a multiplicity of views held by different sects of ascetics while the Buddha was alive, some of which were viewed by him to be morally nihilistic. In the "Doctrine of Nihilism" in the Apannaka Sutta, the Buddha describes moral nihilists as holding the following views:

- The act of giving produces no beneficial results;
- Good and bad actions produce no results;
- After death, beings are not reborn into the present world or into another world;
- There is no one in the world who, through direct knowledge, can confirm that beings are reborn into this world or into another world.

The Buddha further states that those who hold these views will fail to see the virtue in good mental, verbal, and bodily conduct and the corresponding dangers in misconduct, and will therefore tend towards the latter.

Gautama Buddha have heavily refuted both eternalist (sassatha diṭṭhi) and nihilist (ucceda diṭṭhi) extremes. Instead showing a Middle Way, which is the Noble Eightfold Path to end Duḥkha (unsatisfactoriness). This could be seen in Brahmajāla Sutta (DN 1), where Buddha explains the 7 reasons used by nihilists to declare their views. It also explains that there's no dangerous view as nihilism as those who cling to them, without the fear of karma after death could conduct any wrong they wish without needing to fear their consequences. (Note: Quote: "... [nihilism] as a particularly evil form of wrong view because it denies the long-term consequences of kamma after death.") In Sāmaññaphala Sutta (DN 2), it explains that King Ajatashatru was so displeased with nihilist argument, thinking "is the most foolish and confused of all" six heretical teachers, that he wished to punish its teacher, Sanjaya Belatthiputta.

=== Nirvana and nihilism ===
The culmination of the path that the Buddha taught was nirvana, "a place of nothingness...nonpossession and...non-attachment...[which is] the total end of death and decay." Ajahn Amaro, an ordained Buddhist monk of more than 40 years, observes that in English nothingness can sound like nihilism. However, the word could be emphasized in a different way, so that it becomes no-thingness, indicating that nirvana is not a thing you can find, but rather a state where you experience the reality of non-grasping.

In the Alagaddupama Sutta, the Buddha describes how some individuals feared his teaching because they believe that their self would be destroyed if they followed it. He describes this as an anxiety caused by the false belief in an unchanging, everlasting self. All things are subject to change and taking any impermanent phenomena to be a self causes suffering. Nonetheless, his critics called him a nihilist who teaches the annihilation and extermination of an existing being. The Buddha's response was that he only teaches the cessation of suffering. When an individual has given up craving and the conceit of 'I am' their mind is liberated, they no longer come into any state of 'being' and are no longer born again.

The Aggi-Vacchagotta Sutta records a conversation between the Buddha and an individual named Vaccha that further elaborates on this. In the sutta, Vaccha asks the Buddha to confirm one of the following, with respect to the existence of the Buddha after death:

- After death a Buddha reappears somewhere else;
- After death a Buddha does not reappear;
- After death a Buddha both does and does not reappear;
- After death a Buddha neither does nor does not reappear.

To all four questions, the Buddha answers that the terms "reappears somewhere else," "does not reappear," "both does and does not reappear," and "neither does nor does not reappear," do not apply. When Vaccha expresses puzzlement, the Buddha asks Vaccha a counter question to the effect of: if a fire were to go out and someone were to ask you whether the fire went north, south, east or west, how would you reply? Vaccha replies that the question does not apply and that an extinguished fire can only be classified as 'out'.

Ṭhānissaro Bhikkhu elaborates on the classification problem around the words 'reappear,' etc. with respect to the Buddha and Nirvana by stating that a "Person who has attained the goal [nirvana] is thus indescribable because [they have] abandoned all things by which [they] could be described." The Suttas themselves describe the liberated mind as 'untraceable' or as 'consciousness without feature', making no distinction between the mind of a liberated being that is alive and the mind of one that is no longer alive.

Despite the Buddha's explanations to the contrary, Buddhist practitioners may, at times, still approach Buddhism in a nihilistic manner. Ajahn Amaro illustrates this by retelling the story of a Buddhist monk, Ajahn Sumedho, who in his early years took a nihilistic approach to Nirvana. A distinct feature of Nirvana in Buddhism is that an individual attaining it is no longer subject to rebirth. Ajahn Sumedho, during a conversation with his teacher Ajahn Chah, comments that he is "Determined above all things to fully realize Nirvana in this lifetime...deeply weary of the human condition and...[is] determined not to be born again." To this, Ajahn Chah replies: "What about the rest of us, Sumedho? Don't you care about those who'll be left behind?" Ajahn Amaro comments that Ajahn Chah could detect that his student had a nihilistic aversion to life rather than true detachment.

== Jacobi ==
The term nihilism was first introduced to philosophy by Friedrich Heinrich Jacobi (1743–1819), who used the term to characterize rationalism, and in particular Spinoza's determinism and the Aufklärung, in order to carry out a reductio ad absurdum according to which all rationalism (philosophy as criticism) reduces to nihilism—and thus it should be avoided and replaced with a return to some type of faith and revelation. Bret W. Davis writes, for example:

The first philosophical development of the idea of nihilism is generally ascribed to Friedrich Jacobi, who in a famous letter criticized Fichte's idealism as falling into nihilism. According to Jacobi, Fichte's absolutization of the ego (the 'absolute I' that posits the 'not-I') is an inflation of subjectivity that denies the absolute transcendence of God.

A related but oppositional concept is fideism, which sees reason as hostile and inferior to faith.

== Kierkegaard ==
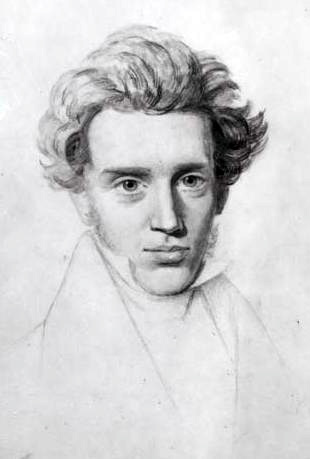
Unfinished sketch c. 1840 of Søren Kierkegaard by his cousin Niels Christian Kierkegaard

Søren Kierkegaard (1813–1855) posited an early form of nihilism, which he referred to as leveling. He saw leveling as the process of suppressing individuality to a point where an individual's uniqueness becomes non-existent and nothing meaningful in one's existence can be affirmed:

Levelling at its maximum is like the stillness of death, where one can hear one's own heartbeat, a stillness like death, into which nothing can penetrate, in which everything sinks, powerless. One person can head a rebellion, but one person cannot head this levelling process, for that would make him a leader and he would avoid being levelled. Each individual can in his little circle participate in this levelling, but it is an abstract process, and levelling is abstraction conquering individuality.

— The Present Age, translated by Alexander Dru. Foreword by Walter Kaufmann, 1962, pp. 51–53.

Kierkegaard, an advocate of a philosophy of life, generally argued against levelling and its nihilistic consequences, although he believed it would be "genuinely educative to live in the age of levelling [because] people will be forced to face the judgement of [levelling] alone." George Cotkin asserts Kierkegaard was against "the standardization and levelling of belief, both spiritual and political, in the nineteenth century," and that Kierkegaard "opposed tendencies in mass culture to reduce the individual to a cipher of conformity and deference to the dominant opinion." In his day, tabloids (like the Danish magazine Corsaren) and apostate Christianity were instruments of levelling and contributed to the "reflective apathetic age" of 19th-century Europe. Kierkegaard argues that individuals who can overcome the levelling process are stronger for it, and that it represents a step in the right direction towards "becoming a true self." As we must overcome levelling, Hubert Dreyfus and Jane Rubin argue that Kierkegaard's interest, "in an increasingly nihilistic age, is in how we can recover the sense that our lives are meaningful."

== Russian nihilism ==
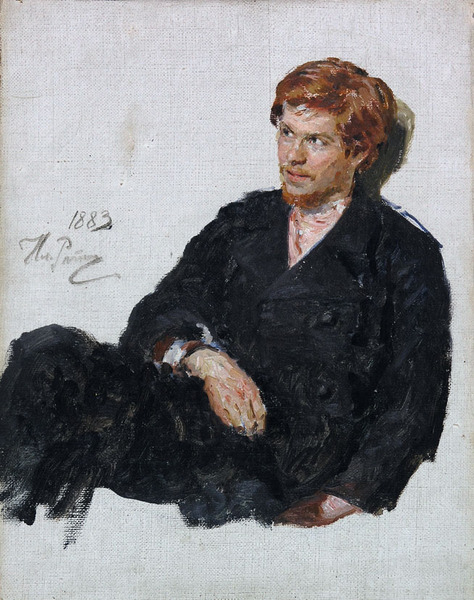
Portrait of a nihilist student by Ilya Repin

From the period 1860–1917, Russian nihilism was both a nascent form of nihilist philosophy and broad cultural movement which overlapped with certain revolutionary tendencies of the era, for which it was often wrongly characterized as a form of political terrorism. Russian nihilism centered on the dissolution of existing values and ideals, incorporating theories of hard determinism, atheism, materialism, positivism, and rational egoism, while rejecting metaphysics, sentimentalism, and aestheticism. Leading philosophers of this school of thought included Nikolay Chernyshevsky and Dmitry Pisarev.

The intellectual origins of the Russian nihilist movement can be traced back to 1855 and perhaps earlier, where it was principally a philosophy of extreme moral and epistemological skepticism. However, it was not until 1862 that the name nihilism was first popularized, when Ivan Turgenev used the term in his celebrated novel Fathers and Sons to describe the disillusionment of the younger generation towards both the progressives and traditionalists that came before them, as well as its manifestation in the view that negation and value-destruction were most necessary to the present conditions. The movement very soon adopted the name, despite the novel's initial harsh reception among both the conservatives and younger generation.

Though philosophically both nihilistic and skeptical, Russian nihilism did not unilaterally negate ethics and knowledge as may be assumed, nor did it espouse meaninglessness unequivocally. Even so, contemporary scholarship has challenged the equating of Russian nihilism with mere skepticism, instead identifying it as a fundamentally Promethean movement. As passionate advocates of negation, the nihilists sought to liberate the Promethean might of the Russian people which they saw embodied in a class of prototypal individuals, or new types in their own words. These individuals, according to Pisarev, in freeing themselves from all authority become exempt from moral authority as well, and are distinguished above the rabble or common masses.

Later interpretations of nihilism were heavily influenced by works of anti-nihilistic literature, such as those of Fyodor Dostoevsky, which arose in response to Russian nihilism. "In contrast to the corrupted nihilists [of the real world], who tried to numb their nihilistic sensitivity and forget themselves through self-indulgence, Dostoevsky's figures voluntarily leap into nihilism and try to be themselves within its boundaries.", writes Japanese scholar Keiji Nishitani. "The nihility expressed in 'if there is no God, everything is permitted', or 'après moi, le déluge', provides a principle whose sincerity they try to live out to the end. They search for and experiment with ways for the self to justify itself after God has disappeared."

== Nietzsche ==
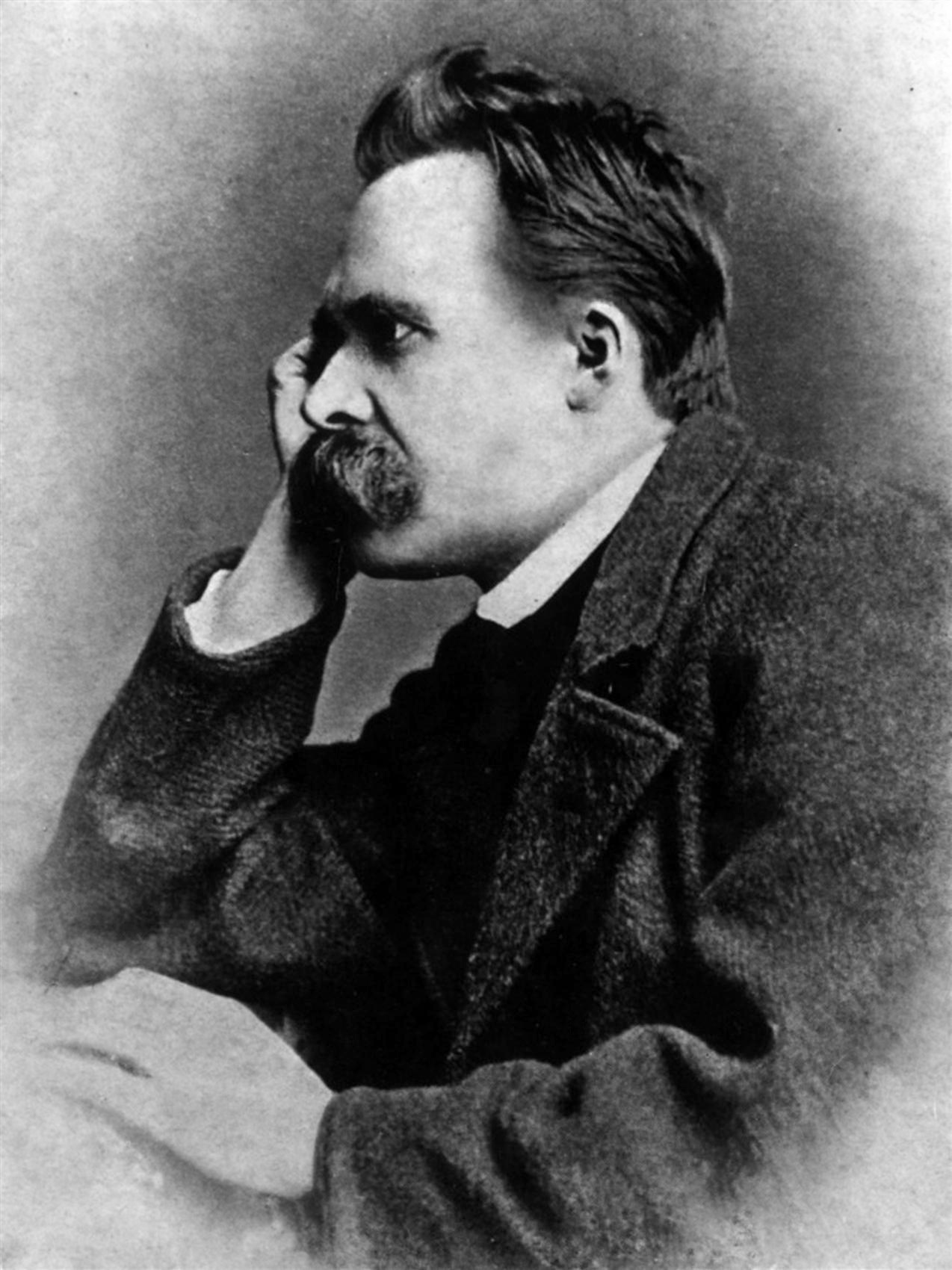
Friedrich Wilhelm Nietzsche

Nihilism is often associated with the German philosopher Friedrich Nietzsche, who provided a detailed diagnosis of nihilism as a widespread phenomenon of Western culture. Though the notion appears frequently throughout Nietzsche's work, he uses the term in a variety of ways, with different meanings and connotations.

With regard to Nietzsche's development of thought, it has been noted in research that although he dealt with "nihilistic" themes from 1869 onwards ("pessimism, with nirvana and with nothingness and non-being"), a conceptual use of nihilism occurred for the first time in handwritten notes in the middle of 1880 (KSA 9.127-128). This was the time of a then popular scientific work that reconstructed the so-called "Russian nihilism" on the basis of Russian newspaper reports on nihilistic incidents (N. Karlowitsch: Die Entwicklung des Nihilismus. Berlin 1880). This collection of material, published in three editions, was not only known to a broad German readership, but its influence on Nietzsche can also be proven.

Karen L. Carr describes Nietzsche's characterization of nihilism as "a condition of tension, as a disproportion between what we want to value (or need) and how the world appears to operate." When we find out that the world does not possess the objective value or meaning that we want it to have or have long since believed it to have, we find ourselves in a crisis. Nietzsche asserts that with the decline of Christianity and the rise of physiological decadence, nihilism is in fact characteristic of the modern age, though he implies that the rise of nihilism is still incomplete and that it has yet to be overcome. Though the problem of nihilism becomes especially explicit in Nietzsche's notebooks (published posthumously), it is mentioned repeatedly in his published works and is closely connected to many of the problems mentioned there.

Nietzsche characterized nihilism as emptying the world and especially human existence of meaning, purpose, comprehensible truth, or essential value. This observation stems in part from Nietzsche's perspectivism, or his notion that "knowledge" is always by someone of some thing: it is always bound by perspective, and it is never mere fact. Rather, there are interpretations through which we understand the world and give it meaning. Interpreting is something we can not go without; in fact, it is a condition of subjectivity. One way of interpreting the world is through morality, as one of the fundamental ways that people make sense of the world, especially in regard to their own thoughts and actions. Nietzsche distinguishes a morality that is strong or healthy, meaning that the person in question is aware that he constructs it himself, from weak morality, where the interpretation is projected on to something external.

Nietzsche discusses Christianity, one of the major topics in his work, at length in the context of the problem of nihilism in his notebooks, in a chapter entitled "European Nihilism." Here he states that the Christian moral doctrine provides people with intrinsic value, belief in God (which justifies the evil in the world) and a basis for objective knowledge. In this sense, in constructing a world where objective knowledge is possible, Christianity is an antidote against a primal form of nihilism, against the despair of meaninglessness. However, it is exactly the element of truthfulness in Christian doctrine that is its undoing: in its drive towards truth, Christianity eventually finds itself to be a construct, which leads to its own dissolution. It is therefore that Nietzsche states that we have outgrown Christianity "not because we lived too far from it, rather because we lived too close." As such, the self-dissolution of Christianity constitutes yet another form of nihilism. Because Christianity was an interpretation that posited itself as the interpretation, Nietzsche states that this dissolution leads beyond skepticism to a distrust of all meaning.

Stanley Rosen identifies Nietzsche's concept of nihilism with a situation of meaninglessness, in which "everything is permitted." According to him, the loss of higher metaphysical values that exist in contrast to the base reality of the world, or merely human ideas, gives rise to the idea that all human ideas are therefore valueless. Rejecting idealism thus results in nihilism, because only similarly transcendent ideals live up to the previous standards that the nihilist still implicitly holds. The inability for Christianity to serve as a source of valuating the world is reflected in Nietzsche's famous aphorism of the madman in The Gay Science. The death of God, in particular the statement that "we killed him", is similar to the self-dissolution of Christian doctrine: due to the advances of the sciences, which for Nietzsche show that man is the product of evolution, that Earth has no special place among the stars and that history is not progressive, the Christian notion of God can no longer serve as a basis for a morality.

One such reaction to the loss of meaning is what Nietzsche calls passive nihilism, which he recognizes in the pessimistic philosophy of Schopenhauer. Schopenhauer's doctrine, which Nietzsche also refers to as Western Buddhism, advocates separating oneself from will and desires in order to reduce suffering. Nietzsche characterizes this attitude as a "will to nothingness", whereby life turns away from itself, as there is nothing of value to be found in the world. This mowing away of all value in the world is characteristic of the nihilist, although in this, the nihilist appears inconsistent: this "will to nothingness" is still a form of valuation or willing. He describes this as "an inconsistency on the part of the nihilists":

A nihilist is a man who judges of the world as it is that it ought not to be, and of the world as it ought to be that it does not exist. According to this view, our existence (action, suffering, willing, feeling) has no meaning: the pathos of 'in vain' is the nihilists' pathos – at the same time, as pathos, an inconsistency on the part of the nihilists.

— Friedrich Nietzsche, KSA 12:9 [60], The Will to Power, Section 585, Translated by Walter Kaufmann.

Nietzsche's relation to the problem of nihilism is a complex one. He approaches the problem of nihilism as deeply personal, stating that this predicament of the modern world is a problem that has "become conscious" in him. According to Nietzsche, it is only when nihilism is overcome that a culture can have a true foundation upon which to thrive. He wished to hasten its coming only so that he could also hasten its ultimate departure.

He states that there is at least the possibility of another type of nihilist in the wake of Christianity's self-dissolution, one that does not stop after the destruction of all value and meaning and succumb to the following nothingness. This alternate, 'active' nihilism on the other hand destroys to level the field for constructing something new. This form of nihilism is characterized by Nietzsche as "a sign of strength," a willful destruction of the old values to wipe the slate clean and lay down one's own beliefs and interpretations, contrary to the passive nihilism that resigns itself with the decomposition of the old values. This willful destruction of values and the overcoming of the condition of nihilism by the constructing of new meaning, this active nihilism, could be related to what Nietzsche elsewhere calls a free spirit or the Übermensch from Thus Spoke Zarathustra and The Antichrist, the model of the strong individual who posits his own values and lives his life as if it were his own work of art. It may be questioned, though, whether "active nihilism" is indeed the correct term for this stance, and some question whether Nietzsche takes the problems nihilism poses seriously enough.

=== Heideggerian interpretation of Nietzsche ===
Martin Heidegger's interpretation of Nietzsche influenced many postmodern thinkers who investigated the problem of nihilism as put forward by Nietzsche. Only recently has Heidegger's influence on Nietzschean nihilism research faded. As early as the 1930s, Heidegger was giving lectures on Nietzsche's thought. Given the importance of Nietzsche's contribution to the topic of nihilism, Heidegger's influential interpretation of Nietzsche is important for the historical development of the term nihilism.

Heidegger's method of researching and teaching Nietzsche is explicitly his own. He does not specifically try to present Nietzsche as Nietzsche. He rather tries to incorporate Nietzsche's thoughts into his own philosophical system of Being, Time and Dasein. In his Nihilism as Determined by the History of Being (1944–46), Heidegger tries to understand Nietzsche's nihilism as trying to achieve a victory through the devaluation of the, until then, highest values. The principle of this devaluation is, according to Heidegger, the will to power. The will to power is also the principle of every earlier valuation of values. How does this devaluation occur and why is this nihilistic? One of Heidegger's main critiques on philosophy is that philosophy, and more specifically metaphysics, has forgotten to discriminate between investigating the notion of a being (seiende) and Being (Sein). According to Heidegger, the history of Western thought can be seen as the history of metaphysics. Moreover, because metaphysics has forgotten to ask about the notion of Being (what Heidegger calls Seinsvergessenheit), it is a history about the destruction of Being. That is why Heidegger calls metaphysics nihilistic. This makes Nietzsche's metaphysics not a victory over nihilism, but a perfection of it.

Heidegger, in his interpretation of Nietzsche, has been inspired by Ernst Jünger. Many references to Jünger can be found in Heidegger's lectures on Nietzsche. For example, in a letter to the rector of Freiburg University of November 4, 1945, Heidegger, inspired by Jünger, tries to explain the notion of "God is dead" as the "reality of the Will to Power." Heidegger also praises Jünger for defending Nietzsche against a too biological or anthropological reading during the Nazi era.

Heidegger's interpretation of Nietzsche influenced a number of important postmodernist thinkers. Gianni Vattimo points at a back-and-forth movement in European thought, between Nietzsche and Heidegger. During the 1960s, a Nietzschean 'renaissance' began, culminating in the work of Mazzino Montinari and Giorgio Colli. They began work on a new and complete edition of Nietzsche's collected works, making Nietzsche more accessible for scholarly research. Vattimo explains that with this new edition of Colli and Montinari, a critical reception of Heidegger's interpretation of Nietzsche began to take shape. Like other contemporary French and Italian philosophers, Vattimo does not want, or only partially wants, to rely on Heidegger for understanding Nietzsche. On the other hand, Vattimo judges Heidegger's intentions authentic enough to keep pursuing them. Philosophers who Vattimo exemplifies as a part of this back and forth movement are French philosophers Deleuze, Foucault and Derrida. Italian philosophers of this same movement are Cacciari, Severino and himself. Jürgen Habermas, Jean-François Lyotard and Richard Rorty are also philosophers who are influenced by Heidegger's interpretation of Nietzsche.

=== Deleuzean interpretation of Nietzsche ===
Gilles Deleuze's interpretation of Nietzsche's concept of nihilism is different—in some sense diametrically opposed—to the usual definition (as outlined in the rest of this article). Nihilism is one of the main topics of Deleuze's early book Nietzsche and Philosophy (1962). There, Deleuze repeatedly interprets Nietzsche's nihilism as "the enterprise of denying life and depreciating existence". Nihilism thus defined is therefore not the denial of higher values, or the denial of meaning, but rather the depreciation of life in the name of such higher values or meaning. Deleuze therefore (with, he claims, Nietzsche) says that Christianity and Platonism, and with them the whole of metaphysics, are intrinsically Nihilist.

== Postmodernism ==
Postmodern and poststructuralist thought has questioned the very grounds on which Western cultures have based their 'truths': absolute knowledge and meaning, a 'decentralization' of authorship, the accumulation of positive knowledge, historical progress, and certain ideals and practices of humanism and the Enlightenment.

=== Derrida ===
Jacques Derrida, whose deconstruction is perhaps most commonly labeled nihilistic, did not himself make the nihilistic move that others have claimed. Derridean deconstructionists argue that this approach rather frees texts, individuals or organizations from a restrictive truth, and that deconstruction opens up the possibility of other ways of being. Gayatri Chakravorty Spivak, for example, uses deconstruction to create an ethics of opening up Western scholarship to the voice of the subaltern and to philosophies outside of the canon of western texts. Derrida himself built a philosophy based upon a 'responsibility to the other'. Deconstruction can thus be seen not as a denial of truth, but as a denial of our ability to know truth. That is to say, it makes an epistemological claim, compared to nihilism's ontological claim.

=== Lyotard ===
Lyotard argues that, rather than relying on an objective truth or method to prove their claims, philosophers legitimize their truths by reference to a story about the world that can not be separated from the age and system the stories belong to—referred to by Lyotard as meta-narratives. He then goes on to define the postmodern condition as characterized by a rejection both of these meta-narratives and of the process of legitimation by meta-narratives. This concept of the instability of truth and meaning leads in the direction of nihilism, though Lyotard stops short of embracing the latter.

In lieu of meta-narratives we have created new language-games in order to legitimize our claims which rely on changing relationships and mutable truths, none of which is privileged over the other to speak to ultimate truth.

=== Baudrillard ===
Postmodern theorist Jean Baudrillard wrote briefly of nihilism from the postmodern viewpoint in Simulacra and Simulation. He stuck mainly to topics of interpretations of the real world over the simulations of which the real world is composed. The uses of meaning were an important subject in Baudrillard's discussion of nihilism:

The apocalypse is finished, today it is the precession of the neutral, of forms of the neutral and of indifference ... all that remains, is the fascination for desertlike and indifferent forms, for the very operation of the system that annihilates us. Now, fascination (in contrast to seduction, which was attached to appearances, and to dialectical reason, which was attached to meaning) is a nihilistic passion par excellence, it is the passion proper to the mode of disappearance. We are fascinated by all forms of disappearance, of our disappearance. Melancholic and fascinated, such is our general situation in an era of involuntary transparency.

— Jean Baudrillard, Simulacra and Simulation, "On Nihilism," trans. 1995.
