= Magnum in parvo: A philosophy in compendium =

1888 book on work by Friedrich Nietzsche

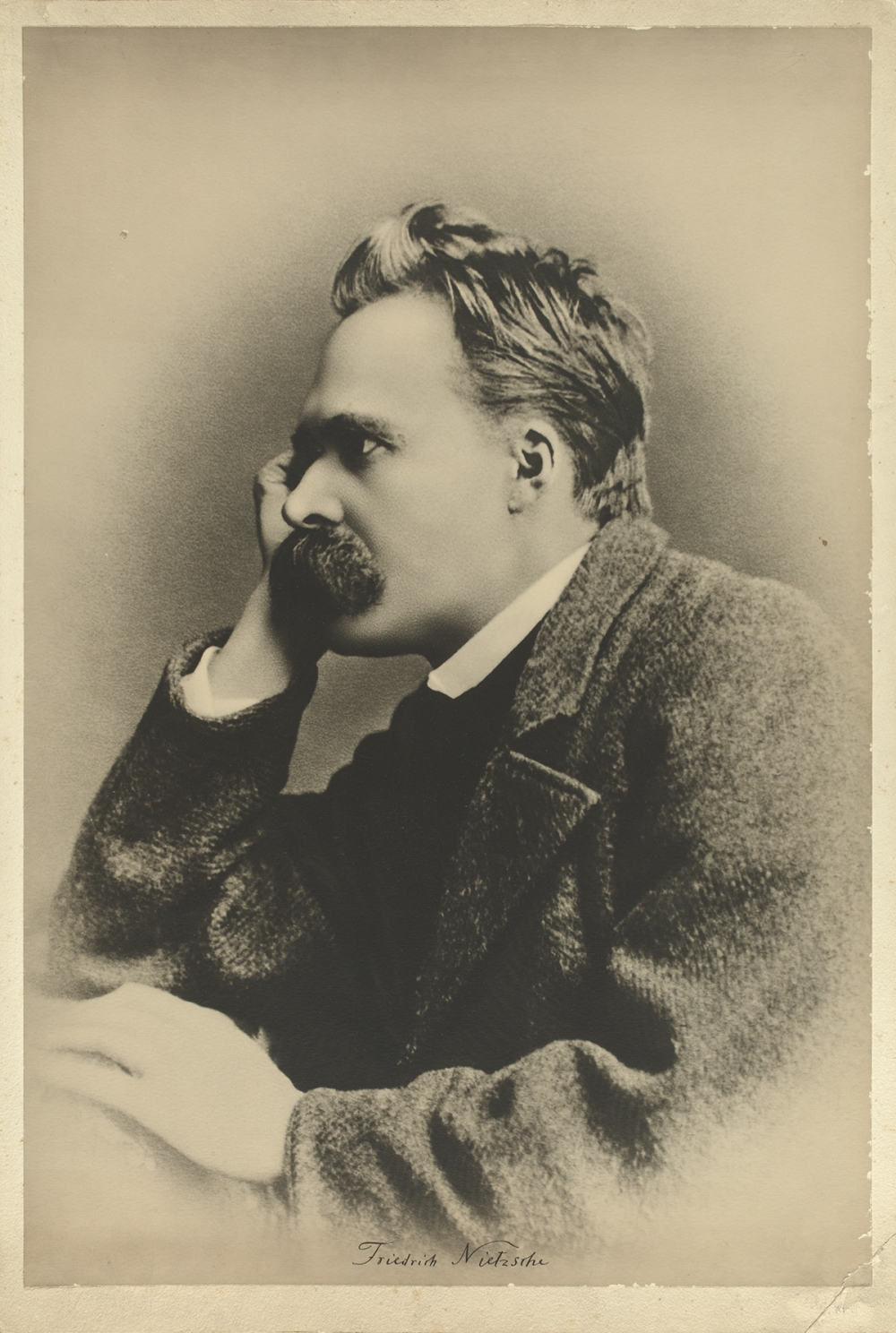
Portrait of Nietzsche, 1882 (Gustav Adolf Schultze)

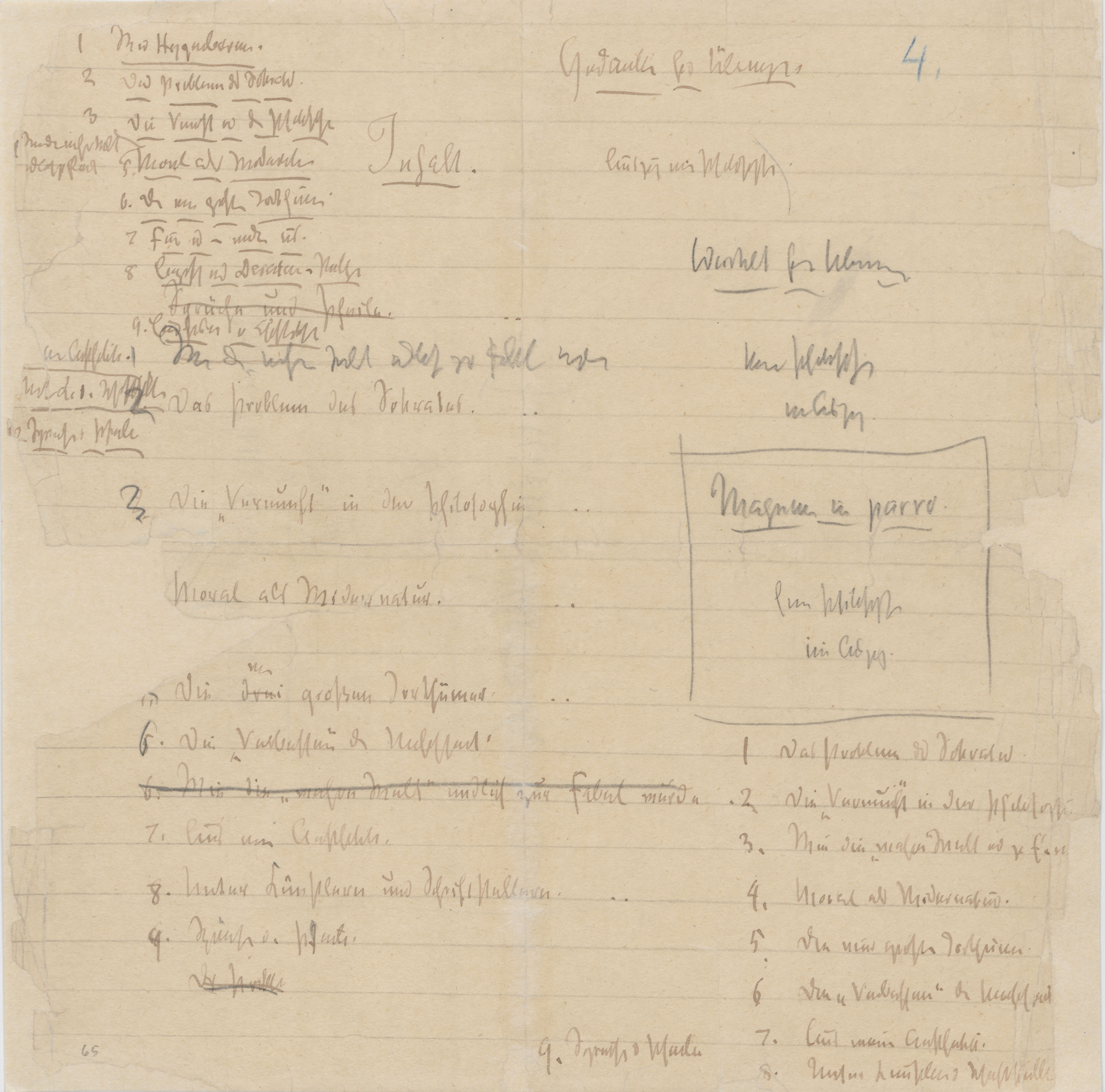
Plan for "Magnum in parvo. Eine Philosophie im Auszug" (Title of the book, name and numbering of the twelve chapters)- Nietzsche's posthumous notebooks - Folder with loose sheets - Mp-XVI-4,29 - May to October 1888 (http://www.nietzschesource.org/DFGA/Mp-XVI-4,29)

Magnum in Parvo: A Philosophy in Compendium (1888), in German Magnum in parvo: Eine Philosophie im Auszug, is a project of work of Friedrich Nietzsche (1844–1900) conceived in Sils Maria, Switzerland, at the end of August 1888, the last summer of his lucid life.

This is a book that the Röcken philosopher planned as a rigorous and precise synthesis of his ill-fated capital project The Will to Power and in which the key themes of his thought are addressed. However, a sudden change of opinion in a context of growing mental excitement prior to Nietzsche's near psychophysical collapse determined that this unique work was finally published not in the planned unitary form, but dissolved and mixed with other materials in two different books: Twilight of the Idols (1889) and The Antichrist (1894).

In 2024, professor Joaquín Riera Ginestar translated, wrote the prologue and annotated the first known edition of Magnum in Parvo (Alianza Editorial, 2024). For the scientific reconstruction of the work as Nietzsche designed it, professor Riera used the posthumous fragments and the original Nietzschean manuscripts, studied, systematized and critically edited by Giorgio Colli and Mazzino Montinari.

Magnum in Parvo edition (also available in English) represents the recovery of a work of notable philosophical and literary value, more complete, overall, than the two books into which it was dissolved, since it allows clear, synthetic and profound access to key concepts of mature Nietzschean thought such as the death of God, nihilism, Übermensch, eternal return and amor fati.

== Bibliography ==
- Colli, G. y Montinari, M. (1969). Friedrich Nietzsche Werke. Kritische Gesamtausgabe, VI, 3: Der Fall Wagner. Götzen-Dämmerung. / Nachgelassene Schriften (August 1888-Anfang Januar 1889): Der Antichrist. Ecce homo. Dionysos-Dithyramben. / Nietzsche contra Wagner. Berlín: Walter de Gruyter.
- Colli, G. y Montinari M. (1972). Friedrich Nietzsche Werke. Kritische Gesamtausgabe, VIII, 3. Nachgelassene Fragmente Anfang 1888 bis Anfang Januar 1889. Berlin et New York: Walter de Gruyter.
- Colli, G. y Montinari, M. (1988). Friedrich Nietzsche Sämtliche Werke. Kritische Studienausgabe, 14, Kommentar zu den Bänden 1-13. Berlín/Nueva York/Múnich: Walter de Gruyter.
- Montinari, M. (1982). Nietzsche lesen. Berlin: Walter de Gruyter.
- Morey, M. (2018). Vidas de Nietzsche. Madrid: Alianza Editorial.
- Nietzsche, F. (1997). El Anticristo. Traducción, introducción y notas de Andrés Sánchez Pascual. Madrid: Alianza Editorial.
- Nietzsche, F. (2006). Fragmentos Póstumos. Volumen IV (1885- 1889). Edición de Diego Sánchez Meca. Madrid: Editorial Tecnos.
- Nietzsche, F. (2024). Magnum in parvo: Una filosofía en compendio. Traducción, introducción y notas de Joaquín Riera Ginestar. Madrid: Alianza Editorial.
- Nietzsche, F. (2025). Magnum in Parvo: A Philosophy in Compendium. Text translated, reconstructed, introduced and annotated by professor Joaquin Riera Ginestar. Independently published.
- Nietzsche, F., Digital critical edition of the complete works and letters, based on the critical text by G. Colli and M. Montinari, Berlin/New York, de Gruyter 1967-, edited by Paolo D’Iorio http://www.nietzschesource.org/#eKGWB
- Román Aponte, M. (2025). Friedrich Nietzsche, Magnum in parvo. Una filosofía en compendio (edición, traducción, introducción y notas de J. Riera Ginestar), 2024. Quaderns De Filosofia, 12(1), 233–238. https://doi.org/10.7203/qfia.12.1.30769 https://turia.uv.es//index.php/qfilosofia
- Sommer, A.U. (2012). Nietzsche-Kommentar: Der Fall Wagner und Götzen-Dämmerung. Berlín: Walter de Gruyter.
- Sommer, A.U. (2013). Nietzsche-Kommentar: Der Antichrist, Ecce homo, Dionysos-Dithyramben und Nietzsche contra Wagner. Berlín: Walter de Gruyter.
