= Friedrich Würzbach =

Friedrich Wilhelm Adolf Würzbach (15 June 1886 – 14 May 1961) was a Nietzsche scholar, Nazi sympathiser and convinced propagandist. He was born in Berlin in the summer of 1886 to a Polish-Jewish mother and German-Protestant father, and died in 1961 in Munich.

== The Nietzsche years (1919–1933) ==
In 1919 Würzbach founded the Nietzsche Society in Munich. Other members soon included writers and intellectuals such as Thomas Mann and Hugo von Hofmannsthal. Many European academics of the time perceived a kindred soul in Friedrich Nietzsche and identified with his cultural criticism. Würzbach's first publication in 1921 was a treatise on Dionysus which rehashed certain elements of Nietzsche's thoughts on the Manichean rivalry of Apollonian and Dionysian forces within cultures. Apart from his doctoral thesis published 1924, where he offered an eccentric theory on prehistoric artifacts and tools, his subsequent career was almost exclusively dedicated to his interpretation of Nietzsche.

Throughout the 1920s, Würzbach, along with Richard and Max Oehler, worked on the Musarion Editions of Nietzsche's Complete Works. According to a self-penned resume in 1934, and his later mercy-plea to Hitler in 1940, he gave a number of lectures railing against the "Jewish philosopher Edmund Husserl". He claimed to have given lectures on the subject of Husserl in Berlin ‘25, Freiburg ‘26, Basel ‘26, Paris ‘26, Riga ‘28. Whether in fact these lectures dealt with Husserl in an anti-Semitic manner, as his resume suggests, or whether this was simply the boastings of a pragmatic job-seeker has not yet been established. One thing is certain however, during the 1920s Würzbach drifted toward certain readings of Nietzsche, and philosophy in general, which leaned toward the ultra-nationalist Nazi Weltanschauung which would emerge triumphant in Germany of the ‘30s.

It was at the 1924 International Philosophy Congress in Naples where Würzbach first aired his view that philosophers were determined by their race. Thereby, Kant and others were not just "philosophical Germans, but Germanic philosophers". He was to use this racial argument on numerous occasions throughout his career.

Rather than reading "Germanic" as related to the cultural influence of one's nation, Würzbach became convinced of a biological-racial reading of Nietzsche. As Würzbach asserted in his 1926 Afterword to the Musarion Will to Power, "We proclaim the W.t.P [Will to Power] to be Nietzsche's most important work. We identify as particularly important its biological and regulative character; all that remains is to adumbrate in which sense it is philosophical". He further expounded his biological reading when he claimed that Nietzsche ‘foresaw’ the theory of Keimplasma and identified a "spiritual originary-substance," one which "eternally grounds life" giving the "laws of life". Keimplasma theory, at least Würzbach's reading of August Weismann's work, was a popular basis for Nazi racial theories at it was argued that through Keimplasma certain racial characteristics, temperaments and values could be passed from generation to generation and remain within a given 'race'.

== Nazi propagandist (1933–1939) ==
In 1933 Würzbach was appointed to head of World View [Weltanschauung] at the Munich city radio-station [Reichsender München]. This appointment was approved by Joseph Goebbels. According to a 1933 document, the aim of his shows was to further aggrandize Nazi notions of German racial superiority, beneficent fascism, and of course the thesis of a special destiny for the German ‘race'. Although Würzbach was to claim in his Entnazifizierung [de-Nazification hearings] file, that he had been on a "secret mission" to subvert the regime, his published broadcasts, books and articles imply that Würzbach was in fact, at least publicly, deeply enmeshed within the NSDAP doctrine.

== Jewish 'victim' (1939–1945) ==
Würzbach's attraction to Nazism is all the more curious as Würzbach himself was, in the language of the Nazi Racial-Purity Department, "half-Jewish". This was a fact he himself denied by falsely claiming that he had been born to a different mother, whose name his father had never told him, and thus, he urged, he was of ‘true’ Aryan stock. Würzbach was eventually fired from his position at the radio-station when his final plea for clemency, petitioned to Hitler, was turned down. The director of the station, Helmuth Habersbrunner [1899-1959] wrote a number of letters in an attempt overturn Würzbach's suspension, in one such letter to a high-ranking Nazi official, Habersbrunner wrote

"When one works closely with someone for six years, one ought to have felt the Jew coming through on at least one occasion. Especially me, who can usually sniff a Jew out from a hundred metres, against the wind. I have never spotted the slightest trace of Jewish Geist. On the contrary, a true Aryan mentality."

Despite the protests, (there are a considerable number of letters and statements from colleagues trying to reverse the decision in his personnel-file) and despite Würzbach's official "Political Judgement", which claimed that Würzbach was "completely convinced of the world-beating meaning of National Socialism", he was finally dismissed in September 1940.

In 1943 the Nietzsche Society was officially banned by the Gestapo and their files were destroyed. Although he was prevented from working Würzbach maintained contact with his colleagues and managed to publish number of books, including, shortly before his dismissal, Das Vermächtnis Friedrich Nietzsches [Nietzsche's Legacy]. This was collection of Nietzsche's unpublished work, which at the time was described by Günther Lotz, spokesman for the Ministry for the People's Enlightenment and Propaganda as an "important work for our current world-view situation". Würzbach's monumental achievement, the painstaking process of assembling and cataloguing Nietzsche's Nachlass, was, however, overshadowed by his continued adherence to the biological-Nazi reading of Nietzsche.

== Post war (1945–1961) ==
Würzbach escaped prosecution by the Allies after the war. He presented himself to the commission as a victim and was officially given the political all-clear in 1946. He then worked intermittently at the Vocational College [Volkshochschule] in Munich until his death on 14 May 1961. In those final years after the war he repeatedly tried, in vain, to regain regular air-time at the radio station from which he had been dismissed. As far as his philosophy was concerned, he continued to read Nietzsche as proffering a biological-hierarchical theory; as is evident in his claim in an essay written late in 1945, that we need a "hierarchy of Man, not according to our own standards, but according to the given hierarchical and power order". Furthermore, when he republished his 1932 polemic Erkennen und Erleben [Know & Experience] in 1949, albeit with some changes and under the new title of Grundtypen des Menschen; he therewith demonstrated his lasting antipathy to, and misunderstanding of Edmund Husserl and his philosophy.

== Archival sources ==
Denazification Files
Staatsarchiv München, Akten der Spruchkammer: Miesbach 19/1866/46. Dr. Friedrich Würzbach; Rottach.
Nietzsche/Nietzsche Gesellschaft in Munich
Bayerisches Hauptstaatsarchive: Generalintendanz Bayer. Staatstheater, No. 1375.
Bayerisches Hauptstaatsarchive: Nietzsche Gesellschaft.
Personnel File from Reichsender München
Bayerische Rundfunk Historisches Archiv (BRHA): Friedrich Würzbach, RV. 16.
Letters/Documents
Bundesarchiv, Lichterfeld: Berlin (BA)
Geheim Staatarchive Preußischer Kultusministerium (GStA PK) I. HA Rep. 76 Kultusministerium, Va. Universitäten Sekt. 1 Tit. XIX.
Nietzsche Archive Weimar
Goethe-Schiller Archiv (GSA: 72)

== Bibliography ==
- Erkennen und Erleben: Der "Große Kopf" und der "Günstling der Natur". Berlin: Volksverband Der Bücherfreunde Wegweiser-Verlag, 1932.

Republished as:

- Grundtypen der Menschen: Der "Große Kopf" und der "Günstling der Natur" 1941 [Officially Censured]
- Grundtypen der Menschen: Der "Große Kopf" und der "Günstling der Natur". Bamberg: Bamberger Reiter Verlag, 1949

Other

- Ariadne: Jahrbuch der Nietzsche-Gesellschaft 1925. Ed. Friedrich Würzbach. München: 1925.
- Dionysus. München: Nietzsche Gesellschaft Verlag/ Im Musarion Verlag, 1921.
- "Nachbericht zum Wille zur Macht" in Friedrich Nietzsche: Gesammelte Werke, Musarion Ausgabe 1922-1929.
- Der Wille zur Macht, Band XIX, 1926, 403-35.
- Arbeit und Arbeiter in der neuen Gesellschaftsordnung. [Radio Broadcast], Berlin, Leipzig: Bong & Co., 1933
- Nietzsche und das deutsche Schicksal [Radio Broadcast], Berlin, Leipzig: Bong & Co., 1933
- Die Wiedergeburt des Geistes aus dem Blute in Völkischer Beobachter People's Observer - Daily Nazi Party Sponsored Newspaper: 14-Jan.-1934
- Das dionysische Lied des Deutschen in Völkischer Beobachter: 26-Jan.-1934
- Das Vermächtnis Friedrich Nietzsches in Völkischer Beobachter: 14-Nov.-1934
- Die Würdigung Friedreich Nietzsches in Völkischer Beobachter:16-May-35
- Vom Geist der Rasse [Spirit of Race] Frauenwarte 1938, Heft 20, p. 625
- Das Vermächtnis Friedrich Nietzsches. Salzburg; Leipzig: Pustet Verlag, 1940
- Nietzsche: Ein Leben in Selbstzeugnissen Briefen und Berichten. Berlin: Im Prophyläen Verlag, 1942
- Das Rohmaterial prähistorischer Silexwerkzeuge nach Vorkommen und Eigenschaften Freiburg i.B., Naturwiss.-math. Diss. v. 5. Mai 1924.
- Friedrich Würzbach & Fritz Krökel. Die Quellen unserer Kraft: Ein Lesebuch vom Ewigen Deutschen. Graz: Steirischer Verlag, 1943
- "Das Bild des Menschen" in Zwei unveröffentlichen Manuskripte aus dem Nachlaß. Ed. W.L. Hohmann. (Essen: Das Blaue Eule, 1984) pp. 13–66.
