= Apollonian and Dionysian =

Philosophical and literary concepts

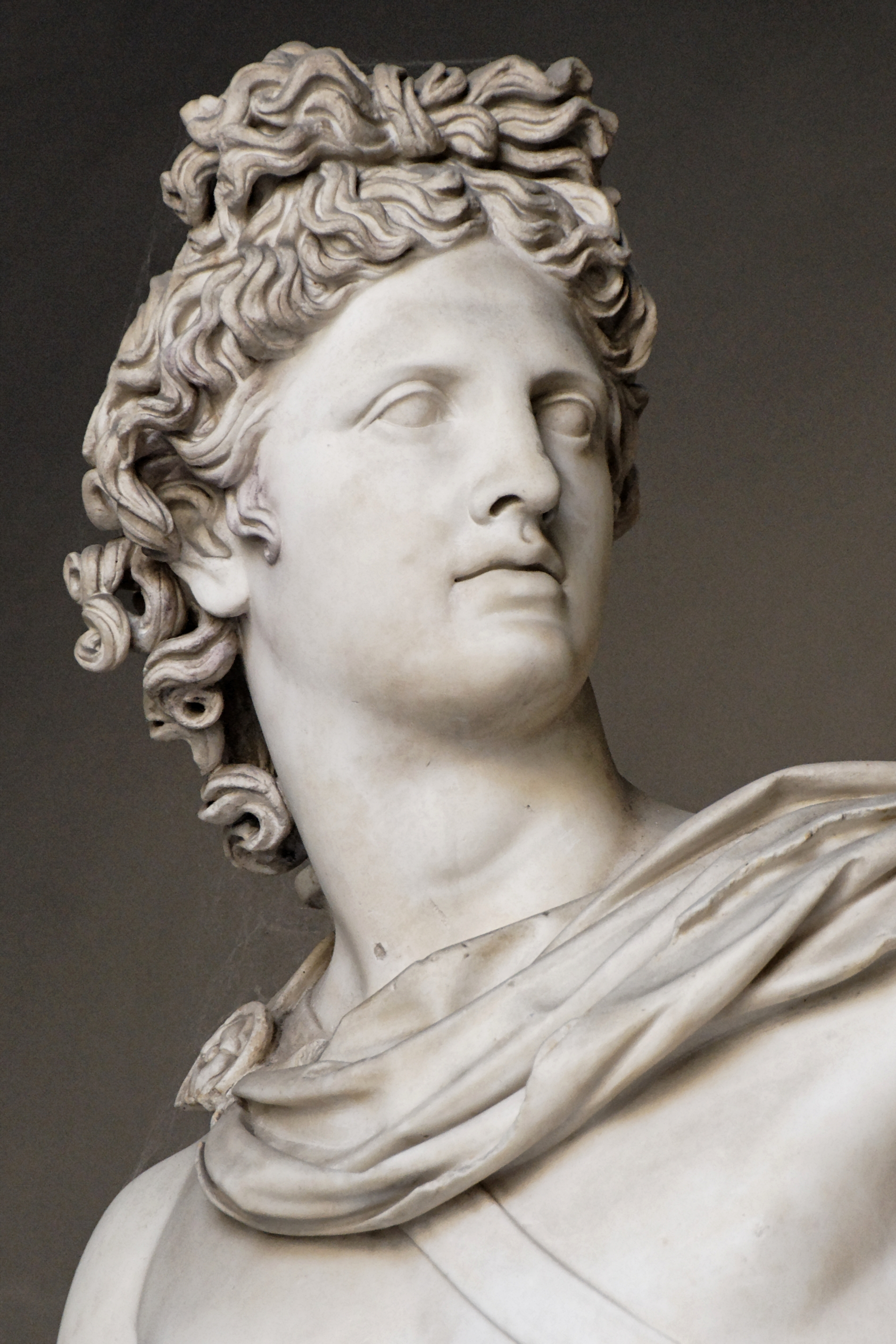
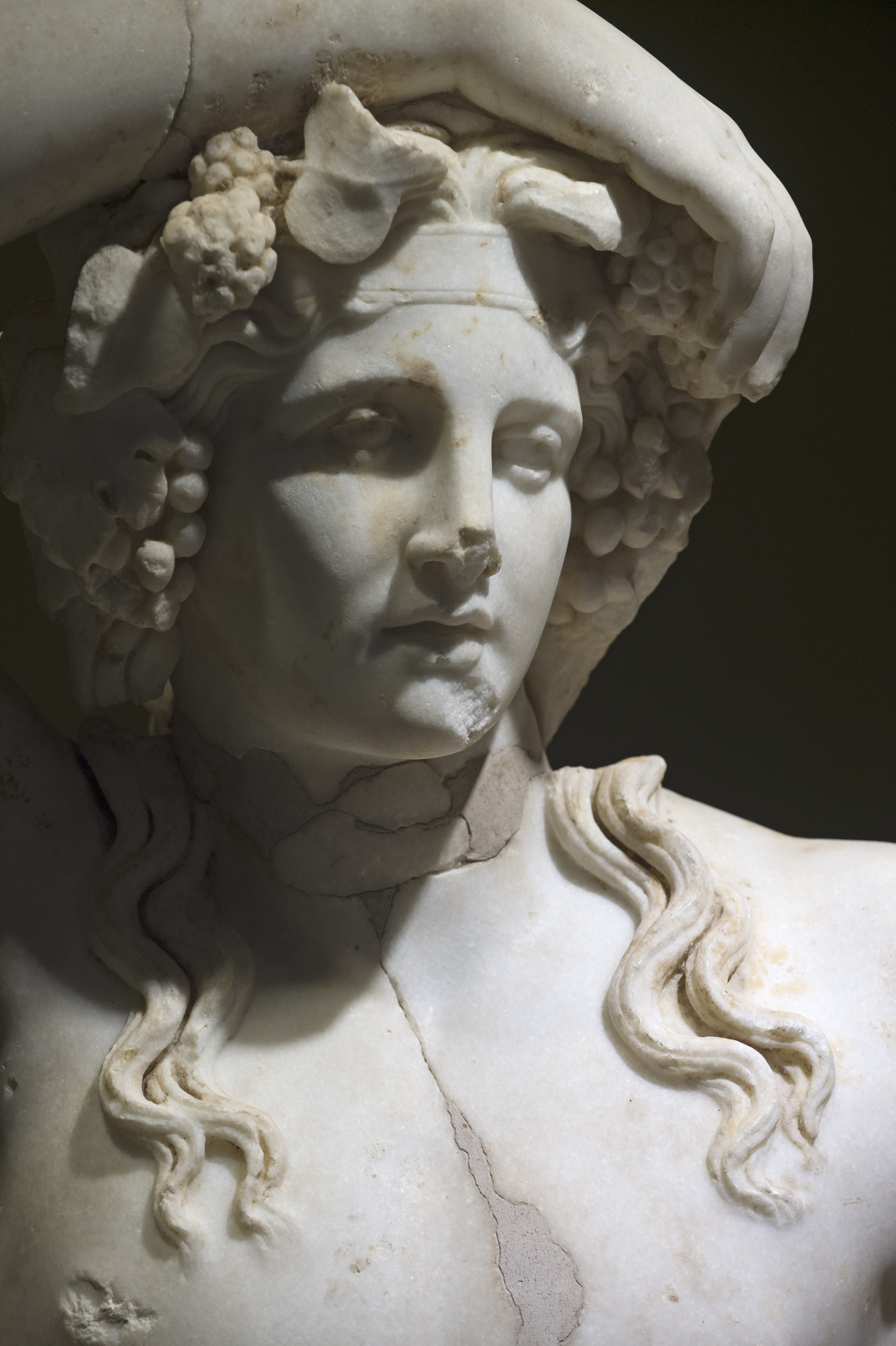
Marble statue of Apollo (left), and of Dionysus (right)

The Apollonian and the Dionysian are philosophical and literary concepts represented by a duality between the figures of Apollo and Dionysus from Greek mythology. Its popularization is widely attributed to the work The Birth of Tragedy by Friedrich Nietzsche, though the terms had already been in use prior to this, such as in the writings of poet Friedrich Hölderlin, historian Johann Joachim Winckelmann, and others. The word Dionysian occurs as early as 1608 in Edward Topsell's zoological treatise The History of Serpents. The concept has since been widely invoked and discussed within Western philosophy and literature.

In Greek mythology, Apollo and Dionysus are both sons of Zeus. Apollo, son of Leto, is the god of the sun, art, plague and disease, of rational thinking and order, and appeals to logic, prudence and purity and stands for reason. Dionysus, son of Semele, is the god of wine, dance and pleasure, of irrationality and chaos, representing passion, emotions and instincts. The ancient Greeks did not consider the two gods to be opposites or rivals, although they were often entwined by nature.

== Nietzschean usage ==
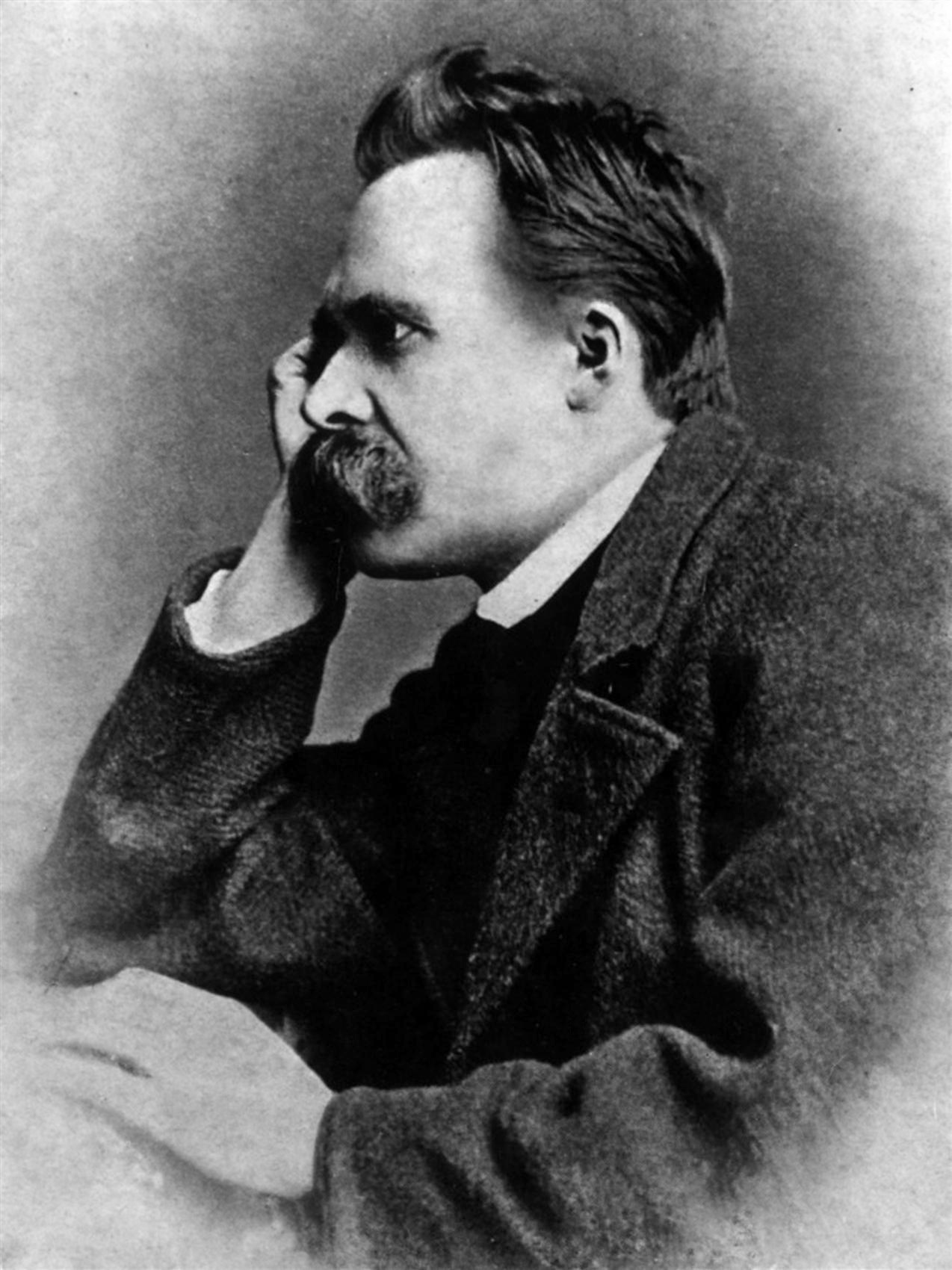
Friedrich Wilhelm Nietzsche, who popularised the Apollonian and Dionysian dialectic

Nietzsche found in classical Athenian tragedy an art form that transcended the pessimism found in the so-called wisdom of Silenus. The Greek spectators, by looking into the abyss of human suffering depicted by characters on stage, passionately and joyously affirmed life, finding it worth living. The main theme in The Birth of Tragedy is that the fusion of Dionysian and Apollonian Kunsttriebe ("artistic impulses") forms dramatic arts or tragedies. He argued that this fusion has not been achieved since the ancient Greek tragedians. Apollo represents harmony, progress, clarity, logic and the principle of individuation, whereas Dionysus represents disorder, intoxication, emotion, ecstasy and unity (hence the omission of the principle of individuation).

Nietzsche strongly distinguishes his Dionysus from the Dionysus of the Orphic tradition, which he considers a later corruption of the original Dionysian force. To him in the pre-Homeric world, Dionysian civilisations were marked by barbarism, cruelty, and ecstatic sexual excess, unrestrained by rational or moral principles. Nietzsche associates this period with unmediated life-affirmation, where violence and eroticism intertwined as expressions of raw vitality. The Orphics, overwhelmed by anxiety toward this unmitigated savagery, reacted by turning away from the physical world and abstracting their gods into metaphysical ideas. In doing so, they transformed Dionysus from a figure of visceral power into a god of suffering and redemption and, in parallel, converted man from a being of flesh and instincts into a soul burdened with guilt and the need for purification.

Nietzsche criticises this Orphic reinterpretation as an early decline in Greek spiritual health, arguing that it marked the beginning of an anti-life tendency that would later manifest in Platonism and Christianity. He further argues that Socrates and Euripides continued the Orphic trajectory, replacing instinct, myth, and artistic frenzy with rationalism, dialectic, and moral didacticism. By doing so, they undermined the ecstatic and violent balance of Apollonian and Dionysian forces, ultimately leading to the decline of Greek tragedy.

Nietzsche used these two forces because, for him, the world of mind and order on one side, and passion and chaos on the other, formed principles that were fundamental to the Greek culture: the Apollonian a dreaming state, full of illusions; and Dionysian a state of intoxication, representing the liberation of instincts and dissolution of boundaries. In this mould, a man appears as the satyr. He is the horror of the annihilation of the principle of individuality and at the same time someone who delights in its destruction.

In this state one enriches everything out of one's own fullness: whatever one sees, whatever wills is seen swelled, taut, strong, overloaded with strength. A man in this state transforms things until they mirror his power—until they are reflections of his perfection. This having to transform into perfection is—art.

Nietzsche is adamant that the works of Aeschylus and Sophocles represent the apex of artistic creation, the true realisation of tragedy; it is with Euripides, that tragedy begins its Untergang (literally 'going under' or 'downward-way;' meaning decline, deterioration, downfall, death, etc.). Nietzsche objects to Euripides' use of Socratic rationalism and morality in his tragedies, claiming that the infusion of ethics and reason robs tragedy of its foundation, namely the fragile balance of the Dionysian and Apollonian. Socrates emphasised reason to such a degree that he diffused the value of myth and suffering to human knowledge. Plato continued along this path in his dialogues, and the modern world eventually inherited reason at the expense of artistic impulses found in the Apollonian and Dionysian dichotomy. He notes that without the Apollonian, the Dionysian lacks the form and structure to make a coherent piece of art, and without the Dionysian, the Apollonian lacks the necessary vitality and passion. Only the fertile interplay of these two forces brought together as an art represented the best of Greek tragedy.

An example of the impact of this idea can be seen in the book Patterns of Culture, where the anthropologist Ruth Benedict acknowledges Nietzschean opposites of "Apollonian" and "Dionysian" as the stimulus for her thoughts about Native American cultures. Carl Jung has written extensively on the dichotomy in Psychological Types. Michel Foucault commented that his own book Madness and Civilization should be read "under the sun of the great Nietzschean inquiry". Here Foucault referenced Nietzsche's description of the birth and death of tragedy and his explanation that the subsequent tragedy of the Western world was the refusal of the tragic and, with that, refusal of the sacred. The painter Mark Rothko was influenced by Nietzsche's view of tragedy presented in The Birth of Tragedy.

== Later usage ==
=== Continental philosophy ===
Nietzsche's idea has been interpreted as an expression of fragmented consciousness or existential instability by a variety of modern and post-modern writers, especially Martin Heidegger, Michel Foucault, and Gilles Deleuze. According to Peter Sloterdijk, the Dionysian and the Apollonian form a dialectic; they are contrasting, but Nietzsche does not mean one to be valued more than the other. Truth being primordial pain, our existential being is determined by the Dionysian/Apollonian dialectic.

Extending the use of the Apollonian and Dionysian onto an argument on interaction between the mind and physical environment, Abraham Akkerman has pointed to masculine and feminine features of city form.

=== Ruth Benedict ===
Anthropologist Ruth Benedict used the terms to characterize cultures that value restraint and modesty (Apollonian) and ostentatiousness and excess (Dionysian). An example of an Apollonian culture in Benedict's analysis was the Zuñi people as opposed to the Dionysian Kwakiutl people. The theme was developed by Benedict in her main work Patterns of Culture.

=== Albert Szent-Györgyi ===
Albert Szent-Györgyi, who wrote that "a discovery must be, by definition, at variance with existing knowledge", divided scientists into two categories: the Apollonians and the Dionysians. He called scientific dissenters, who explored "the fringes of knowledge", Dionysians. He wrote, "In science the Apollonian tends to develop established lines to perfection, while the Dionysian rather relies on intuition and is more likely to open new, unexpected alleys for research...The future of mankind depends on the progress of science, and the progress of science depends on the support it can find. Support mostly takes the form of grants, and the present methods of distributing grants unduly favor the Apollonian".

=== Camille Paglia ===
American humanities scholar Camille Paglia writes about the Apollonian and Dionysian in her 1990 bestseller Sexual Personae. The broad outline of her concept has roots in Nietzschean discourse, an admitted influence, although Paglia's ideas diverge significantly.

The Apollonian and Dionysian concepts comprise a dichotomy that serves as the basis of Paglia's theory of art and culture. For Paglia, the Apollonian is light and structured while the Dionysian is dark and chthonic (she prefers Chthonic to Dionysian throughout the book, arguing that the latter concept has become all but synonymous with hedonism and is inadequate for her purposes, declaring that "the Dionysian is no picnic"). The Chthonic is associated with females, wild/chaotic nature, and unconstrained sex/procreation. In contrast, the Apollonian is associated with males, clarity, celibacy and/or homosexuality, rationality/reason, and solidity, along with the goal of oriented progress: "Everything great in western civilization comes from struggle against our origins".

She argues that there is a biological basis to the Apollonian/Dionysian dichotomy, writing: "The quarrel between Apollo and Dionysus is the quarrel between the higher cortex and the older limbic and reptilian brains". Moreover, Paglia attributes all the progress of human civilization to masculinity revolting against the Chthonic forces of nature, and turning instead to the Apollonian trait of ordered creation. The Dionysian is a force of chaos and destruction, which is the overpowering and alluring chaotic state of wild nature. Rejection of—or combat with—Chthonianism by socially constructed Apollonian virtues accounts for the historical dominance of men (including asexual and homosexual men; and childless and/or lesbian-leaning women) in science, literature, arts, technology, and politics. As an example, Paglia states: "The male orientation of classical Athens was inseparable from its genius. Athens became great not despite but because of its misogyny".

== See also ==
- "Cygnus X-1 Book II: Hemispheres", a song by Canadian rock band Rush based in part on the concept.
- The Decline of the West
- Faust
- Light and dark side of the Force
- Logocentrism
  - Phallogocentrism
- Master-morality and slave-morality
- Yin and yang

== Sources ==
- Nietzsche, Friedrich Wilhelm (1967), Colli, Giorgio; Montinari, Mazzino (eds.), Kritische Gesamtausgabe Werke, vol. II, de Gruyter
- Nietzsche, Friedrich Wilhelm (1980), Colli, Giorgio; Montinari, Mazzino (eds.), Kritische Studienausgabe, vol. I, de Gruyter
