= Sossio Giametta =

Italian philosopher, translator, and journalist

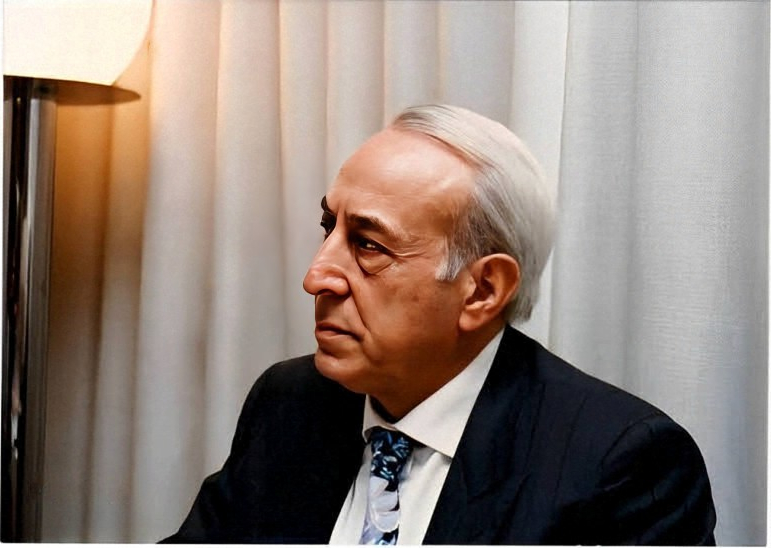
Sossio Giametta

Sossio Arturo Giametta (20 November 1929 – 15 January 2024) was an Italian philosopher, translator and journalist.

== Biography ==
After graduating in law, towards the end of the 1950s, Giametta met Giorgio Colli and Mazzino Montinari. He worked with them for four years, between Florence and Weimar, on a seminal critical edition of Friedrich Nietzsche's works, becoming one of the greatest contributors to the dissemination of Nietzsche's thought in Italy.

He has translated all the works and most important posthumous writings of Nietzsche, of whom he is considered one of Italy's foremost experts. Additionally, he has translated nearly all of Schopenhauer's works and crucial texts by Caesar, Spinoza, Goethe, Freud, and Max Stirner.

He also wrote several novels and short stories, marked by strong philosophical and moral value. This trait led Italian writer Raffaele La Capria to describe Giametta's prose as an astonishing encounter of literature and philosophy. As a journalist and essayist, he collaborated with several Italian newspapers, including Corriere della Sera, La Repubblica, and Il Giornale.

Over the years, particularly since his 'Trilogy of Essentialism' (consisting of Bue squartato, L'oro prezioso dell'essere, and Cortocircuiti), Giametta developed his own philosophical system. He described it as follows: "Essentialism [...] is a new philosophy, based exclusively on nature, understood in its two aspects, both as naturans and as naturata. Essentialism describes the human condition as determined by the combination of two heterogeneous elements: the essence of all that exists, which is divine, and the conditions of existence, which are often all too diabolical. The balancing of these two elements, different in each individual, explains the eternal reasons why one believes or disbelieves, affirms or denies life, is optimistic or pessimistic."

Sossio Giametta died on January 15, 2024, at the age of 94, in Brussels, where he had moved in 1965 and worked for 30 years at the Council of Ministers of the European Union.

== Main Works ==
=== As a translator ===
- F. Nietzsche, Frammenti postumi 1887 - 1888, Adelphi 1971, ISBN 978-88-459-0024-2.
- F. Nietzsche, Umano, troppo umano (Vol. 1), Adelphi 1979, ISBN 978-88-459-0390-8.
- F. Nietzsche, Umano, troppo umano (Vol. 2), Adelphi 1981, ISBN 978-88-459-0464-6.
- F. Nietzsche, Scritti su Wagner, Adelphi 1979, ISBN 978-88-459-0385-4.
- F. Nietzsche, La nascita della tragedia, Adelphi 1978, ISBN 978-88-459-0199-7.
- F. Nietzsche, Sull'utilità e il danno della storia per la vita, Adelphi 1974, ISBN 978-88-459-0165-2.
- F. Nietzsche, Così parlò Zarathustra, BUR 1985, ISBN 978-88-17-16534-1.
- F. Nietzsche, Schopenhauer come educatore, BUR 2004, ISBN 978-88-17-00154-0.
- F. Nietzsche, La gaia scienza-Idilli di Messina, BUR 2004, ISBN 978-88-17-17329-2.
- F. Nietzsche, Verità e menzogna: La visione dionisiaca del mondo, La filosofia nell'epoca tragica dei greci, Su verità e menzogna in senso extramorale, BUR 2006, ISBN 978-88-17-01059-7.
- A. Schopenhauer, I due problemi fondamentali dell'etica. Testo tedesco a fronte, Bompiani 2019, ISBN 978-88-301-0101-2.
- A. Schopenhauer, Controstoria della filosofia, La nave di Teseo 2023, ISBN 978-88-346-1421-1.
- B. Spinoza, Etica, Bollati Boringhieri 2021, ISBN 978-88-339-3956-8.
- J. W. Goethe, Massime e riflessioni, BUR 2013, ISBN 978-88-17-06332-6.
- S. Freud, L'avvenire di un'illusione e Il disagio della civiltà. Ediz. integrale, New Compton 2016, ISBN 978-88-541-9279-9.
- M. Stirner, L'unico e la sua proprietà. Testo tedesco a fronte, Bompiani 2018, ISBN 978-88-452-9707-6.

=== As an author ===
- Nietzsche il poeta, il moralista, il filosofo (preface by Claudio Magris), Garzanti, Milano 1991, ISBN 978-88-11-47370-1.
- Palomar, Han, Candaule e altri. Scritti di critica letteraria, Palomar, Bari 1992, ISBN 88-7600-092-5.
- Nietzsche e i suoi interpreti. Oltre il nichilismo, Marsilio, Venezia 1995, ISBN 978-88-317-6185-7.
- Erminio o della fede. Dialogo con Nietzsche di un suo interprete. Spirali, Milano 1997, ISBN 978-88-7770-473-3.
- Saggi nietzschiani, La Città del Sole, Napoli 1998, ISBN 978-88-86521-93-2.
- Hamann nel giudizio di Hegel, Goethe e Croce, Bibliopolis, Napoli 2005, ISBN 978-88-7088-491-3.
- Tre conferenze. Il mondo, Schopenhauer, Nietzsche, Palomar, Bari 2005, ISBN 978-88-88872-96-4.
- Madonna con bambina e altri racconti morali, BUR, Milano 2006, ISBN 978-88-17-00954-6.
- Commento allo Zarathustra, Mondadori Bruno, Milano 2006, ISBN 978-88-424-9804-9.
- Nietzsche. Il pensiero come la dinamite, BUR, Milano 2007, ISBN 978-88-17-01502-8.
- I pazzi di Dio. Croce, Heidegger, Schopenhauer, Nietzsche e altri, La Città del Sole, Napoli 2008, ISBN 978-88-7984-848-0.
- Schopenhauer e Nietzsche, Il Prato, Padova 2008, ISBN 978-88-6336-028-8.
- Eterodossie crociane, Bibliopolis, Napoli 2009, ISBN 978-88-7088-577-4.
- Il volo di Icaro. Elzeviri filosofici, Il Prato, Padova 2009, ISBN 978-88-6336-055-4.
- Introduzione a Nietzsche. Opera per opera, BUR, Milano 2009, ISBN 978-88-11-67257-9.
- Il bue squartato e altri macelli. La dolce filosofia (con Giuseppe Girgenti), Mursia, Milano 2012, ISBN 978-88-425-4958-1.
- L'oro prezioso dell'essere. Saggi filosofici, Mursia, Milano 2013, ISBN 978-88-425-5201-7.
- Cortocircuiti, Mursia, Milano 2014, ISBN 978-88-425-5334-2.
- Adelphoe, Unicopli, Milano 2015, ISBN 978-88-400-1805-8.
- Il dio lontano, Castelvecchi, Roma 2016, ISBN 978-88-6944-678-8
- Tre centauri, Saletta dell'Uva, Napoli 2016, ISBN 978-88-6133-139-6.
- Ritratti di dodici filosofi, Saletta dell'Uva, Napoli 2017, ISBN 978-88-6133-014-6.
- Una vacanza attiva, OlioOfficina, Milano 2017, ISBN 978-88-94887-02-0.
- Grandi problemi risolti in piccoli spazi. Codicillo dell'essenzialismo (postface by Marco Lanterna), Bompiani, Milano 2017, ISBN 978-88-452-9396-2.
- Colli, Montinari e Nietzsche, BookTime, Milano 2018, ISBN 978-88-6218-149-5.
- Capricci napoletani. Pagine di diario (edited by Marco Lanterna), OlioOfficina, Milano 2018, ISBN 978-88-94887-16-7.
- Il colpo di timpano, Saletta dell'Uva, Napoli 2019, ISBN 978-88-6133-129-7.
- Contromano, BookTime, Milano 2019, ISBN 978-88-6218-313-0.
- Caleidoscopio filosofico. L'eterno ritorno nel Nietzsche di Heidegger e altri saggi, Mimesis 2022, ISBN 978-88-575-8078-4.

== Bibliography ==
- Domenico Fazio e Fabio Ciracì (eds), La passione della conoscenza. Studi in onore di Sossio Giametta, Pensa Multimedia, Lecce, 2010.
- Marco Lanterna, Contributo alla critica di Sossio (in Giametta, Capricci napoletani, OlioOfficina, Milano 2018).
- Marco Lanterna (a cura di), Il mago del Sud. Ritratti di Sossio Giametta, OlioOfficina, Milano 2022.
- "Sossio Giametta. Più che un traduttore", Rai Cultura, https://www.raicultura.it/filosofia/articoli/2021/10/Sossio-Giametta-piu-che-un-traduttore--90a21f90-98e7-4969-9888-f7ddf320d993.html

== Related entries ==
- Friedrich Nietzsche
- Arthur Schopenhauer
- Giorgio Colli
- Mazzino Montinari
