= Amor fati =

Latin phrase meaning 'love of fate'

Amor fati is a Latin phrase that may be translated as love of fate or love of one's fate. It is used to describe an attitude in which one sees everything that happens in one's life, including suffering and loss, as necessary.

Amor fati often is associated with what Friedrich Nietzsche called eternal recurrence, the idea that everything recurs infinitely over an infinite period of time. From this he developed a desire to be willing to live exactly the same life over and over for all eternity ("long for nothing more fervently than this ultimate eternal confirmation and seal").

== Nietzsche ==
The concept of amor fati has been linked to Epictetus. It also has been linked to the writings of Marcus Aurelius, who did not use these words (he wrote in Greek, not Latin). However, it found its most explicit expression in Nietzsche, who made love of fate central to his philosophy. In "Why I Am So Clever" (Ecce Homo, section 10), he wrote:

My formula for greatness in a human being is amor fati: that one wants nothing to be different, not forward, not backward, not in all eternity. Not merely bear what is necessary, still less conceal it—all idealism is mendacity in the face of what is necessary—but love it.

The phrase is used elsewhere in Nietzsche's writings, and it is representative of the general outlook on life that he articulates in aphorism 276 of The Gay Science:

I want to learn more and more to see as beautiful what is necessary in things; then I shall be one of those who makes things beautiful. Amor fati: let that be my love henceforth! I do not want to wage war against what is ugly. I do not want to accuse; I do not even want to accuse those who accuse. Looking away shall be my only negation. And all in all and on the whole: some day I wish to be only a Yes-sayer.

Nietzsche in this context refers to the "Yes-sayer", not in a political or social sense, but as a person who is capable of uncompromising acceptance of reality.

R.J. Hollingdale, who translated Thus Spoke Zarathustra into English, argued that Nietzsche's idea of amor fati originated in the Lutheran Pietism of his childhood.

=== Suffering ===
Nietzsche's love of fate naturally leads him to confront the reality of suffering in a radical way. For to love that which is necessary demands that we love the bad along with the good and that we view the two as inextricably linked. In section 3 of the preface of The Gay Science, he wrote:

Only great pain is the ultimate liberator of the spirit…I doubt that such pain makes us "better"; but I know that it makes us more profound.

Nietzsche does not promote suffering as a good in itself, but rather as a precondition for good. A "single moment" of good justifies an eternity of bad, but one extreme cannot have meaning without the other. In The Will to Power, he wrote:

For nothing is self-sufficient, neither in us ourselves nor in things; and if our soul has trembled with happiness and sounded like a harp string just once, all eternity was needed to produce this one event—and in this single moment of affirmation all eternity was called good, redeemed, justified, and affirmed.

== Modern development ==
Cyril O'Regan stated that with "all the bravado about amor fati we sometimes get the impression in reading [Nietzsche] that he is expecting as much our pity as our admiration. Still, the aphorism is powerful, and it is powerful not only because it is scintillating in its expression, but because it is experientially apt."

=== Albert Camus ===
In his 1942 essay The Myth of Sisyphus, the French philosopher Albert Camus explores ideas similar to Nietzsche's ideas. According to Camus' philosophy of absurdism, the human condition is analogous to the curse of Sisyphus, who in ancient Greek mythology was condemned to eternally repeat the task of pushing a boulder up a hill only to watch it roll back down again. Like Nietzsche, Camus concludes that happiness is only possible when the essential meaninglessness of one's existence is both acknowledged and positively affirmed.

In "Return to Tipasa" (1952), Camus wrote:

What else can I desire than to exclude nothing and to learn how to braid with white thread and black thread a single cord stretched to the breaking-point?

Camus, like Nietzsche, held his embrace of fate to be central to his philosophy. Summarizing his general view of life in the above work, Camus spoke of: "a will to live without rejecting anything of life, which is the virtue I honor most in this world."

== See also ==
- Agonism – Political theory emphasizing the positive aspects of conflict
- Destiny – Predetermined course of events
- Eternal return – Concept of perpetual recurrence of time
- Fatalism – Philosophical doctrine on the subjugation of all events to fate
- Nietzschean affirmation – Concept in Friedrich Nietzsche's philosophy
- Thus Spoke Zarathustra – Philosophical work by Friedrich Nietzsche
