= Emanuele Severino =

Italian philosopher (1929–2020)

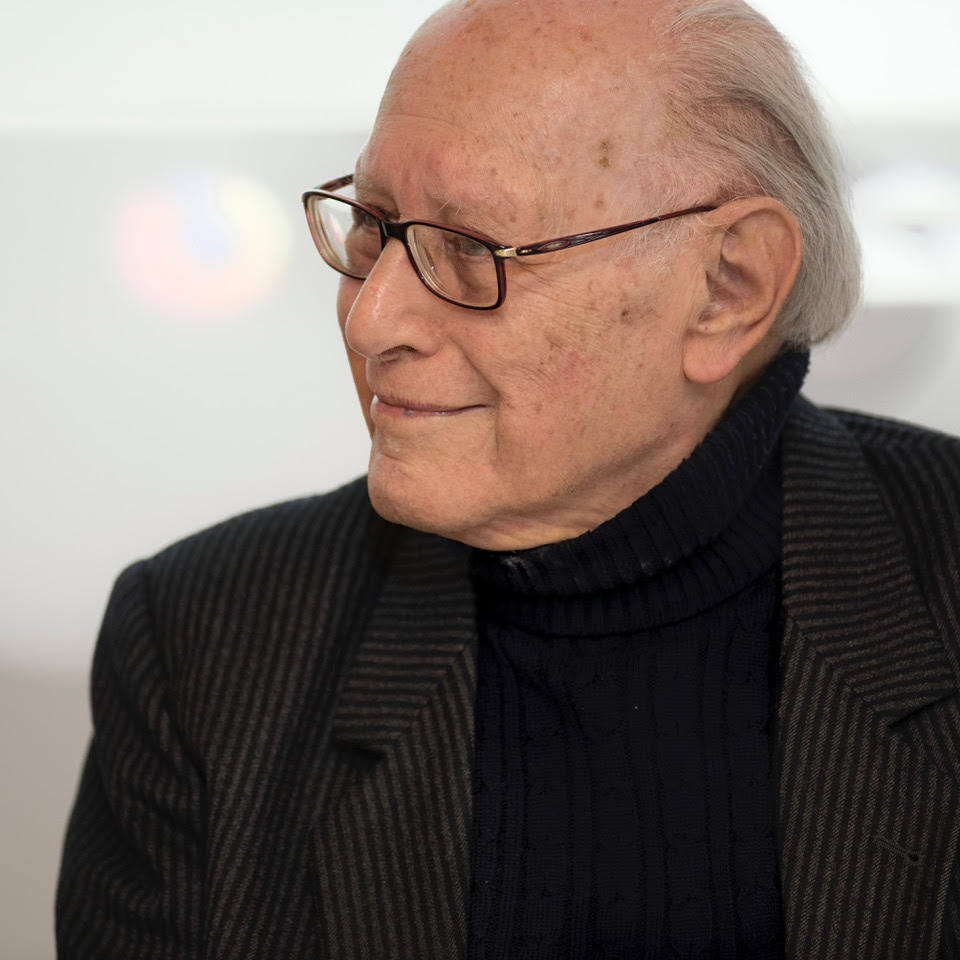
- Severino in 2019
- Born: 26 February 1929; Brescia, Kingdom of Italy
- Died: 17 January 2020 (aged 90); Brescia, Italy
- Occupations: Philosopher; academic

Emanuele Severino (26 February 1929 – 17 January 2020) was an Italian philosopher.

== Biography ==
Severino studied at the University of Brescia and graduated at the University of Pavia under Gustavo Bontadini with the first Italian dissertation on Martin Heidegger and the Metaphysics.

Severino's interest for philosophy started thanks to his brother, who had died in the Alpine Corps during the last war, and had been a student at the Normal School in Pisa, having Gentile, Armando Carlini, Luigi Russo, and Calogero as teachers.

Subsequently, Severino broke publicly from Bontadini in 1970 while both were members of faculty of the Università Cattolica del Sacro Cuore in Milan. A student of his as a young man at the Università Cattolica del Sacro Cuore was Cardinal Angelo Scola, who later served as Archbishop of Milan.

Severino spent a number of years on the faculty of the University of Venice as well.

Because of his original philosophical position, the so-called neoparmenidism, Severino was claimed to be "a giant" and "the only philosopher who in the 20th century can be compared to Heidegger" (Massimo Cacciari).

In 1970, the Congregation for the Doctrine of the Faith ruled that Severino's ideas were not compatible with Christianity as the basis of Severino's belief in "the eternity of all being", a belief said to eliminate a Creator God.

Severino received from the President of the Italian Republic the "Golden medal of the Republic for culture merits" (Medaglia d’oro della Repubblica per i Benemeriti della Cultura). In April 2019, Severino was interviewed by the then Italian premier Giuseppe Conte who defined him a focal point of the theoretical philosophy at an international level.

Severino died in 2020.

== The eternity of all beings ==
Severino confronts an ancient problem, rooted in Plato and Aristotle and taken up in the modern era by Heidegger, that of Being. For Severino, all the philosophies which have been formed up to now are characterised by one fundamental error, faith in the Greek sense of becoming. Indeed, since the ancient Greeks, a being (or anything which is) has been considered as coming from nothing, granted existence temporarily, and then returning into nothing. Severino, reflecting on the absolute opposition between Being and non-Being, given that between the two terms there is nothing in common, considers it evident that being can only remain constantly unchanging, not being changed by anything which is not itself. Thus, since Being is the totality of what exists, there can be nothing else besides it endowed with existence (Severino thereby refutes the concept of ontological difference as put forward by Heidegger). For Severino, therefore, the entire history of philosophy is based on the erroneous conviction that Being can become nothing.

== Notable students ==
Among his notable students there were the following Italian philosophers: Umberto Galimberti, Luigi Ruggiu (born 1939), Carmelo Vigna (born 1940), Mario Ruggenini (1940–2021), Salvatore Natoli (born 1942), Italo Valent (1944–2003), Luigi Vero Tarca (born 1947), Luigi Lentini, Giorgio Brianese (1958–2021), Massimo Donà (born 1952).

== Criticism ==
Martin Heidegger, while talking with Cornelio Fabro in Rome, said about Severino's "Returning to Parmenides" ("Ritornare a Parmenide"): "Severino has immobilized my Dasein!" Even much earlier, some Heideggerian working notes testify how Martin Heidegger followed the very young Severino (from a study by Francesco Alfieri and Friedrich von Herrmann). Severino was criticized by the mathematician and logician Piergiorgio Odifreddi, in response to a critical assessment by Severino himself of one of Odifreddi's works, namely the introduction written for the Italian edition of Bertrand Russell's The ABC of Relativity where a number of philosophers (including Severino himself, Heidegger, Croce and Deleuze) were quoted, according to Severino in an incongruous and "bulk" manner; instead, the mathematician accused Severino of not considering the importance of science (as the Italian idealists already had done, such as Croce and Gentile), unlike great philosophers of the past who had studied certain theories in depth (giving the example of Kant, Nietzsche and Descartes, a mathematician himself).

In the dialogue between Severino and Alessandro Di Chiara Beyond Man and Beyond God ("Oltre l'uomo e oltre Dio ", 2002), the philosophy of necessity is contrasted with the philosophy of freedom. Aldo Stella, author of numerous works on theoretical philosophy, has addressed relevant criticisms of his thought, which find expression, in particular, in two volumes devoted to The Original Structure ("La struttura originaria"). Among the non-academic thinkers who have criticized Severino is Marco Pellegrino, who reproaches him for his incorrect use of the principle of non-contradiction.

According to Father Battista Mondin, Severino arbitrarily identified being with entity, attributing to the latter the exclusive properties of the former, including eternity and immutability. Everyday experience contradicts this thesis.

According to the philosopher Sossio Giametta, Severino tragically posed as a fake mystic who lived in a perpetual state of ecstasy, describing in dozens of books the joyful and glorious Being that has nothing to fear from its opposite, the becoming and nothingness.

According to the literary critic Alfonso Berardinelli, Severino merely reproposed the usual thesis of being and becoming as mere appearance, placing himself above all thinkers of the Western tradition.

== Bibliography ==
Not many of Severino's works have been translated. One of his crucial works has been translated into German: Vom Wesen des Nihilismus, and into English as The Essence of Nihilism.

- La struttura originaria, Brescia, La Scuola, 1958. Nuova edizione, con modifiche e una Introduzione 1979, Milano, Adelphi, 1981. (English translation 2025: The Original Structure)
- Per un rinnovamento nella interpretazione della filosofia fichtiana, Brescia, La Scuola, 1960.
- Studi di filosofia della prassi, Milano, Vita e pensiero, 1963; nuova ediz. ampliata, Milano, Adelphi, 1984.
- Ritornare a Parmenide, in «Rivista di filosofia neoscolastica», LVI [1964], n. 2, pp. 137–175; poi in Essenza del nichilismo, Brescia, Paideia, 1972, pp. 13–66; nuova edizione ampliata, Milano, Adelphi, 1982, pp. 19–61.
- Essenza del nichilismo. Saggi, Brescia, Paideia, 1972; seconda edizione ampliata, Milano, Adelphi, 1982.
- Vom Wesen des Nihilismus, Stuttgart, Klett-Cotta, 1983, Translation by Magda Oschwald-Di Felice.
- Gli abitatori del tempo. Cristianesimo, marxismo, tecnica, Roma, Armando, 1978; nuova edizione ampliata, ivi, 1981.
- Téchne. Le radici della violenza, Milano, Rusconi, 1979; seconda edizione, ivi, 1988; nuova edizione ampliata, Milano, Rizzoli, 2002.
- Legge e caso, Milano, Adelphi, 1979.
- Destino della necessità. Katà tò chreòn, Milano, Adelphi, 1980; nuova edizione, senza modifiche sostanziali, ivi, 1999.
- A Cesare e a Dio, Milano, Rizzoli, 1983; nuova ediz., ivi, 2007.
- La strada, Milano, Rizzoli, 1983; nuova ediz., ivi, 2008.
- La filosofia antica, Milano, Rizzoli, 1984; nuova ediz. ampliata, ivi, 2004.
- La filosofia moderna, Milano, Rizzoli, 1984; nuova ediz. ampliata, ivi, 2004.
- Il parricidio mancato, Milano, Adelphi, 1985.
- La filosofia contemporanea, Milano, Rizzoli, 1986; nuova ediz. ampliata, ivi, 2004.
- Traduzione e interpretazione dell’Orestea di Eschilo, Milano, Rizzoli, 1985.
- La tendenza fondamentale del nostro tempo, Milano, Adelphi, 1988; nuova ediz., ivi, 2008.
- Il giogo. Alle origini della ragione: Eschilo, Milano, Adelphi, 1989.
- La filosofia futura, Milano, Rizzoli, 1989; nuova ediz. ampliata, ivi, 2005.
- Il nulla e la poesia. Alla fine dell’età della tecnica: Leopardi, Milano, Rizzoli, 1990; nuova ediz., ivi, 2005.
- Filosofia. Lo sviluppo storico e le fonti, Firenze, Sansoni, 3 voll.
- Oltre il linguaggio, Milano, Adelphi, 1992.
- La guerra, Milano, Rizzoli, 1992.
- La bilancia. Pensieri sul nostro tempo, Milano, Rizzoli, 1992.
- Il declino del capitalismo, Milano, Rizzoli, 1993; nuova ediz., ivi, 2007.
- Sortite. Piccoli scritti sui rimedi (e la gioia), Milano, Rizzoli, 1994.
- Pensieri sul Cristianesimo, Milano, Rizzoli, 1995; nuov ediz., ivi, 2010.
- Tautótēs, Milano, Adelphi, 1995.
- La filosofia dai Greci al nostro tempo, Milano, Rizzoli, 1996.
- La follia dell'angelo, Milano, Rizzoli, 1997; nuova ediz., Milano, Mimesis, 2006.
- Cosa arcana e stupenda. L’Occidente e Leopardi, Milano, Rizzoli, 1998; nuova ediz., ivi, 2006.
- Il destino della tecnica, Milano, Rizzoli, 1998; nuova ediz., ivi, 2009.
- La buona fede, Milano, Rizzoli, 1999.
- L’anello del ritorno, Milano, Adelphi, 1999.
- Crisi della tradizione occidentale, Milano, Marinotti, 1999.
- La legna e la cenere. Discussioni sul significato dell'esistenza, Milano, Rizzoli, 2000.
- Il mio scontro con la Chiesa, Milano, Rizzoli, 2001.
- La Gloria, Milano, Adelphi, 2001.
- Oltre l’uomo e oltre Dio, con Alessandro Di Chiara, Genova, Il melangolo, 2002.
- Lezioni sulla politica, Milano, Marinotti, 2002.
- Tecnica e architettura, Milano, Cortina, 2003.
- Dall'Islam a Prometeo, Milano, Rizzoli, 2003.
- Fondamento della contraddizione, Milano, Adelphi, 2005.
- Nascere, e altri problemi della coscienza religiosa, Milano, Rizzoli, 2005.
- La natura dell'embrione, Milano, Rizzoli, 2005.
- Il muro di pietra. Sul tramonto della tradizione filosofica, Milano, Rizzoli, 2006.
- L'identità della follia. Lezioni veneziane, a cura di Giorgio Brianese, Giulio Goggi, Ines Testoni, Milano, Rizzoli, 2007.
- Oltrepassare, Milano, Adelphi, 2007.
- Dialogo su Etica e Scienza (con Edoardo Boncinelli), 2008, Editrice San Raffaele, Milano.
- Immortalità e destino, Milano, Rizzoli, 2008.
- La buona fede, Milano, Rizzoli, 2008.
- L'etica del capitalismo, Milano, Albo Versorio, 2008.
- Verità, volontà, destino, con un saggio di M. Donà, Milano-Udine, Mimesis, 2008 (con due CD audio).
- L'identità del destino, Milano, Rizzoli, 2009.
- Il diverso come icona del male, Bollati Boringhieri, 2009.
- Democrazia, tecnica, capitalismo, Morcelliana, 2009.
- Discussioni intorno al senso della verità, Pisa, Edizioni ETS, 2009.
- La guerra e il mortale, a cura di Luca Taddio, con un saggio di Giorgio Brianese, Milano-Udine, Mimesis, 2010 (con due CD audio).
- Macigni e spirito di gravità, Milano, Rizzoli, 2010.
- L'intima mano, Milano, Adelphi, 2010.
- Il mio ricordo degli eterni, Rizzoli, 2011.
- La morte e la terra, Milano, Adelphi, 2011.
- The Essence of Nihilism, London-New York, Verso Books, 2016.
- Il futuro della filosofia, a cura di Riccardo Rita, Roma, Armando Curcio Editore, 2021.
