= The Will to Power (manuscript) =

1901 book supposedly written by Friedrich Nietzsche

The Will to Power (German: Der Wille zur Macht) is a book of notes drawn from the literary remains (or Nachlass) of the philosopher Friedrich Nietzsche by his sister Elisabeth Förster-Nietzsche and Peter Gast (Heinrich Köselitz). The title derived from a work that Nietzsche himself had considered writing. The work was first translated into English by Anthony M. Ludovici in 1910, and it has since seen several other translations and publications.

== Background ==
After Nietzsche's breakdown in 1889, and the passing of control over his literary estate to his sister Elisabeth Förster-Nietzsche, Nietzsche's friend Heinrich Köselitz, also known as Peter Gast, conceived the notion of publishing selections from his notebooks, using one of Nietzsche's simpler outlines as a guide to their arrangement. As he explained to Elisabeth on November 8, 1893:

Given that the original title appears as: The Antichrist. Revaluation of All Values (and therefore not 'The first book of the revaluation of all values'), you may think that your brother at the time of his incipient madness, thought the book completed. ... Notwithstanding, the consequences of this revaluation must also be explicitly illustrated in the field of morality, philosophy, politics. No one today is able to imagine such consequences – that's why the vast preparations by your brother, the other three books of the Revaluation, must be ordered according to my suggestion and gathered in a kind of system.

Between 1894 and 1926, Elisabeth arranged the publication of the twenty volume Großoktavausgabe edition of Nietzsche's writings by C. G. Naumann. In it, following Köselitz's suggestion she included a selection from Nietzsche's posthumous fragments, which was gathered together and entitled The Will To Power. She claimed that this text was substantially the magnum opus, which Nietzsche had hoped to write and name "The Will to Power, An Attempt at a Revaluation of All Values". The first German edition, containing 483 sections, published in 1901, was edited by Köselitz, Ernst Horneffer, and August Horneffer, under Elisabeth's direction. This version was superseded in 1906 by an expanded second edition containing 1067 sections. This later compilation is what has come to be commonly known as The Will to Power.

== Colli and Montinari research ==
While researching materials for the Italian translation of Nietzsche's complete works in the 1960s, the philologists Giorgio Colli and Mazzino Montinari decided to go to the Archives in Leipzig to work with the original documents. From their work emerged the first complete and chronological edition of Nietzsche's writings, including the posthumous fragments from which Förster-Nietzsche had assembled The Will To Power. The complete works comprise 5,000 pages, compared to the 3,500 pages of the Großoktavausgabe. In 1964, during the International Colloquium on Nietzsche in Paris, Colli and Montinari met Karl Löwith, who would put them in contact with Heinz Wenzel, editor for Walter de Gruyter's publishing house. Heinz Wenzel would buy the rights of the complete works of Colli and Montinari (33 volumes in German) after the French Gallimard edition and the Italian Adelphi editions.

Before Colli and Montinari's philological work, the previous editions led readers to believe that Nietzsche had organized all his work toward a final structured opus called The Will to Power. In fact, if Nietzsche did consider producing such a book, he had abandoned such plans in the months before his collapse. The title of The Will to Power, which appears for the first time at the end of the summer of 1885, was replaced by another plan at the end of August 1888. This new plan was titled "Attempt at a revaluation of all values" [Versuch einer Umwerthung aller Werthe], and ordered the multiple fragments in a completely different way than the one chosen by Elisabeth Förster-Nietzsche.

Mazzino Montinari and Giorgio Colli have called The Will to Power a "historic forgery" artificially assembled by Nietzsche's sister and Köselitz/Gast. Although Nietzsche had in 1886 announced (at the end of On the Genealogy of Morals) a new work with the title, The Will to Power: An Attempt at a Revaluation of All Values, the project under this title was set aside and some of its draft materials used to compose The Twilight of the Idols and The Antichrist (both written in 1888, see Magnum in parvo: A philosophy in compendium); the latter was for a time represented as the first part of a new four-part magnum opus, which inherited the subtitle Revaluation of All Values from the earlier project as its new title. Although Elisabeth Förster called The Will to Power Nietzsche's unedited magnum opus, in light of Nietzsche's collapse, his intentions for the material he had not by that time put to use in The Twilight of the Idols and The Antichrist are simply unknowable. So The Will to Power was not a text completed by Nietzsche, but rather an anthology of selections from his notebooks misrepresented as if it were something more. Nevertheless, the concept remains, and has, since the reading of Karl Löwith, been identified as a key component of Nietzsche's philosophy although many believe so erroneously, so much so that Heidegger, under Löwith's influence, considered it to form, with the thought of the eternal recurrence, the basis of his thought.

In fact, according to Montinari, not only did the Will To Power impose its own order on the fragments, but many individual fragments were themselves cut up or stitched together in ways not made clear to the reader. Gilles Deleuze himself saluted Montinari's work declaring:

As long as it was not possible for the most serious researcher to accede to the whole of Nietzsche's manuscripts, we knew only in a loose way that the Will to Power did not exist as such (...) We wish only now that the new dawn brought on by this previously unpublished work will be the sign of a return to Nietzsche.

Drawing on this research for support, Montinari also called into question the very conception of a Nietzschean magnum opus, given his style of writing and thinking.

== Further research ==
In 2006, Thomas H. Brobjer stated in the abstract to his study, Nietzsche's magnum opus:

Nietzsche did not write a completed magnum opus, a "Hauptwerk", but he planned to do so during at least the last 5 years of his active life. I will show that during and after the writing of Also sprach Zarathustra this was his main aim and ambition. The projected work passed through a number of related phases, of which the much discussed and controversial Will to Power was merely one. This intention to write a magnum opus has been denied or almost completely ignored by almost all commentators (and even the many writers of Nietzsche biographies). I will bring attention to this intention, discuss why it has been ignored and show that an awareness of it is important for our understanding of the late Nietzsche's thinking and for determining the value and originality of his late notes. It has been a failure of historians of philosophy, intellectual historians and Nietzsche scholars not to have taken this into consideration and account.

Since Nietzsche asked his landlord to burn some of his notes in 1888 when he left Sils Maria, and these notes were ultimately incorporated into the compilation The Will to Power, some scholars argue that Nietzsche rejected his project on the will to power at the end of his lucid life. However, a recent study (Huang 2019) shows that the "burning" story indicates little about Nietzsche's project on the will to power, not only because only 11 “aphorisms” saved from the flames were published in The Will to Power, but also because these abandoned notes mainly focus on topics such as the critique of morality while touching upon the “feeling of power” only once.

== English translations ==
- "Der Wille zur Macht" was first translated into English by Anthony M. Ludovici in 1910, and was published in Oscar Levy's edition of Nietzsche's papers. Ludovici held that the text, incomplete though it was, represented Nietzsche's intended magnum opus.
- Friedrich Nietzsche (1910). "The will to power. An attempted transvaluation of all values. Books one and two". In Oscar Levy (ed.). The complete works of Friedrich Nietzsche. Vol. 14. Edinburgh and London: T. N. Foulis. (Revised third edition 1925, published by The Macmillan Company)
- Friedrich Nietzsche (1910). "The will to power. An attempted transvaluation of all values. Books three and four". In Oscar Levy (ed.). The complete works of Friedrich Nietzsche. Vol. 15 (1st ed.). Edinburgh and London: T. N. Foulis.
- Friedrich Nietzsche (1968). The Will to Power. Random House. ISBN 978-0-394-70437-1. Another translation was published by Kaufmann with Hollingdale in 1968
- "The Will to Power". Publication Date: 3/28/2017 ISBN 9780141195353 Paperback (English). The latest translation, by R. Kevin Hill and Michael A. Scarpitti for Penguin Classics

== Editions ==
- Der Wille zur Macht. Versuch einer Umwerthung aller Werthe (Studien und Fragmente), 1901 (as part of Nachgelassene Werke), ed. by Ernst Horneffer, August Horneffer and Peter Gast, with a foreword by Elisabeth Förster-Nietzsche, publ. C. G. Naumann, (usual abbreviation: ¹WM)
- Der Wille zur Macht, 1906, ed. by Elisabeth Förster-Nietzsche and Peter Gast (usual abbreviation: ²WM)
- Der Wille zur Macht: eine Auslegung alles Geschehens, 1917, ed. by Max Brahn
- Der Wille zur Macht, 1922[1911] (15th volume of Nachgelassene Werk), publ. A. Kröner Werke
- Der Wille zur Macht, 1926[1922] (19th volume of Gesammelte Werke: Musarionausgabe), ed. by Richard Oehler, Max Oehler, and Friedrich Würzbach Gesammelte WerkeLiteratur - Kultur - DER SPIEGEL
- Der Wille zur Macht, 1930 (as part of Werke in zwei Bänden), ed. by August Messer
- La Volonté de Puissance, 1935, ed. by Friedrich Würzbach (Gallimard)
- Digitale Kritische Gesamtausgabe Werke und Briefe – digital critical edition of the complete works, posthumous fragments, and letters, based on the critical text by Colli and Montinari, edited by Paolo D'Iorio, Paris, Nietzsche Source, 2009–

== See also ==
- Nietzschean affirmation
- Will to power
