= Nietzschean affirmation =

Concept in Friedrich Nietzsche's philosophy

Nietzschean affirmation (German: Bejahung) is a concept that scholars have identified in the philosophy of Friedrich Nietzsche. An example used to describe the concept is a fragment in Nietzsche's The Will to Power:

Suppose that we said yes to a single moment, then we have not only said yes to ourselves, but to the whole of existence. For nothing stands alone, either in ourselves or in things; and if our soul did but once vibrate and resound with a chord of happiness, then all of eternity was necessary to bring forth this one occurrence—and in this single moment when we said yes, all of eternity was embraced, redeemed, justified and affirmed.

— Nietzsche, Friedrich, The Will to Power: Selections from the Notebooks of the 1880s (translated by R. Kevin Hill and Michael A. Scarpitti). Penguin Books, 2017, p. 566

Nietzsche’s affirmative philosophy, as expressed in his parable about eternal recurrence, places his conception of amor fati and his instruction towards the positive embrace of the will to power in a cosmically expanded and universally determined context. Only the embrace of what is and will be, according to the will and its position within natural accident, constitutes freedom (or its nameless equivalent) in Nietzsche’s vision. The ethical injunction about what should be is dismissed by this parable.

== Opposition to Schopenhauer ==
Walter Kaufmann wrote that Nietzsche "celebrates the Greeks who, facing up to the terrors of nature and history, did not seek refuge in 'a Buddhistic negation of the will,' as Schopenhauer did, but instead created tragedies in which life is affirmed as beautiful in spite of everything." Schopenhauer’s negation of the will was a saying "no" to life and to the world, which he judged to be a scene of pain and evil. "[D]irectly against Schopenhauer’s place as the ultimate nay-sayer to life, Nietzsche positioned himself as the ultimate yes-sayer...." Nietzsche's affirmation of life's pain and evil, in opposition to Schopenhauer, resulted from an overflow of life. Schopenhauer's advocacy of self-denial and negation of life was, according to Nietzsche, very harmful. For his entire mature life, Nietzsche was concerned with the damage that he thought resulted from Schopenhauerian disgust with life and turning against the world.

== Derridean interpretation ==
Jacques Derrida took interest in Nietzschean affirmation as a recognition of the absence of a center or origin within language and its many parts, with no firm ground from which to base any Logos or truth. This shock allows for two reactions in Derrida's philosophy: the more negative, melancholic response, which he designates as Rousseauistic, or the more positive Nietzschean affirmation. Rousseau's perspective focuses on deciphering the truth and origin of language and its many signs, an often exhaustive occupation. Derrida's response to Nietzsche, however, offers an active participation with these signs and arrives at, in Derridean philosophy, a more resolute response to language.

In "Structure, Sign, and Play", Derrida articulates Nietzsche's perspective as:

... the joyous affirmation of the play of the world and of the innocence of becoming, the affirmation of a world of signs without fault, without truth, and without origin which is offered to an active interpretation.

Derrida not only fostered Nietzsche's work but evolved it within the sphere of language; in doing so, he acquired and employs Nietzsche's optimism in his conception of the 'play' of language - that is inherent in language - as being far more than just "the substitution of given and existing, present, pieces". Much of this spirit resides in the abandonment of any sort of new humanism; this acceptance of the inevitable allows for considerable relief – evident in the designation of the loss of center as a non-center – as well as the opportunity to affirm and cultivate play, which enables humanity and the humanities "to pass beyond man and humanism".

== In Deleuzean ontology ==
In Gilles Deleuze's ontology, affirmation is defined as a positive power of a self-driven differentiation of forces that is opposed to the sublated interdependence of opposites of the Hegelian dialectic. In Difference and Repetition Deleuze connects his concept of ontological intensive quantities to that which "affirms even the lowest". This is paralleled somewhat in Nietzsche's idea that the Eternal Return had "welded the furthest to the nearest, and fire to spirit and joy to sorrow and the wickedest to the kindest" in the heart of his character Zarathustra.

== See also ==
- Amor fati
- Everlasting Yea
- Posthumanism
