= Gustavo Bontadini =

Italian philosopher (1903–1990)

Gustavo Bontadini (Milan, 27 March 1903 – Milan, 12 April 1990) was an Italian philosopher, writer, and a teacher. He was born in Milan and died in 1990, aged 87. Bontadini was also an influential representative known for Neo-Scholasticism in the 20th century. From 1951 to 1973, he became a professor of Theoretical philosophy in the Catholic university in Milan.

He was the teacher of, among others, Angelo Scola, Emanuele Severino, Giovanni Reale, Evandro Agazzi, Virgilio Melchiorre, Luigi Negri, Luisa Muraro, Carmelo Vigna, Giuseppe Barzaghi, Alessandro Cortese, Paolo Aldo Rossi, Giorgio Buccellati, and Paolo Pagani.

He was the brother of soccer player and physician Franco Bontadini.

== Biography ==
He enrolled at the Catholic University of Milan when it first opened, but before it was recognized by the Italian government. In 1925, he was the third graduate of the university with a dissertation on the Metaphysics of experience, realized under the supervision of Antonio Masnovo. At the Catholic University of Milan he was then professor of Theoretical philosophy from 1951 to 1973, the year of his retirement.

He also taught at the University of Urbino (1940-1950), the University of Milan (1944-1946), and the University of Pavia (1947-1951).

== Thought ==
=== A return to Parmenides ===
While referring to classical metaphysics, that of Aristotle and Thomas Aquinas, Bontadini declares himself "neoclassical," meaning to highlight the new role that ancient metaphysics can play in contemporary philosophy.

In fact, he defines himself as "a metaphysician rooted in the heart of modern thought."

Referring to idealistic philosophy, he particularly appreciates its "methodological truth," which highlighted the role of consciousness, of the Cartesian "cogito," in grasping the meaning of being while considering it as ‘'other’', different from the subjectivity of consciousness itself, thus realizing an identity between the subject and the object, between intellect and sensitivity, which brings to light the ancient Parmenides theory of the identity of Being and Thought.

Bontadini's Parmenides does not exclude "the observation of becoming, on the one hand, and the denunciation of its contradictory nature, on the other. Two protocols that refer respectively to the two pillars of the foundation: experience and the principle of non-contradiction (first principle). The two protocols contradict each other, and yet both enjoy the title of truth [...] they are truths, however, which, taken in antinomy (the antinomy of experience and the logo), find themselves having to fight against an accusation of falsehood. For experience opposes the truth of the logo, and the logo opposes that of experience".

=== The knowledge ===
A new conception of knowledge underpins Bontadini's thinking, which reaffirms its origin in experience, but experience no longer understood as the result of the operations of reason (Rationalism) or as the passive reception of empirical data (Empiricism), but as "presence”: while contemporary epistemology continues to conceive of it within the framework of a dualism of being and knowing, thus correlating the metaphysical problem with that of knowing and giving rise to the difficult question of what correlation there may be between thought and reality.

But whenever we consider what is believed to be “beyond” thought, this is inevitably in thought, it belongs to thought itself.

Therefore, every experience as “presence” is absolute, because it is not constructed, and it is total, since every single empirical fact is part of it.

=== The unity of experience ===
This leads us to the concept of “unity of experience,” where a circular relationship develops between experience and thought, constituting knowledge.

But according to Parmenides' teaching, the essence of experience is becoming, which appears contradictory in its reality of being and existing, understood as opposed to not being.

How, then, can knowledge be based on a contradictory structure of being and becoming?

“Becoming presents itself as contradictory; indeed, as the very embodiment of contradiction (the identification of the positive and the negative), as the denial of supreme and immediate identity: being is.”

=== The solution in God the Creator ===
“The entity, which is temporal insofar as it is empirical, is eternal insofar as it is divine.”.

The contradiction inherent in becoming can be overcome in the existence of God creator: “The contradiction of becoming is overcome with the doctrine of creation, in that the identification of being and non-being, which we find in experience, is now seen as the result of the action of Being”, of the One who creates being from non-being.

But does being then fall back into nothingness by becoming?

One cannot, replies Bontadini, absurdly think that being is destroyed by nothingness, but the world created by God is different from Him and yet coincides with Him in His creation, without altering His essential immutability.

== The controversy with Emanuele Severino ==
Emanuele Severino, drawing conclusions from his teacher Bontadini's conception in 1964 in an essay published in the Rivista di filosofia neo-scolastica (fasc. II) entitled Ritornare a Parmenide (Returning to Parmenides), eliminated any difference between the immutability of God and that of the world subject to becoming, so that everything would be eternal as God is eternal. In 1969 Bontadini was expelled by Milan Catholic University for his philosophical positions.

Responded in harshly ironic tones Bontadini in an article titled in ancient Greek Sozein ta fainomena (Saving Phenomena): "... I wondered [...] with what beard is to be found, in the world of being, my immutable alter ego. Since, from the time I was a freshman coming until today, of beards I have changed many hundreds. Now, if we assume that all of them are immutable, it seems to me that I would not find enough surface area on my body—the one fixed for eternity—to make room for all of them." Bontadini then reiterated his conception of the "principle of creation" that allows the contradictory nature of becoming to be overcome through the creative action of God: "inasmuch as that identification of being and non-being, which we encounter in experience, is now seen as the result of the action of Being (indivensible action of indivensible Being)."

Against Severino, who deduced the eternity of all that exists from Parmenides' principle, Bontadini developed a philosophical proposal that preserved the Christian principle of creation, but he was not listened to, not even by the Catholic Church.

The long-distance dialogue continued in the following years. The central point of disagreement centered on whether or not experience attests to becoming: a truth admitted by Bontadini (even if we do not experience the annihilation of entities, but only their appearance/disappearance, such experience is still change), in agreement with common sense and the Western philosophical tradition, but denied by Severino, for whom the traditional conception of becoming is a misinterpretation of experience.

== Awards and honours ==
The Università Cattolica del Sacro Cuore (the Milan Catholic University) great hall was named in honour of Bontadini. It was an ancient ice house shaped a circle of 8 meters radius and located at a depth of 11 meters.

== Selected works ==
- Saggio di una metafisica dell'esperienza, Milano, Vita e pensiero, 1938.
- Studi sull'idealismo. Serie prima (1923-1935), Urbino, A. Argalia, 1942.
- Dall'attualismo al problematicismo. Studii sulla filosofia italiana contemporanea, Brescia, La scuola, 1945.
- Studi sulla filosofia dell'età cartesiana, Brescia, La scuola, 1947.
- Dal problematicismo alla metafisica. Nuovi studi sulla filosofia italiana contemporanea, Milano, Marzorati, 1952.
- Indagini di struttura sul gnoseologismo moderno. I. Berkeley, Leibniz, Hume, Kant, Brescia, La scuola, 1952.
- Il compito della metafisica (a cura di), Milano, Fratelli Bocca, 1952.
- Studi di filosofia moderna, Brescia, La scuola, 1966.
- Conversazioni di metafisica, 2 voll., Milano, Vita e pensiero, 1971.
- Metafisica e deellenizzazione, Milano, Vita e pensiero, 1975.
- Appunti di filosofia, Milano, Vita e pensiero, 1996. ISBN 88-343-3680-1
- Gentile e la metafisica, Brescia, Morcelliana, 2025.
