= Richard Oehler =

German scholar (1878–1948)

Richard Oehler (German: [ˈøːlɐ]; 27 February 1878, Heckholzhausen, Hesse-Nassau – 13 November 1948, Wiesbaden) was a German Nietzsche scholar – an early editor of the philosopher's works, and author of Friedrich Nietzsche und die deutsche Zukunft (Leipzig: Armanen-Verlag, 1935), which has been characterized by Walter Kaufmann as "one of the first Nazi books on Nietzsche" (Basic Writings of Nietzsche, New York: The Modern Library, 2000, p. 387, n. 27). His brother was Max Oehler, who directed the Nietzsche Archive in Weimar, Germany. The Oehlers were family relations of the Nietzsches.
