= Max Oehler =

German Army officer (1875–1946)

- Born: December 29, 1875
- Died: March 1946 (aged 70)
- Military career
- Allegiance: German Empire

Max Oehler (German: [ˈøːlɐ]; December 29, 1875 – March 1946) was a German army officer and archivist for the "Nietzsche-Archiv." Oehler pursued his career in the German Empire's military until the end of World War I and the German November Revolution. Under the Weimar Republic, which he opposed, he served as an archivist in his cousin Elisabeth Förster-Nietzsche's "Nietzsche-Archiv" in Weimar. After Förster-Nietzsche's death in 1935, he succeeded her as de facto leader of the Archiv. A devoted Nazi since the early 1930s, Oehler tried to popularize his National Socialist view of Nietzsche. After the German defeat in World War II, Oehler was imprisoned by Soviet occupation forces and died c. March 1946 in an improvised prison in Weimar.

== Family ==
Max Oehler was born in Blessenbach im Taunus (today part of Weinbach). His father, Oskar Ulrich Oehler (1838–1901), was a Lutheran minister and the brother of Franziska Nietzsche, Friedrich and Elisabeth Nietzsche's mother. Max Oehler's mother was Auguste Oehler (née Forst) (1847–1920). Like his brother Richard Oehler, a librarian, and his cousin Adalbert Oehler, a low-ranking government official, Max Oehler became involved in Elisabeth Förster-Nietzsche's "Nietzsche-Archiv," which thus became sort of a family business.

Oehler married then 18-year-old Annemarie Lemelson in 1911, with whom he had several children.

== Life and work ==
=== Before 1919: In the military ===
From 1889 to 1895, Oehler was a student at Pforta. He then joined the Prussian Army, although he also showed considerable interest in literature and especially music. He would often express to his cousin Elisabeth Förster-Nietzsche a wish to work at her "Nietzsche-Archiv" someday. Nevertheless, his main interest was his career in the army, whose values he deeply admired. He was made Oberleutnant in 1908, Hauptmann in 1912, and was allowed to call himself Major when he left the army in 1919. For a long time, he was stationed in Deutsch Eylau, today Iława.

He was granted leave from April 1 till December 31, 1908, to work at the "Nietzsche-Archiv" in Weimar. In the summer, he travelled to Ernest Thiel in Stockholm as Elisabeth Förster-Nietzsche's emissary. Thiel, a banker and patron, had agreed to give a considerable amount of money for the founding of Förster-Nietzsche's "Stiftung Nietzsche-Archiv" (Nietzsche-Archiv foundation), despite his being partly of Jewish ancestry. (Förster-Nietzsche had married Bernhard Förster, an antisemitic agitator, but by this time had renounced antisemitism). At the end of 1908, Oehler became a member of the new Stiftung's Vorstand, or managerial board, on which he remained until 1945.

Oehler took part in the Battle of Tannenberg (1914) early in World War I, but soon became unable to fight due to a case of sciatica. He performed bureaucratic activities for the remainder of the war, first in Marienburg (Malbork), and then at the Ministry of War in Berlin. He had great faith in the possibility of a German victory and was shocked by the German November Revolution. In the months following the war, Oehler stayed on at the Ministry of War and, together with other officers, tried to regain power from the revolutionary Soldatenräte (soldiers' councils, see workers' council), whom he despised.

=== After 1919: At the Nietzsche-Archiv ===
In 1919, Oehler left the military with the rank of Major and went to work with Elisabeth Förster-Nietzsche at the Nietzsche-Archiv, beginning in April. He settled first in Bad Berka, and then in Weimar. He was very deferential towards his much older cousin and soon became her "right hand". His family in a way also became hers, as she had long lost her brother and husband and had never had children.

In addition to Max Oehler, Förster-Nietzsche's "Nietzsche-Archiv" also employed Richard Oehler (Max's brother) and Adalbert Oehler (a cousin). The Archiv operated like a family business. They had all shared an opposition to the democratic Weimar Republic and had been more or less sympathetic towards the Conservative Revolutionary movement and the rise of Fascism. Max Oehler was especially favorable towards Benito Mussolini, whom in 1925 he declared a true follower of Nietzsche. Nevertheless, Oehler and his wife were members of Hermann Graf Keyserling's anti-militarist "Schule der Weisheit".

In 1931, Oehler became a member of the Nazi Party and hitched the Archiv's connections to the growing Nazi movement. Like Elisabeth Förster-Nietzsche, he embraced Adolf Hitler's rise to power. Hitler visited the Archiv on several occasions between 1932 and 1934.

After Förster-Nietzsche's death in 1935, Oehler became the de facto leader of the Archiv, which lost completely the character of a salon: Oehler instead guided visitors such as students, soldiers and guests through the Archiv and tried to popularize his Nazi view of Nietzsche in speeches and essays.

Following Elisabeth Förster-Nietzsche's death, it became known within the Archiv that she had forged some documents and anecdotes relating to her brother Friedrich; this fact was not made public, however. In fact, Oehler seems to have publicly renounced only one of Förster-Nietzsche's legends: in 1937, he showed in an article that the Nietzsche family did not descend from Polish nobility, as was claimed by both Elisabeth and Friedrich Nietzsche himself on occasion. Oehler's conclusion is accepted as correct today, and was very much approved by Nazi ideology.

The United States Army occupied Weimar in 1945, at the close of World War II, and later handed the city over to Soviet forces. Oehler attempted to defend the Nietzsche-Archiv from the charge of having supported the Nazi regime, claiming that it always had been politically neutral. He could maintain that soldiers did not use the Archiv rooms, but the Soviet administration nevertheless froze all the Archiv's accounts. On December 6, 1945, Oehler was picked up by someone claiming to be Soviet interpreter. He never returned. As the family later found out, he had been sentenced to penal labour in Siberia but had died, probably of hunger or freezing, in an improvised prison while still in Weimar.
