= Mazzino Montinari =

Italian philosopher (1928–1986)

- Born: April 4, 1928; Lucca, Italy
- Died: November 24, 1986 (aged 58); Florence, Italy
- Occupation: Scholar of Germanistics

Mazzino Montinari (4 April 1928 – 24 November 1986) was an Italian scholar of Germanistics. A native of Lucca, he became regarded as one of the most distinguished researchers on Friedrich Nietzsche, and harshly criticized the edition of The Will to Power, which he regarded as a forgery, in his book The Will to Power Does Not Exist.

== Biography ==
After the end of fascism in Italy, Montinari became an active member of the Italian Communist Party, for which he took up the translation of German writings. During 1953, when he visited East Germany for research, he witnessed the Uprising of 1953. Later, after the suppression of the 1956 Hungarian Revolution, he drifted away from orthodox Marxism and his career in party organizations. He did, however, retain his membership in the Italian Communist Party and stayed true to the aims of socialism.

At the end of the 1950s, with Giorgio Colli, who had been his high school teacher in the 1940s, Montinari began to prepare an Italian translation of Nietzsche's works. After reviewing the available collection of Nietzsche's published works and the unpublished manuscripts held in Weimar, Colli and Montinari decided to begin a new critical edition. This edition, which became the scholarly standard, was published in Italian by Adelphi in Milan, in French by Éditions Gallimard in Paris, in German by Walter de Gruyter and in Dutch by Sun (translated by Michel van Nieuwstadt). Of particular help for this project was Montinari's ability to decipher Nietzsche's nearly unreadable handwriting, which before him had been transcribed only by Peter Gast (born Heinrich Köselitz). Stanford University Press has released an english version of the Complete Works of Nietzsche's work based on the student edition (Kritische Studienausgabe) adapted from the Giorgio Colli & Mazzino Montinari Critical German edition (Kritische Gesamtausgabe).

In 1972, Montinari and others founded the international journal Nietzsche-Studien, to which Montinari remained a significant contributor until his death. Through his translations and his commentary on Nietzsche, Montinari demonstrated a method of interpretation based on philological research instead of hasty speculations. He saw value in placing Nietzsche in the context of his time, and to this end, he and Colli began a critical collection of Nietzsche's correspondence.

Montinari died in Florence in 1986.

== Works ==
- Philipp Felsch, How Nietzsche Came in From the Cold: Tale of a Redemption, trans. Daniel Bowles. Polity, 2024, ISBN 978-1-509-55761-5.
- Reading Nietzsche, trans. Greg Whitlock, University of Illinois Press, 2003, ISBN 0-252-02798-1
- "'The Will to Power' Does Not Exist" edited by Paolo D'Iorio (a book criticizing The Will to Power as a forgery, ill-assembled by Elisabeth Förster-Nietzsche)
