= Giorgio Colli =

Italian philosopher, philologist and historian

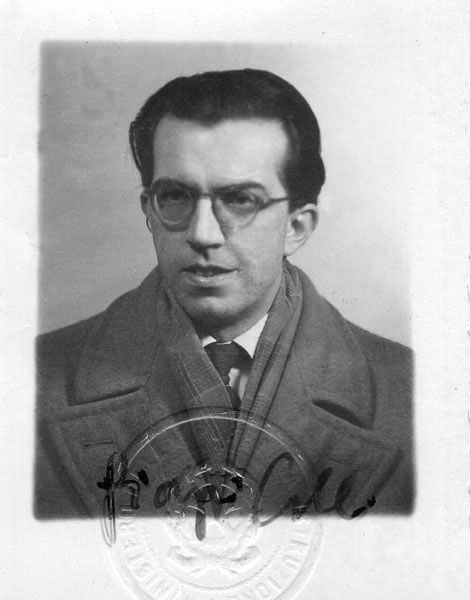
Giorgio Colli

Giorgio Colli (16 January 1917 – 6 January 1979) was an Italian philosopher, philologist and historian. A native of Turin, he taught ancient philosophy at Pisa's university for thirty years; he edited and translated Aristotle's Organon and Kant's Critique of Pure Reason for Einaudi, a major publishing house in Italy. Subsequently, he produced the first complete edition of Nietzsche's work (including all the posthumous fragments chronologically ordered) together with his friend Mazzino Montinari. His work culminated in La Sapienza greca, an edition and translation of the "Presocratics" (a term he rejected). Interrupted by his death in 1979 in Fiesole, it was supposed to be in eleven volumes.

== Bibliography ==
Edited in Italian by Adelphi and in French by the Éditions de l'Éclat.

- Physis kryptesthai philei (Natura ama nascondersi), Milan 1948, IIe édition 1991; French transl. La Nature aime se cacher, 1994.
- Filosofia dell'espressione, Milan 1969; Fr.transl. Philosophie de l'expression, 1988.
- Dopo Nietzsche, Milan, 1974; Fr. transl. Après Nietzsche, 1987, IIe éd. 2000 [1]
- La nascita della filosofia, Milan, 1975; Fr. transl. Naissance de la philosophie, 2003 [2]
- La Sapienza greca, 3 vols. Milan 1977-1980; Fr. transl. La sagesse grecque, 1990-1992
- La ragione errabonda. Quaderni postumi, Milan 1982, Fr. transl. I. Philosophie de la distance; II Philosophie du contact; III Nietzsche, 1999-2000.
- Scritti su Nietzsche, Milan 1980, Fr. transl. Écrits sur Nietzsche, 1996
- Per una enciclopedia di autori classici, Milan 1983; Fr. transl. Pour une encyclopédie des auteurs classiques, 1990
- Gorgia e Parmenide. Adelphi, Milan, 2003
- Platone politico. Adelphi, Milan, 2007
- Filosofi sovrumani. Adelphi, Milan, 2009
- Apollineo e dionisiaco. Adelphi, Milan, 2010

== See also ==
- Mazzino Montinari and the Will to Power

== Sources ==
- Federica Montevecchi, Giorgio Colli. Biografia intellettuale, Bollati Boringhieri, Torino, 2004.
