= God is dead =

Quote by philosopher Friedrich Nietzsche

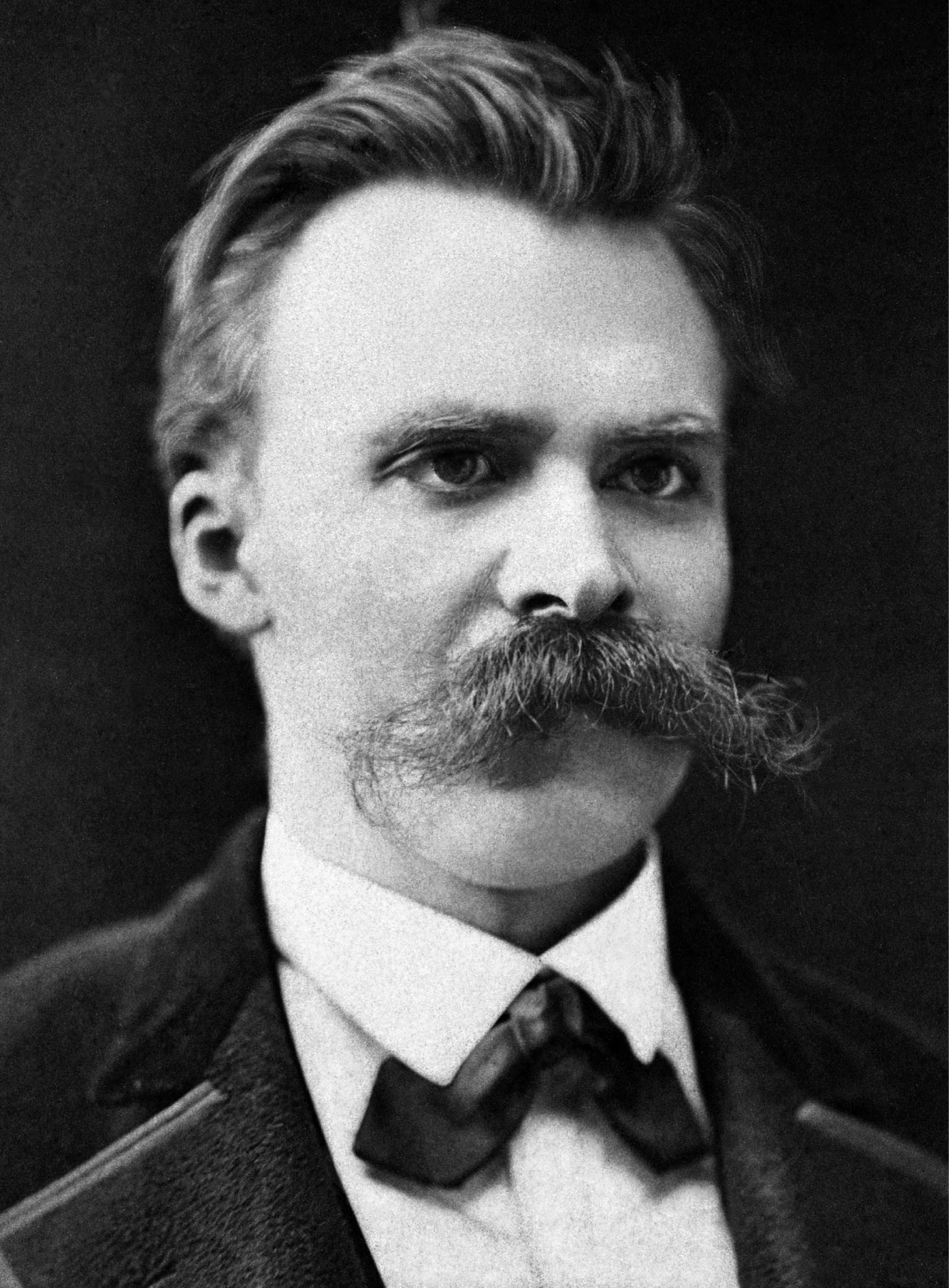
Photo of Friedrich Nietzsche, who used the phrase "God is dead" in several of his writings. Photograph by Friedrich Hermann Hartmann, circa 1875.

"God is dead" (German: Gott ist tot [ɡɔt ɪst toːt]; also known as the death of God) is a metaphor used by the philosopher Friedrich Nietzsche, appearing in The Gay Science (1882) and Thus Spoke Zarathustra (1883–85). Nietzsche does not claim that a supernatural being has perished, nor does he offer an argument for atheism as a doctrine. Rather, the phrase is a diagnostic claim about the condition of Western civilisation. Nietzsche used "God" as a symbol representing Christian morality and its metaphysical worldview that, for centuries, provided Europe with its foundation for morality, meaning, and value.

== Usages before Nietzsche ==
=== Early usages ===
Discourses of a "death of God" in German culture appear as early as the 17th century and originally referred to Lutheran theories of atonement. The phrase "God himself is dead" also translated as "God himself lies dead" ("Gott selbst liegt tot"), appears in the Lutheran hymn by Johann von Rist "Ein trauriger Grabgesang" ("A mournful dirge"), also named "O Traurigkeit, o Herzeleid" ("Oh sadness, Oh heartache").

Before Nietzsche, the phrase 'Dieu est mort!' ('God is dead') was written in Gérard de Nerval's 1854 poem "Le Christ aux oliviers" ("Christ at the olive trees"). The poem is an adaptation into a verse of a dream-vision that appears in Jean Paul's 1797 novel Siebenkäs under the chapter title of 'The Dead Christ Proclaims That There Is No God'. In an address he gave in 1987 to the American Academy of Arts and Sciences, the literary scholar George Steiner claims that Nietzsche's formulation 'God is dead' is indebted to the aforementioned 'Dead Christ' dream-vision of Jean Paul.

The phrase is also found in a passage expressed by a narrator in Victor Hugo's 1862 novel Les Misérables:

"God is dead, perhaps," said Gerard de Nerval one day to the writer of these lines, confounding progress with God, and taking the interruption of movement for the death of Being.

=== German philosophy ===
==== Hegel ====
Contemporary historians believe that 19th-century German idealist philosophers, especially those associated with Georg Wilhelm Friedrich Hegel, are responsible for removing the specifically Christian resonance of the phrase relating to the death of Jesus Christ and associating it with secular philosophical and sociological theories.

Although the statement and its meaning are attributed to Nietzsche, Hegel had discussed the concept of the death of God in his Phenomenology of Spirit, where he considers the death of God to "Not be seen as anything but an easily recognized part of the usual Christian cycle of redemption". Later on Hegel writes about the great pain of knowing that God is dead:

The pure concept, however, or infinity, as the abyss of nothingness in which all being sinks, must characterize the infinite pain, which previously was only in culture historically and as the feeling on which rests modern religion, the feeling that God Himself is dead, (the feeling which was uttered by Pascal, though only empirically, in his saying: Nature is such that it marks everywhere, both in and outside of man, a lost God), purely as a phase, but also as no more than just a phase, of the highest idea.

In his Lectures on the Philosophy of Religion, Hegel wrote:

"God himself is dead," it says in a Lutheran hymn ['O Traurigkeit, O Herzeleid' by Johann Rist], expressing an awareness that the human, the finite, the fragile, the weak, the negative are themselves a moment of the divine, that they are within God himself, that finitude, negativity, otherness are not outside of God and do not, as otherness, hinder unity with God. Otherness, the negative, is known to be a moment of the divine nature itself.

For Jon Stewart, this statement of Hegel in his Lectures does not relate to a lapse of religious belief, rather Hegel interprets the sentence "God himself is dead" as "an important part of understanding the nature of the divine in the Christian religion".

Hegel's student Richard Rothe, in his 1837 theological text Die Anfänge der christlichen Kirche und ihrer Verfassung, appears to be one of the first philosophers to associate the idea of a death of God with the sociological theory of secularization.

Buddhist philosopher K. Satchidananda Murty wrote in 1973 that, coming across in the hymn of Johann von Rist, what Hegel described as "the cruel words", "the harsh utterance", namely, "God himself is dead", developed the theme of God's death according to whom, to one form of experience, God is dead. Murty continued that commenting on Kant's first Critique, Heinrich Heine who had purportedly influenced Nietzsche spoke of a dying God. Since Heine and Nietzsche the phrase Death of God became popular.

==== Stirner ====
German philosopher Max Stirner, whose influence on Nietzsche is debated, writes in his 1844 book The Ego and its Own that "the work of the Enlightenment, the vanquishing of God: they did not notice that man has killed God in order to become now – 'sole God on high'".

==== Mainländer ====
Before Nietzsche, the concept was popularized in philosophy by the German philosopher Philipp Mainländer.

It was while reading Mainländer that Nietzsche explicitly writes to have parted ways with Schopenhauer. In Mainländer's more than 200 pages long criticism of Schopenhauer's metaphysics, he argues against one cosmic unity behind the world, and champions a real multiplicity of wills struggling with each other for existence. Yet, he alleges, the interconnection and the unitary movement of the world, which are the reasons that lead philosophers to pantheism, are undeniable. They do indeed lead to a unity, says Mainländer, but this may not be at the expense of a unity in the world that undermines the empirical reality of the world. It is therefore declared to be dead.

Now we have the right to give this being the well-known name that always designates what no power of imagination, no flight of the boldest fantasy, no intently devout heart, no abstract thinking however profound, no enraptured and transported spirit has ever attained: God. But this basic unity is of the past; it no longer is. It has, by changing its being, totally and completely shattered itself. God has died and his death was the life of the world. (Note: Jetzt haben wir auch das Recht, diesem Wesen den bekannten Namen zu geben, der von jeher Das bezeichnete, was keine Vorstellungskraft, kein Flug der kühnsten Phantasie, kein abstraktes noch so tiefes Denken, kein gesammeltes, andachtsvolles Gemüth, kein entzückter, erdentrückter Geist je erreicht hat: Gott. Sie hat sich, ihr Wesen verändernd, voll und ganz zu einer Welt der Vielheit zersplittert. Aber diese einfache Einheit ist gewesen; sie ist nicht mehr. Gott ist gestorben und sein Tod war das Leben der Welt.)

— Mainländer, Die Philosophie der Erlösung

== Nietzsche ==
In The Gay Science, "God is dead" is first mentioned in "New Struggles":

After Buddha was dead, his shadow was still shown for centuries in a cave––a tremendous, gruesome shadow. God is dead; but given the way of men, there may still be caves for thousands of years in which his shadow will be shown. ––And we––we still have to vanquish his shadow, too.

Still in The Gay Science, the expression is stated through the voice of the "madman", in "The Madman", as follows:

God is dead. God remains dead. And we have killed him. How shall we comfort ourselves, the murderers of all murderers? What was holiest and mightiest of all that the world has yet owned has bled to death under our knives: who will wipe this blood off us? What water is there for us to clean ourselves? What festivals of atonement, what sacred games shall we have to invent? Is not the greatness of this deed too great for us? Must we ourselves not become gods simply to appear worthy of it?

— Nietzsche, The Gay Science, Book III, Section 125, tr. Walter Kaufmann

In the madman passage, the madman is described as running through a marketplace shouting, "I seek God! I seek God!" He arouses some amusement; no one takes him seriously. "Maybe he took an ocean voyage? Lost his way like a little child? Maybe he's afraid of us (non-believers) and is hiding?" – much laughter. Frustrated, the madman smashes his lantern on the ground, crying out that "God is dead, and we have killed him, you and I!". "But I have come too soon", he immediately realizes, as his detractors of a minute before stare in astonishment: people cannot yet see that they have killed God. He goes on to say:

This tremendous event is still on its way, still wandering; it has not yet reached the ears of men. Lightning and thunder require time, the light of the stars requires time, deeds, though done, still require time to be seen and heard. This deed is still more distant from them than the most distant stars – and yet they have done it themselves.

— Nietzsche, The Gay Science, Section 125, tr. Walter Kaufmann

Lastly, "The Meaning of our Cheerfulness" section of The Gay Science discusses what "God is dead" means ("that the belief in the Christian God has become unworthy of belief"), and the consequences of this fact.

In Thus Spoke Zarathustra, at the end of section 2 of Zarathustra's prologue, after beginning his allegorical journey, Zarathustra encounters an aged ascetic who expresses misanthropy and love of God (a "saint"). Nietzsche writes:

[Zarathustra] saluted the saint and said "What should I have to give you! But let me go quickly that I take nothing from you!" And thus they parted from one another, the old man and Zarathustra, laughing as two boys laugh.

But when Zarathustra was alone, he spoke thus to his heart: "Could it be possible! This old saint has not heard in his forest that God is dead!"

— Nietzsche, Thus Spoke Zarathustra, tr. R.J. Hollingdale

What is more, Zarathustra later not only refers to the death of God but states: "Dead are all the Gods." It is not just one morality that has died, but all of them, to be replaced by the life of the Übermensch, the overman:

'DEAD ARE ALL THE GODS: NOW DO WE DESIRE THE OVERMAN TO LIVE.'

— Nietzsche, Thus Spoke Zarathustra, Part I, Section XXII, 3, tr. Thomas Common

=== Interpretation ===
==== Martin Heidegger ====
Martin Heidegger understood Nietzsche's declaration "God is dead" as a commentary on the end of metaphysics. For Heidegger, Nietzsche's statement signifies not merely a theological or cultural shift but marks the culmination—and, consequently, the demise—of philosophy as metaphysics. Heidegger argued that metaphysics, which had structured Western thought from its inception, had now reached its maximum potential and, in doing so, had exhausted its relevance. The "death of God," then, is emblematic of this end, signaling the dissolution of any metaphysical worldview. According to Heidegger, metaphysics had been bound to end in this way since its origin.

Heidegger viewed the death of God as a pivotal moment in the history of thought, representing a transformation in humanity's relationship to "Being." This shift, he argued, invites a new mode of engagement with existence, one that transcends human-imposed structures of meaning and value. Unlike Nietzsche, who proposes the "will to power" as a means for individuals to assert their own values, Heidegger critiques this as a lingering form of human-centered valuation, one that still attempts to impose meaning onto existence.

Instead, Heidegger advocates a contemplative approach, suggesting that we "let Being be"—appreciating existence without the constraints of human valuation or the demand for purpose. This approach marks a philosophical divergence: while Nietzsche encourages the active creation of values in a world absent of divine authority, Heidegger calls for a more fundamental openness to Being itself, free from valuation. In this sense, the "death" of God is not only a loss but also an opportunity for a new, radically different understanding of existence.

== Death of God theology ==
Although theologians since Nietzsche had occasionally used the phrase "God is dead" to reflect increasing unbelief in God, the concept rose to prominence in theology in the late 1950s and 1960s, subsiding in the early 1970s, as the Death of God theology. The German-born theologian Paul Tillich, for instance, was influenced by the writings of Nietzsche, especially his phrase "God is dead".

== See also ==
- Philosophy of Friedrich Nietzsche
  - Apollonian and Dionysian
  - Übermensch
  - Zarathustra's roundelay
- Christian atheism
  - Postmodern Christianity
- Disenchantment
- Faith and rationality
- Jungian interpretation of religion
- Nontheism
- Postmodernity
- Post-theism
- Post-monotheism
- Theories about religions
- Death or departure of the gods
- Deicide
