= Thus Spoke Zarathustra =

Philosophical work by Friedrich Nietzsche

Thus Spoke Zarathustra: A Book for All and None
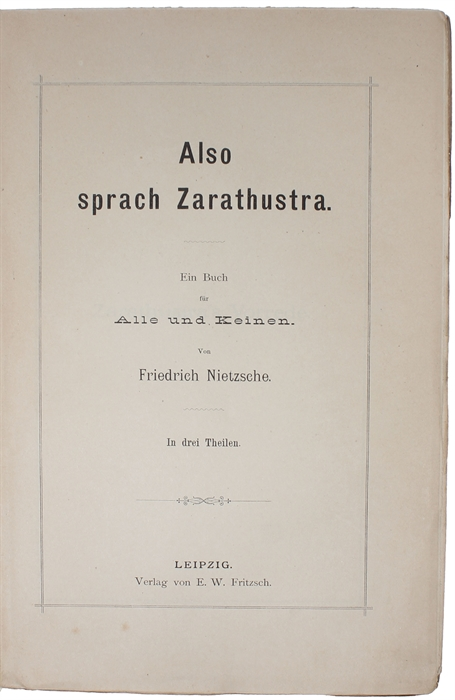
- Title page of the first three-book edition
- Author: Friedrich Nietzsche
- Original title: Also sprach Zarathustra: Ein Buch für Alle und Keinen
- Language: German
- Publisher: Ernst Schmeitzner
- Publication date: 1883–1892
- Publication place: Germany
- Media type: Print (Hardcover and Paperback)
- Preceded by: The Gay Science
- Followed by: Beyond Good and Evil
- Text: Thus Spoke Zarathustra: A Book for All and None at Wikisource

Thus Spoke Zarathustra: A Book for All and None (German: Also sprach Zarathustra: Ein Buch für Alle und Keinen), also translated as Thus Spake Zarathustra, is a work of philosophical fiction written by German philosopher Friedrich Nietzsche and published in four volumes between 1883 and 1885. The protagonist is nominally the historical Zarathustra, more commonly called Zoroaster in the West.

Much of the book consists of discourses by Zarathustra on a wide variety of subjects, most of which end with the refrain "thus spoke Zarathustra." The character of Zarathustra first appeared in Nietzsche's earlier book The Gay Science (at §342, which closely resembles §1 of "Zarathustra's Prologue" in Thus Spoke Zarathustra).

The style of Nietzsche's Zarathustra has facilitated varied and often incompatible ideas about what Nietzsche's Zarathustra says. The "[e]xplanations and claims" given by the character of Zarathustra in this work "are almost always analogical and figurative." Though there is no consensus about what Zarathustra means when he speaks, there is some consensus about that which he speaks. Thus Spoke Zarathustra deals with multiple subjects ranging from the mundane to philosophical, such as metaphysics, war, perspectivism, and the amorality of nature; it also began or elaborated on many of Nietzsche's core ideas such as the Übermensch, the death of God, the will to power, and eternal recurrence.

== Origins ==
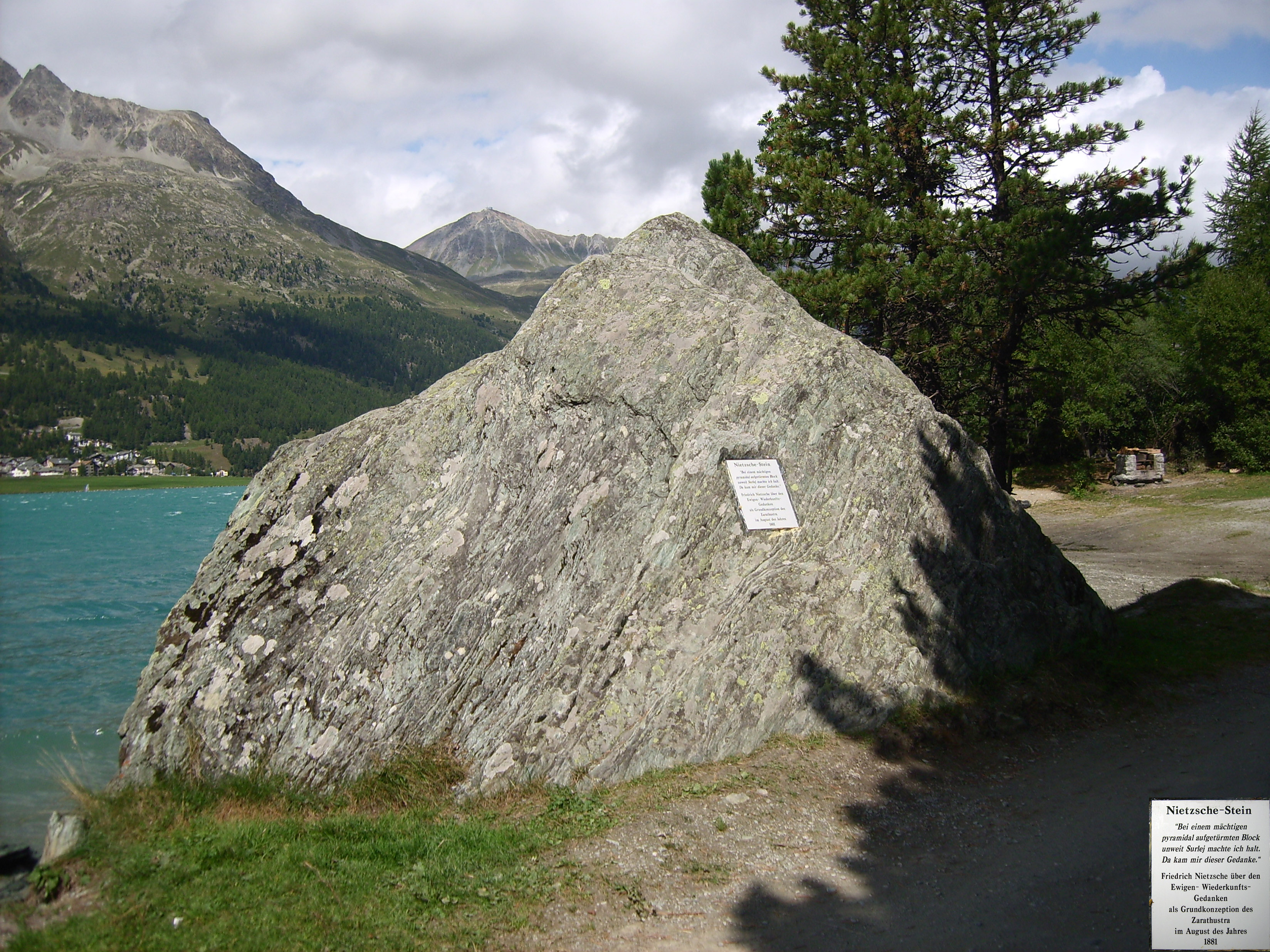
Nietzsche wrote in Ecce Homo that the central idea of Zarathustra occurred to him by a "pyramidal block of stone" on the shores of Lake Silvaplana.

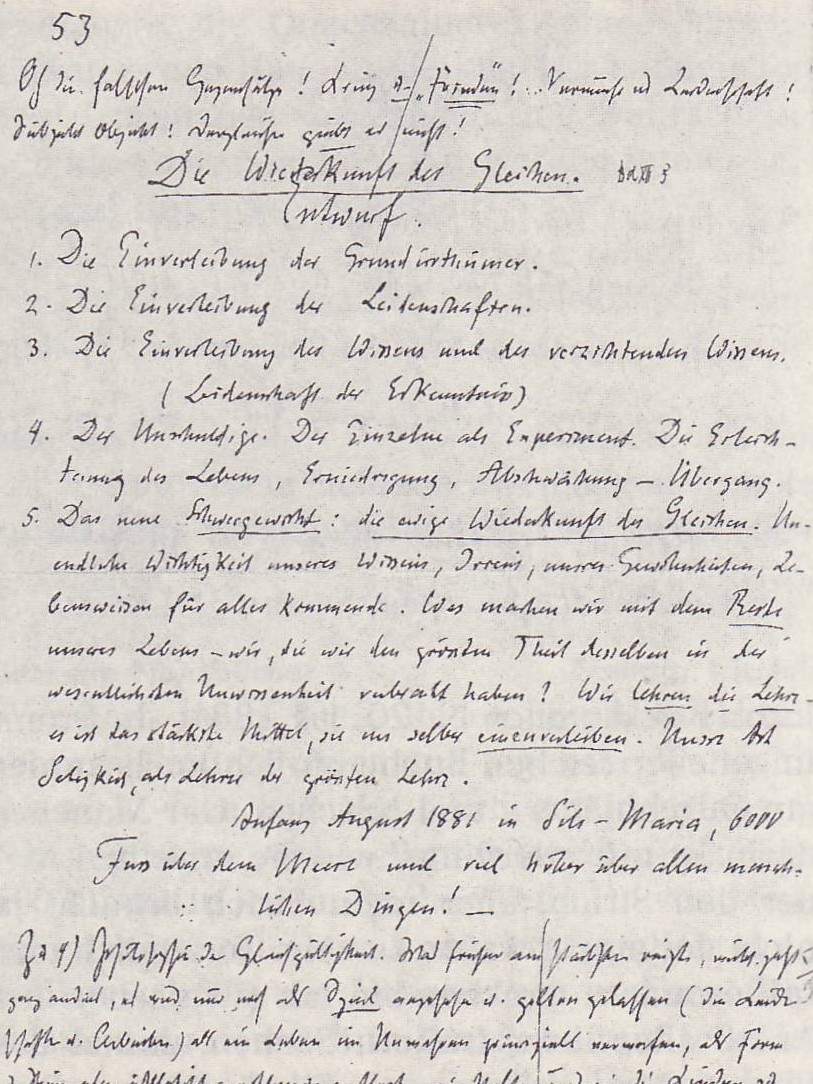
Nietzsche's first note on the "eternal recurrence," written "at the beginning of August 1881 in Sils-Maria, 6000 ft above sea level and much higher above all human regards! -" Nachlass, notebook M III 1, p. 53.

Nietzsche was born into, and largely remained within, the Bildungsbürgertum, a sort of highly cultivated middle class. By the time he was a teenager, he had been writing music and poetry. His aunt Rosalie gave him a biography of Alexander von Humboldt for his 15th birthday, and reading this inspired a love of learning "for its own sake." The schools he attended, the books he read, and his general milieu fostered and inculcated his interests in Bildung, a concept at least tangential to many in Zarathustra, and he worked extremely hard. He became an outstanding philologist almost accidentally, and he renounced his ideas about being an artist. As a philologist he became particularly sensitive to the transmissions and modifications of ideas, which also bears relevance into Zarathustra. Nietzsche's growing distaste toward philology, however, was yoked with his growing taste toward philosophy. As a student, this yoke was his work with Diogenes Laertius. Even with that work he strongly opposed received opinion. With subsequent and properly philosophical work he continued to oppose received opinion. His books leading up to Zarathustra have been described as nihilistic destruction. Such nihilistic destruction combined with his increasing isolation and the rejection of his marriage proposals (to Lou Andreas-Salomé) devastated him. While he was working on Thus Spoke Zarathustra he was walking very often. The imagery of his walks mingled with his physical and emotional and intellectual pains and his prior decades of hard work. What "erupted" was Thus Spoke Zarathustra.

Nietzsche has said that the central idea of Thus Spoke Zarathustra is the eternal recurrence. He has also said that this central idea first occurred to him in August 1881: he was near a "pyramidal block of stone" while walking through the woods along the shores of Lake Silvaplana in the Upper Engadine, and he made a small note that read "6,000 feet beyond man and time."

A few weeks after meeting this idea, he paraphrased in a notebook something written by Friedrich von Hellwald about Zarathustra. This paraphrase was developed into the beginning of Thus Spoke Zarathustra.

A year and a half after making that paraphrase, Nietzsche was living in Rapallo. Nietzsche claimed that the entire first part was conceived, and that Zarathustra himself "came over him", while walking. He was regularly walking "the magnificent road to Zoagli" and "the whole Bay of Santa Margherita". He said in a letter that the entire first part "was conceived in the course of strenuous hiking: absolute certainty, as if every sentence were being called out to me".

Nietzsche returned to "the sacred place" in the summer of 1883 and he "found" the second part. Nietzsche was in Nice the following winter and he "found" the third part.

According to Nietzsche in Ecce Homo it was "scarcely one year for the entire work," and ten days each part. More broadly, however, he said in a letter: "The whole of Zarathustra is an explosion of forces that have been accumulating for decades."

In January 1884, Nietzsche finished the third part and thought the book finished. But by November he expected a fourth part to be finished by January. He also mentioned a fifth and sixth part leading to Zarathustra's death, "or else he will give me no peace". But after the fourth part was finished he called it "a fourth (and last) part of Zarathustra, a kind of sublime finale, which is not at all meant for the public."

The first three parts were initially published individually and were first published together in a single volume in 1887. The fourth part was written in 1885. While Nietzsche retained mental capacity and was involved in the publication of his works, forty copies of the fourth part were printed at his own expense and distributed to his closest friends, to whom he expressed "a vehement desire never to have the Fourth Part made public." In 1889, however, Nietzsche became significantly incapacitated. In March 1892 part four was published separately, and the following July the four parts were published in a single volume.

== Character of Zarathustra ==
In the 1888 Ecce Homo, Nietzsche explains what he meant by making the Persian figure of Zoroaster the protagonist of his book:

People have never asked me as they should have done, what the name of Zarathustra precisely meant in my mouth, in the mouth of the first immoralist; for that which distinguishes this Persian from all others in the past is the very fact that he was the exact reverse of an immoralist. Zarathustra was the first to see in the struggle between good and evil the essential wheel in the working of things. The translation of morality into the realm of metaphysics, as force, cause, end-in-itself, is his work. But the very question suggests its own answer. Zarathustra created this most portentous of all errors,—morality; therefore he must be the first to expose it. Not only because he has had longer and greater experience of the subject than any other thinker,—all history is indeed the experimental refutation of the theory of the so-called moral order of things,—but because of the more important fact that Zarathustra was the most truthful of thinkers. In his teaching alone is truthfulness upheld as the highest virtue—that is to say, as the reverse of the cowardice of the "idealist" who takes to his heels at the sight of reality. Zarathustra has more pluck in his body than all other thinkers put together. To tell the truth and to aim straight: that is the first Persian virtue. Have I made myself clear? ... The overcoming of morality by itself, through truthfulness, the moralist's overcoming of himself in his opposite—in me—that is what the name Zarathustra means in my mouth.

— Ecce Homo, "Why I Am a Fatality"

Thus, "[a]s Nietzsche admits himself, by choosing the name of Zarathustra as the prophet of his philosophy in a poetical idiom, he wanted to pay homage to the original Aryan prophet as a prominent founding figure of the spiritual-moral phase in human history, and reverse his teachings at the same time, according to his fundamental critical views on morality. The original Zoroastrian world-view interpreted being on the basis of the universality of the moral values and saw the whole world as an arena of the struggle between two fundamental moral elements, Good and Evil, depicted in two antagonistic divine figures [Ahura Mazda and Ahriman]. Nietzsche’s Zarathustra, in contrast, puts forward his ontological immoralism and tries to prove and reestablish the primordial innocence of beings by destroying philosophically all moralistic interpretations and evaluations of being".

== Synopsis ==
=== First part ===
The book begins with a prologue that sets up many of the themes that will be explored throughout the work. Zarathustra is introduced as a hermit who has lived ten years on a mountain with his two companions, an eagle and a serpent. One morning – inspired by the sun, which he describes as happy only when it shines upon others – Zarathustra returns to his human community to share his wisdom. Upon descending the mountain, he encounters an old holy man living in the forest, who spends his days praising God. Zarathustra marvels that the man has not yet heard that "God is dead".

Arriving at the nearest town, Zarathustra addresses a crowd that has gathered to watch a tightrope walker. He tells them that mankind's goal must be to create something superior to itself – a new type of human, the Übermensch. All men, he says, must be prepared to will their own destruction in order to bring the Übermensch into being. The crowd greets this speech with scorn and mockery, and the tightrope show begins, high above the audience. When the rope-dancer is halfway across, a clown comes up behind him, urging him to get out of the way. The clown then leaps over the rope-dancer, causing the latter to lose balance and plummet to the ground. The crowd scatters, but Zarathustra stays with the fatally injured tightrope performer and implies that he admires him for having chosen such a dangerous livelihood. Zarathustra later takes the corpse of the rope-dancer on his shoulders into the forest and lays it in a hollow tree. He decides that from this point on, he will no longer attempt to speak to the masses, but only to a few chosen disciples.

There follows a series of discourses in which Zarathustra overturns many of the precepts of Christian morality. He gathers a group of disciples, but ultimately abandons them, saying that he will not return until they have disowned him.

=== Second part ===
Zarathustra retires to his mountain cave, and several years pass by. One night, he dreams that he looks into a mirror and sees the face of a devil instead of his own; he takes this as a sign that his doctrines are being distorted by his enemies, and joyfully descends the mountain to recover his lost disciples.

More discourses follow, which continue to develop the themes of the death of God and the rise of the Übermensch, and also introduce the concept of the will to power. There are hints, however, that Zarathustra is holding something back. A series of dreams and visions prompt him to reveal this secret teaching, but he cannot bring himself to do so. He withdraws from his disciples once more, in order to perfect himself.

=== Third part ===
While journeying home, Zarathustra is waylaid by the spirit of gravity, a dwarf-like creature which clings to his back and whispers taunts into his ear. Zarathustra at first becomes despondent, but then takes courage; he challenges the spirit to hear the "abysmal thought" which he has so far refrained from speaking. This is the doctrine of eternal recurrence. Time, says Zarathustra, is infinite, stretching both forward and backward into eternity. This means that everything that happens now must have happened before, and that every moment must continue to repeat itself eternally.

As he speaks, Zarathustra hears a dog howl in terror, and then he sees a new vision – a shepherd choking on a black serpent which has crept into his throat. At Zarathustra's urging, the shepherd bites the serpent's head off and spits it out. In that moment, the shepherd is transformed into a laughing, radiant being, something greater than human.

Zarathustra continues his journey, delivering more discourses inspired by his observations. Arriving at his mountain cave, he remains there for some time, reflecting on his mission. He is disgusted at humanity's pettiness, and despairs at the thought of the eternal recurrence of such an insignificant race. Eventually, however, he discovers his own longing for eternity, and sings a song in celebration of eternal return.

=== Fourth part ===
Zarathustra begins to grow old as he remains secluded in his cave. One day, he is visited by a soothsayer, who says that he has come to tempt Zarathustra to his final sin – compassion (mitleiden, which can also be translated as "pity"). A loud cry of distress is heard, and the soothsayer tells Zarathustra that "the higher man" is calling to him. Zarathustra is alarmed, and rushes to the aid of the higher man.

Searching through his domain for the person who uttered the cry for help, Zarathustra encounters a series of characters representative of various aspects of humanity. He engages each of them in conversation, and ends by inviting each one to await his return in his cave. After a day's search, however, he is unable to find the higher man. Returning home, he hears the cry of distress once more, now coming from inside his own cave. He realises that all the people he has spoken to that day are collectively the higher man. Welcoming them to his home, he nevertheless tells them that they are not the men he has been waiting for; they are only the precursors of the Übermensch.

Zarathustra hosts a supper for his guests, which is enlivened by songs and arguments, and ends in the facetious worship of a donkey. The higher men thank Zarathustra for relieving them of their distress and teaching them to be content with life as they affirm Zarathustra's teaching of eternal recurrence.

The following morning, outside his cave, Zarathustra encounters a lion and a flock of doves, which he interprets as a sign that those whom he calls his children are near. As the higher men emerge from the cave, the lion roars at them, causing them to cry out and flee. Their cry reminds Zarathustra of the soothsayer's prediction that he would be tempted into feeling pity for the higher man (this being Zarathustra's final sin). He declares that this is over, and that from this time forward he will think of nothing but his work. Thus speaks Zarathustra as he leaves his cave, glowing and as strong as the sun.

== Themes ==
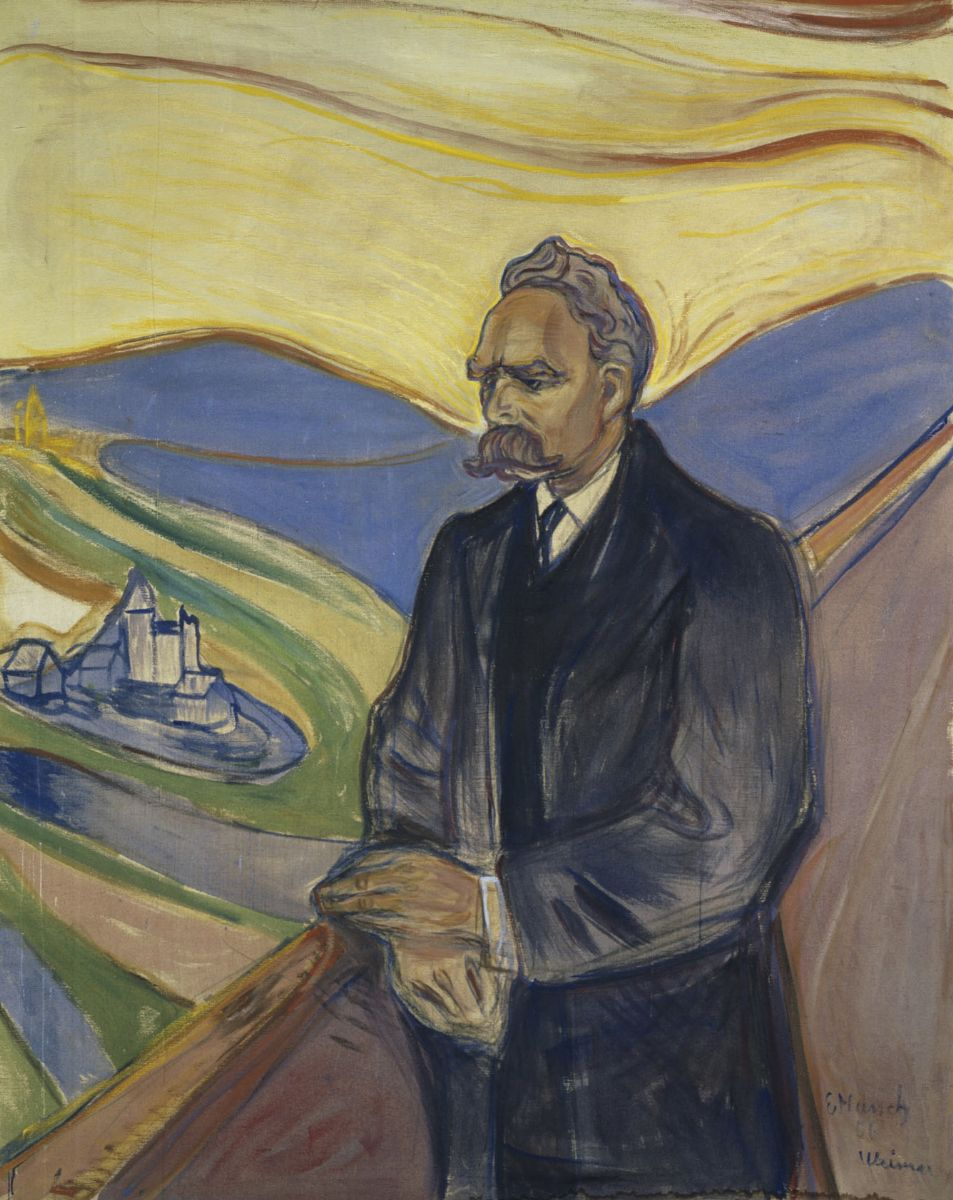
Friedrich Nietzsche, Edvard Munch, 1906

Scholars have argued that "the worst possible way to understand Zarathustra is as a teacher of doctrines". Nonetheless Thus Spoke Zarathustra "has contributed most to the public perception of Nietzsche as philosopher – namely, as the teacher of the 'doctrines' of the will to power, the overman and the eternal return".

=== Will to power ===
Nietzsche's thinking was significantly influenced by the thinking of Arthur Schopenhauer. Schopenhauer emphasised will, and particularly will to live. Nietzsche emphasised Wille zur Macht, or will to power.

Nietzsche was not a systematic philosopher and left much of what he wrote open to interpretation. Receptive fascists are said to have misinterpreted the will to power, having overlooked Nietzsche's distinction between Kraft ‘force, strength’ and Macht ‘power, might’.

Scholars have often had recourse to Nietzsche's notebooks, where will to power is described in ways such as "willing-to-become-stronger [Stärker-werden-wollen], willing growth".

=== Übermensch ===
It is allegedly "well-known that as a term, Nietzsche’s Übermensch derives from Lucian of Samosata's hyperanthropos". This hyperanthropos, or "overman," appears in Lucian's Menippean satire Κατάπλους ἢ Τύραννος, usually translated Downward Journey or The Tyrant. This hyperanthropos is "imagined to be superior to others of 'lesser' station in this-worldly life and the same tyrant after his (comically unwilling) transport into the underworld". Nietzsche celebrated Goethe as an actualisation of the Übermensch.

=== Eternal recurrence ===
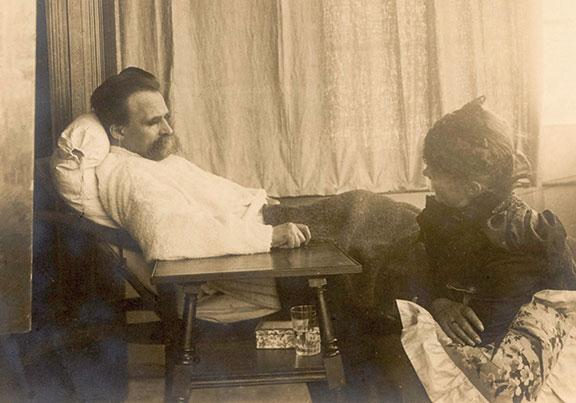
Nietzsche in the care of his sister in 1899

Nietzsche includes some brief writings on eternal recurrence in his earlier book The Gay Science. Zarathustra also appears in that book. In Thus Spoke Zarathustra, the eternal recurrence is, according to Nietzsche, the "fundamental idea of the work".

Interpretations of the eternal recurrence have mostly revolved around cosmological and attitudinal and normative principles.

As a cosmological principle, it has been supposed to mean that time is circular, that all things recur eternally. A weak attempt at proof has been noted in Nietzsche's notebooks, and it is not clear to what extent, if at all, Nietzsche believed in the truth of it. Critics have mostly dealt with the cosmological principle as a puzzle of why Nietzsche might have touted the idea.

As an attitudinal principle it has often been dealt with as a thought experiment, to see how one would react, or as a sort of ultimate expression of life-affirmation, as if one should desire eternal recurrence.

As a normative principle, it has been thought of as a measure or standard, akin to a "moral rule".

=== Criticism of religion ===
Nietzsche studied extensively and was very familiar with Schopenhauer and Christianity and Buddhism, each of which he considered nihilistic and "enemies to a healthy culture". Thus Spoke Zarathustra can be understood as a "polemic" against these influences.

Though Nietzsche "probably learned Sanskrit while at Leipzig from 1865 to 1868", and "was probably one of the best read and most solidly grounded in Buddhism for his time among Europeans", Nietzsche was writing when Eastern thought was only beginning to be acknowledged in the West, and Eastern thought was easily misconstrued. Nietzsche's interpretations of Buddhism were coloured by his study of Schopenhauer, and it is "clear that Nietzsche, as well as Schopenhauer, entertained inaccurate views of Buddhism". An egregious example has been the idea of śūnyatā as "nothingness" rather than "emptiness". "Perhaps the most serious misreading we find in Nietzsche's account of Buddhism was his inability to recognize that the Buddhist doctrine of emptiness was an initiatory stage leading to a reawakening". Nietzsche dismissed Schopenhauer and Christianity and Buddhism as pessimistic and nihilistic, but, according to Benjamin A. Elman, "[w]hen understood on its own terms, Buddhism cannot be dismissed as pessimistic or nihilistic". Moreover, answers which Nietzsche assembled to the questions he was asking, not only generally but also in Zarathustra, put him "very close to some basic doctrines found in Buddhism". An example is when Zarathustra says that "the soul is only a word for something about the body".

=== Nihilism ===
One of the most vexed points in discussions of Nietzsche has been whether or not he was a nihilist. Though arguments have been made for either side, what is clear is that Nietzsche was at least interested in nihilism.

As far as nihilism touched other people, at least, metaphysical understandings of the world were progressively undermined until people could contend that "God is dead". Without God, humanity was greatly devalued. Without metaphysical or supernatural lenses, humans could be seen as animals with primitive drives which were or could be sublimated. According to Hollingdale, this led to Nietzsche's ideas about the will to power. Likewise, "Sublimated will to power was now the Ariadne's thread tracing the way out of the labyrinth of nihilism".

== Style ==
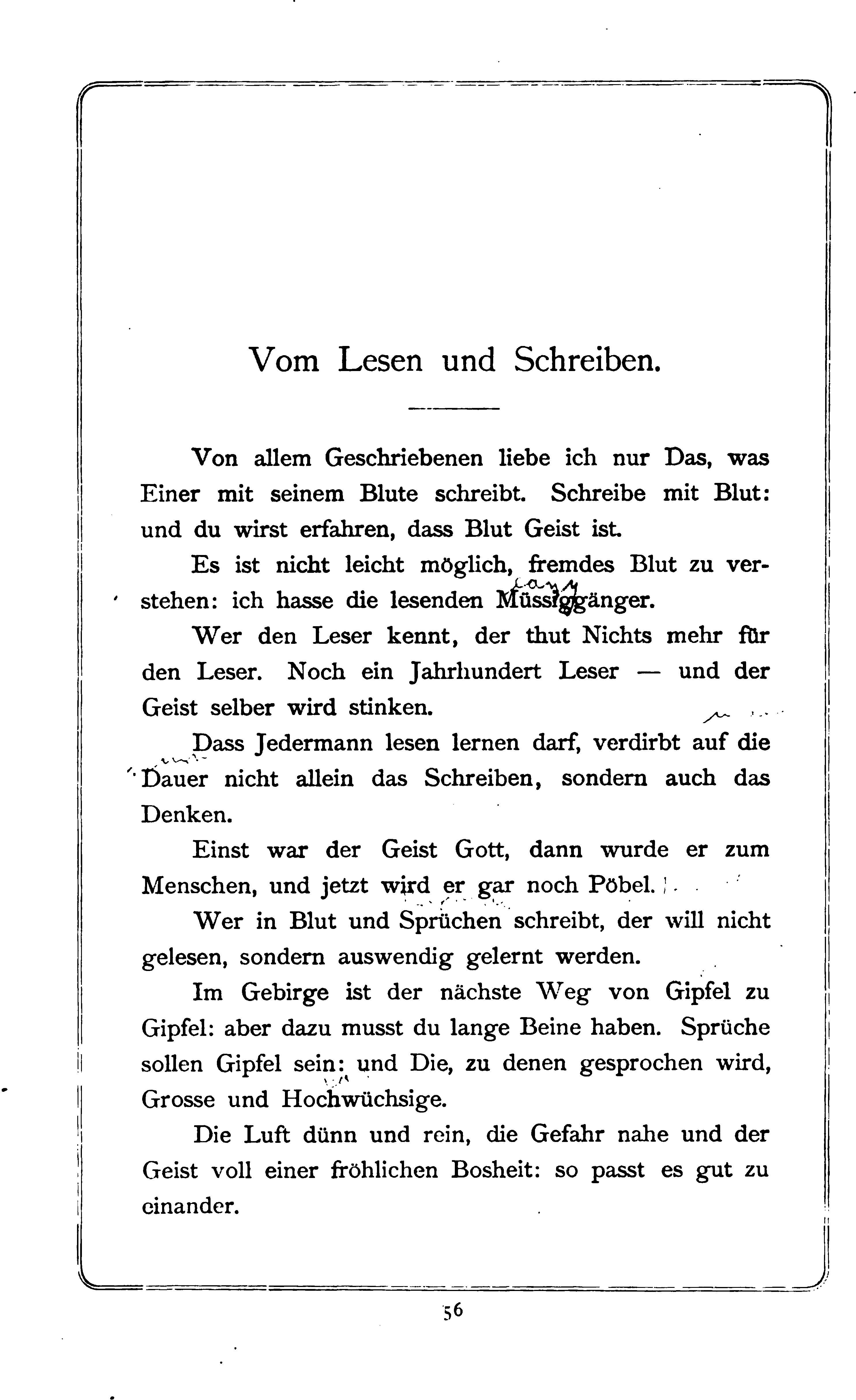
"On Reading and Writing. Of all that is written, I love only that which one writes with one's own blood". Thus Spoke Zarathustra, The Complete Works of Friedrich Nietzsche, Volume VI, 1899, C. G. Naumann, Leipzig.

The nature of the text is musical and operatic. While working on it Nietzsche wrote "of his aim 'to become Wagner's heir'". Nietzsche thought of it as akin to a symphony or opera. Gustav Mahler, whose Third Symphony quotes a poem from the book, remarked that "Zarathustra was born completely from the spirit of music, and is even 'symphonically constructed'". Nietzsche

later draws special attention to "the tempo of Zarathustra's speeches" and their "delicate slowness" – "from an infinite fullness of light and depth of happiness drop falls after drop, word after word" – as well as the necessity of "hearing properly the tone that issues from his mouth, this halcyon tone".

The length of paragraphs and the punctuation and the repetitions all enhance the musicality.

The title is Thus Spoke Zarathustra. Much of the book is what Zarathustra said. What Zarathustra says

is throughout so highly parabolic, metaphorical, and aphoristic. Rather than state various claims about virtues and the present age and religion and aspirations, Zarathustra speaks about stars, animals, trees, tarantulas, dreams, and so forth. Explanations and claims are almost always analogical and figurative.

Nietzsche would often appropriate masks and models to develop himself and his thoughts and ideas, and to find voices and names through which to communicate. While writing Zarathustra, Nietzsche was particularly influenced by "the language of Luther and the poetic form of the Bible". But Zarathustra also frequently alludes to or appropriates from Hölderlin's Hyperion and Goethe's Faust and Emerson's Essays, among other things. It is generally agreed that the sorcerer is based on Wagner and the soothsayer is based on Schopenhauer.

The original text contains a great deal of word-play. For instance, words beginning with über ('over, above') and unter ('down, below') are often paired to emphasise the contrast, which is not always possible to bring out in translation, except by coinages. An example is untergang (lit. 'down-going'), which is used in German to mean 'setting' (as in, of the sun), but also 'sinking', 'demise', 'downfall', or 'doom'. Nietzsche pairs this word with its opposite übergang ('over-going'), used to mean 'transition'. Another example is übermensch ('overman' or 'superman').

Nietzsche's style is figuratively and metaphorically rich with complex ideas that may let the reader find them hard to interpret. He does not follow a straightforward philosophical discourse; instead, he uses poetic, rhetorical narratives to convey Zarathustra's development of character. This richness of language can be ambiguous for readers to understand because it includes paradoxes, contradictions and parables, which requires "literary interpretations to unpack the language".

== Reception ==
Nietzsche considered Thus Spoke Zarathustra his magnum opus, writing:

With [Thus Spoke Zarathustra] I have given mankind the greatest present that has ever been made to it so far. This book, with a voice bridging centuries, is not only the highest book there is, the book that is truly characterized by the air of the heights—the whole fact of man lies beneath it at a tremendous distance—it is also the deepest, born out of the innermost wealth of truth, an inexhaustible well to which no pail descends without coming up again filled with gold and goodness.

— Ecce Homo, "Preface" §4, translated by W. Kaufmann

In a letter of February 1884, he wrote:

With Zarathustra I believe I have brought the German language to its culmination. After Luther and Goethe there was still a third step to be made.

To this, Parkes has said: "Many scholars believe that Nietzsche managed to make that step". Still, critical opinion varies extremely: the book has variously been described by other commentators as "a masterpiece of literature as well as philosophy" and "in large part a failure".

The style of the book, along with its ambiguity and paradoxical nature, has helped its eventual enthusiastic reception by the reading public but has frustrated academic attempts at analysis (as Nietzsche may have intended). Thus Spoke Zarathustra remained unpopular as a topic for scholars (especially those in the Anglo-American analytic tradition) until the latter half of the 20th century brought widespread interest in Nietzsche and his unconventional style.

The critic Harold Bloom criticized Thus Spoke Zarathustra in The Western Canon (1994), calling it "a gorgeous disaster" and "unreadable". Other commentators have suggested that Nietzsche's style is intentionally ironic for much of the book.

== English translations ==
The first English translation of Zarathustra was published in 1896 by Alexander Tille.

=== Common (1909) ===
Thomas Common published a translation in 1909 which was based on Alexander Tille's earlier attempt.

Kaufmann's introduction to his own translation included a blistering critique of Common's version; he notes that in one instance, Common has taken the German "most evil" and rendered it "baddest", a particularly unfortunate error not merely for his having coined the term "baddest", but also because Nietzsche dedicated a third of The Genealogy of Morals to the difference between "bad" and "evil". This and other errors led Kaufmann to wonder whether Common "had little German and less English".

The German text available to Common was considerably flawed.

From Zarathustra's Prologue:

The Superman is the meaning of the earth. Let your will say: The Superman shall be the meaning of the earth!
I conjure you, my brethren, remain true to the earth, and believe not those who speak unto you of superearthly hopes! Poisoners are they, whether they know it or not.

=== Kaufmann (1954) and Hollingdale (1961) ===
The Common translation remained widely accepted until more critical translations, titled Thus Spoke Zarathustra, were published by Walter Kaufmann in 1954, and R.J. Hollingdale in 1961.

Clancy Martin states the German text from which Hollingdale and Kaufmann worked was untrue to Nietzsche's own work in some ways. Martin criticizes Kaufmann for changing punctuation, altering literal and philosophical meanings, and dampening some of Nietzsche's more controversial metaphors. Kaufmann's version, which has become the most widely available, features a translator's note suggesting that Nietzsche's text would have benefited from an editor; Martin suggests that Kaufmann "took it upon himself to become [Nietzsche's] editor".

Kaufmann, from Zarathustra's Prologue:

The overman is the meaning of the earth. Let your will say: the overman shall be the meaning of the earth! I beseech you, my brothers, remain faithful to the earth, and do not believe those who speak to you of otherworldly hopes! Poison-mixers are they, whether they know it or not.

Hollingdale, from Zarathustra's Prologue:

The Superman is the meaning of the earth. Let your will say: the Superman shall be the meaning of the earth!
I entreat you, my brothers, remain true to the earth, and do not believe those who speak to you of superterrestrial hopes! They are poisoners, whether they know it or not.

=== 21st-century translations ===
==== Parkes (2005) ====
Graham Parkes describes his own 2005 translation as trying to convey the musicality of the text.

==== Del Caro (2006) ====
In 2006, Cambridge University Press published a translation by Adrian Del Caro (edited by Del Caro and Robert Pippin); this edition aims to restore the original versification of Nietzsche's text and "capture its poetic brilliance", in the words of the publisher.

== Selected editions ==
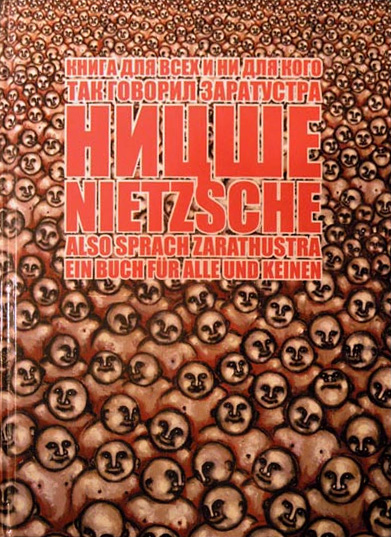
The book Thus Spoke Zarathustra with pictures by Lena Hades in German and Russian

=== English ===
- Thus Spake Zarathustra, translated by Alexander Tille. New York: Macmillan. 1896.
- Thus Spake Zarathustra, trans. Thomas Common. Edinburgh: T. N. Foulis. 1909.
- Thus Spoke Zarathustra, trans. Walter Kaufmann. New York: Random House. 1954.
  - Reprints: In The Portable Nietzsche, New York: Viking Press. 1954; Harmondsworth: Penguin Books. 1976
- Thus Spoke Zarathustra, trans. R. J. Hollingdale. Harmondsworth: Penguin Books. 1961.
- Thus Spoke Zarathustra, trans. Graham Parkes. Oxford: Oxford World's Classics. 2005.
- Thus Spoke Zarathustra, trans. Clancy Martin. Barnes & Noble Books. 2005.
- Thus Spoke Zarathustra, trans. Adrian del Caro and edited by Robert Pippin. Cambridge: Cambridge University Press. 2006.
- Thus Spake Zarathustra, trans. Michael Hulse. New York Review Books. 2022.

=== German ===
- Also sprach Zarathustra, edited by Giorgio Colli and Mazzino Montinari. Munich: Deutscher Taschenbuch Verlag (study edition of the standard German Nietzsche edition).
- Also sprach Zarathustra (bilingual ed.) (in German and Russian), with 20 oil paintings by Lena Hades. Moscow: Institute of Philosophy, Russian Academy of Sciences. 2004. ISBN 5-9540-0019-0.

== See also ==
- Also sprach Zarathustra (Richard Strauss' tone poem, inspired by Nietzsche's work)
- A Mass of Life, a cantata by Frederick Delius
- Faith in the Earth
- Gathas (Hymns of Zoroaster)
- Influence and reception of Friedrich Nietzsche
- Nietzsche and Buddhism
- Nietzsche on the Manusmriti (Ancient text, otherwise known as Mānava-Dharmaśāstra or Laws of Manu).
- Philosophy of Friedrich Nietzsche
