= Zarathustra's roundelay =

Poem in the book Thus Spoke Zarathustra

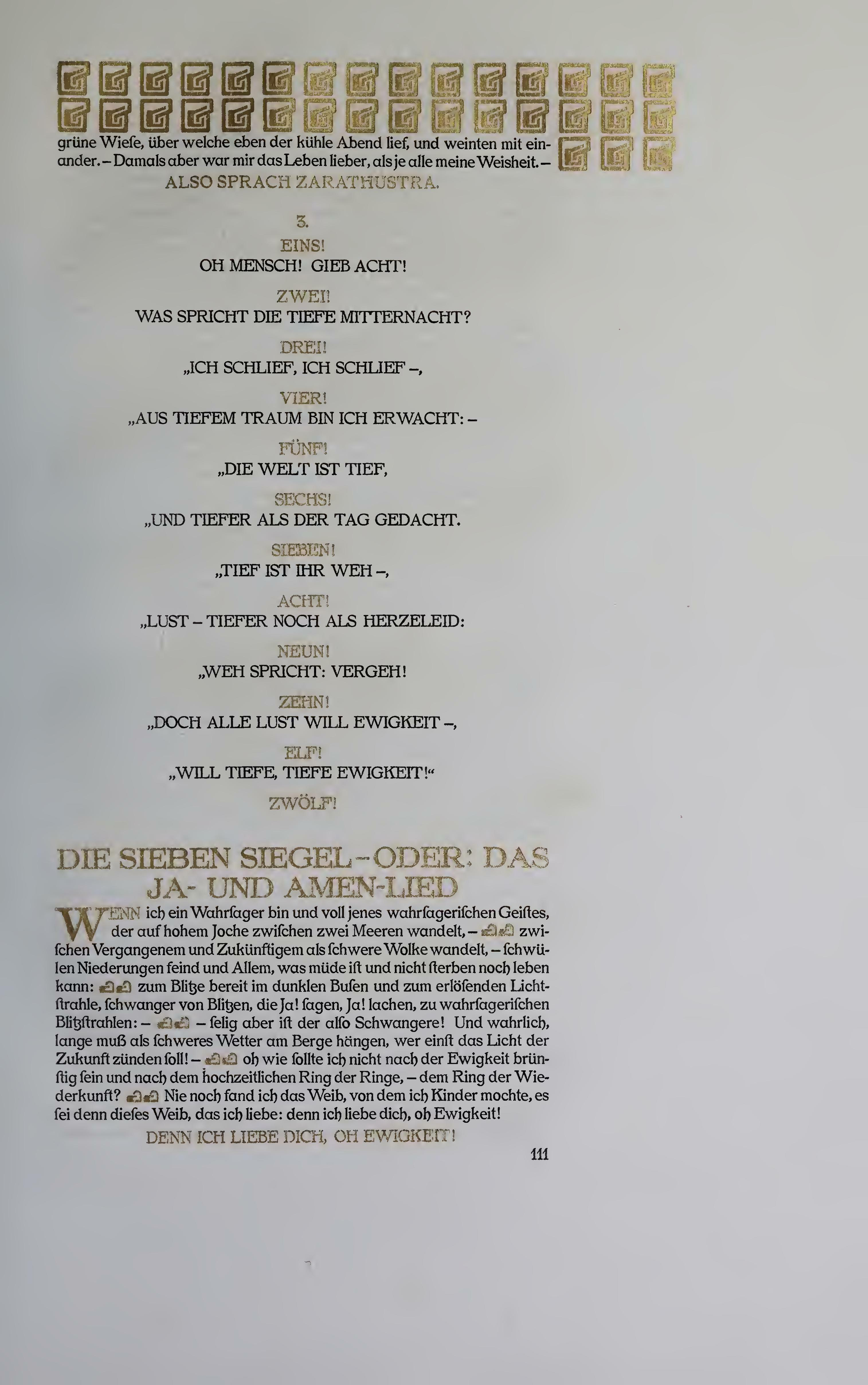
First instance of the poem, within Thus Spoke Zarathustra, in German

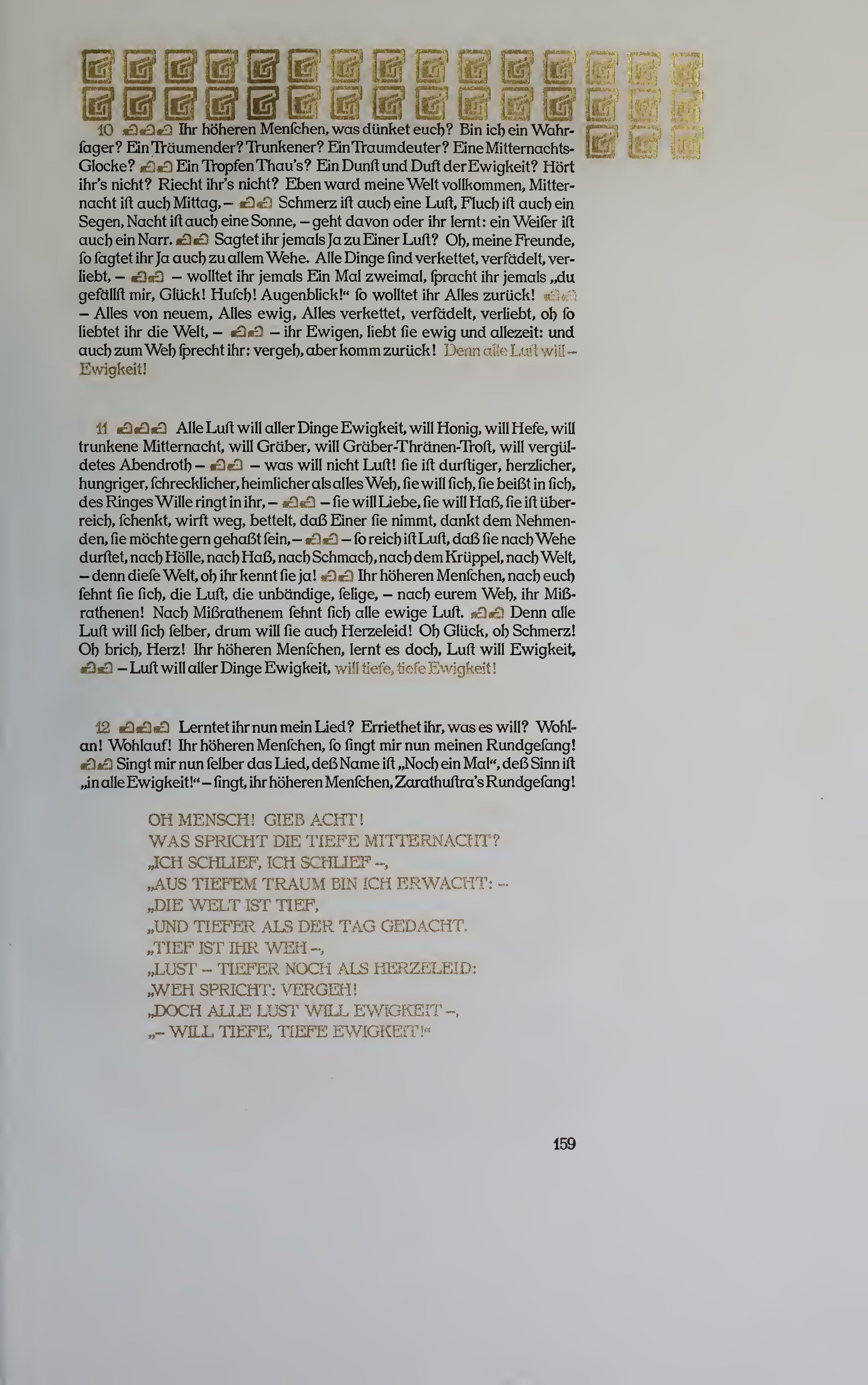
Second instance of the poem, within Thus Spoke Zarathustra, in German

"Zarathustra's roundelay" (German: Zarathustra's Rundgesang), also called the "Midnight Song" (Mitternachts-Lied) or "Once More" (German: Noch ein Mal), is a poem in the book Thus Spoke Zarathustra (1883–1885) by Friedrich Nietzsche.

The poem first appears in Thus Spoke Zarathustra's chapter "The Second Dance-Song", then reappears in a later chapter, "The Drunken Song".

The poem was used by Gustav Mahler as the text of the 4th movement of his Symphony No 3.

== German original ==
O Mensch! Gib acht!
Was spricht die tiefe Mitternacht?
»Ich schlief, ich schlief—,
Aus tiefem Traum bin ich erwacht:—
Die Welt ist tief,
Und tiefer als der Tag gedacht.
Tief ist ihr Weh—,
Lust—tiefer noch als Herzeleid:
Weh spricht: Vergeh!
Doch alle Lust will Ewigkeit—,
—will tiefe, tiefe Ewigkeit!«

== Selected English translations ==
Alexander Tille:

O man! Lose not sight!
What saith the deep midnight?
"I lay in sleep, in sleep;
From deep dream I come to light.
The world is deep,
And deeper than ever day thought it might.
Deep is its woe—
And deeper still than woe—delight.
Saith woe: 'Pass, go!
Eternity's sought by all delight—,
Eternity deep—by all delight!'"

Thomas Common:

O man! Take heed!
What saith deep midnight's voice indeed?
"I slept my sleep—
"From deepest dream I've woke and plead:—
"The world is deep,
"And deeper than the day could read.
"Deep is its woe—
"Joy—deeper still than grief can be:
"Woe saith: Hence! Go!
"But joys all want eternity—
"Want deep profound eternity!"

== See also ==
- Philosophy of Friedrich Nietzsche
  - God is dead
  - Apollonian and Dionysian
