= Beyond Good and Evil =

1886 book by Friedrich Nietzsche

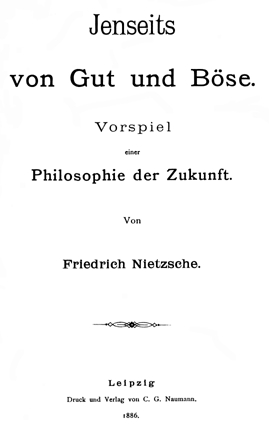
- Title page of the first edition.
- Author: Friedrich Nietzsche
- Original title: Jenseits von Gut und Böse. Vorspiel einer Philosophie der Zukunft
- Language: German
- Subject: Morality, metaphysics
- Published: 1886
- Publication place: Germany
- Media type: Print
- Preceded by: Thus Spoke Zarathustra
- Followed by: On the Genealogy of Morality
- Text: Beyond Good and Evil at Wikisource

Beyond Good and Evil: Prelude to a Philosophy of the Future (German: Jenseits von Gut und Böse: Vorspiel einer Philosophie der Zukunft) is a book by philosopher Friedrich Nietzsche that covers ideas in his previous work Thus Spoke Zarathustra but with a more polemical approach. It was first published in 1886 under the publishing house C. G. Naumann of Leipzig at the author's own expense and first translated into English by Helen Zimmern, who was two years younger than Nietzsche and knew the author.

According to translator Walter Kaufman, the title refers to the need for moral philosophy to go beyond simplistic black and white moralizing, as contained in statements such as "X is good" or "X is evil". At the beginning of the book (§ 2), Nietzsche attacks the very idea of using strictly opposite terms such as "Good versus Evil".

In Beyond Good and Evil, Nietzsche accuses past philosophers of lacking critical sense and blindly accepting dogmatic premises in their consideration of morality. Specifically, he accuses them of founding grand metaphysical systems upon the faith that the good man is the opposite of the evil man, rather than just a different expression of the same basic impulses that find more direct expression in the evil man. The work moves into the realm "beyond good and evil" in the sense of leaving behind the traditional morality which Nietzsche subjects to a destructive critique in favour of what he regards as an affirmative approach that fearlessly confronts the perspectival nature of knowledge and the perilous condition of the modern individual.

The book is well-known for the often-quoted line: "He who fights with monsters should be careful lest he thereby become a monster. And if thou gaze long into an abyss, the abyss will also gaze into thee."

== Background and themes ==
Of the four "late-period" writings of Nietzsche, Beyond Good and Evil most closely resembles the aphoristic style of his middle period. In it he exposes the deficiencies of those usually called "philosophers" and identifies the qualities of the "new philosophers": imagination, self-assertion, danger, originality, and the "creation of values". He then contests some of the key presuppositions of the old philosophic tradition like "self-consciousness", "knowledge", "truth", and "free will", explaining them as inventions of the moral consciousness. In their place, he offers the "will to power" as an explanation of all behavior; this ties into his "perspective of life", which he regards as "beyond good and evil", denying a universal morality for all human beings. Religion and the master and slave moralities feature prominently as Nietzsche re-evaluates deeply held humanistic beliefs, portraying even domination, appropriation and injury to the weak as not universally objectionable.

In several places of the book, Nietzsche drops hints, and even explicit statements as to what the philosophies of the future must deal with.

== Structure of the work ==
The work consists of a short preface dated to 1885, 296 numbered sections, and an "epode" (or "aftersong") entitled "From High Mountains". Not counting the preface or epode, the main sections are organized into nine parts:

- Part One: On the Prejudices of Philosophers
- Part Two: The Free Spirit
- Part Three: The Religious Mood
- Part Four: Apophthegms and Interludes
- Part Five: The Natural History of Morals
- Part Six: We Scholars
- Part Seven: Our Virtues
- Part Eight: Peoples and Countries
- Part Nine: What is Noble?

== On philosophers, free spirits, and scholars ==
In the opening two parts of the book, Nietzsche discusses, in turn, the philosophers of the past, whom he accuses of a blind dogmatism plagued by moral prejudice masquerading as a search for objective truth; and the "free spirits", like himself, who are to replace them.

He casts doubt on the project of past philosophy by asking why we should want the "truth" rather than recognizing untruth "as a condition of life." He offers an entirely psychological explanation of every past philosophy: each has been an "involuntary and unconscious memoir" on the part of its author (§ 6) and exists to justify his moral prejudices, which he solemnly baptizes as "truths".

In one passage (§ 34), Nietzsche writes that "from every point of view the erroneousness of the world in which we believe we live is the surest and firmest thing we can get our eyes on." Philosophers are wrong to rail violently against the risk of being deceived. "It is no more than a moral prejudice that truth is worth more than appearance." Life is nothing without appearances; it appears to Nietzsche that it follows from this that the abolition of appearances would imply the abolition of "truth" as well. Nietzsche asks the question, "what compels us to assume there exists any essential antithesis between 'true' and 'false'?"

Nietzsche singles out the Stoic precept of "living according to nature" (§ 9) as showing how philosophy "creates the world in its own image" by trying to regiment nature "according to the Stoa." But nature, as something uncontrollable and "prodigal beyond measure," cannot be tyrannized over in the way Stoics tyrannize over themselves. Further, there are forceful attacks on several individual philosophers. Descartes' cogito presupposes that there is an I, that there is such an activity as thinking, and that I know what thinking is (§ 16). Spinoza masks his "personal timidity and vulnerability" by hiding behind his geometrical method (§ 5), and inconsistently makes self-preservation a fundamental drive while rejecting teleology (§ 13). Kant, "the great Chinaman of Königsberg" (§ 210), reverts to the prejudice of an old moralist with his categorical imperative, the dialectical grounding of which is a mere smokescreen (§ 5). His "faculty" to explain the possibility of synthetic a priori judgements is pejoratively compared to a passage from Molière's comedy Le Malade imaginaire in which the narcotic quality of opium is described in terms of a "sleepy faculty" – according to Nietzsche, both Kant's explanation of synthetic a priori judgments and Moliére's comedic description of opium are examples of redundant self-referring statements which do not explain anything. Schopenhauer is mistaken in thinking that the nature of the will is self-evident (§ 19), which is, in fact, a highly complex instrument of control over those who must obey, not transparent to those who command.

"Free spirits", by contrast to the philosophers of the past, are "investigators to the point of cruelty, with rash fingers for the ungraspable, with teeth and stomach for the most indigestible" (§ 44). Nietzsche warns against those who would suffer for the sake of truth and exhorts his readers to shun these indignant sufferers for truth and lend their ears instead to "cynics"—those who "speak 'badly' of man—but do not speak ill of him" (§ 26).

There are kinds of fearless scholars who are truly independent of prejudice (§ 6), but these "philosophical labourers and men of science in general" should not be confused with philosophers, who are "commanders and law-givers" (§ 211).

Nietzsche also subjects physics to critique. "Nature's conformity to law" is merely one interpretation of the phenomena which natural science observes; Nietzsche suggests that the same phenomena could equally be interpreted as demonstrating "the tyrannically ruthless and inexorable enforcement of power-demands" (§ 22). Nietzsche appears to espouse a strong brand of scientific anti-realism when he asserts that "It is we alone who have fabricated causes, succession, reciprocity, relativity, compulsion, number, law, freedom, motive, purpose" (§ 21).

== On morality and religion ==
In the "pre-moral" period of mankind, actions were judged by their consequences. Over the past 10,000 years, however, a morality has developed where actions are judged by their origins (their motivations) not their consequences. This morality of intentions is, according to Nietzsche, a "prejudice" and "something provisional [...] that must be overcome" (§ 32).

Nietzsche criticizes "unegoistic morality" and demands that "Moralities must first of all be forced to bow before order of rank" (§ 221). Every "high culture" begins by recognizing "the pathos of distance" (§ 257).

Nietzsche contrasts southern (Catholic) and northern (Protestant) Christianity; northern Europeans have much less "talent for religion" (§ 48) and lack "southern delicatezza" (§ 50). As elsewhere, Nietzsche praises the Old Testament while disparaging the New Testament (§ 52).

Religion has always been connected to "three dangerous dietary prescriptions: solitude, fasting and sexual abstinence" (§ 47), and has exerted cruelty through demanding sacrifice according to a "ladder" with different rungs of cruelty, which has ultimately caused God himself to be sacrificed (§ 55). Christianity, "the most fatal kind of self-presumption ever", has beaten everything joyful, assertive and autocratic out of man and turned him into a "sublime abortion" (§ 62). If, unlike past philosophers such as Schopenhauer, we really want to tackle the problems of morality, we must "compare many moralities" and "prepare a typology of morals" (§ 186). In a discussion that anticipates On the Genealogy of Morality, Nietzsche claims that "Morality is in Europe today herd-animal morality" (§ 202)—i.e., it emanates from the ressentiment of the slave for the master (see also § 260, which leads into the discussion in Genealogy, I).

Nietzsche argues that more than what they value as "good" distinguishes noble and base. Even where agreement exists over what is good, what men consider a sufficient sign of possessing what is good differs (§ 194). Nietzsche describes love as the desire to possess a woman. The most unrefined form of the desire is also the most readily identifiable as a desire to possess another: control over the woman's body. A subtler desire to possess her also wants her soul, and thus wants her to be willing to sacrifice herself for her lover. Nietzsche describes this as a more complete possession. A still more refined desire to possess her prompts a concern that she might be willing to sacrifice what she desires for a mistaken image of her lover. This leads some lovers to want their women to know them deep down so that their sacrifice really is a sacrifice for them. A similar rank-ordering applies to statesmen, the less refined not caring whether they attain power by fraud, the more refined not taking pleasure in the people's love unless they love the statesman for who he really is. In both cases, the more spiritualized form of the desire to possess also demands one possess what is good more completely.

In § 259, Nietzsche states that to not injure, exploit or be violent to others as a general principle of society is "a Will to the denial of life, a principle of dissolution and decay." He goes on to argue that life is "essentially appropriation, injury, conquest of the strange and weak."

== On nations, peoples and cultures ==
Nietzsche discusses the complexities of the German soul (§ 244), praises the Jews and heavily criticizes the trend of German antisemitism (§ 251). He praises France as "the seat of Europe's most spiritual and refined culture and the leading school of taste" (§ 254). He finds the English coarse, gloomy, more brutal than the Germans, and declares that "they are no philosophical race", singling out Bacon, Hobbes, Hume and Locke as representing a "debasement and devaluation of the concept 'philosopher' for more than a century" (§ 252). Nietzsche also touches on problems of translation and the leaden quality of the German language (§ 28).

In a prophetic statement, Nietzsche proclaims that "The time for petty politics is past: the very next century will bring with it the struggle for mastery over the whole earth" (§ 208).

== Aphorisms and poetry ==
Between § 62 and § 186 Nietzsche inserts a collection of mostly single-sentence aphorisms, modelled on French aphorists such as La Rochefoucauld. Twelve of these (§§ 84, 85, 86, 114, 115, 127, 131, 139, 144, 145, 147, 148) concern women or the distinction between men and women. Other subjects touched on include his doctrine of the eternal recurrence (§ 70), music (§ 106) and utilitarianism (§ 174), among more general attempts at trenchant observations about human nature.

The work concludes with a short ode to friendship in verse form (continuing Nietzsche's use of poetry in The Gay Science and Thus Spoke Zarathustra).

== Editions ==
- Jenseits von Gut und Böse. Zur Genealogie der Moral, edited by Giorgio Colli and Mazzino Montinari, Munich: Deutscher Taschenbuch Verlag, 2002 (study edition of the standard German Nietzsche edition)
- Beyond Good and Evil, translated by Walter Kaufmann, New York: Random House, 1966, ISBN 0-679-72465-6; reprinted by Vintage Books, 1989, ISBN 978-0-679-72465-0, and as part of Basic Writings of Nietzsche, New York: Modern Library, 1992, ISBN 0-679-60000-0
- Beyond Good and Evil, translated by R. J. Hollingdale, Harmondsworth: Penguin Books, 1973; revised reprint 1990 with introduction by Michael Tanner
- Beyond Good and Evil, translated by Helen Zimmern, 1906, reprinted in Courier Dover Publications, New York, 1997, ISBN 0-486-29868-X
- Beyond Good and Evil, translated by Marion Faber, Oxford: Oxford World's Classics, 1998
- Beyond Good and Evil, translated by Judith Norman and edited by Rolf-Peter Horstmann, Cambridge: Cambridge University Press, 2002
- Beyond Good and Evil / On the Genealogy of Morality, translated by Adrian Del Caro, Stanford: Stanford University Press, 2014 (following the Colli/Montinari German edition)
