= Faith in the Earth =

Nietzsche's concept

"Faith in the Earth" is a concept referred to in the German philosopher Friedrich Nietzsche's mytho-poetic formulation of divinity, Thus Spoke Zarathustra.
