= Will to power =

Philosophical concept

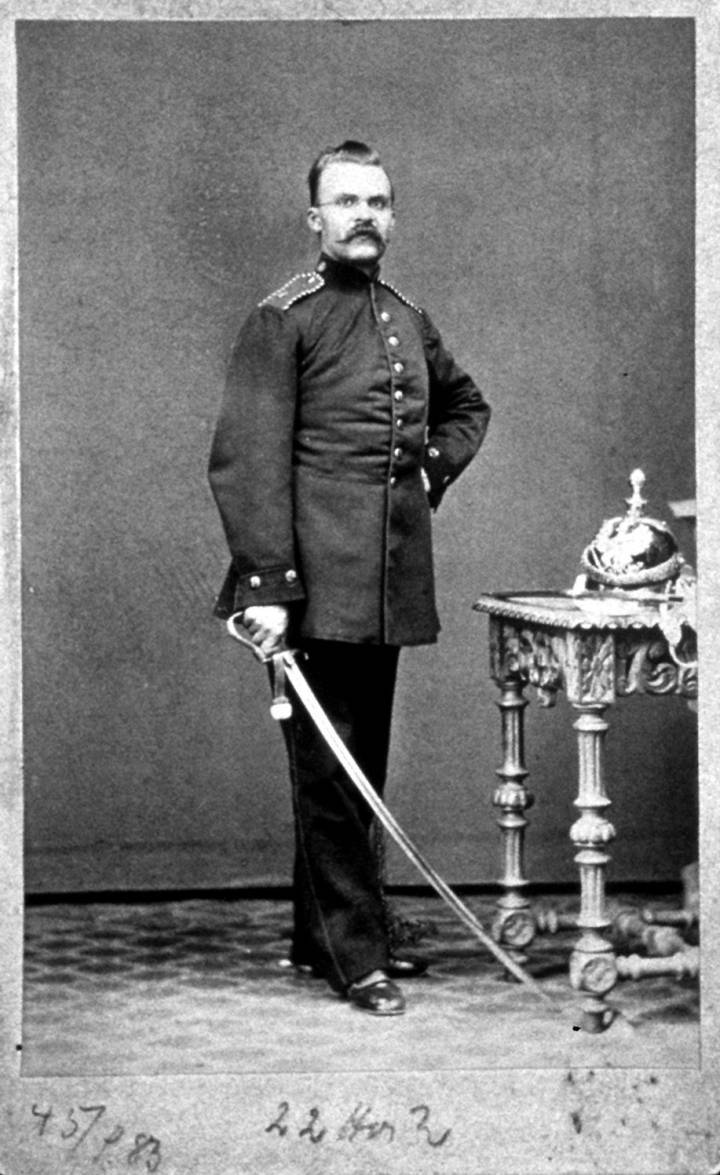
Friedrich Nietzsche in Prussian military attire, 1868

The will to power (German: der Wille zur Macht) is the core concept in the philosophy of Friedrich Nietzsche. The will to power describes what Nietzsche may have believed to be the main driving force in humans. He never systematically defined it, leaving its interpretation open to debate. His use of the term can be summarized as self-determination, the concept of actualizing one's will onto oneself or one's surroundings, and it coincides heavily with egoism.

== Kraft vs. Macht ==
Some of the misconceptions of the will to power, including Nazi appropriation of Nietzsche's philosophy, arise from overlooking Nietzsche's distinction between Kraft ('force' or 'strength') and Macht ('power' or 'might'). Kraft is primordial strength that may be exercised by anything possessing it, while Macht is, within Nietzsche's philosophy, closely tied to sublimation and "self-overcoming", the conscious channeling of Kraft for creative purposes.

== Early influences ==
Nietzsche's early thinking was influenced by that of Arthur Schopenhauer, the German philosopher whom he first discovered in 1865. Schopenhauer puts a central emphasis on will and in particular has a concept of the "will to live". Writing a generation before Nietzsche, he explained that the universe and everything in it is driven by a primordial will to live, which results in a desire in all living creatures to avoid death and to procreate. For Schopenhauer, this will is the most fundamental aspect of reality – more fundamental even than being.

Another important influence was Roger Joseph Boscovich, whom Nietzsche discovered and learned about through his reading, in 1866, of Friedrich Albert Lange's 1865 Geschichte des Materialismus (History of Materialism). As early as 1872, Nietzsche went on to study Boscovich's book Theoria Philosophia Naturalis for himself. Nietzsche makes his only reference in his published works to Boscovich in Beyond Good and Evil, where he declares war on "soul-atomism". Boscovich had rejected the idea of "materialistic atomism", which Nietzsche calls "one of the best refuted theories there is". The idea of centers of force would become central to Nietzsche's later theories of "will to power".

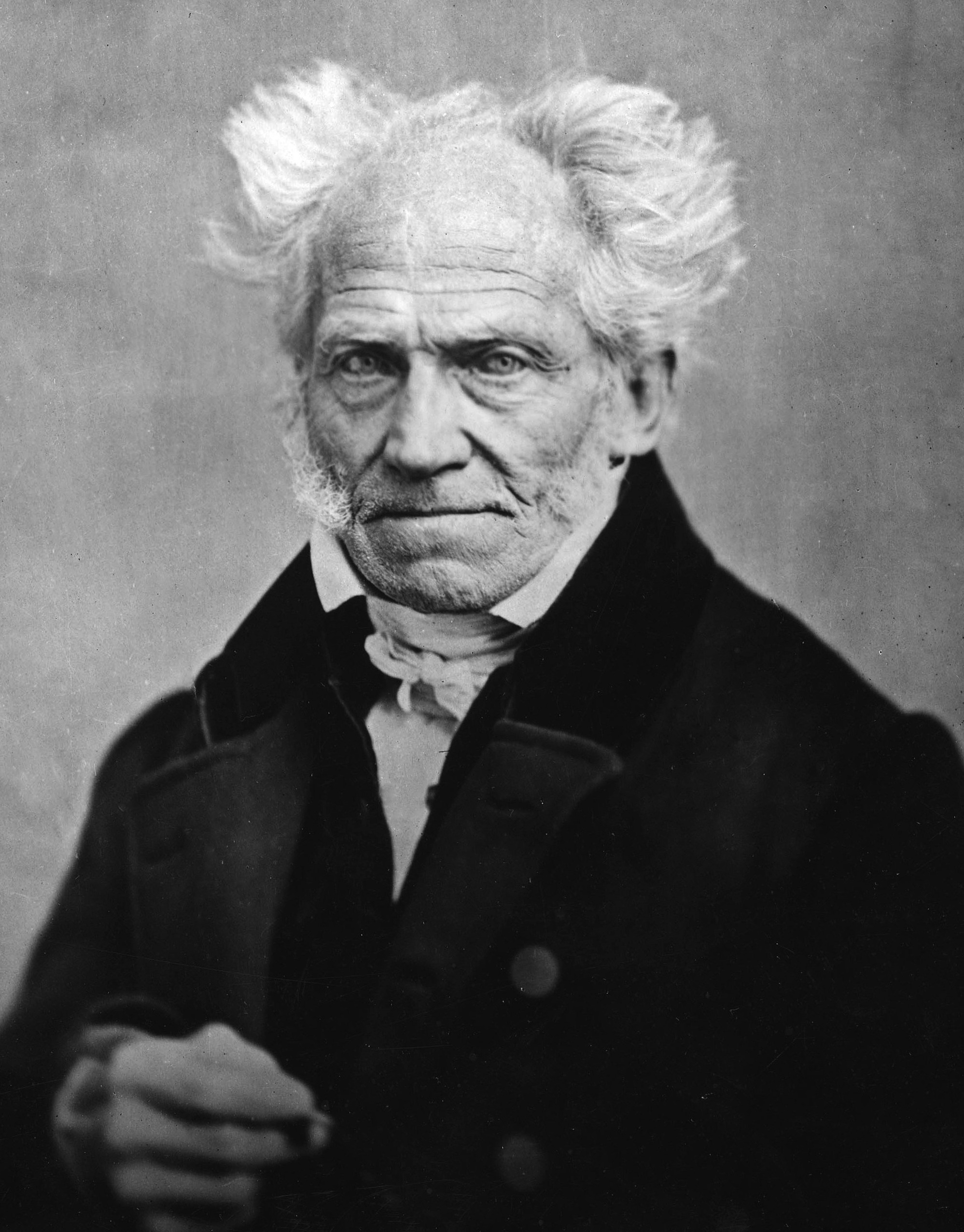
Arthur Schopenhauer's influence on Nietzsche's philosophical thought is noticeably evident in the concept of the will to power

== Appearance of the concept in Nietzsche's work ==
As the 1880s began, Nietzsche began to speak of the "Desire for Power" (Machtgelüst); this appeared in The Wanderer and his Shadow (1880) and Daybreak (1881). Machtgelüst, in these works, is the pleasure of the feeling of power and the hunger to overpower.

Wilhelm Roux published his The Struggle of Parts in the Organism (Der Kampf der Teile im Organismus) in 1881, and Nietzsche first read it that year. The book was a response to Darwinian theory, proposing an alternative mode of evolution. Roux was a disciple of and influenced by Ernst Haeckel, who believed the struggle to survive occurred at the cellular level. The various cells and tissues struggle for finite resources, so that only the strongest survive. Through this mechanism, the body grows stronger and better adapted. Rejecting natural selection, Roux's model assumed a neo-Lamarckian or pangenetic model of inheritance.

Nietzsche began to expand on the concept of Machtgelüst in The Gay Science (1882), where in a section titled "On the doctrine of the feeling of power", he connects the desire for cruelty with the pleasure in the feeling of power. Elsewhere in The Gay Science he notes that it is only "in intellectual beings that pleasure, displeasure, and will are to be found", excluding the vast majority of organisms from the desire for power.

Léon Dumont (1837–77), whose 1875 book Théorie scientifique de la sensibilité, le plaisir et la peine Nietzsche read in 1883, seems to have exerted some influence on this concept. Dumont believed that pleasure is related to increases in force. In The Wanderer and Daybreak, Nietzsche had speculated that pleasures such as cruelty are pleasurable because of exercise of power. But Dumont provided a physiological basis for Nietzsche's speculation. Dumont's theory also would have seemed to confirm Nietzsche's claim that pleasure and pain are reserved for intellectual beings, since, according to Dumont, pain and pleasure require a coming to consciousness and not just a sensing.

In 1883 Nietzsche coined the phrase Wille zur Macht in Thus Spoke Zarathustra. The concept, at this point, was no longer limited to only those intellectual beings that can actually experience the feeling of power; it now applied to all life. The phrase Wille zur Macht first appears in part 1, "1001 Goals" (1883), then in part 2, in two sections, "Self-Overcoming" and "Redemption" (later in 1883). "Self-Overcoming" describes it in most detail, saying it is an "unexhausted procreative will of life". There is will to power where there is life and even the strongest living things will risk their lives for more power. This suggests that the will to power is stronger than the will to survive.

Schopenhauer's will to live (Wille zum Leben) thus became a subsidiary to the will to power, which is the stronger will. Nietzsche thinks his notion of the will to power is far more useful than Schopenhauer's will to live for explaining various events, especially human behavior—for example, Nietzsche uses the will to power to explain both ascetic life-denying impulses and strong life-affirming impulses as well as both master and slave morality. He also finds the will to power to offer much richer explanations than utilitarianism's notion that all people really want to be happy, or the Platonist notion that people want to be unified with the Good.

Nietzsche read William Rolph’s Biologische Probleme around mid-1884, and it clearly interested him, for his copy is heavily annotated. He made many notes concerning Rolph. Rolph was another evolutionary anti-Darwinist like Roux, who wished to argue for evolution by a different mechanism than natural selection. Rolph argued that all life seeks primarily to expand itself. Organisms fulfill this need through assimilation, trying to make as much of what is found around them into part of themselves, for example by seeking to increase intake and nutriment. Life forms are naturally insatiable in this way.

Nietzsche's next published work was Beyond Good and Evil (1886), where the influence of Rolph seems apparent. Nietzsche writes,

Even the body within which individuals treat each other as equals ... will have to be an incarnate will to power, it will strive to grow, spread, seize, become predominant – not from any morality or immorality but because it is living and because life simply is will to power.

Beyond Good and Evil has the most references to "will to power" in his published works, appearing in 11 aphorisms. The influence of Rolph and its connection to "will to power" also continues in book 5 of Gay Science (1887) where Nietzsche describes "will to power" as the instinct for "expansion of power" fundamental to all life.

Carl Nägeli's 1884 book Mechanisch-physiologische Theorie der Abstammungslehre, which Nietzsche acquired around 1886 and subsequently read closely, also had considerable influence on his theory of will to power. Nietzsche wrote a letter to Franz Overbeck about it, noting that it has "been sheepishly put aside by Darwinists". Nägeli believed in a "perfection principle", which led to greater complexity. He called the seat of heritability the idioplasma, and argued, with a military metaphor, that a more complex, complicatedly ordered idioplasma would usually defeat a simpler rival. In other words, he is also arguing for internal evolution, similar to Roux, except emphasizing complexity as the main factor instead of strength.

Thus, Dumont's pleasure in the expansion of power, Roux's internal struggle, Nägeli's drive towards complexity, and Rolph's principle of insatiability and assimilation are fused together into the biological side of Nietzsche's theory of will to power, which is developed in a number of places in his published writings. Having derived the "will to power" from three anti-Darwin evolutionists, as well as Dumont, it seems appropriate that he should use his "will to power" as an anti-Darwinian explanation of evolution. He expresses a number of times the idea that adaptation and the struggle to survive is a secondary drive in the evolution of animals, behind the desire to expand one's power – the "will to power".

Nonetheless, in his notebooks he continues to expand the theory of the will to power. Influenced by his earlier readings of Boscovich, he began to develop a physics of the will to power. The idea of matter as centers of force is translated into matter as centers of will to power. Nietzsche wanted to slough off the theory of matter, which he viewed as a relic of the metaphysics of substance.

These ideas of an all-inclusive physics or metaphysics built upon the will to power do not appear to arise anywhere in his published works or in any of the final books published posthumously, except in the above-mentioned aphorism from Beyond Good & Evil, where he references Boscovich (section 12). It does recur in his notebooks, but not all scholars treat these ideas as part of his thought.

== Will to power and eternal recurrence ==
Throughout the 1880s, in his notebooks, Nietzsche developed a theory of the "eternal recurrence of the same" and much speculation on the physical possibility of this idea and the mechanics of its actualization occur in his later notebooks. Here, the will to power as a potential physics is integrated with the postulated eternal recurrence. Taken literally as a theory for how things are, Nietzsche appears to imagine a physical universe of perpetual struggle and force that repeatedly completes its cycle and returns to the beginning.

Some scholars believe that Nietzsche used the concept of eternal recurrence metaphorically. But others, such as Paul Loeb, have argued that "Nietzsche did indeed believe in the truth of cosmological eternal recurrence." By either interpretation the acceptance of eternal recurrence raises the question of whether it could justify a trans-valuation of one's life, and be a necessary precursor to the overman in his/her perfect acceptance of all that is, for the love of life itself and amor fati.

== Interpretations ==
In contemporary Nietzschean scholarship, some interpreters have emphasized the will to power as a psychological principle because Nietzsche applies it most frequently to human behavior. However, in Nietzsche's unpublished notes (later published by his sister as "The Will to Power"), Nietzsche sometimes seemed to view the will to power as a more (metaphysical) general force underlying all reality, not just human behavior—thus making it more directly analogous to Schopenhauer's will to live. For example, Nietzsche claims the "world is the will to power—and nothing besides!". Nevertheless, in relation to the entire body of Nietzsche's published works, many scholars have insisted that Nietzsche's principle of the will to power is less metaphysical and more pragmatic than Schopenhauer's will to live: while Schopenhauer thought the will to live was what was most real in the universe, Nietzsche can be understood as claiming only that the will to power is a particularly useful principle for his purposes.

Some interpreters also upheld a biological interpretation of the Wille zur Macht, making it equivalent with some kind of social Darwinism. For example, the concept was appropriated by some Nazis such as Alfred Bäumler, who may have drawn influence from it or used it to justify their expansive quest for power.

This reading was criticized by Martin Heidegger in his 1930s courses on Nietzsche—suggesting that raw physical or political power was not what Nietzsche had in mind. This is reflected in the following passage from Nietzsche's notebooks:

I have found strength where one does not look for it: in simple, mild, and pleasant people, without the least desire to rule—and, conversely, the desire to rule has often appeared to me a sign of inward weakness: they fear their own slave soul and shroud it in a royal cloak (in the end, they still become the slaves of their followers, their fame, etc.) The powerful natures dominate, it is a necessity, they need not lift one finger. Even if, during their lifetime, they bury themselves in a garden house!

Opposed to a biological and voluntary conception of the Wille zur Macht, Heidegger also argued that the will to power must be considered in relation to the Übermensch and the thought of eternal recurrence—although this reading itself has been criticized by Mazzino Montinari as a "macroscopic Nietzsche". Gilles Deleuze also emphasized the connection between the will to power and eternal return. Both Jacques Derrida and Gilles Deleuze were careful to point out that the primary nature of will to power is unconscious. This means that the drive to power is always already at work unconsciously, perpetually advancing the will of the one over the other. This thus creates the state of things in the observable or conscious world still operating through the same tension. Derrida is careful not to confine the will to power to human behavior, the mind, metaphysics, nor physical reality individually. It is the underlying life principle inaugurating all aspects of life and behavior, a self-preserving force. A sense of entropy and the eternal return, which are related, is always indissociable from the will to power. The eternal return of all memory initiated by the will to power is an entropic force again inherent to all life.

Opposed to this interpretation, the "will to power" can be understood (or misunderstood) to mean a struggle against one's surroundings that culminates in personal growth, self-overcoming, and self-perfection, and assert that the power held over others as a result of this is coincidental. Thus Nietzsche wrote:

My idea is that every specific body strives to become master over all space and to extend its force (its will to power) and to thrust back all that resists its extension. But it continually encounters similar efforts on the part of other bodies and ends by coming to an arrangement ("union") with those of them that are sufficiently related to it: thus they then conspire together for power. And the process goes on.

It would be possible to claim that rather than an attempt to 'dominate over others', the "will to power" is better understood as the tenuous equilibrium in a system of forces' relations to each other. While a rock, for instance, does not have a conscious (or unconscious) "will", it nevertheless acts as a site of resistance within the "will to power" dynamic. Moreover, rather than 'dominating over others', "will to power" is more accurately positioned in relation to the subject (a mere synecdoche, both fictitious and necessary, for there is "no doer behind the deed," (see On the Genealogy of Morals) and is an idea behind the statement that words are "seductions" within the process of self-mastery and self-overcoming. The "will to power" is thus a "cosmic" inner force acting in and through both animate and inanimate objects. Not just instincts but also higher level behaviors (even in humans) were to be reduced to the will to power. In Beyond Good and Evil, he claims that philosophers' "will to truth" (i.e., their apparent desire to dispassionately seek objective, absolute truth) is actually nothing more than a manifestation of their will to power; this will can be life-affirming or a manifestation of nihilism, but it is the will to power all the same.

Other Nietzschean interpreters dispute the suggestion that Nietzsche's concept of the will to power is merely and only a matter of narrow, harmless, humanistic self-perfection. They suggest that, for Nietzsche, power means self-perfection as well as outward, political, elitist, aristocratic domination. Nietzsche, in fact, explicitly and specifically defined the egalitarian state-idea as the embodiment of the will to power in decline:

To speak of just or unjust in itself is quite senseless; in itself, of course, no injury, assault, exploitation, destruction can be 'unjust,' since life operates essentially, that is in its basic functions, through injury, assault, exploitation, destruction and simply cannot be thought of at all without this character. One must indeed grant something even more unpalatable: that, from the highest biological standpoint, legal conditions can never be other than exceptional conditions, since they constitute a partial restriction of the will of life, which is bent upon power, and are subordinate to its total goal as a single means: namely, as a means of creating greater units of power. A legal order thought of as sovereign and universal, not as a means in the struggle between power complexes but as a means of preventing all struggle in general perhaps after the communistic cliché of Dühring, that every will must consider every other will its equal—would be a principle hostile to life, an agent of the dissolution and destruction of man, an attempt to assassinate the future of man, a sign of weariness, a secret path to nothingness.

Nietzsche thought that the drive is to manifest power rather than self-preservation. He thought it was most of the time incorrect that organisms live to prolong their life-time or extend the life of their species. Resistances are not painful annoyances but necessary for growth to occur. Suffering annoyances and being thwarted in ones attempt to accomplish a goal are necessary pre-conditions for our power. In 'Thus Spoke Zarathustra' Nietzsche said "And life confided the secret to me: behold, it said, I am that which must always overcome itself." Nietzsche thought it necessary to have the power to discharge ones strength and thus fulfil one's purpose in the manifestation of will to power.

"Physiologists should think twice before positioning the drive for self preservation as the cardinal drive of an organic being. Above all, a living thing wants to discharge its strength - life itself is will to power- self preservation is only one of the indirect and most infrequent consequences of this."

"Human beings do not seek pleasure and avoid displeasure. What human beings want, whatever the smallest organism wants, is an increase of power; driven by that will they seek resistance, they need something that opposes it - displeasure, as an obstacle to their will to power, is therefore a normal fact; human beings do not avoid it, they are rather in continual need of it".

=== Individual psychology ===
Alfred Adler borrowed heavily from Nietzsche's work to develop his second Viennese school of psychotherapy called individual psychology. Adler (1912) wrote in his important book Über den nervösen Charakter (The Neurotic Constitution):

Nietzsche's "Will to power" and "Will to seem" embrace many of our views, which again resemble in some respects the views of Féré and the older writers, according to whom the sensation of pleasure originates in a feeling of power, that of pain in a feeling of feebleness (Ohnmacht).

Adler's adaptation of the will to power was and still is in contrast to Sigmund Freud's pleasure principle or the "will to pleasure", and to Viktor Frankl's logotherapy or the "will to meaning". Adler's intent was to build a movement that would rival, even supplant, others in psychology by arguing for the holistic integrity of psychological well-being with that of social equality. His interpretation of Nietzsche's will to power was concerned with the individual patient's overcoming of the superiority-inferiority dynamic.

In Man's Search for Meaning, Frankl compared his third Viennese school of psychotherapy with Adler's psychoanalytic interpretation of the will to power:

... the striving to find a meaning in one's life is the primary motivational force in man. That is why I speak of a will to meaning in contrast to the pleasure principle (or, as we could also term it, the will to pleasure) on which Freudian psychoanalysis is centered, as well as in contrast to the will to power stressed by Adlerian psychology.

== See also ==
- Aggression
- Heinz Ansbacher
- Maximum power principle
- True Will
- The Will to Power (manuscript)
