= The Gay Science =

1882 book by Friedrich Nietzsche

The Joyous Science
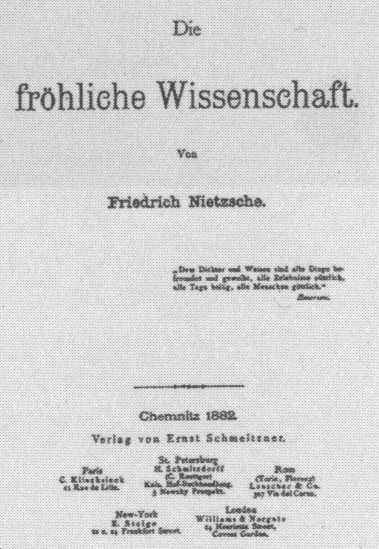
- Author: Friedrich Nietzsche
- Original title: Die fröhliche Wissenschaft
- Language: German
- Published: 1st edition: 1882 (Ernst Schmeitzner), 2nd edition: 1887 (E.W. Fritzsch)
- Publication date: 1882-1887
- Publication place: Germany
- Preceded by: Idylls from Messina (1881)
- Followed by: Thus Spoke Zarathustra (1883–1885)

The Gay Science (German: Die fröhliche Wissenschaft; sometimes translated as The Joyful Wisdom or The Joyous Science) is a book by Friedrich Nietzsche published in 1882, and was followed by a second edition in 1887, after the completion of Thus Spoke Zarathustra and Beyond Good and Evil. This substantial expansion includes the addition of a fifth book to the existing four books of The Gay Science, as well as an appendix of songs. It was described by Nietzsche as "the most personal of all my books", and contains more poems than any of his other works.

== Title ==
The book's title, in the original German and in translation, uses a phrase that was well known at the time in many European cultures and had specific meaning.

One of its earliest literary uses is in Rabelais's Gargantua and Pantagruel ("gai sçavoir"). It was derived from a Provençal expression (gai saber) for the technical skill required for poetry-writing. Johann Gottfried Herder elaborated on this in letters 85, 90, and 102 (1796) of his Letters for the Advancement of Humanity. The expression proved durable and was used as late as 19th-century American English by Ralph Waldo Emerson and E. S. Dallas. It was also used in deliberately inverted form, by Thomas Carlyle in "the dismal science", to criticize the emerging discipline of economics by comparison with poetry.

The book's title was first translated into English as The Joyful Wisdom, but The Gay Science has become the common translation since Walter Kaufmann's version in the 1960s. Kaufmann cites The Shorter Oxford English Dictionary (1955) that lists "The gay science (Provençal gai saber): the art of poetry."

In Ecce Homo, Nietzsche refers to the poems in the Appendix of The Gay Science, saying they were

... written for the most part in Sicily, are quite emphatically reminiscent of the Provençal concept of gaia scienza—that unity of singer, knight, and free spirit which distinguishes the wonderful early culture of the Provençals from all equivocal cultures. The very last poem above all, "To the Mistral", an exuberant dancing song in which, if I may say so, one dances right over morality, is a perfect Provençalism.

This alludes to the birth of modern European poetry that occurred in Provence around the 11th century, whereupon, after the culture of the troubadours fell into almost complete desolation and destruction due to the Albigensian Crusade (1209–1229), other poets in the 14th century ameliorated and thus cultivated the gai saber or gaia scienza. In a similar vein, in Beyond Good and Evil Nietzsche observed that,

... love as passion—which is our European speciality—[was invented by] the Provençal knight-poets, those magnificent and inventive human beings of the "gai saber" to whom Europe owes so many things and almost owes itself.

The original English translation as Joyful Wisdom is more comprehensible to the modern reader given the contrasting modern English meanings of "gay" and "science". The German fröhlich can be translated as "happy" or "joyful", cognate to the original meanings of "gay" in English and other languages. However, Wissenschaft is not "wisdom" (wisdom = Weisheit), but a propensity toward any rigorous practice of a poised, controlled, and disciplined quest for knowledge. The common English translation "science" is misleading if it suggests natural sciences—clearly inappropriate in this case, where "scholarship" is preferable, implying humanities.

== Content ==
The book is usually placed within Nietzsche's middle period, during which his work extolled the merits of science, skepticism, and intellectual discipline as routes to mental freedom. In The Gay Science, Nietzsche experiments with the notion of power but does not advance any systematic theory.

=== Amor fati ===
The affirmation of the Provençal tradition (invoked through the book's title) is also one of a joyful "yea-saying" to life. Nietzsche's love of fate naturally leads him to confront the reality of suffering in a radical way. For to love that which is necessary demands not only that we love the bad along with the good, but that we view the two as inextricably linked. In section 3 of the preface, he writes:

Only great pain is the ultimate liberator of the spirit... I doubt that such pain makes us 'better'; but I know that it makes us more profound.

This is representative of amor fati, the general outlook on life that he articulates in section 276:

I want to learn more and more to see as beautiful what is necessary in things; then I shall be one of those who makes things beautiful. Amor fati: let that be my love henceforth! I do not want to wage war against what is ugly. I do not want to accuse; I do not even want to accuse those who accuse. Looking away shall be my only negation. And all in all and on the whole: some day I wish to be only a Yes-sayer.

=== Eternal recurrence ===
The book contains Nietzsche's first consideration of the idea of the eternal recurrence, a concept which would become critical in his next work Thus Spoke Zarathustra and underpins much of the later works.

What if some day or night a demon were to steal after you into your loneliest loneliness and say to you: 'This life as you now live it and have lived it, you will have to live once more and innumerable times more' ... Would you not throw yourself down and gnash your teeth and curse the demon who spoke thus? Or have you once experienced a tremendous moment when you would have answered him: 'You are a god and never have I heard anything more divine.'

=== "God is dead" ===
The book mentions an occurrence of the famous formulation "God is dead"; this can be found in later works such as Thus Spoke Zarathustra.

After Buddha was dead, people
showed his shadow for centuries afterwards in a
cave,—an immense frightful shadow. God is dead:
but as the human race is constituted, there will
perhaps be caves for millenniums yet, in which
people will show his shadow.—And we—we have
still to overcome his shadow!

Section 125 depicts The Parable of the Madman who is searching for God. He accuses us all of being the murderers of God. "'Where is God?' he cried; 'I will tell you. We have killed him—you and I. All of us are his murderers..."
