= Thomas Common =

Scottish translator and critic (1850–1919)

Thomas Common (1850–1919) was a translator and critic, who translated several books by Friedrich Nietzsche into English. There is little information about him biographically, though indications are that he was a well-educated and literate scholar. He lived in the area of Corstorphine, Scotland which is now a suburb of Edinburgh.

In the mid-1890s, he joined a project led by Alexander Tille to produce a complete English edition of Nietzsche's work. Common translated several of them, including a version of Thus Spoke Zarathustra published in 1909.

In 1901 he published a book called Nietzsche as Critic, Philosopher, Poet and Prophet that was extremely enthusiastic about its subject, and was recommended to the publisher by George Bernard Shaw. The book did not circulate widely as the publisher, Grant Richards, went bankrupt soon after publication, but it was read by W. B. Yeats, who was strongly influenced by Nietzschean ideas, as can be seen in his poetry. From 1903 to 1916 Common produced a quarterly journal called Notes for Good Europeans (later titled The Good European Point of View), with the purpose of increasing public interest in Nietzsche.
