= Will to life =

Philosophical concept

The will to live (German: der Wille zum Leben) is a concept developed by the German philosopher Arthur Schopenhauer, representing an irrational "blind incessant impulse without knowledge" that drives instinctive behaviors, causing an endless insatiable striving in human existence.

This is contrasted with the concept of the will to survive under life threatening conditions used in psychology since Schopenhauer's notion of the will to live is more broadly understood as the "animal[istic] force to endure, reproduce and flourish".

There are significant correlations between the will to live and existential, psychological, social, and physical sources of distress. Many, who overcome near-death experiences with no explanation, have described the will to live as a direct component of their survival. The difference between the wish to die versus the wish to live is also a unique risk factor for suicide.

== Concept ==
In psychology, the will to live is the drive for self-preservation, usually coupled with expectations for future improvement in one's state in life. The will to live is an important concept when attempting to understand and comprehend why we do what we do in order to stay alive, and for as long as we can. This can be related to either one's push for survival on the brink of death, or someone who is just trying to find a meaning to continuing their life. Some researchers say that people who have a reason or purpose in life during such dreadful and horrific experiences will often appear to fare better than those that may find such experiences overwhelming. Every day, people undergo countless types of negative experiences, some of which may be demoralizing, hurtful, or tragic. An ongoing question continues to be what keeps the will to live in these situations. People who claim to have had experiences involving the will to live have different explanations behind it.

== Background ==
The will to live is considered to be a very basic drive in humans; but not necessarily the main driving force. In psychotherapy, Sigmund Freud termed the pleasure principle, which is the seeking of pleasure and avoiding of pain. Viktor Frankl, who spent time in German concentration camps, developed psychotherapy called logotherapy, which may be translated as the therapy focused on the "will to meaning". Maslow's hierarchy of needs highlights the innate appetite that people possess for love and belonging but before all this there is the very basic and powerful will to live. Psychologists have established that human beings are a goal-oriented species. In assessing the will to live, it should be borne in mind that it could be augmented or diminished by the relative strength of other simultaneously existent drives. Psychologists generally agree that there is the will to live, the will to pleasure, the will to superiority and the will to connection. There are also usually varying degrees of curiosity with regard to what may be termed the will to identity or establishing meaningful personal responses. The will to live is a platform without which it would not be possible to satisfy the other drives. However, this overlooks the possibility that there is a commonality among all creatures that drives all other urges.

== Similarity to self-preservation ==
Self-preservation is a behavior that ensures the survival of an organism. Pain and fear are integral parts of this mechanism. Pain motivates the individual to withdraw from damaging situations, to protect a damaged body part while it heals, and to avoid similar experiences in the future. Most pain resolves promptly once the painful stimulus is removed and the body has healed, but sometimes pain persists despite removal of the stimulus and apparent healing of the body; and sometimes pain arises in the absence of any detectable stimulus, damage or disease. Fear causes the organism to seek safety and may cause a release of adrenaline, which has the effect of increased strength and heightened senses such as hearing, smell, and sight. Self-preservation may also be interpreted figuratively, in regard to the coping mechanisms one needs to prevent emotional trauma from distorting the mind (see: defence mechanism.)

Even the most simple of living organisms (for example, the single-celled bacteria) are typically under intense selective pressure to evolve a response that would help avoid a damaging environment, if such an environment exists. Organisms also evolve while adapting - even thriving - in a benign environment (for example, a marine sponge modifies its structure in response to current changes, in order to better absorb and process nutrients). Self-preservation is therefore an almost universal hallmark of life. However, when introduced to a novel threat, many species will have a self-preservation response either too specialised, or not specialised enough, to cope with that particular threat. An example is the dodo, which evolved in the absence of natural predators and hence lacked an appropriate, general self-preservation response to heavy predation by humans and rats, showing no fear of them.

== Correlations ==
A "univariate analysis confirms that existential, psychiatric, social, and, to a lesser degree, physical variables are highly correlated with the will to live." Existential issues found to correlate significantly include hopelessness, the desire for death, sense of dignity, and burden to others. Psychiatric issues found to be strongly associated are such as depression, anxiety, and lack of concentration. Physical issues that showed the strongest associations were appetite and appearance which did not show the same consistent degree of correlation. The four main predictor variables of the will to live changing over time are anxiety, shortness of breath, depression, and sense of well-being which correlate with the other variable predictors as well. Social variables and quality of life measures are shown to correlate significantly with the will to live such as support and satisfaction with support from family, friends, and health care providers. Findings on the will to live have suggested that psychological variables are replaced by physical mediators of variation as death draws nearer. The will to live has also proven to be highly unstable.

== Research ==
Several studies have been conducted testing the theory of the will to live. These studies varied in their focus, but broadly sought to understand the will to live as it differs by demographics, especially as it concerns the elderly and the terminally ill. A study conducted in 2005 asked elderly participants to rate their will to live and tracked this data across time. It found that those who reported a high or stable will to live generally lived longer than those who reported a weak will to live. Additionally, this study proposed that women were generally better able to cope with life-altering or life-threatening conditions and situations than men. However, it also suggested that the participants may not have been of stable health, and that further study was required before drawing any definite conclusions. An earlier study conducted in 2002 tested the idea in terminally ill cancer patients, with most participants being elderly. This study found that those with the weakest will to live typically died sooner than those with a moderate will to live. Those with a high will to live could either die sooner or live as long as those with a moderate will to live. The authors went on to specify that further research is required, testing this theory against other terminal illnesses and in different age categories.

Anecdotal evidence also suggests a correlation between the individual will to live and survival in traumatic situations that include maltreatment. The Second World War and the Holocaust provide concrete examples of this, where many individuals survived years of malnourishment and mistreatment in concentration camps, and cited their will to live as a key part of their survival. A study conducted in 2003 suggested that positive thought (i.e., having a positive outlook on ones' future and life in general) could lower ones' risk for health complications and diseases. This study posited that women who had a more positive outlook were more likely to carry a greater number of antibodies for certain flu strains, which suggested a stronger immune system more generally than those who had a negative outlook. Further anecdotal evidence can be found through quantitative analysis of death records, which consistently show many people dying shortly after major holidays, suggesting that people will themselves to live until the holiday (or in other cases, a birthday), and then passing shortly thereafter.

== See also ==
- Antipredator adaptation
- Collective intelligence
- Conatus
- Dear enemy recognition
- Death drive
- Élan vital
- Fight-or-flight response
- Learned helplessness
- Reverence for Life
- Self-defense
- Struggle for existence
- Will to power
