= Alexander Tille =

German philosopher (1866–1912)

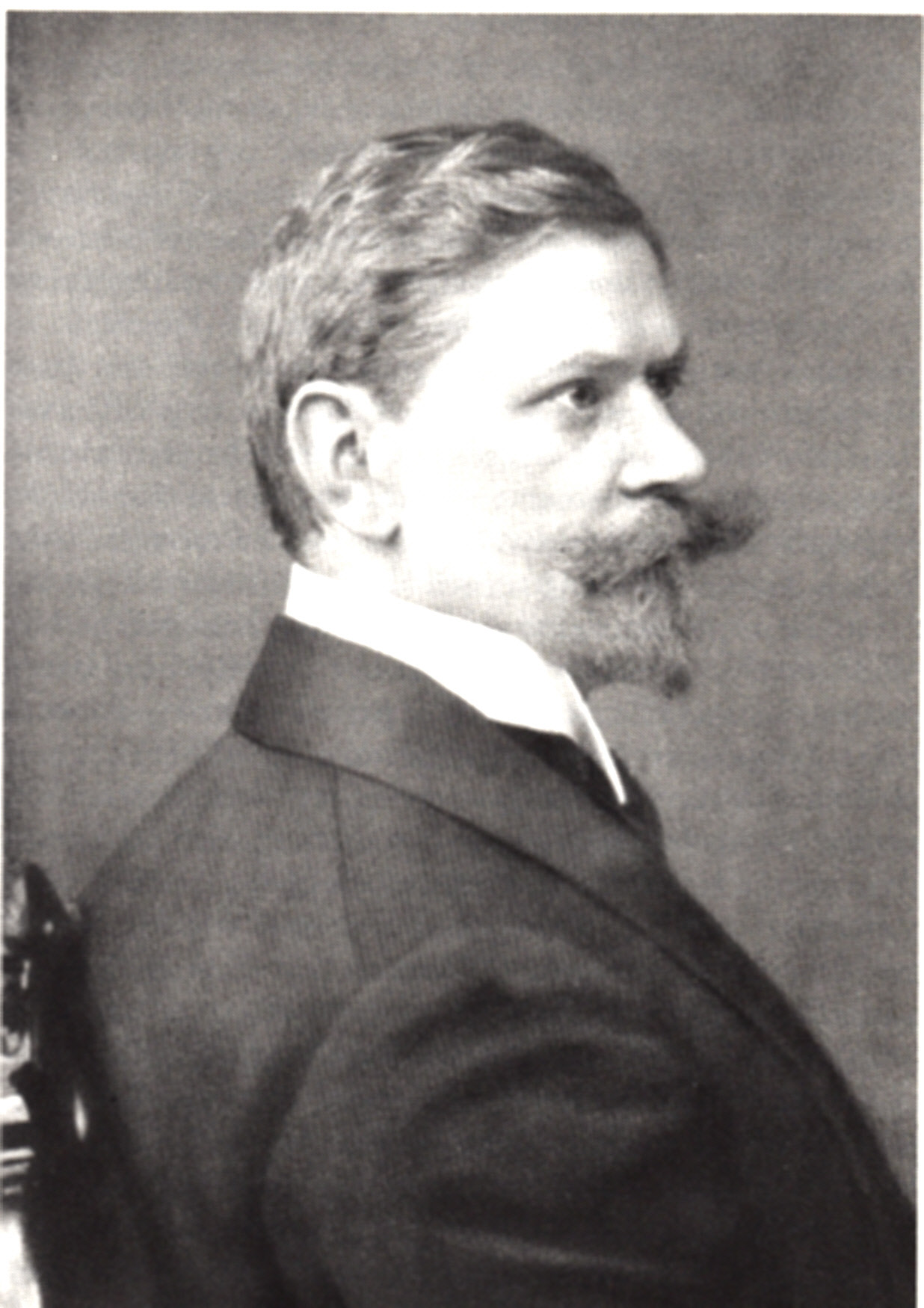
- Born: April 30, 1866
- Died: December 16, 1912 (aged 46); Saarbrücken, Germany

Alexander Tille (April 30, 1866 in Lauenstein – December 16, 1912 in Saarbrücken) was a German philosopher. He published the first English translation of Friedrich Nietzsche's Also sprach Zarathustra in 1896. Tille strongly supported eugenics and Social Darwinism. He claimed Christian ethics, democracy, equality, humanism and socialism were only the delusions held by the weak. Tille felt slums were good, since they could help purge society of the "unfit". He also thought disabled and mentally ill people should be left to starve, with food only given to the "fit".

== Bibliography ==
- Fritz Hellwig: "Alexander Tille." In: Peter Neumann (ed.): Saarländische Lebensbilder. Vol. 4. (1989), ISBN 3-925036-20-2.
- "Darwinismus und Zeitgeit." Zeitschrift für Religions-und Geistesgeschichte 14 (1962):143-80. cited by The descent of Darwin: the popularization of Darwinism in Germany, 1860-1914, Alfred Kelly, Chapel Hill, University of North Carolina Press 1981, ISBN 0-807-81460-1, p. 107.
