= Adrian Del Caro =

American historian

Adrian Del Caro is an American historian of German and Austrian literature, currently a Distinguished Humanities Professor at University of Tennessee. He has written several monographs on Friedrich Nietzsche and translated several books by Nietzsche into English. He received his Ph.D. from the University of Minnesota.
