= Philosophy of Friedrich Nietzsche =

Ideas of 19th-century German philosopher

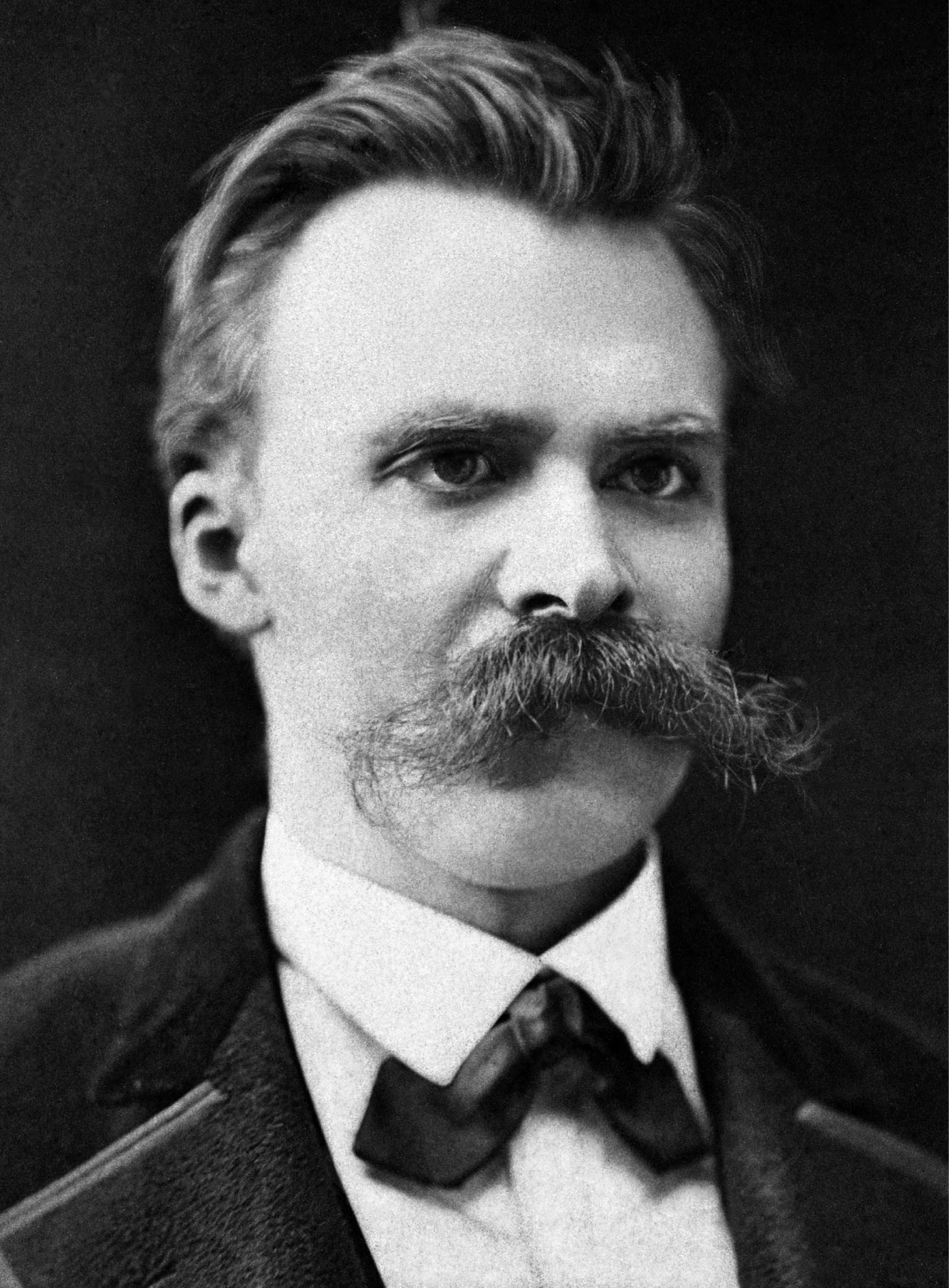
Nietzsche in c. 1875

Friedrich Nietzsche (1844–1900) developed his philosophy during the late 19th century. He owed the awakening of his philosophical interest to reading Arthur Schopenhauer's Die Welt als Wille und Vorstellung (The World as Will and Representation, 1819, revised 1844) and said that Schopenhauer was one of the few thinkers that he respected, dedicating to him his essay Schopenhauer als Erzieher (Schopenhauer as Educator), published in 1874 as one of his Untimely Meditations.

Since the dawn of the 20th century, the philosophy of Nietzsche has had great intellectual and political influence around the world. Nietzsche applied himself to such topics as morality, religion, epistemology, poetry, ontology, and social criticism. Because of Nietzsche's evocative style and his often outrageous claims, his philosophy generates passionate reactions running from love to disgust. Nietzsche noted in his autobiographical Ecce Homo that his philosophy developed and evolved over time, so interpreters have found it difficult to relate concepts central to one work to those central to another, for example, the thought of the eternal recurrence features heavily in Also sprach Zarathustra (Thus Spoke Zarathustra), but is almost entirely absent from his next book, Beyond Good and Evil. Added to this challenge is the fact that Nietzsche did not seem concerned to develop his thought into a system, even going so far as to disparage the attempt in Beyond Good and Evil.

Common themes in his thought can, however, be identified and discussed. His earliest work emphasized the opposition of Apollonian and Dionysian impulses in art, and the figure of Dionysus continued to play a role in his subsequent thought. Other major currents include the will to power, the claim that God is dead, the distinction between master and slave moralities, and radical perspectivism. Other concepts appear rarely, or are confined to one or two major works, yet are considered centerpieces of Nietzschean philosophy, such as the Übermensch and the thought of eternal recurrence. His later works involved a sustained attack on Christianity and Christian morality, and he seemed to be working toward what he called the transvaluation of all values (Umwertung aller Werte). While Nietzsche is often associated in the public mind with fatalism and nihilism, Nietzsche himself viewed his project as the attempt to overcome the pessimism of Arthur Schopenhauer.

== Views on truth, the self and knowledge ==
Nietzsche believed that there was no such thing as an objective truth, because every perception and conceptualization necessarily depended on the biases, prejudices and perspective of the observer. He put in doubt several assumptions commonly taken for granted. Against the existence of a single, unitary "I", he posited the self as a collection of several, often contradictory drives and desires, "a multiplicity of subjects whose interaction and struggle is the basis of our thought and our consciousness in general"; against the principle of cause and effect, he posited as perfectly likely that the universe is a succession of unrelated events and that a later event doesn't have to be caused by a previous event even if humans perceive it that way; against the existence of a subject independent of the action it carries out, and likewise of an object independent of the action it is subjected to, he posited that any one thing can only exist insofar as it either affects something else or is affected by something else. He also agreed with Schopenhauer's denial of free will: actions are determined by the inner struggle of conflicting desires: when one desire is strong enough, it leads to its actualization into an action; however, none is able to choose what they desire or the strength of a given desire (the strength of a desire being the only thing determining whether it will be acted out), for, otherwise, the desire would be a causa sui (to choose what to desire, or how much to desire is impossible, because "choosing" means simply "desiring something more than something else"; thus if desires were caused by choices, that would lead to the illogical conclusion that desires were caused by desires).

According to him, the fact existence is completely chaotic, irrational and unintelligible does not mean it is unreal, because reality does not have to conform to humanity's logical prejudices. He strongly criticized the belief that the present, real world is merely a prelude or an imitation of a "True World" or "better world", such as Plato's Realm of forms or the Heaven featured in many religions. He claimed that positing a fake world is a sign of décadence and a form of life-denial, a prelude to nihilism and pessimism, since it leads people to devalue their real life and see it as cruel and unfair by constantly comparing it to an idealized and nonexistent "perfect life".

== Nihilism, the Dionysian and the higher types ==
Nietzsche set out his philosophy in opposition to nihilism, which he defined as the feeling that life is purposeless, undesirable and not worth living. He blamed the development of nihilism on the fostering of décadence and traditional religions. The latter had cultivated over the centuries the idea that the only real objective of life was obeying God and reaching Heaven: therefore, as people stopped believing in either, they felt lost and developed a wholly pessimistic outlook.

Against nihilism, he championed the Dionysian spirit, which embraced chaos, change and adversity as the path to realization, enjoyment and self-overcoming, which he contrasted with the Apollonian spirit, which instead sought clarity and rationality. Nietzsche believed both spirits had their purpose, but that modern humanity had overemphasized the Apollonian and devalued the Dionysian. An excessive reliance on reason over sentiment had made them unable to enjoy life.

He also believed that humanity's greatest purpose was to allow for the development of exceptional, higher types (which he describes as being "sort of overmen, or Übermensch, in relation to humanity in general"), capable of immense power, creativity, bravery and ambition, capable of overcoming resistance, pain, suffering and even turning them to their advantage. This was tied to his view, as expressed in The Birth of Tragedy, that “only as an aesthetic phenomenon are existence and the world justified”. Higher men are thus necessary in order to make the world more beautiful, interesting and awe-inspiring.

The question is not what shall replace mankind in the order of living creatures —man is an end— but what type of man must be bred, must be willed, as being the most valuable, the most worthy of life, the most secure guarantee of the future. This more valuable type has appeared often enough in the past: but always as a happy accident, as an exception, never as deliberately willed. Very often it has been precisely the most feared; hitherto it has been almost the terrors of terrors.

— The Antichrist, §3

He criticized Christianity, democracy and egalitarianism because he perceived them as levelling-down ideologies which aimed to drag down powerful men or hinder their affirmation, ultimately aiming to make all of humanity weak, inoffensive and mediocre: the prime cause of Nihilism was the lack of strong men, capable of eliciting reverence, keeping alive the "faith in man" and setting down grand goals.

The destiny of Europe lies even in this— that in losing the fear of man, we have also lost the hope in man, yea, the will to be man. The sight of man now fatigues— what is present-day Nihlism if not that?— We are tired of man.

— Good and Bad, Good and Evil, §12

Overall, he viewed lower, common people as a means to an end (the end being the higher man), dismissing the idea that they could or should dictate to a higher man what he can and can’t do. He did not advocate a lifestyle free of moral bounds for everyone, but only for the exceptional.

My philosophy aims at an ordering of rank: not at an individualistic morality. The ideas of the herd should rule in the herd— but not reach out beyond it: the leaders of the herd require a fundamentally different variations, as do the independent, or the “beasts of prey”, etc.

— The Will to Power, §287

According to H.L. Mencken, “Nietzsche had no interest whatever in the delusion of the plain people – that is, intrinsically. It seemed to him of small moment what they believed, so long as it was safely imbecile. What he stood against was not their beliefs, but the elevation of those beliefs, by any sort of democratic process, to the dignity of a State philosophy – the pollution and crippling of the superior men by intellectual disease from below”.

In contrast to the "dwarfing of man" promoted by modern-day society, he championed the ancient aristocracies, which put the fittest in charge and encouraged them to pursue greatness by means of what he terms the "pathos of distance": the nobles looked down upon the people over which they ruled and greatly enjoyed their feeling of superiority over them, leading to a constant desire to increase their power and strength so as to differentiate themselves even more from the commoners.

Every elevation of the type "man," has hitherto been the work of an aristocratic society and so it will always be— a society believing in a long scale of gradations of rank and differences of worth among human beings, and requiring slavery in some form or other. Without the pathos of distance— such as grows out of the incarnated difference of classes, out of the constant out-looking and down-looking of the ruling caste on subordinates and instruments, and out of their equally constant practice of obeying and commanding, of keeping down and keeping at a distance— that other more mysterious pathos could never have arisen, the longing for an ever new widening of distance within the soul itself, the formation of ever higher, rarer, further, more extended, more comprehensive states, in short, just the elevation of the type "man".

— Beyond Good and Evil, §257

== Master morality and slave morality ==
It was the Jews who, in opposition to the aristocratic equation (good=aristocratic=beautiful=happy=loved by the gods), dared with a terrifying logic to suggest the contrary equation, and indeed to maintain with the teeth of the most profound hatred (the hatred of impotence) this contrary equation, namely: “the wretched are alone the good; the poor, the weak, the lowly, are alone the good; the suffering, the needy, the sick, the loathsome are the only ones who are pious, the only ones who are blessed, for them alone is salvation— whereas you, on the other hand, you aristocrats, you men of power, you are for all time the evil, the horrible, the covetous, the insatiate, the godless”.

— Good and Bad, Good and Evil, §7

Aristocratic and dominant societies, such as Ancient Greece and Ancient Rome, had what Nietzsche referred to as master morality: they saw “good” as synonymous of “strong”, “powerful”, “healthy” and “beautiful”, all qualities typical of the noble ruling classes. Weak people were deemed “bad” only in the sense that they were inferior and in an undesirable state, without however any moral condemnation. The nobles granted an outlet and instinct to all their passions, including violence, which found its expression through wars of conquest, since the ruling class was also the warrior class. The aristocrats did believe they had certain obligations towards each other, but this did not constitute a universal morality, as they were allowed to treat those below or outside as they pleased. And even when one of the nobles broke their internal code of conduct, he was not deemed to be “evil” but simply mad (for instance, the Greeks often claimed that this sort of behavior was caused by gods breathing folly into men), and therefore, while punished as a means of mere self-preservation, was not assigned any moral blame.

There eventually arose what Nietzsche terms slave morality, which recast the powerful (those who were deemed “good” according to master morality) and all their characteristics as being “evil”, and conversely inoffensiveness as being “good”. In contrast to master morality, slave morality sees “evil” actions as something willingly chosen by people, relying on the concept of free will (which Nietzsche rejects) so as to assign its enemies moral blame, ultimately culminating in a retributive version of the afterlife, where the “good people” (the slaves) will be rewarded, while the “evil people” (the masters) will be punished.

According to Nietzsche, the slaves’ revolt in morals had begun with the Jews, a “people born from slavery”. Their long tribulations had led to a deep hatred towards the aristocratic societies by which they had been subjugated (such as Egypt, Assyria, Babylon and Rome). This became particularly pronounced after they had lost their own warrior class following their defeat by the Babylonian Empire, with the priests becoming the sole ruling class: since they learned to see the warrior-aristocrat as nothing but an enemy and an enslaver, they supposedly “brought into their religion hatred toward the noble, toward the exalted and proud, toward power, toward the ruling orders”. In Nietzsche's view, this conception of morality had later been inherited by Christianity, which expanded it to even greater proportions. Nietzsche's highly negative views of ancient Jews contrasted with his far more positive one of modern Jews.

Nietzsche believed slave morality to be founded upon the bitter, rancorous and envious resentment (ressentiment) the weak held against the strong, which he found harmful both for humanity overall (since it stumped the development of higher types) but especially for the resentful people themselves, who ended up living in a constant state of misery as a result of it.

Nothing on earth consumes a man more quickly than the passion of resentment: mortification, morbid susceptibility, the inability to get revenge coupled with the desire and thirst for revenge, the concoction of every kind of poison— this is surely the most injurious manner of reacting which could possibly be conceived.

— Why I Am So Wise, §6

In Ecce Homo, he suggested the only “great cure” for resentment is what he calls Russian fatalism: "that fatalism which is free from rivolt and with whom the Russian soldier, to whom the campaign proves unbearable, ultimately lies down in the snow: to accept nothing more, to take nothing more, to absorb nothing more — to cease entirely from reacting".

He appreciated Buddhism and Epicureanism because they taught the weak to overcome resentment through calmness and small pleasure instead of taking out their anger on their superiors. He believed Jesus' true, original objective was to found something close to a "Buddhist peace movement", and that his teaching aimed at overcoming resentment so as to reach inner blessedness and peace of mind by means of radical non-resistance (accepting even his own death by crucifixion “without rebelling, without enmity, graciously, resignedly”), and included no reference to either sin or life beyond death. Nietzsche believed that Jesus’ message had been misrepresented by Paul of Tarsus and the Four Evangelists. He saw the Christian dogma which evolved after the death of Jesus as a form of revenge towards the powerful: according to Nietzsche, the Christian idea filled the latter with hatred and fear for themselves and their passions (through the concept of sin and divine punishment), and made them devalue their bodies (through the concept of soul) and life itself (through the concept of an afterlife and the consequent idea that one should pursue their wellbeing in the world beyond rather in the present one).

What is it we combat in Christianity? That it wants to break the strong, that it wants to discourage their courage, exploit their bad hours and their occasional weariness, convert their proud assurance into unease and distress of conscience, that it knows how to poison and sicken the noble instincts until their strength, their will to power backward, against itself— until the strong perish through orgies of self-contempt and self-abuse: that gruesome way of perishing of which Pascal provides the most famous example.

— The Will to Power, §252

== God is dead ==
Nietzsche conceptualizes his diagnostic with the statement "God is dead", which first appeared in his work in section 108 of The Gay Science, again in section 125 with the parable of "The Madman", and even more famously in Thus Spoke Zarathustra. It referred to the idea that humanity at large was beginning to lose faith in God and religion, largely as a result of scientific and rationalistic developments, and expressed his belief that religious values could no longer function as the basis of morality. The statement, typically placed in quotation marks, accentuated the crisis that Nietzsche argued that Western culture must face and transcend in the wake of the irreparable dissolution of its traditional foundations, moored largely in classical Greek philosophy and Christianity.

In aphorisms 55 and 56 of Beyond Good and Evil, Nietzsche talks about the ladder of religious cruelty that suggests how Nihilism emerged from the intellectual conscience of Christianity. Nihilism is sacrificing the meaning "God" brings into our lives; in aphorism 56, Nietzsche explains how to emerge from the utter meaninglessness of life by reaffirming it through his idea of Eternal Return.

In aphorisms 143 of The Gay Science he praises the greatest utility of the individualising self-creating values of polytheism, where he states:

The inventing of Gods, heroes, and supermen of all kinds, as well as co-ordinate men and undermen dwarfs, fairies, centaurs, satyrs, demons, devils was the inestimable preliminary to the justification of the selfishness and sovereignty of the individual: the freedom which was granted to one God in respect to other Gods, was at last given to the individual himself in respect to laws, customs and neighbours.

In 1034 of The Will to Power he then directly called himself to be a pagan, and claimed to be amongst the first to understand what its faith is:

We, many or few, who once more dare to live in a world purged of morality, we pagans in faith, we are probably also the first who understand what a pagan faith is: to be obliged to imagine higher creatures than man, but to imagine them beyond good and evil; to be compelled to value all higher existence as immoral existence. We believe in Olympus, and not in the "man on the cross."

== The will to power, the love of life and the thought of eternal recurrence ==
Since Martin Heidegger at least, the concepts of the will to power (Wille zur Macht), of Übermensch and of the thought of Eternal Recurrence have been inextricably linked. According to Heidegger's interpretation, one can not be thought without the others. During Nazi Germany, Alfred Baeumler attempted to separate the concepts, claiming that the Eternal Recurrence was only an "existential experience" that, if taken seriously, would endanger the possibility of a "will to power"— deliberately misinterpreted, by the Nazis, as a "will for domination". Baeumler attempted to interpret the "will to power" along Social Darwinist lines, an interpretation refuted by Heidegger in his 1930s courses on Nietzsche.

While Heidegger's reading has become predominant among commentators, some have criticized it: Mazzino Montinari by declaring that it was forging the figure of a "macroscopical Nietzsche", alien to all of his nuances.

=== The will to power ===
==== Overview ====
Nietzsche formulated his will to power as a counterpart to Schophenauer’s will to life. Nietzsche believed that every human action was ultimately an expression of will to power, that is, the desire to expand one's domain and ability to influence people and things; this was true even for those actions which appeared to be done out of love for others.

The disguised forms of the will to power:
1. Desire for freedom, independence, also for equilibrium, peace, co-ordination. Also the hermit, "spiritual freedom". In the lowest form: will to exist at all, "the drive to self-preservation".
2. Enrollment, so as to satisfy the will to power in a larger whole: submission, making oneself indespensable and useful to those in power; love, as a secret path to the heart of the most powerful, so as to dominate them.
3. The sense of duty, conscience, the imaginary consolation of outranking those who actually possess power; the recognition of an order of rank which permits judgement even of the most powerful; self-condemnation; the invention of new tables of value (Jews: classical example)

— The Will to Power, §774

Among the many manifestations of the will to power, it also expressed itself as a sadistic desire to harm others. However, with the advent of the State and communal life, which placed general prohibitions on violence, this drive, unable to find fulfillment outside, turned inwards, leading to the birth of guilt (which Nietzsche sees as sadism towards the self); some degree of guilt-feeling is as such an inevitable consequence of civilization itself.

… man’s external outlet became obstructed. These terrible bulwarks, with which the social organization protected itself against the old instincts of freedom (punishment belongs pre-eminently to these bulwarks) brought it about that all those instincts of wild, free, prowling man became turned backwards against man himself.

— “Guilt”, “Bad Conscience” and Related Matters, §16

The will to power however extends far beyond just the human realm, as a universal doctrine, being at the basis of the whole cosmos, down to a chemical level: he posits every force as having a drive to expand and subdue those outside it, up until it meets a greater or equal force capable of halting it, with reality itself being nothing more than a struggle for power, stating that "life simply is will to power".

==== Décadence ====
Nietzsche describes the weakening of the will to power using the term décadence, and believes this weakening to be the cause of pessimism (hatred of life, as opposed to the love of life typical of strong wills), laziness, ressentiment, lack of ambition, preference for reason over instinct and petty hedonism; the will to power still persists but expresses itself in an unhealthy way and, notably, is unable to appreciate struggle, and thus to appreciate life (which is itself nothing but a constant struggle). Nietzsche believes décadence to be mainly determined by physiological factors such as the cross-breeding of incompatible races or classes, an unsuitable climate or various undetected diseases.

==== Book project ====
"Will to power" (Wille zur Macht) is also the name of a projected book which he started but eventually decided not to complete; and the title of a book compiled from his notebooks and published posthumously and under suspicious circumstances by his sister and Peter Gast.

The work consists of four separate books, entitled "European Nihilism", "Critique of the Highest Values Hitherto", "Principles of a New Evaluation", and "Discipline and Breeding". Within these books there are some 1067 small sections, usually the shape of a circle, and sometimes just a key phrase—such as his opening comments in the 1st monstrosity of the preface: "Of what is great one must either be silent or speak with greatness. With greatness—that means cynically and with innocence."

Despite Elisabeth Förster-Nietzsche's falsifications (highlighted in 1937 by Georges Bataille and proved in the 1960s by the complete edition of Nietzsche's posthumous fragments by Mazzino Montinari and Giorgio Colli), his notes, even in the form given by his sister, remain a key insight into the philosophy of Nietzsche, and his unfinished transvaluation of all values. An English edition of Montinari & Colli's work is forthcoming (it has existed for decades in Italian, German and French).

The “Will to power” also contains the provisional outline to Nietzsche's aesthetics as a whole. This has been described as his attempt at a physiology of art where he established the concept of artistic rapture (Rausch). This phenomenon, which is considered a countermovement to nihilism, is for Nietzsche the force that brings forth not only the form but the fundamental condition for the enhancement of life.

=== Übermensch ===
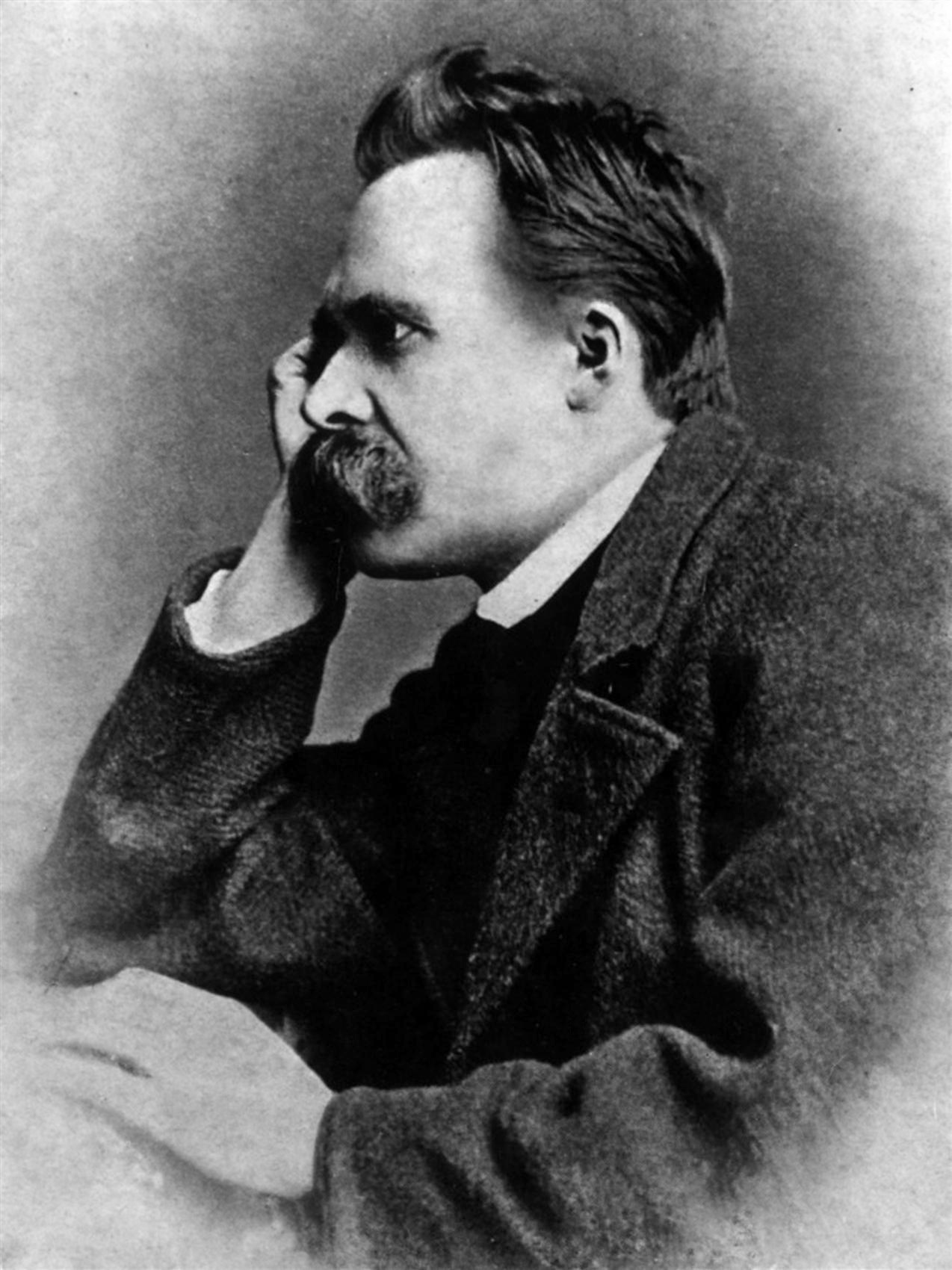
Friedrich Wilhelm Nietzsche

Throughout his works, Nietzsche writes about possible great human beings or "higher types" who serve as an example of people who would follow his philosophical ideas. These ideal human beings Nietzsche calls by terms such as "the philosopher of the future", "the free spirit", "the tragic artist" and "the Übermensch". They are often described by Nietzsche as being highly creative, courageous, powerful and extremely rare individuals. He compares such individuals with certain historical figures which have been very rare and often have not been considered geniuses, such as Napoleon, Goethe and Beethoven. His main example of a genius exemplary culture is Archaic Greece.

In Thus Spoke Zarathustra, Nietzsche posits the Übermensch (often translated as "overman" or "superman") as a goal that humanity can set for itself. While interpretations of Nietzsche's overman vary wildly, here are a few of his quotes from Thus Spoke Zarathustra:

I teach you the Übermensch. Man is something that shall be overcome. What have you done to overcome him?... All beings so far have created something beyond themselves; and do you want to be the ebb of this great flood, and even go back to the beasts rather than overcome man? What is the ape to man? A laughingstock or established embarrassment. And man shall be that to Übermensch: a laughingstock or painful embarrassment. You have made your way from worm to man, and much in you is still worm. Once you were apes, and even now, too, man is more ape than any ape... The Übermensch is the meaning of the earth. Let your will say: the Übermensch shall be the meaning of the earth... Man is a rope, tied between beast and Übermensch—a rope over an abyss... what is great in man is that he is a bridge and not an end...

=== Amor fati and the eternal recurrence ===
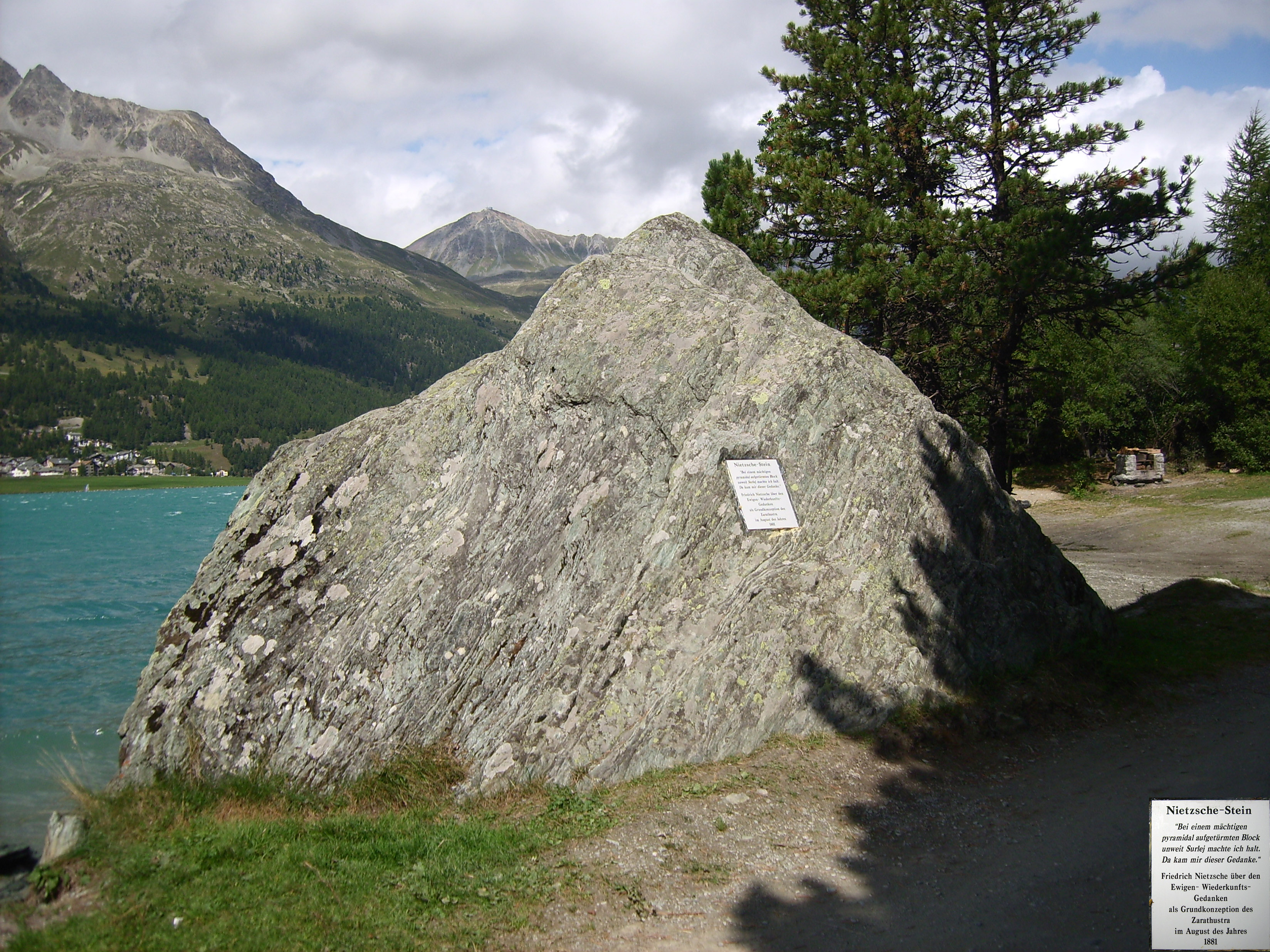
Rock on Lake Silvaplana where Nietzsche conceived of the idea of Eternal return.

Amor fati is the Nietzschean affirmation defining everything life offers as beautiful and necessary, embracing even struggle and suffering as a chance for self-overcoming. In Ecce Homo, Nietzsche described Amor fati as the "formula for greatness.” It is deeply tied to the concept of Eternal Recurrence, which states that everyone will come to repeatedly relive their own life in exactly the same way for eternity. The acceptance of the eternal recurrence would be the highest possible love of life and fate.

Nietzsche may have encountered the idea of the Eternal Recurrence in the works of Heinrich Heine, who speculated that, one day, a person would be born with the same thought-processes as himself, and that the same applied to every other individual. Although he admired Heine, he never mentions him in connection with this idea. Nietzsche put forth his theory in The Gay Science and further developed it in Thus Spoke Zarathustra. Schopenhauer directly influenced this theory.

Nietzsche's view on eternal return is similar to that of Hume: "the idea that an eternal recurrence of blind, meaningless variation—chaotic, pointless shuffling of matter and law—would inevitably spew up worlds whose evolution through time would yield the apparently meaningful stories of our lives. This idea of eternal recurrence became a cornerstone of his nihilism, and thus part of the foundation of what became existentialism." It is unclear whether Nietzsche viewed his idea as a scientific hypothesis or just a thought experiment whose purpose is to test individual's affirmation of life. He had an interest in natural sciences and read about related topics in cosmology and thermodynamics, but most of his scientific arguments remained unpublished. According to Lou Salome, who is considered an unreliable source, Nietzsche had plans to study natural sciences in Vienna or Paris in order to prove his idea. "Nietzsche viewed his argument for eternal recurrence as a proof of the absurdity or meaninglessness of life, a proof that no meaning was given to the universe from on high."

What if a demon were to creep after you one day or night, in your loneliest loneness, and say: "This life which you live and have lived, must be lived again by you, and innumerable times more. And mere will be nothing new in it, but every pain and every joy and every thought and every sigh—everything unspeakably small and great in your life—must come again to you, and in the same sequence and series... The eternal hourglass will again and again be turned—and you with it, dust of dust!" Would you not throw yourself down and curse the demon who spoke to you thus? Or have you once experienced a tremendous moment, in which you would answer him: "Thou art a god, and never have I heard anything more divine!" [The Gay Science (1882), p. 341 (passage translated in Danto 1965, p. 210).]

== Social and political views ==
Nietzsche's political ideas were once during his lifetime interpreted by Georg Brandes as aristocratic radicalism, a categorization which Nietzsche himself found best:

[Of Brandes' description of his philosophy, Nietzsche himself remarked:] "The expression 'aristocratic radicalism', which you employ, is very good. It is, permit me to say, the cleverest thing that I have yet read about myself"."

Otherwise, his ideas were also variously interpreted as Bonapartism, individualist anarchism, and more controversially as proto-fascism (see: Nietzsche and fascism) with some authors describing him as apolitical, anti-political or political sceptic. Today two positions have dominated the literature: one attributes to Nietzsche a commitment to aristocratic forms of social ordering, while the other denies that Nietzsche has any political philosophy at all. Walter Kaufmann put forward the view that the powerful individualism expressed in his writings would be disastrous if introduced to the public realm of politics. Georges Bataille argued in 1937, in the Acéphale review, that Nietzsche's thoughts were too free to be instrumentalized by any political movement. In "Nietzsche and Fascists," he argued against such instrumentalization, by the left or the right, declaring that Nietzsche's aim was to by-pass the short timespan of modern politics, and its inherent lies and simplifications, for a greater historical timespan.

Much of Nietzsche's contempt of politics is directed towards modern democratic, parliamentarian, party politics and especially mass movements such as socialism and antisemitic populism. He contrasted such mundane, petty politics with his idea of "great politics", and often praised individual politicians such as Napoleon. He interpreted Napoleon as an autocratic genius who stood above conventional morality, invalidated the French Revolution, restored colonial slavery, and tried to revive the aristocratic spirit of Roman Empire, paganism and Renaissance, and not as a progressive revolutionary leader like some of his contemporaries. Despite his proclaimed contempt for daily politics and culture of newspaper reading, which was a common attitude of conservatives who saw the mass publishing as subversive, Nietzsche did comment on contemporary political events in his letters and notes. He was deeply disturbed by the Paris Commune, he initially supported Bismarck but became disappointed by his later social policies and détente toward socialists and Catholics, he was worried about the rise of Adolf Stoecker, and after death of Emperor Friedrich III he became worried about the future of free speech in Germany.

He was against equality of rights and defended slavery, believing that it is a necessary condition for supporting an upper class which could devote itself to more sophisticated activities. In his letters and personal notes he ridiculed American abolitionists such as Harriet Beecher Stowe, and wrote disparagingly of German attempts, led by the Kaiser and Christian activists, to end slavery in colonial Africa (leading to Brussels Conference Act of 1890). Nietzsche claimed that the upper classes are overreacting and projecting their own sensitivity to the suffering of slaves and poor industrial workers who are supposedly toughened by hardship, less sensitive to pain and contended with their life. However, while he wrote positively about ancient and colonial slavery, he did not leave any clear comments suggesting that he actually advocated reintroduction of slavery in modern Europe. In fact, he proposed that the rebellious European workers could be pacified by shifting some of their burden to Asian and African populations. He saw the contemporary revolutionary and emancipatory movements as the most recent part of the long-term social and cultural decay as he noted:

Continuation of Christianity by the French Revolution. Rousseau is the seducer: he again removes the chains of woman, who from then on is represented in an ever more interesting way, as suffering. Then the slaves and Mistress Beecher-Stowe. Then the poor and the workers. Then the vicious and the sick — all that is brought to the fore.

Nietzsche extoled aristocratic societies and military elites claiming that they create higher quality of culture. He often linked noble classes with ancient barbarian conquerors. His thoughts were usually oriented to the future aristocracy, not so much to the preservation of existing monarchical order, which he saw as exhausted and a thing of the past. He saw the last expression of noble values, French seventeenth and eighteenth century, lost after the fall of Napoleon. Much of his thoughts on the subject are unsystematic and he did not leave specific instructions about how this new aristocratic class should be selected and elevated to the ruling positions in society. However, he was quite clear that he used the term "aristocracy" in the traditional sense, meaning noble birth and hereditary hierarchy; he ridiculed the idea of "aristocracy of the spirit" popular among intellectuals as a democratic subversion. In the context of his criticism of morality and Christianity, expressed, among others works, in On the Genealogy of Morals and in The Antichrist, Nietzsche often criticized humanitarian feelings, detesting how pity and altruism were ways for the "weak" to take power over the "strong". To the "ethics of compassion" (Mitleid, "shared suffering") exposed by Schopenhauer, Nietzsche opposed an "ethics of friendship" or of "shared joy" (Mitfreude).

=== Individualism and liberalism ===
Nietzsche often referred to the common people who participated in mass movements and shared a common mass psychology as "the rabble", or "the herd". Although he valued individualism his general political views included many hierarchical and authoritarian ideas which are usually incompatible with modern individualistic ideologies. He often used the term "individualism" to describe a certain set of personality traits - such as originality, nonconformism and egoism - not to describe the political system based on institutions that guarantee wide individual rights and freedoms. According to Nietzsche, who often held pre-Socratic Greece and ancient Rome as the social model, individualism and freedom should be reserved only for the aristocratic minority, while discouraged among the subjugated masses who don't have the natural capacity for it. Such freedom is not given to all people as a natural right but is earned by the strong individual through struggle, and is closely connected to the power that he can exercise over others. Arguably, such elitist individualism can be interpreted as similar to early liberalism since many authors and politicians at the time supported stratified society with low social mobility, racial exclusion, colonial conquests and even slavery. It is also comparable with conservative, aristocratic liberalism of Alexis de Tocqueville, Hippolyte Taine, Jacob Burckhardt (Nietzsche corresponded with the latter two) although his overall philosophy is much more radical.

In his opposition to Christian tradition and modern philosophy Nietzsche also criticized the concepts of soul, subject and atomism (that is, the existence of an atomic subject at the foundation of everything, found for example in social contract theories). He considered the individual subject as a complex of instincts and wills-to-power, just as any other organization. He claimed that idea of subject, whether in metaphysical or scientific sense, leads to the belief in essential equality of people and is politically used to justify notion of human rights, therefore calling René Descartes the "grandfather of French Revolution".

Beginning in the 1890s some scholars have attempted to link his philosophy with Max Stirner's radical individualism of The Ego and Its Own (1844). The question remained pendent. Recently there was unearthed further, still circumstantial, evidence clarifying his relationship with Stirner. In any case, few philosophers really consider Nietzsche an "individualist" thinker. Against the strictly "egoist" perspective adopted by Stirner, Nietzsche concerned himself with the "problem of the civilization" and the necessity to give humanity a goal and a direction to its history, making him, in this sense, a very political thinker. In The Will to Power he described individualism as a part of the process that leads to the ultimate goal of establishing the order of rank:

Individualism is a modest and still unconscious form of will to power; with it a single human unit seems to think it sufficient to free himself from the preponderating power of society (or of the State or Church). He does not set himself up in opposition as a personality, but merely as a unit; he represents the rights of all other individuals as against the whole. That is to say, he instinctively places himself on a level with every other unit: what he combats he does not combat as a person, but as a representative of units against a mass. (...) When one has reached a certain degree of independence, one always longs for more: separation in proportion to the degree of force; the individual is no longer content to regard himself as equal to everybody, he actually seeks for his peer—he makes himself stand out from others. Individualism is followed by a development in groups and organs; correlative tendencies join up together and become powerfully active: now there arise between these centres of power, friction, war, a reconnoitring of the forces on either side, reciprocity, understandings, and the regulation of mutual services. Finally, there appears an order of rank.

While Nietzsche shared some of the liberal ideas and values such as individualism, private property, economic inequality, suspicion of state power, and dismissed political criticisms of exploitation his philosophy does not have much in common with classical liberalism and capitalism. He wrote that liberalism is synonymous with mediocrity and believed also that it leads to cultural decay. He also decried "liberal optimism" of political economy, the idea that economic development and technological innovation should solve social problems; even though it was more attainable and moderate than socialist utopianism, he still saw the goal of mass happiness and comfort as unworthy and philistine. He dismissed captains of the industry as vulgar and even blamed them for the rise of socialism, claiming that rise of the capitalist class disrupted the order of rank and that workers would not rebel if they were able to serve the true, natural aristocrats instead of capitalists whom they do not see as superiors but just as ordinary people who got lucky with money. Bourgeoisie, with its love of practical work and educational, intellectual specialization, is unable to create aristocratic culture of leisure and sophistication. He praised Napoleon for reviving the warlike, aristocratic spirit which triumphed over the "modern ideas", over "the businessman and the philistine". His attitudes were particularly negative in his earlier works. He claimed that luxurious goods should be heavily taxed and that economy should be regulated so that people cannot get rich quickly by means of financial speculation. In Human, All Too Human, the work of his middle period, he wrote that "youthful Jew of the stock exchange is the most repugnant invention of the whole human race". However, he later significantly changed his attitude and noted that Jewish financiers should play a prominent role in the new united Europe. In his later writings he even particularly praised Jewish capitalists as powerful, natural allies against Christianity, socialism and nationalism. In December 1888, his last month of sanity he wrote in a notebook:

It will be a good idea to found societies everywhere so as to deliver into my hands at the right time a million disciples. It is particularly important to recruit first of all officers and Jewish bankers. Both together represent the will to power. If I ask who my natural allies are I see that above all they are officers. With military instincts in the body one cannot be a Christian... In the same way, Jewish bankers are my natural allies, as the only international power which, by origin and instinct, binds nations together after accursed interest-politics has made the arrogance and egoism of nations into a duty.

According to Domenico Losurdo, in his later works Nietzsche concluded that the industrial society which he disliked is here to stay and the return to warlike, landed aristocracy is unrealistic. He also developed some sympathies to the diligent, competent bourgeoisie, seeing the wealthy capitalist class as necessary allies in the struggle against both Adolf Stoecker's Christian movement and social democracy which were gaining influence in Germany. To solve the conflict he hesitantly accepted the idea that aristocracy should absorb the emerging capitalist class while retaining the cultural supremacy. Even the vulgar commercial activities could be transformed by the aristocracy in a similar way that hunting was raised from practical subsistence into a ceremonial, luxurious activity. Don Dombowsky argues that Nietzsche's criticisms of capitalism are mostly cultural and moderate; compared with the usual ideological points of political economy and views on class conflict, he is still consistently aligned with the capital against the worker movement which he saw as a fundamental threat to his hierarchical vision of society. William Altman also interprets Nietzsche's criticism of capitalist class as the advice to cultivate better public image and thus legitimize the social hierarchy.

=== Criticism of socialism and labour movement ===
Negative attitude towards socialism and proletarian movement was one of the most consistent themes in Nietzsche's philosophy. He wrote negatively of socialism as early as 1862 and his criticisms of socialism are often harsher than those of other doctrines. He was critical of French Revolution and was deeply disturbed by the Paris Commune which he saw as a destructive insurrection of the vulgar lower classes that made him feel "annihilated for several days". In his later writings he especially praised contemporary French authors, most of whom were right-wing thinkers whose works expressed strongly negative response to the Commune and its political heritage. As opposed to the urban working class, Nietzsche praised the peasantry as an example of health and natural nobility. Beyond only abstract, cultural opposition, he regularly wrote against specific social policies of the German Empire that aimed to improve the position and welfare of the workers. He was particularly against democratic, universal education, calling it "barbarism" and "a prelude to communism" because it pointlessly arouses the masses who are "born to serve and obey".

He called socialism "the tyranny of the meanest and the dumbest" and claimed that it attracts inferior people who are motivated by ressentiment. A lot of his criticism is linked to his view of Christianity; he called socialism "residue of Christianity and of Rousseau in the de-Christianised world". He described Rousseau as "moral tarantula", his ideas as "idiocies and half-truths" that were born out of self-contempt and inflamed vanity, claimed that he held a grudge against the ruling classes and by moralizing, he tried to blame them for his own misery. He named him together with Savonarola, Martin Luther, Robespierre and Henri de Saint-Simon as fanatics, "sick intellects" who influence masses and stand in opposition to strong spirits. He similarly called Eugen Dühring an "apostle of revenge", "moral braggart" and his ideas "indecent and revolting moralistic gibberish". He saw egalitarian and peaceful socialist community as essentially antagonistic to life; in On the Genealogy of Morality, he wrote:

A legal system conceived of as sovereign and universal, not as a means in the struggle of power complexes, but as a means against all struggles in general, something along the lines of Dühring's communist cliché in which each will must be considered as equal to every will, that would be a principle hostile to life, a destroyer and dissolver of human beings, an assassination attempt on the future of human beings, a sign of exhaustion, a secret path to nothingness.

Nietzsche believed that if socialist goals are achieved, society would be leveled down and conditions for superior individuals and higher culture would disappear. In Twilight of the Idols he wrote:

"Equality", a certain definite process of making everybody uniform, which only finds its expression in the theory of equal rights, is essentially bound up with a declining culture: the chasm between man and man, class and class, the multiplicity of types, the will to be one's self and to distinguish one's self – that, in fact, which I call the pathos of distance is proper to all strong ages.

Unlike many conservative and liberal authors of the era, Nietzsche didn't justify the dismal conditions of the working class purely as an unfortunate price that had to be paid for the leisured, cultured lifestyle of the upper-class minority, but saw them as an expression of natural caste order which is necessary for both the rulers and the ruled. He believed the majority of people could find happiness and sense of purpose in submission to the most powerful, and that, even though they might desire freedom, they would not actually enjoy it. He claimed that even if reduction of work and granting more leisure to the masses were economically feasible, they would have a negative social, cultural effect because people of common nature are incapable of fully appreciating aristocratic idleness. The highest society imagined by socialists would be the lowest according to his order of rank.

In The Antichrist, he wrote:

...one reflects on how necessary it is to the great majority that there be regulations to restrain them from the outside, and to what extent control, or, in a higher sense, slavery, is the one and only condition which makes for the well-being of the weak-willed man...

Whom do I hate most heartily among the rabbles of today? The rabble of Socialists, the apostles to the Chandala, who undermine the workingman's instincts, his pleasure, his feeling of contentment with his petty existence—who make him envious and teach him revenge... Wrong never lies in unequal rights; it lies in the assertion of "equal" rights... What is bad? But I have already answered: all that proceeds from weakness, from envy, from revenge. — The anarchist and the Christian have the same ancestry...

In The Will to Power, he further elaborated similarity between Christianity and socialism:

The Gospel is the announcement that the road to happiness lies open for the lowly and the poor—that all one has to do is to emancipate one's self from all institutions, traditions, and the tutelage of the higher classes. Thus Christianity is no more than the typical teaching of Socialists. Property, acquisitions, mother-country, status and rank, tribunals, the police, the State, the Church, Education, Art, militarism: all these are so many obstacles in the way of happiness, so many mistakes, snares, and devil's artifices, on which the Gospel passes sentence—all this is typical of socialistic doctrines. Behind all this there is the outburst, the explosion, of a concentrated loathing of the "masters,"—the instinct which discerns the happiness of freedom after such long oppression... (Mostly a symptom of the fact that the inferior classes have been treated too humanely, that their tongues already taste a joy which is forbidden them... It is not hunger that provokes revolutions, but the fact that the mob have contracted an appetite en mangeant...)

In Aphorism 763 of the same book, he claims workers should come to see their labor as a sacred duty (similarly to how soldiers see military service), as opposed to something done in exchange for money, and that each worker should be assigned tasks compatible with his own unique abilities:

Workers should learn to feel like soldiers. An honorarium, an income, but no pay! No relation between payment and achievement! But the individual, each according to his kind, should be so placed that he can achieve the highest that lies in his power.

While he was consistently opposed to granting the common, "lower" people any sort of political or decisional power, and overall saw them as mere tools of the aristocratic masters, he expresses confusing views on how they are to be treated: in some passages, as noted above, he seemingly advocated repression to avoid rebellions; elsewhere, however, he claims approvingly of aristocrats handling the commoners "in a far more delicate way than they approach themselves or their equals", and states that helping the unfortunate can be a characteristic of the noble man (provided that it is "an impulse caused by a superabundance on power" and not done out of pity or a sense of obligation).

Nietzsche never mentioned Karl Marx or Friedrich Engels by name, and it is unclear whether he was acquainted with their ideas. However, they are more or less extensively quoted and discussed in eleven books that Nietzsche owned in his personal library and in one of them he underlined Marx's name. In socialist countries, Nietzsche was usually considered a disreputable reactionary, bourgeois, imperialist or fascist philosopher. His books were unavailable to the public in the Soviet Union from 1923. They were placed on the list of forbidden books and were kept in libraries only for restricted, authorized use. Until 1988, they were not translated or reprinted, and in the years between 1938 and 1988, only ten dissertations on Nietzsche were defended. Western leftist writers, led by French postwar intellectuals, largely rehabilitated Nietzsche on the left and have proposed ways of using Nietzschean theory in what has become known as the "politics of difference" – particularly in formulating theories of political resistance and sexual and moral difference.

=== Race, class and eugenics ===
Nietzsche often made racist, classist remarks and used racialist explanations of cultural and political phenomena. Some of his later admirers often tried to reinterpret, downplay or ignore this part of his thought, but because of preponderance of explicit comments in Nietzsche's work, such approaches remain controversial. There are also controversies about some newer translations of Nietzsche which seem to be misleadingly euphemistic when dealing with more loaded terms that Nietzsche used. Nietzsche used the term race in two different meanings, for ethnic groups and social classes.

He believed that race and class are identical in the sense that nations are composed of different races and that upper classes are usually of superior nature to the lower. He was fascinated by the restrictive caste system of India and Laws of Manu which he saw as promoting eugenics. Such ideas about aristocracy and race were especially popularized in the 19th century by Arthur de Gobineau. It is unclear whether Nietzsche was directly influenced by Gobineau but he was probably aware of his work because of numerous similarities and because Richard Wagner was an admirer who wrote an introductory essay on his work. Excerpts from Gobineau were frequently published in the Wagnerian journal Bayreuther Blätter which Nietzsche read.

Despite his oppositions to Darwinism, he was very interested in the works of Francis Galton, although he had only partial knowledge of his works since they were not translated. Like Nietzsche, Galton also praised ancient Greeks claiming that their customs, partially unconsciously, promoted eugenic outcomes and population control. Nietzsche admired the Megaran poet Theognis who rallied against marriages between the aristocracy and common people. He proposed numerous eugenic policies such as medical examinations before marriage, discouragement of celibacy among successful and healthy individuals, tax breaks, and also castration of criminals and mentally ill. Along with his opposition to Darwinism, he also disagreed with Social Darwinism, especially Herbert Spencer's ideas of progress, but Nietzsche's views on welfare policies, social conflict and inequality are not much different from the ones usually held by Social Darwinists. He didn't share the evolutionary optimism of the Darwinists, believing that current trends in European society point to degeneration of the species rather than to survival of the fittest. Some of his views were influenced by the works of Charles Féré and Théodule-Armand Ribot.

One of the themes that Nietzsche often used to explain social phenomena was mixing of the races. He believed that mixed race persons were usually inferior because of the conflicting, incompatible instincts that exist in them, and advocated racial purification. He used Socrates as a negative example of miscegenation, although he claimed that it can also occasionally create energetic individuals such as Alcibiades and Caesar. He blamed the mixing of the races on the decay of the European society and culture, but also credited it with the creation of modern men of the "historical sense."

He also used the term race in the ethnic meaning and in this sense he supported the idea of mixing specific races which he considered to be of high quality (for example he proposed that Germans should mix with Slavs). Despite occasional reverence for ancient Germanic conquests and his identification of upper class with blond, dolichocephalic type, Nietzsche's ideas do not have much in common with Nordicism. He occasionally also praised non-European cultures, such as Moors, Incas and Aztecs, claiming that they were superior to their European conquerors. In The Dawn of Day he also proposed mass immigration of Chinese to Europe claiming that they would bring "modes of living and thinking, which would be found very suitable for industrious ants" and help "imbue this fretful and restless Europe with some of their Asiatic calmness and contemplation, and—what is perhaps most needful of all—their Asiatic stability." While Nietzsche's thoughts on the subject are often vague, he did occasionally use very harsh language, calling for "the annihilation of the decadent races" and "millions of deformed".

=== Jews, nationalism and European identity ===
"The whole problem of the Jews exists only in nation states, for here their energy and higher intelligence, their accumulated capital of spirit and will, gathered from generation to generation through a long schooling in suffering, must become so preponderant as to arouse mass envy and hatred. In almost all contemporary nations, therefore – in direct proportion to the degree to which they act up nationalistically – the literary obscenity of leading the Jews to slaughter as scapegoats of every conceivable public and internal misfortune is spreading."
— Friedrich Nietzsche, 1886, [Human, All Too Human 1 475]

"Let no more Jews come in and shut the doors, especially towards the East (also towards Austria)!"—thus commands the instinct of a people [the Germans] whose nature is still feeble and uncertain, so that it could be easily wiped out, easily extinguished, by a stronger race. The Jews, however, are beyond all doubt the strongest, toughest, and purest race at present living in Europe, they know how to succeed even under the worst conditions (in fact better than under favourable ones), by means of virtues of some sort, which one would like nowadays to label as vices.

— Beyond Good and Evil, § 251

Nietzsche made numerous comments on Jews and Judaism, both positive and negative, and his attitudes changed significantly during his life, from fairly common criticism of Jews to more complex and specific perspective. There are also controversies about translations of his work which sometimes try to tone down his more inflammatory remarks or disguise some of the attitudes he expresses.

He blamed Judaism for spreading the idea of monotheism which puts a perfect God so high above humans that they all seem small before him and essentially equal among themselves. But he also praised parts of the Old Testament and early Jewish history. He claimed that Judaism went through a negative, moralistic-pessimistic transformation during the Babylonian captivity. By losing their native aristocratic class, subjugated Jews, now composed only of the priestly caste and the Chandala, became resentful toward their foreign masters and generalized such feelings into a religious ressentiment towards any type of aristocracy, thus inventing the Master–slave morality. Christianity was a further, even more radical development of the same idea that went on to undermine the aristocratic Roman Empire, and was later followed by the Protestant Reformation and French Revolution. Although Nietzsche didn't put blame on cultural decay exclusively on Jews, like some biological antisemites, he did note their decisive historical influence. Nietzsche even claimed that antisemites are also the product of Jewish spirit, since with their Christian, populist and socialist ideas, they exhibit the same slave morality and ressentiment that were historically pioneered by the Jews. In that sense, his negative attitude towards the Jews goes even further than the usual antisemitism of his era. He also held many common stereotypes about Jews being shrewd, egotistical, exploitative, dishonest and manipulative, although he didn't necessarily consider all these characteristics negative.

He also often praised Jewish intelligence and achievements. He had a very negative attitude toward contemporary antisemitic movements, which were usually based on Christian, nationalist and economic animosity towards Jews. In Germany, the antisemitic movement at the time was closely connected to the Christian socialism of Adolf Stoecker. His biographers, Domenico Losurdo and Julian Young, describe Nietzsche as being primarily against such populist, economic antisemitism, seeing it as motivated purely by resentment of Jewish success and money. In a letter, he wrote that "anti-Semitism appears to be exactly like the struggle against the rich and the means previously employed to become rich". He praised old, wealthy Jewish families as a sort of refined Jewish aristocracy, seeing them as allies in the fight against socialism, while remaining scornful towards the masses of Jewish workers, artisans and merchants, who were often poor immigrants from Eastern Europe, perceived as uncouth and politically subversive. His most negative comments are directed against Jewish prophets and priests due to their historical influence on the West; he saw the leftist intellectuals as their modern version. Regarding the wealthy Jewish financiers, he even proposed an assimilationist policy of eugenic marriages with Prussian nobility.

Nietzsche broke with his publisher in 1886 in opposition to the latter's antisemitic stances; he was already dissatisfied because Schmeitzner's political engagement in Anti-Jewish Alliance was the reason for delayed publication of Zarathustra. His rupture with Richard Wagner, expressed in The Case of Wagner and Nietzsche contra Wagner, both of which he wrote in 1888, had much to do with Wagner's endorsement of pan-Germanism and antisemitism – and also of his rallying to Christianity. In a March 29, 1887 letter to Theodor Fritsch, Nietzsche mocked antisemites, Fritsch, Eugen Dühring, Wagner, Ebrard, Adolf Wahrmund, and the leading advocate of pan-Germanism, Paul de Lagarde, who would become, along with Wagner and Houston Chamberlain, the main official influences of Nazism. This 1887 letter to Fritsch ended by: "And finally, how do you think I feel when the name Zarathustra is mouthed by anti-Semites?" He admitted that his Thus Spoke Zarathustra was read and positively reviewed almost only by Wagnerians and antisemites who also unsuccessfully tried to win him to their cause. However, his philosophy actually started to attract a significant number of Jewish admirers and he established correspondence with some of them.

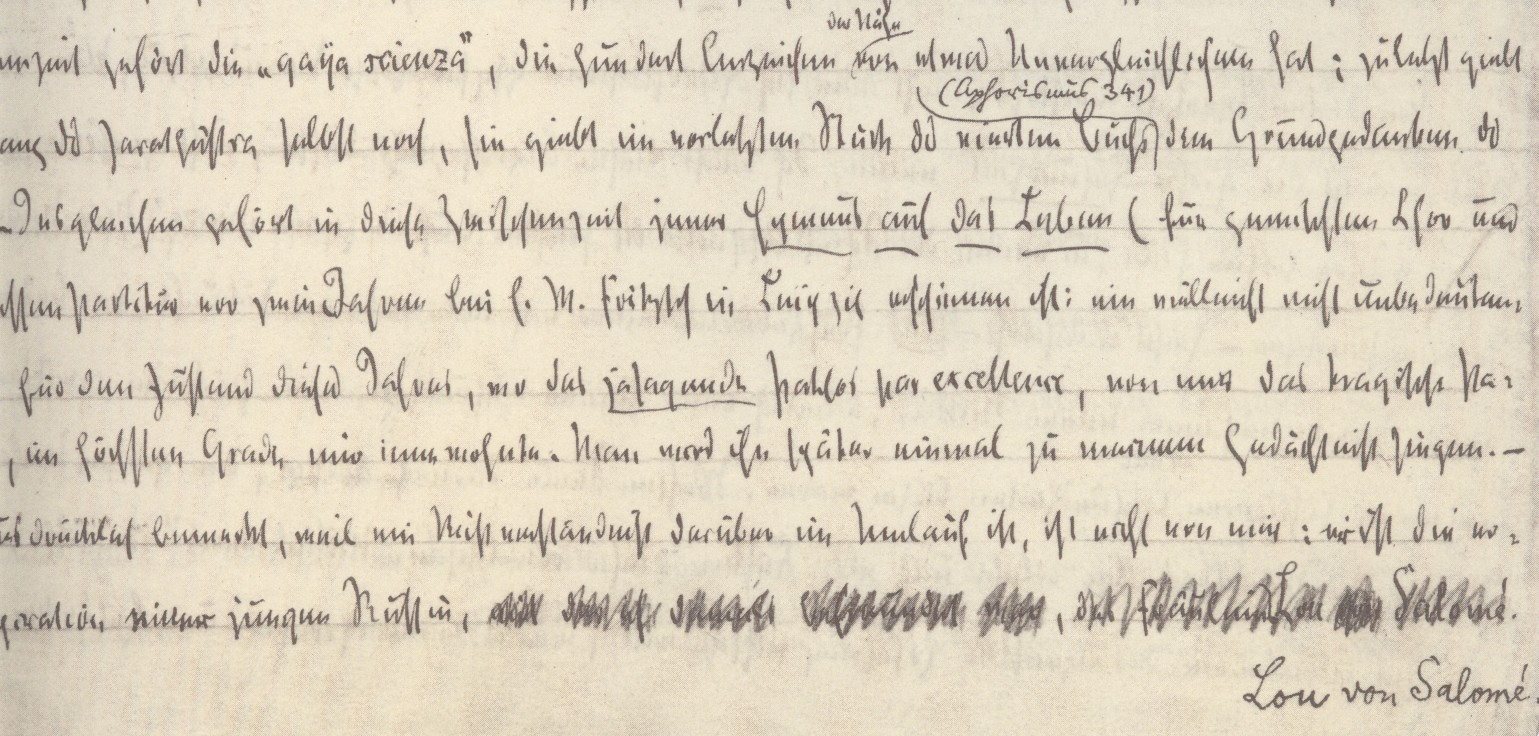
Peter Gast would "correct" Nietzsche's writings even after the philosopher's breakdown, and hence without his approval.

Nietzsche heavily criticized his sister and her husband, Bernhard Förster, speaking harshly against the "anti-Semitic canaille":

I've seen proof, black on white, that Herr Dr. Förster has not yet severed his connection with the anti-Semitic movement ... Since then I've had difficulty coming up with any of the tenderness and protectiveness I've so long felt toward you. The separation between us is thereby decided in really the most absurd way. Have you grasped nothing of the reason why I am in the world? ... Now it has gone so far that I have to defend myself hand and foot against people who confuse me with these anti-Semitic canaille; after my own sister, my former sister, and after Widemann more recently have given the impetus to this most dire of all confusions. After I read the name Zarathustra in the anti-Semitic Correspondence my forbearance came to an end. I am now in a position of emergency defense against your spouse's Party. These accursed anti-Semite deformities shall not sully my ideal!!

Draft for a letter to his sister Elisabeth Förster-Nietzsche (December 1887)

Nietzsche became very critical of pan-Germanism and nationalism after the Prussian victory over France. Although he participated in the war as a volunteer, he soon became disillusioned by the new German Empire, seeing the subsequent development in German culture as vulgar and triumphalist. Instead, he praised European identity and integration, predicting that developments in trade, industry and internal migrations would weaken the nations and result in a mixed European race and a unified continent that would play a more dominant role in world politics. He deeply disliked the Hohenzollern dynasty, especially due to their social policies accommodating the working class. In Ecce Homo (1888), Nietzsche criticized the "German nation" and its "will to power (to Empire, to Reich)", thus underscoring an easy misinterpretation of the Wille zur Macht, the conception of Germans as a "race", and the "anti-Semitic way of writing history", or of making "history conform to the German Empire", and stigmatized "nationalism, this national neurosis from which Europe is sick", this "small politics". Later in his life, he even started to identify as Polish, believing that his ancestors were Polish noblemen who migrated to Germany (both his Polish and aristocratic ancestry claims are usually rejected by biographers; see: Citizenship, nationality and ethnicity). Nietzsche's cosmopolitan proclamations are not without its detractors who point out that he retained a lifelong focus on German society and culture, with his last writings before insanity being about German politics. His hostile and mocking attitude towards Germany is sometimes also traced to his personal frustrations, the break-up of his friendship with Wagner and the very poor reception of his work in Germany.

Nietzsche had a positive view of Slavic people, but expressed mixed attitudes towards the Russian Empire, describing it in his earlier works as a hostile Asian power, while later praising the Tsarist autocracy for its opposition towards modernity, and the positive reception of his works in the aristocratic circles in Saint Petersburg. In Ecce Homo, he particularly praised French culture as superior to all others, especially German. However, his negative attitudes and national criticisms were not reserved only for Germany. In his last years, he made negative comments on cultural trends in French society and denounced many leading intellectuals of the era, such as Victor Hugo, George Sand, Émile Zola, the Goncourt brothers, Charles Augustin Sainte-Beuve, Charles Baudelaire, Auguste Comte and Ernest Renan. His most consistently negative attitudes were towards England, which he described as nation of shopkeepers, philistines, moral hypocrites and puritanical Christians. Disregarding the British colonial preeminence and the ability to escape revolutionary upheavals of the Continent, which were often admired among reactionary aristocratic authors of the era, Nietzsche's ire was mostly driven by British philosophical traditions, which he denounced as utilitarian, altruistic, and focused on lowly, plebeian goals of comfort and happiness. He held the same negative attitude toward the United States.

Nietzsche was an advocate of European colonialism, seeing it as a way to solve the overpopulation problem, pacify the rebellious working class, and rejuvenate the decadent European culture. European expansion and global domination were part of his "great politics". He noted that in colonies, Europeans often act as ruthless conquerors, unconstrained by Christian morality and democratic values, which he saw as a liberated, healthy instinct. He had even shown some initial interest in his brother-in-law's colonial project in Paraguay, Nueva Germania, despite the huge political differences between them, and for a while in the mid-1880s also considered migrating to a Swiss colony in Oaxaca, Mexico. He was especially interested in climate differences, believing that Northern Europe is an unhealthy habitat which stunts cultural development; similar ideas, were also held by Wagner and many of his followers.

Nietzsche titled aphorism 377 in the fifth book of The Gay Science (published in 1887) "We who are homeless" (Wir Heimatlosen), in which he criticized pan-Germanism and patriotism and called himself a "good European". In the second part of this aphorism, which according to Georges Bataille contained the most important parts of Nietzsche's political thought, the thinker of the Eternal Return stated:

No, we do not love humanity; but on the other hand we are not nearly "German" enough, in the sense in which the word "German" is constantly being used nowadays, to advocate nationalism and race hatred and to be able to take pleasure in the national scabies of the heart and blood poisoning that now leads the nations of Europe to delimit and barricade themselves against each other as if it were a matter of quarantine. For that we are too open-minded, too malicious, too spoiled, also too well-informed, too "traveled": we far prefer to live on mountains, apart, "untimely", in past or future centuries, merely in order to keep ourselves from experiencing the silent rage to which we know we should be condemned as eyewitnesses of politics that are desolating the German spirit by making it vain and that is, moreover, petty politics:—to keep its own creation from immediately falling apart again, is it not finding it necessary to plant it between two deadly hatreds? must it not desire the eternalization of the European system of a lot of petty states? ... We who are homeless are too manifold and mixed racially and in our descent, being "modern men", and consequently do not feel tempted to participate in the mendacious racial self-admiration and racial indecency that parades in Germany today as a sign of a German way of thinking and that is doubly false and obscene among the people of the "historical sense". We are, in one word—and let this be our word of honor!— good Europeans, the heirs of Europe, the rich, oversupplied, but also overly obligated heirs of thousands of years of European spirit: as such, we have also outgrown Christianity and are averse to it, and precisely because we have grown out of it, because our ancestors were Christians who in their Christianity were uncompromisingly upright; for their faith they willingly sacrificed possessions and position, blood and fatherland. We—do the same. For what? For our unbelief? For every kind of unbelief? No, you know better than that, my friends! The hidden Yes in you is stronger than all Nos and Maybes that afflict you and your age like a disease; and when you have to embark on the sea, you emigrants, you, too, are compelled to this by— a faith! ...

Bataille was one of the first to denounce the deliberate misinterpretation of Nietzsche carried out by Nazis, among them Alfred Baeumler. In January 1937, he dedicated an issue of Acéphale, titled "Reparations to Nietzsche", to the theme "Nietzsche and the Fascists." There, he called Elisabeth Förster-Nietzsche "Elisabeth Judas-Förster," recalling Nietzsche's declaration: "To never frequent anyone who is involved in this bare-faced fraud concerning races." Domenico Losurdo ridicules the idea that an "intellectually rather mediocre woman" managed to manipulate and derail interpretations of Nietzsche for decades and inspire political movements encompassing millions of people. He dismisses such idea as unsustainable conspiracy theory noting that "there is no shortage of unsettling and horrific passages in Nietzsche's writings". Due to his complex views and occasionally contradictory comments on these matters, the idea of Nietzsche as a predecessor to Nazism and fascism remains controversial and debated among scholars (see: Nietzsche and fascism). Owing largely to the writings of Walter Kaufmann and French postwar philosophers, Nietzsche's reputation improved and today he usually is not linked to Nazism as he was in the past. Detractors note that authors such as Houston Stewart Chamberlain and Arthur de Gobineau also had complex views on matters of politics, nation and race that were incompatible with Nazi ideology on numerous points, but their influence on the Third Reich is still not dismissed as a misunderstanding.

=== War and military values ===
In Human, All Too Human, a work of his more moderate middle period, Nietzsche wrote in a strongly pacifist vein: "The doctrine of the army as a means of self defence must be renounced just as completely as the thirst for conquest ... To disarm while being the best armed out of an elevation of sensibility - that is the means to real peace ... whereas the so-called armed peace such as now parades about in every country is a disposition to fractiousness which trusts neither itself nor its neighbour and fails to lay down its arms half out of hatred, half out of fear. Better to perish than to hate and fear, and twofold better to perish than to make oneself hated and feared - this must one day become the supreme maxim of every individual state!"

And yet, Nietzsche also made numerous comments later in his career in which he renounces pacifism, praises war, military values and conquests. Some of these can be read as metaphoric, but in others he refers to specific policies or military actions and commanders. Nietzsche volunteered for the Franco-Prussian war as a medical orderly, but soon became critical of Prussian militarism, mostly because of his disillusionment in German culture, nationalism and incipient antisemitism, thereby introducing many conflicts into his works when taken as a whole, which have thus confused those commentators who approach his works in the manner against which Nietzsche warned in 1879: "The worst readers are those who behave like plundering troops: they take away a few things they can use, dirty and confound the remainder, and revile the whole"

Despite his disillusionment with Prussian militarism and German nationalism Nietzsche did not renounce militarism in general. He admired Napoleon for reviving the military spirit which he saw as defense against the decadent rule of "modern ideas", "businessmen and philistines". And in his notebooks, which were edited by his sister Elizabeth and published after his death under the title The Will to Power, he wrote "When the instincts of a society ultimately make it give up war and renounce conquest, it is decadent: it is ripe for democracy and the rule of shopkeepers. In the majority of cases, it is true, assurances of peace are merely stupefying draughts. Thus while in private he entertained the idea of the military development of Europe contemplating conscription, polytechnic military education and the idea that all men of higher classes should be reserve officers in addition to their civilian jobs., writing "The maintenance of the military State is the last means of adhering to the great tradition of the past; or, where it has been lost, to revive it. By means of it the superior or strong type of man is preserved, and all institutions and ideas which perpetuate enmity and order of rank in States, such as national feeling, protective tariffs, etc., may on that account seem justified., in those writings he chose to publish, he unambiguously denounced "The nationalistic fever ... among the Germans of today, including now the anti-French stupidity, now the anti-Jewish, now the anti-Polish...", describing war as "a comedy that conceals" via the "pathological estrangement which the insanity of nationalism has induced." He opposed the "rule of mandarins" solving conflicts through hidden machinations instead of open war, and praises aristocratic "warriors" over common "soldiers," expressing doubts about arming and training the conscripted proletarian masses, seeing them as a potential revolutionary threat. He advocated European unity over partisan nationalism, and worried that modern wars among European nations might have dysgenic effect by sacrificing too many strong, brave individuals.

These many conflicting statements reflect Nietzsche's "war within" and demonstrate clearly what Karl Jaspers called "The Vortex": Jasper's observation that in Nietzsche's works we can always find the contradiction of any given statement he makes, which shows that Nietzsche was not seeking followers to slavishly parrot his "doctrines," but rather seeking to challenge his readers to think for themselves and cultivate their own autonomy.

=== Views on women ===
Nietzsche's views on women have served as a magnet for controversy, beginning during his life and continuing to the present. He frequently made remarks in his writing that some view as misogynistic. He stated in Twilight of the Idols (1888) "Women are considered profound. Why? Because we never fathom their depths. But women aren't even shallow."

== Relation to Schopenhauer ==
According to Santayana, Nietzsche considered his philosophy to be a correction of Schopenhauer's philosophy. In his Egotism in German Philosophy, Santayana listed Nietzsche's antithetical reactions to Schopenhauer:

The will to live would become the will to dominate; pessimism founded on reflection would become optimism founded on courage; the suspense of the will in contemplation would yield to a more biological account of intelligence and taste; finally in the place of pity and asceticism (Schopenhauer's two principles of morals) Nietzsche would set up the duty of asserting the will at all costs and being cruelly but beautifully strong. These points of difference from Schopenhauer cover the whole philosophy of Nietzsche.

These emendations show how Schopenhauer's philosophy was not a mere initial stimulus for Nietzsche, but formed the basis for much of Nietzsche's thinking.

Von Hartmann suggested that Schopenhauer was the only philosopher who has been systematically studied by Nietzsche.

== Relation to Philipp Mainländer ==
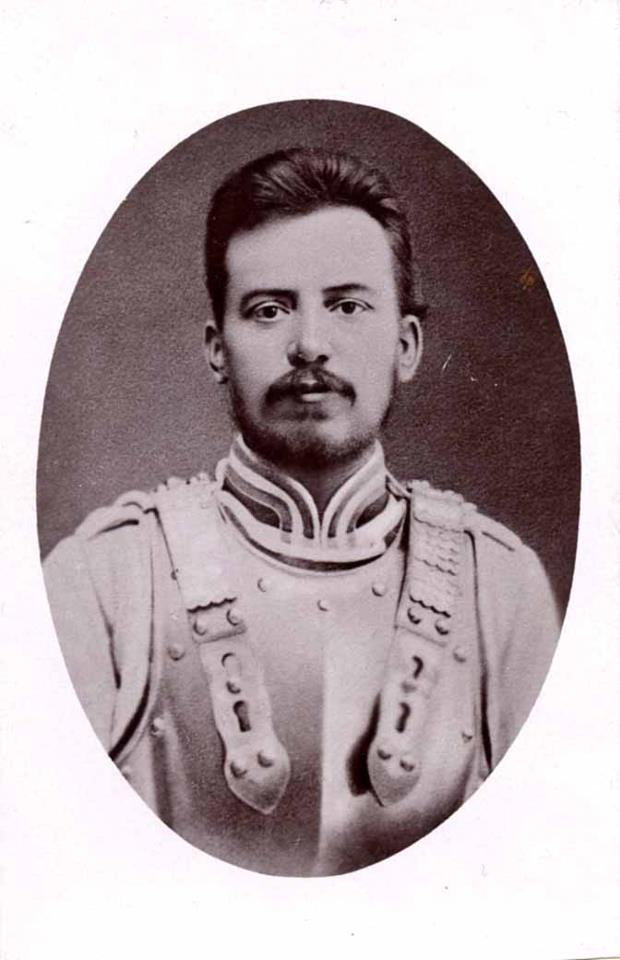
Philipp Mainländer

The work of Philipp Mainländer had an important impact on Nietzsche's intellectual development and made him distance himself from the philosophy of Schopenhauer. In Mainländer's 200 pages long criticism of Schopenhauer's philosophy, Mainländer argues against a metaphysical will behind the world, and argues instead for a real multiplicity of wills that struggle with each other.

Mainländer is perhaps best understood as a negative influence on Nietzsche. Mainländer took the pessimism of Schopenhauer to its ultimate conclusion and ended his own life. However, he did never recommend or argue for suicide – this is a common misconception – and aims to motivate those who abhor the world back to an active life with self-chosen goals. Mainländer is a hedonist and the goal of his ethics to indicate how man can reach the highest happiness. If life is worthless, then this must be used to attain a state of complete fearlessness.

Both Nietzsche and Mainländer owed their philosophical awakening to The World as Will and Representation, they disliked the popular successor of Schopenhauer, Eduard von Hartmann, both championed the individual and rejected traditional values, both proclaimed that God is dead (Mainländer had popularized the theme before Nietzsche). Their mental collapse has also drawn comparisons.

== Relation to Søren Kierkegaard ==
Nietzsche knew little of the 19th-century philosopher Søren Kierkegaard. Georg Brandes, a Danish philosopher, wrote to Nietzsche in 1888 asking him to study the works of Kierkegaard, to which Nietzsche replied that he would. (Note: Brandes and Nietzsche wrote letters back and forth between 1886–1888. In 1886 Nietzsche sent Brandes copies of Beyond Good and Evil (written in 1885) and later Genealogy of Morals and Human, All Too Human. (p. 314). Brandes sent Nietzsche a copy of Main Currents in 1888. (pp. 331–331) Nietzsche wrote in May of 1888 that "Dr. George Brandes is now delivering an important course of lectures at the University of Copenhagen on the German philosopher Freidrich Nietzsche! According to the papers these lectures are having the most brilliant success. The hall is full to overflowing each time; more than three hundred people present." (p. 227). "They were ready for my theory of 'master morality' owing to the thorough general knowledge they possess of the Icelandic sagas which provide very rich material for the theory. I am glad to hear that the Danish philologists approve and accept my derivation of bonus: in itself it seems rather a tall order to trace the concept 'good' back to the concept 'warrior'." (p. 229) On January 11, 1888 Brandes wrote the following to Nietzsche, "There is a Northern writer whose works would interest you, if they were but translated, Soren Kierkegaard. He lived from 1813 to 1855, and is in my opinion one of the profoundest psychologists to be met with anywhere. A little book which I have written about him (the translation published at Leipzig in 1879) gives me exhaustive idea of his genius, for the book is a kind of polemical tract written with the purpose of checking his influence. It is, nevertheless, from a psychological point of view, the finest work I have published." (p. 325) Nietzsche wrote back that he would "tackle Kierkegaard's psychological problems" (p. 327) and then Brandes asked if he could get a copy of everything Nietzsche had published. (p. 343) so he could spread his "propaganda". (p. 348, 360–361) Selected Letters of Friedrich Nietzsche 1st ed. edited, with a preface, by Oscar Levy; authorized translation by Anthony M. Ludovici Published 1921 by Doubleday, Page & Co)

Recent research, however, suggests that Nietzsche was exposed to the works of Kierkegaard through secondary literature. Aside from Brandes, Nietzsche owned and read a copy of Hans Lassen Martensen's Christliche Ethik (1873) in which Martensen extensively quoted and wrote about Kierkegaard's individualism in ethics and religion. Nietzsche also read Harald Høffding's Psychologie in Umrissen auf Grundlage der Erfahrung (ed. 1887) which expounded and critiqued Kierkegaard's psychology. Thomas Brobjer believes one of the works Nietzsche wrote about Kierkegaard is in Morgenröthe, which was partly written in response to Martensen's work. In one of the passages, Nietzsche wrote: "Those moralists, on the other hand, who, following in the footsteps of Socrates, offer the individual a morality of self-control and temperance as a means to his own advantage, as his personal key to happiness, are the exceptions." Brobjer believes Kierkegaard is one of "those moralists".

The first philosophical study comparing Kierkegaard and Nietzsche was published even before Nietzsche's death. More than 60 articles and 15 full-length studies have been published devoted entirely in comparing these two thinkers.

== Legacy ==
Perhaps Nietzsche's greatest philosophical legacy lies in his 20th century interpreters, among them Pierre Klossowski, Martin Heidegger, Georges Bataille, Leo Strauss, Alexandre Kojève, Michel Foucault, Deleuze and Guattari, Jacques Derrida and Albert Camus. Foucault's later writings, for example, adopt Nietzsche's genealogical method to develop anti-foundationalist theories of power that divide and fragment rather than unite politics (as evinced in the liberal tradition of political theory). The systematic institutionalisation of criminal delinquency, sexual identity and practice, and the mentally ill (to name but a few) are examples used by Foucault to demonstrate how knowledge or truth is inseparable from the institutions that formulate notions of legitimacy from "immoralities" such as homosexuality and the like (captured in the famous power-knowledge equation). Deleuze, arguably the foremost of Nietzsche's interpreters, used the much-maligned "will to power" thesis in tandem with Marxian notions of commodity surplus and Freudian ideas of desire to articulate concepts such the rhizome and other "outsides" to state power as traditionally conceived.

Certain recent Nietzschean interpretations have emphasized the more untimely and politically controversial aspects of Nietzsche's philosophy. Nietzschean commentator Keith Ansell Pearson has pointed out the absurdity of modern egalitarian liberals, socialists, communists and anarchists claiming Nietzsche as a herald of their own left-wing politics: "The values Nietzsche wishes to subject to a revaluation are largely altruistic and egalitarian values such as pity, self-sacrifice, and equal rights. For Nietzsche, modern politics rests largely on a secular inheritance of Christian values (he interprets the socialist doctrine of equality in terms of a secularization of the Christian belief in the equality of all souls before God"). Works such as Bruce Detwiler's Nietzsche and the Politics of Aristocratic Radicalism, Fredrick Appel's Nietzsche contra Democracy, and Domenico Losurdo's Nietzsche, il ribelle aristocratico challenge the prevalent liberal interpretive consensus on Nietzsche and assert that Nietzsche's elitism was not merely an aesthetic pose but an ideological attack on the widely held belief in equal rights of the modern West, locating Nietzsche in the conservative-revolutionary tradition.

== See also ==
- North American Nietzsche Society
