= The blond beast =

The Blond(e) Beast may refer to:

- A metaphor used in On the Genealogy of Morality by Friedrich Nietzsche
- A nickname for Reinhard Heydrich, a German Nazi official
