= Cult of the dead (disambiguation) =

The cult of the dead is the practice of venerating the dead.

Cult of the dead may also refer to:

- Cult of the Dead, a 2008 album by Legion of the Damned

== See also ==
- Cult of the Dead Cow, an American hacker group
- Death cult (disambiguation)
