= Twilight of the Idols =

1889 book by Friedrich Nietzsche

Twilight of the Idols or, How to Philosophize with a Hammer
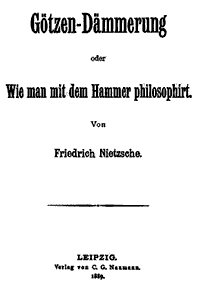
- Author: Friedrich Nietzsche
- Original title: Götzen-Dämmerung
- Translator: R. J. Hollingdale
- Language: German
- Publication date: 1889
- Publication place: Germany
- Media type: Print (Hardcover and Paperback)
- Pages: 208 (1990 Penguin Classics ed.)
- ISBN: 978-0140445145
- OCLC: 22578979
- Preceded by: The Case of Wagner (1888)
- Followed by: The Antichrist (1888)

Twilight of the Idols, or, How to Philosophize with a Hammer (German: Götzen-Dämmerung, oder, Wie man mit dem Hammer philosophiert) is a book by Friedrich Nietzsche, written in 1888, and published in 1889.

== Genesis ==
Twilight of the Idols was written in just over a week, between 26 August and 3 September 1888, while Nietzsche was on holiday in Sils Maria. Nietzsche wrote about Twilight in a letter: "This style is my philosophy in a nutshell—radical to the point of criminality..."

The latter title, Götzen-Dämmerung in German, is a pun on the title of Richard Wagner's opera Götterdämmerung, or "Twilight of the Gods". Götze is a German word for "idol" or "false god". Walter Kaufmann has suggested that in his use of the word Nietzsche might be indebted to Francis Bacon who used the concept of the idol in his philosophy.

== Synopsis ==
Nietzsche criticizes German culture of the day as unsophisticated, decadent and nihilistic, and shoots some disapproving arrows at key French, English, and Italian cultural figures who represent similar tendencies. In contrast to all these alleged representatives of cultural decadence, Nietzsche applauds Caesar, Napoleon, Goethe, Thucydides and the Sophists as healthier and stronger types. The book states the transvaluation of all values as Nietzsche's final and most important project, and gives a view of antiquity wherein the Romans for once take precedence over the ancient Greeks, albeit only in the field of literature.

The book is divided into twelve sections:

=== Foreword ===
In the foreword, Nietzsche says that the book is an escape into the idle hours of a psychologist. He then calls his book a "Great Declaration of War", saying he intends to sound out famous idols with a hammer. He inscribes it with the date 30 September 1888.

=== Maxims and Arrows ===
This section comprises 44 short maxims that introduce the main themes of the work.

==== Maxim number eight ====
Out of life’s school of war—What does not kill me makes me stronger. (German Was mich nicht umbringt, macht mich stärker)

Nietzsche elaborates on this theme in Ecce Homo, published shortly after Twilight of the Idols, stating that "...to an intrinsically sound nature, illness may even constitute a powerful stimulus to life, to a surplus of life. ... He divines remedies for injuries; he knows how to turn serious accidents to his own advantage; that which does not kill him makes him stronger." As an illustration of this principle in practice, Nietzsche explains that his own overcoming of pessimism occurred during a period of dramatic downturn in his health, writing that "it was during those years in which my vitality reached its lowest point that I ceased from being a pessimist: the instinct of self-recovery forbade my holding to a philosophy of poverty and desperation."

==== Maxim number 12 ====
If a man knows the wherefore of his existence, then the manner of it can take care of itself. Man does not aspire to happiness; only the Englishman does that.

In Twilight of the Idols, Nietzsche makes twenty-two sarcastic or sardonic quips about the English, forty-one about women, over one hundred about the Germans.

==== Maxim number 31 ====
When stepped on, a worm doubles up. That is clever. In that way he lessens the probability of being stepped on again. In the language of morality: humility.

Nietzsche elaborates on his opinion of humility in On the Genealogy of Morality. He considers virtues such as humility, patience, and compassion as qualities useful to the weak. Therefore, the weak praise qualities that ease their suffering. Aphorism 31 echoes the idea of humility serving the purpose of reducing the chances of suffering.

=== The Problem of Socrates ===
Throughout history, Nietzsche asserts, the most learned seem to have shared a common belief that life is worthless. Nietzsche argues that this idea was not a symptom of a healthy society but of one in decline. Philosophers such as Socrates or Plato, Nietzsche explains, shared a common physiological disposition to feel negatively about life, which reflected the decay of the superior Greek culture that preceded them.

Nietzsche holds Socrates in special contempt. Socrates, he believes, was ugly (a symptom or feature of his inner weakness and decadence) and was a product of the "lower orders" of society. Nietzsche singles out two particular ideas of Socrates for attack. The first is the interconnectedness of reason, virtue, and happiness. The second is Socrates's introduction of the dialectic method to philosophy (the process by which two or more people with different points of view reach a conclusion through a process of discourse, logic, and reason, also called the Socratic method). Nietzsche thought that the dialectic allowed weaker philosophical positions and less sophisticated thinkers to gain too large a foothold in a society. Nietzsche's program valued instinct over reason, but because of Socrates and the dialectic, Greek culture now became "absurdly rational." A key part of Nietzsche's thesis is that "happiness and instinct are one," but reason stands in direct opposition to instinct.

Ultimately, Nietzsche insisted, the value of life cannot be estimated, and any judgment concerning it only reveals the person's life-denying or life-affirming tendencies.

=== Reason in Philosophy ===
Nietzsche denies many of Plato's ideas, specifically that of Being and Becoming, the world of the forms, and the fallibility of the senses. More precisely, he does not believe that one should refute the senses, as Plato did. This goes against Nietzsche's ideals of human excellence in that it is a symptom of personal decadence. By decadence, Nietzsche is referring to a fading of life, and vitality and an embrace of weakness. In Nietzsche's view, if one is to accept a non-sensory, unchanging world as superior and our sensory world as inferior, then one is adopting a hatred of nature and thus a hatred of the sensory world – the world of the living. Nietzsche postulates that only one who is weak, sickly or ignoble would subscribe to such a belief.

Nietzsche goes on to relate this obsession with the non-physical realm to Christianity and the concept of Heaven. Nietzsche indicates that the belief in the Christian God is similar to the decadence and hatred of life. Given that Christians believe in Heaven, which is in concept similar to Plato's ideas of the world of forms (a changeless, eternal world) and that Christians divide the world into the "real" (heaven) and the apparent (living) world, they too hate nature.

=== How the "True World" Finally Became Fiction ===
In this section, Nietzsche demonstrates the process by which previous philosophers have fictionalized the apparent world, casting the product of the senses into doubt, and thereby removing the concept of the real world. The section is divided into six parts:

1. The wise and pious man dwells in the real world, which he attains through his wisdom (skills in perception warrant a more accurate view of the real world).
2. The wise and pious man doesn't dwell in the real world, but rather it is promised to him, a goal to live for. (ex: to the sinner who repents)
3. The real world is unattainable and cannot be promised, yet remains a consolation when confronted with the perceived injustices of the apparent world.
4. If the real world is not attained, then it is unknown. Therefore, there is no duty to the real world, and no consolation derived from it.
5. The idea of a real world has become useless—it provides no consolation or motive. It is therefore cast aside as a useless abstraction.
6. What world is left? The concept of the real world has been abolished, and with it, the idea of an apparent world follows. The final words: "Noon; moment of the shortest shadow; end of the longest error; high point of humanity; INCIPIT ZARATHUSTRA".

=== Morality as Anti-Nature ===
Nietzsche is not a hedonist, arguing that any passions in excess can "drag their victim down with the weight of their folly." However, he maintains that it is possible for the passions to ultimately become "spiritualized." Christianity, he criticizes, instead deals with immoderate passions by attempting to remove the passion completely. In an analogy, Nietzsche claims that the Christian approach to morality is not much different than how an unskilled dentist might treat any tooth pain by removing the tooth entirely rather than pursue other less aggressive and equally effective treatments. Christianity doesn't attempt to "spiritualize, beautify, deify a desire," which leads Nietzsche to conclude that the Christian Church is "hostile to life." Taking a psychological turn, Nietzsche writes that people who want to exterminate certain passions outright do so mainly because they are "too weak-willed, too degenerate to impose moderation" upon their own selves.

Nietzsche develops his idea of spiritualizing the passions through examining the concepts of love and enmity. Love, he claims, is actually the "spiritualization of sensuality." Enmity, on the other hand, spiritualizes the state of having enemies since having opponents helps us to define and strengthen our own positions. Even with the anti-Christian sentiment that pervades his thinking, Nietzsche makes it very clear that he has no interest in eliminating the Christian Church. Instead, he recognizes that his own philosophical program would be neither as effective or necessary without it. If his enemy the Church denies the "instincts of life," this helps him to develop a position that affirms them. Using theological language, Nietzsche insists that the real "blasphemy" is the Christian "rebellion against life." Christian morality is ultimately symptomatic of a "declining, debilitated, weary, condemned life."

Nietzsche concludes that insisting people ought to be one way and not another leads to a form of bigotry that devalues the goodness of human diversity, the "enchanting wealth of types." Also, the belief that people can truly change their nature disregards the fact that any person is a "piece of fate." It is not possible for a person to divorce himself from either the past events or present circumstances that cause them to be who they are. Ultimately, Nietzsche concludes that it is "immoralists" such as himself who have the highest respect for inherent worth of individuals because they do not value one person's approach to life over any others.

=== The Four Great Errors ===
In the chapter The Four Great Errors, he suggests that people, especially Christians, confuse the effect for the cause, and that they project the human ego and subjectivity on to other things, thereby creating the illusionary concept of being, and therefore also of the thing-in-itself and God. In reality, motive or intention is "an accompaniment to an act" rather than the cause of that act. By removing causal agency based on free, conscious will, Nietzsche critiques the ethics of accountability, suggesting that everything is necessary in a whole that can neither be judged nor condemned, because there is nothing outside of it. What people typically deem "vice" is in fact merely "the inability not to react to a stimulus." In this light, the concept of morality becomes purely a means of control: "the doctrine of will has been invented essentially for the purpose of punishment, that is of finding guilty."

Men were thought of as free so that they could become guilty: consequently, every action had to be thought of as willed, the origin of every action as lying in the consciousness... ...Today, when we have started to move in the reverse direction, when we immoralists especially are trying with all our might to remove the concept of guilt and the concept of punishment from the world and to purge psychology, history, nature, the social institutions and sanctions of them, there is in our eyes no more radical opposition than that of the theologians, who continue to infect the innocence of becoming with 'punishment' and 'guilt' by means of the concept of the 'moral world-order'. Christianity is a hangman's metaphysics. The Four Great Errors

=== The 'Improvers' of Mankind ===
In this passage, Nietzsche proclaims his lack of belief of an objective morality, stating that there is no such thing as moral fact. With this information, he lists two examples of cases where moralization of humankind was attempted, despite the lack of complete moral truth. The people pushing for this morality are called 'improvers' by Nietzsche, the quotes representing the fact that these certain people fail at their goal of improving man.

The first of these examples is that of religion. In this example, Nietzsche tells a fictional story of a priest who converts a man to Christianity, in order to keep him moral. However, his man eventually falls into basic human instinct such as lust, and is thus labeled as a sinner. Afterwards, the man is full of hatred, and is ostracized by others. The priest in this story represents the 'improver,' as he attempts to moralize someone, but only makes the man's life miserable.

The second of these examples is that of the caste system sanctioned by Manusmriti in India. This system made an attempt of moralizing man by making regulations on even breeding of no more than 4 races, and thus dehumanizing the Tschandala who were outcasts. The 'improvers' in this scenario is Manusmriti, and it contributes to the moral-prejudices against people in order to enforce Aryan values.

=== What the Germans Lack ===
In examining German society of his day, Nietzsche attributes any advantage Germans hold over other European countries to basic ethical virtues and not to any cultural sophistication. Nietzsche attributes the decline he sees in the sophistication in German thought to prioritizing politics over the intellect. The state and culture are in tension because one of the pair thrives at the expense of the other.

Culture and the state--one should not deceive oneself over this--are antagonists: the ′cultural state′ is merely a modern idea. The one lives off the other, the one thrives at the expense of the other. All great cultural epochs are epochs of political decline: that which is great in the cultural sense has been unpolitical, even anti-political.

Nietzsche also attributes this decline in the German intellect to problems he saw in higher education in his day. First, Nietzsche calls into question the qualifications of college instructors, insisting on the need for "educators who are themselves educated." Educators, he argues, are vital to teach three key skills: seeing (the ability to think before acting on impulse), thinking ("Thinking has to be learned in the way dancing has to be learned."), and speaking and writing ("One has to be able to dance with the pen."). Second, he is highly critical of opening colleges and universities to all classes of society, because when stripped of its "privilege," the quality of higher education declines. "All higher education belongs to the exceptions alone: one must be privileged to have a right to so high a privilege. Great and fine things can never be common property."

=== Skirmishes of an Untimely Man ===
In the longest chapter of the book, Nietzsche examines a variety of cultural figures of his day. He also makes a number of psychological observations about what leads to adopting different attitudes about life.

=== What I Owe to the Ancients ===
Nietzsche criticizes Plato, accusing him of "over-morality" and calling him an "exalted swindle." He goes further to claim that "Christianity is Platonism for the people" in its harmful morality. He argues against what he sees as Plato's hatred of life to argue that humans need to value life despite the suffering. He refers to the Dionysian Mysteries to argue that we need to answer a triumphant yes to life, and that even pain is holy. He also refers to the eternal recurrence, his thought experiment that asks if you would be happy if you found out you had to live the same life over and over down to the last detail unknowingly (Nietzsche thinks the answer should be yes), to encourage people to embrace and celebrate life. Nietzsche believes that to be oneself is "the eternal joy of becoming."

=== The Hammer Speaks ===
Nietzsche speaks of Part III 'Of Old and New Law Tablets' in Thus Spoke Zarathustra.

== Bibliography ==
- Bernd Magnus: The Deification of the Commonplace: Twilight of the Idols, in: Solomon, Robert C. / Higgins, Kathleen M. (ed.): Reading Nietzsche, New York / Oxford 1988, pp. 152–181.
- Duncan Large: Götzen-Dämmerung from the Perspective of Translation Studies, in: Nietzscheforschung. Jahrbuch der Nietzsche-Gesellschaft 16: Nietzsche im Film, Projektionen und Götzen-Dämmerungen, Berlin 2009, pp. 151–160.
- Andreas Urs Sommer: Kommentar zu Nietzsches Der Fall Wagner. Götzendämmerung (= Heidelberger Akademie der Wissenschaften (ed.): Historischer und kritischer Kommentar zu Friedrich Nietzsches Werken, vol. 6/1). XVII + 698 pages. Berlin / Boston: Walter de Gruyter 2012 (ISBN 978-3-11-028683-0).
