= Friedrich Nietzsche and free will =

The 19th-century philosopher Friedrich Nietzsche was an influential critic of the concept of free will. Nietzsche's critique of free will informed his wider argument against Judeo-Christian morality and religious guilt.

== Background: Schopenhauer's views on freedom ==
Nietzsche's views on freedom were inspired by those of Arthur Schopenhauer. Nietzsche, like Schopenhauer, assigned the "will" a key status in his philosophy, as seen in his concept of the will to power. However, the will was for Nietzsche not a general metaphysical principle (as for Schopenhauer), but a feature of organic life.

In his essay On the Freedom of the Will (1839), Schopenhauer distinguishes mere "physical freedom" from moral freedom. To be physically free is to act according only to one's will – that is, to act unrestrained by coercion or force. However, a more radical moral freedom – of the kind embraced by Immanuel Kant – would mean autonomously controlling the will itself, or willing one's own will. Schopenhauer denies that this stronger form of freedom is possible.

The Gay Science (1882), Nietzsche praises Schopenhauer's "immortal doctrines of the intellectuality of intuition, the apriority of the law of causality (...) and the non-freedom of the will".

== Nietzsche's critiques of free will ==
=== Metaphysical determinism ===
In Human, All Too Human (1878) Nietzsche appears to defend a deterministic metaphysical stance, writing:

At the sight of a waterfall we think we see in the countless curvings, twistings, and breakings of the waves capriciousness and freedom of will; but everything here is necessary, every motion mathematically calculable. So it is too in the case of human actions; if one were all-knowing, one would be able to calculate every individual action, likewise every advance in knowledge, every error, every piece of wickedness. The actor himself, to be sure, is fixed in the illusion of free will.

However, Nietzsche's determinism was unusual, as he did not believe that the material universe was governed by physical laws. He critiqued what he termed the "physicist's" conception of “conformity of nature to law", claiming that nature "follows a “necessary” and “calculable” course "not because laws are dominant in it, but rather because laws are totally absent, and every power draws its final consequences at every moment."

=== Chance ===
As Nietzsche believed that the universe was both determined and lawless, he concluded that it was essentially governed by chance. What seems like purposive behaviour is in fact the result of chance events followed by their determined conclusions. However, the prospect of a universe without purpose could be emancipatory rather than oppressive. In Thus Spoke Zarathustra (1883-5), Nietzsche writes:

[I]t is a blessing and not a blasphemy when I teach that "above all things there stands the heaven of chance, the heaven of innocence, the heaven of hazard, the heaven of wantonness." "Of Hazard" — that is the oldest nobility in the world; that gave I back to all things; I emancipated them from bondage under purpose.

Philosopher Ian Hacking, in The Taming of Chance (1990), suggests that Nietzsche was the most "passionate spokesman" of "pure irregularity". This is because he "grasped the most difficult philosophical lesson about chance", which is that "Necessity and chance are twinned, and neither can exist without the other."

Philosopher Gilles Deleuze writes that "what Nietzsche calls necessity (destiny) is (...) never the abolition but rather the combination of chance itself".

=== Moral responsibility and guilt ===
In Beyond Good and Evil (1886), Nietzsche argues that free will is an error resulting from the desire to hold individuals morally accountable, coupled with the fallacious notion of the causa sui ("self-caused cause"):

The causa sui is the best self-contradiction that has ever been conceived, a type of logical rape and abomination. But humanity’s excessive pride has got itself profoundly and horribly entangled with precisely this piece of nonsense. The longing for “freedom of the will” in the superlative meta-physical sense (which, unfortunately, still rules in the heads of the half-educated), the longing to bear the entire and ultimate responsibility for your actions yourself and to relieve God, world, ancestors, chance, and society of the burden — all this means nothing less than being that very causa sui and, with a courage greater than Münchhausen’s, pulling yourself by the hair from the swamp of nothingness up into existence.

In Twilight of the Idols (1889), Nietzsche emphasises his belief that the concept of "free will" is a manipulative fiction, serving only to make individuals feel guilty about circumstances which are not truly within their control:

Error of free will. —Today we have no sympathy anymore for the concept of “free will”: we know only too well what it is— the most disreputable of all the theologians’ tricks, designed to make humanity “responsible” in the theologians’ sense, that is, to make it dependent on them (...) the doctrine of the will was essentially invented for purposes of punishment, that is, for purposes of wanting to find people guilty. All the old psychology, the psychology of will, is predicated on the fact that its originators, the priests in the elites of ancient communities, wanted to create a right for themselves to inflict punishments —or wanted to create a right for God to do so.

The paragraph's conclusion summarises Nietzsche's thoughts on the matter:

Human beings were thought to be “free” so that they could be ruled, so that they could be punished – so that they could become guilty.

=== Error of personal identity ===
In On the Genealogy of Morality (1887), Nietzsche suggests that the error of free will is linked to the error of personal identity:

Just as the common people separates lightning from its flash and takes the latter to be a deed, something performed by a subject, which is called lightning, popular morality separates strength from the manifestations of strength, as though there were an indifferent substra-tum behind the strong person which had the freedom to manifest strength or not. But there is no such substratum; there is no ‘being’ behind the deed, its effect and what becomes of it; ‘the doer’ is invented as an after-thought,—the doing is everything.

In Twilight of the Idols, he reiterates that the notion of the causal "subject" is a mistake produced by the illusion of free will:

The conception of a consciousness ("spirit") as a cause, and later also that of the ego as cause (the "subject"), are only afterbirths: first the causality of the will was firmly accepted as given, as empirical.

== Nietzsche's responses to the problem of free will ==
=== Strong and weak wills ===
In Beyond Good and Evil, Nietzsche suggests that the will of an individual, even if not free, can nevertheless be judged according to its "strength":

The “un-free will” is mythology; in real life it is only a matter of strong and weak wills.

He therefore described the strong-willed "sovereign individual" as possessing a kind of freedom:

If (...) we place ourselves at the end of the enormous process, where the tree finally produces its fruit, where society and its morality of custom finally brings to light that to which it was only the means: then we will find as the ripest fruit on its tree the sovereign individual, the individual resembling only himself, free again from the morality of custom, autonomous and supermoral (for ‘autonomous’ and ‘moral’ are mutually exclusive), in short, the human being with his own independent long will, the human who is permitted to promise —and in him a proud consciousness, twitching in all its muscles, of what has finally been achieved and become flesh in him, a true consciousness of power and freedom, a feeling of the completion of man himself.

=== Affirmation and Amor fati ===
Nietzsche believed that the "sovereign individual" was one who would embrace fate, affirming their destiny by adopting a stance termed "amor fati" and so realising the will to power. He wrote in Ecce Homo (1908):

My formula for greatness in man is! amor fati: the fact that a man wishes nothing to be different, either in front of him or behind him, or for all eternity. Not only must the necessary be borne, and on no account concealed,—all idealism is falsehood in the face of necessity,—but it must also be loved.

=== The 'great liberation' from moral responsibility ===
Nietzsche held that rejecting moral responsibility and religious guilt in favour of amor fati could be liberating:

What can be our doctrine alone?—That nobody gives human beings their qualities, neither God, nor society, nor their parents and ancestors, nor they themselves (...) Nobody is responsible for being here in the first place, for being constituted in such and such a way, for being in these circumstances, in this environment. The fatality of our essence cannot be separated from the fatality of all that was and will be. We are not the consequence of a special intention, a will, a goal; we are not being used in an attempt to reach an “ideal of humanity,” or an “ideal of happiness,” or an “ideal of morality”—it is absurd to want to divert our essence towards some goal. We have invented the concept “goal”: in reality, goals are absent... One is necessary, one is a piece of destiny, one belongs to the whole, one is in the whole.—There is nothing that could rule, measure, compare, judge our being, for that would mean ruling, measuring, comparing, and judging the whole... But there is nothing outside the whole!—That nobody is made responsible anymore, that no way of being may be traced back to a causa prima [first cause], that the world is not a unity either as sensorium or as “spirit,” only this is the great liberation—in this way only, the innocence of becoming is restored... The concept “God” was up to now the greatest objection against existence... We deny God, and in denying God we deny responsibility: only thus do we redeem the world.

=== Final views ===
In The Will to Power, posthumously assembled from his final notebooks of 1888 and 1889, Nietzsche can be found divorcing himself from both sides of the usual debate on free will:

Free will or no free will?—There is no such thing as "Will": that is only a simplified conception on the part of the understanding, like "matter."

Nietzsche's views on freedom were inspired by those of Arthur Schopenhauer. In The Gay Science, Nietzsche praises Schopenhauer's "immortal doctrines of the intellectuality of intuition, the apriority of the law of causality, (...) and the non-freedom of the will".

== See also ==
- Jacques the Fatalist
- Force majeure
- Free will
- Will to power
- On the Freedom of the Will
- Chance and Necessity
