= Ressentiment =

Concept in existentialism

In philosophy, ressentiment (/rəˌsɒ̃.tiˈmɒ̃/; French pronunciation: [ʁə.sɑ̃.ti.mɑ̃]) is one of the forms of resentment or hostility. The concept was of particular interest to some 19th-century thinkers, most notably Friedrich Nietzsche. According to his use, ressentiment is a sense of hostility directed toward an object that one identifies as the cause of one's frustration, that is, an assignment of blame for one's frustration. The sense of weakness or inferiority complex and perhaps even jealousy in the face of the "cause" generates a rejecting/justifying value system, or morality, which attacks or denies the perceived source of one's frustration. This value system is then used as a means of justifying one's own weaknesses by identifying the source of envy as objectively inferior, serving as a defense mechanism that prevents the resentful individual from addressing and overcoming their insecurities and flaws. The ego creates an enemy to insulate themselves from culpability.

== History ==
Ressentiment as a concept gained popularity with Friedrich Nietzsche's writings. Walter Kaufmann ascribes his use of the term in part to the absence of a proper equivalent term in the German language, contending that this absence alone "would be sufficient excuse for Nietzsche", if not for a translator. The term came to form a key part of his ideas concerning the psychology of the 'master–slave' question (articulated in Beyond Good and Evil), and the resultant birth of morality. Nietzsche's chief development of ressentiment came in his book On the Genealogy of Morals; see esp §§ 10–11).

The term was also studied by German philosopher Max Scheler in a monograph published in 1912 and reworked a few years later.

Søren Kierkegaard has been questionably included in the philosophical history of the term ressentiment. An English translation of Kierkegaard's essay "The Present Age" was published in 1940. The original Danish edition of "The Present Age" was published as part of 'A Literary Review' in 1846. The English translator of "The Present Age," Alexander Dru, translated certain uses of the Danish word that is typically translated as 'envy' instead as 'ressentiment,' although the French word 'ressentiment' does not appear even once in the original Danish edition. A subsequent edition of Dru's translation of "The Present Age" was published in 1962 and included an introduction by Walter Kaufmann in which Kaufmann remarks that the Danish word 'Misundelse' was translated in both the 1940 and 1962 editions as 'ressentiment.' In the 1940 edition Dru explains this translation by citing Max Scheler's L'homme du Ressentiment, a French translation of Scheler's work on ressentiment. Kaufmann expresses his discontent with this explanation and states, "A detailed comparison of Kierkegaard, Nietzsche, and Scheler might be rewarding; but not giving us the original word at all and not rendering it literally, say, as envy (the best German translation says Neid, which is envy), but rather with a technical term from another man's philosophy, forestalls comparison, analysis, and needful thought." A more recent English translation of "The Present Age," published asTwo Ages: A Literary Review translates 'Misundelse' as 'envy.'

Currently of great import as a term widely used in psychology and existentialism, ressentiment is viewed as an influential force for the creation of identities, moral frameworks and value systems. However, there is debate as to what validity these resultant value systems have, and to what extent they are maladaptive and destructive.

== Perspectives ==
=== Kierkegaard and Nietzsche ===
Kierkegaard:

"It is a fundamental truth of human nature that man is incapable of remaining permanently on the heights, of continuing to admire anything. Human nature needs variety. Even in the most enthusiastic ages people have always liked to joke enviously about their superiors. That is perfectly in order and is entirely justifiable so long as after having laughed at the great they can once more look upon them with admiration; otherwise the game is not worth the candle. In that way ressentiment finds an outlet even in an enthusiastic age. And as long as an age, even though less enthusiastic, has the strength to give ressentiment its proper character and has made up its mind what its expression signifies, ressentiment has its own, though dangerous importance.

…the more reflection gets the upper hand and thus makes people indolent, the more dangerous ressentiment becomes, because it no longer has sufficient character to make it conscious of its significance. Bereft of that character reflection is a cowardly and vacillating, and according to circumstances interprets the same thing in a variety of way. It tries to treat it as a joke, and if that fails, to regard it as an insult, and when that fails, to dismiss it as nothing at all; or else it will treat the thing as a witticism, and if that fails then say that it was meant as a moral satire deserving attention, and if that does not succeed, add that it was not worth bothering about.

…ressentiment becomes the constituent principle of want of character, which from utter wretchedness tries to sneak itself a position, all the time safeguarding itself by conceding that it is less than nothing. The ressentiment which results from want of character can never understand that eminent distinction really is distinction. Neither does it understand itself by recognizing distinction negatively (as in the case of ostracism) but wants to drag it down, wants to belittle it so that it really ceases to be distinguished. And ressentiment not only defends itself against all existing forms of distinction but against that which is still to come.

…The ressentiment which is establishing itself is the process of leveling, and while a passionate age storms ahead setting up new things and tearing down old, raising and demolishing as it goes, a reflective and passionless age does exactly the contrary; it hinders and stifles all action; it levels. Leveling is a silent, mathematical, and abstract occupation which shuns upheavals. In a burst of momentary enthusiasm people might, in their despondency, even long for a misfortune in order to feel the powers of life, but the apathy which follows is no more helped by a disturbance than an engineer leveling a piece of land. At its most violent a rebellion is like a volcanic eruption and drowns every other sound. At its maximum the leveling process is a deathly silence in which one can hear one’s own heart beat, a silence which nothing can pierce, in which everything is engulfed, powerless to resist. One man can be at the head a rebellion, but no one can be at the head of the leveling process alone, for in that case he would be leader and would thus escape being leveled. Each individual within his own little circle can co-operate in the leveling, but it is an abstract power, and the leveling process is the victory of abstraction over the individual. The leveling process in modern times, corresponds, in reflection, to fate in antiquity.

...It must be obvious to everyone that the profound significance of the leveling process lies in the fact that it means the predominance of the category ‘generation’ over the category ‘individuality’." —Søren Kierkegaard, The Present Age (Alexander Dru tr.), 1962, pp. 49–52

Nietzsche:

The problem with the other origin of the “good,” of the good man, as the person of ressentiment has thought it out for himself, demands some conclusion. It is not surprising that the lambs should bear a grudge against the great birds of prey, but that is no reason for blaming the great birds of prey for taking the little lambs. And when the lambs say among themselves, "These birds of prey are evil, and he who least resembles a bird of prey, who is rather its opposite, a lamb,—should he not be good?" then there is nothing to carp with in this ideal's establishment, though the birds of prey may regard it a little mockingly, and maybe say to themselves, "We bear no grudge against them, these good lambs, we even love them: nothing is tastier than a tender lamb."
—Friedrich Nietzsche, On the Genealogy of Morality

Ressentiment is a reassignment of the pain that accompanies a sense of one's own inferiority/failure on to an external scapegoat. The ego creates the illusion of an enemy, a cause that can be "blamed" for one's own inferiority/failure. Thus, one was thwarted not by a failure in oneself, but rather by an external "evil."

According to Kierkegaard, ressentiment occurs in a "reflective, passionless age", in which the populace stifles creativity and passion in passionate individuals. Kierkegaard argues that individuals who do not conform to the masses are made scapegoats and objects of ridicule by the masses, in order to maintain status quo and to instill into the masses their own sense of superiority.

Ressentiment comes from reactiveness: the weaker someone is, the less their capability to suppress reaction. According to Nietzsche, the more a person is active, strong-willed, and dynamic, the less place and time is left for contemplating all that is done to them, and their reactions (like imagining they are actually better) become less compulsive. The reaction of a strong-willed person (a "wild beast"), when it happens, is ideally a short action: it is not a prolonged filling of their intellect.

Another aspect according to a discussion by Stephen Mulhall, Keith Ansell-Pearson and Fiona Hughes is that after the weaker (slave) side has won out over the stronger, there is in ressentiment a general sense of disappointment that the rewards of victory are much less than was expected by the slaves. The former long-time past resentment at being a slave is perhaps increased by an inadequate outcome, leading to further ressentiment.

=== Max Scheler ===
Max Scheler attempted to place Nietzsche's ideas in a more sociologically articulated context. He started by considering how values are established within society and next proceeded to analyze their sharing or rejection on various grounds. Recently, psychoanalytic literature has begun to acknowledge ressentiment as a clinical phenomenon, using elements of Scheler's analysis, especially his value theory and sociological approaches, to articulate the phenomenon.

=== Weber ===
Max Weber in The Sociology of Religion relates ressentiment to Judaism, an ethical salvation religion of a "pariah people." Weber defines ressentiment as "a concomitant of that particular religious ethic of the disprivileged which, in the sense expounded by Nietzsche and in direct inversion of the ancient belief, teaches that the unequal distribution of mundane goods is caused by the sinfulness and the illegality of the privileged, and that sooner or later God's wrath will overtake them."

=== Deleuze ===
Gilles Deleuze significantly develops the concept of ressentiment as discussed by Nietzsche in his work Nietzsche and Philosophy. According to Deleuze, ressentiment is a reactive state of being that separates us from what we can do and reduces our power to act. He follows Nietzsche's view that the challenge for both philosophy and life is to overcome the reactive state of things and become active, thereby constantly enhancing our power to act.

=== Girard ===
René Girard differs from Nietzsche by assessing that ressentiment is a left-over of not pursuing the mimetic rival or the scapegoat. It is the price paid for turning the other cheek. Atonement could be achieved only by moving beyond rivalry and ressentiment.

== See also ==
- Helmut Schoeck
- Peter Sloterdijk
- Psychological projection
- Scapegoating
