= Master–slave morality =

Central theme of Friedrich Nietzsche's works

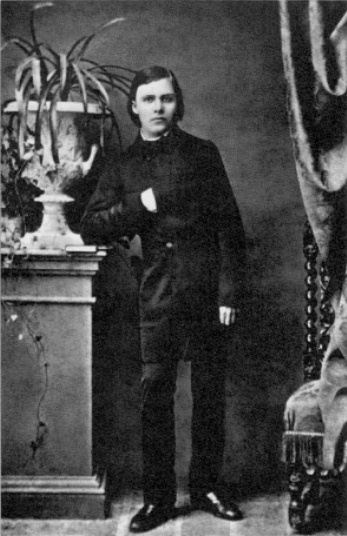
Friedrich Nietzsche, 1861

Master–slave morality (German: Herren- und Sklavenmoral) is a central theme of Friedrich Nietzsche's works, particularly in the first essay of his book On the Genealogy of Morality.

Nietzsche argues that there are two fundamental types of morality: "master morality" and "slave morality", which correspond, respectively, to the dichotomies of "good/bad" and "good/evil". In master morality, "good" is a self-designation of the aristocratic classes; it is synonymous with nobility and everything powerful and life-affirming. "Bad" has no condemnatory implication, merely referring to the "common" or the "low" and the qualities and values associated with them, in contradistinction to the warrior ethos of the ruling nobility. In slave morality, the meaning of "good" is made the antithesis of the original aristocratic "good", which itself is relabeled "evil". This inversion of values develops out of the ressentiment the weak feel toward the powerful.

For Nietzsche, a morality is inseparable from the culture that values it, meaning that each culture's language, codes, practices, narratives, and institutions are informed by the struggle between these two moral structures.

== Master morality ==
Nietzsche defined master morality as the morality of the dominant, aristocratic warrior-rulers, especially in ancient societies. He criticizes the view (which he identifies with contemporary British ideology) that good is everything that is helpful, and bad is everything that is harmful. He writes that in the prehistoric state "the value or non-value of an action was derived from its consequences" but that ultimately "[t]here are no moral phenomena at all, only moral interpretations of phenomena." According to Nietzsche, in its original meaning, good meant noble, strong, and powerful, while the "bad" is the weak, cowardly, timid, and petty.

For Nietzsche, the essence of master morality is nobility, that is, the qualities typical of and suitable to the dominant warrior-aristocrats. Other qualities that are often valued in master morality are open-mindedness, courage, truthfulness, trustworthiness, and an accurate sense of one's self-worth. Master morality begins in the "noble man", with a spontaneous idea of the good; then the idea of bad develops as what is not good. "The noble type of man experiences itself as determining values; it does not need approval; it judges, 'what is harmful to me is harmful in itself', it knows itself to be that which first accords honour to things; it is value-creating." In other words, the masters value as inherently good all those qualities which, when possessed by them, increase their power or feeling of power, and as bad all those qualities which, if possessed by them, would reduce their power. The nobles define the good based on whether the existence of that quality within them helps the further development of his personal excellence.

In short, master morality identifies "good" with "powerful", to the point that even enemies were considered "good" if they were powerful (and a noble man knows he needs enemies and rivals in order to become stronger). For instance, Nietzsche argues that in the Iliad, both the Trojan heroes and the Greek heroes considered each other as "good", even though they were fighting on opposite sides.

While the nobles did feel there existed mutual obligations among peers (fellow aristocrats), they did not have a concept of "evil" per se: if one of their own acted outside that boundary, they were perceived to be mad (possibly a madness caused by the gods, as is often the case in the Greek mythos), rather than worthy of moral blame: the other members could imprison or kill him as a matter of self-preservation, but was not held responsible for his action.

== Slave morality ==
According to Nietzsche, masters create morality; slaves respond to master morality with their slave morality. Unlike master morality, which is sentiment, slave morality is based on ressentiment—devaluing what the master values and what the slave does not have. As master morality originates in the strong, slave morality originates in the weak. Because slave morality is a reaction to oppression, it vilifies its oppressors. Slave morality is the inverse of master morality. As such, it is characterized by pessimism and cynicism. Slave morality is created in opposition to what master morality values as good; it starts by defining everything the master values as "evil" and defines "good" as the lack of "evil".

Slave morality does not aim at exerting one's will by strength, but by careful subversion (ultimately leading to the transvaluation of all ancient values which Nietzsche identified with the Judeo-Christian religion). It does not seek to transcend the masters, but to make them slaves as well. Nietzsche sees this as a contradiction. Since the rich, famous and powerful are few compared to the masses of the poor and weak, the weak gain power by corrupting the strong into believing that the causes of slavery are evil, as are the qualities the weak originally could not choose because of their weakness. By saying humility is voluntary, slave morality avoids admitting that their humility was in the beginning forced upon them by a master. Biblical principles of humility and pity are the result of universalizing the plight of the slave onto all humankind, and thus enslaving the masters as well. "The democratic movement is the heir to Christianity"—the political manifestation of slave morality because of its obsession with freedom and equality.

Unlike master morality, they see evil as deliberately chosen, employing the concept of free will (which Nietzsche denies) so as to assign them moral blame. Nietzsche sees the concepts of heaven and hell as tied to slave morality, claiming that slaves, unable to satisfy their thirst for revenge in their real world, engage in a revenge fantasy, imagining an afterlife in which the “good people” (the slaves) will be rewarded, while the “evil people” (the masters) will be punished.

In Beyond Good and Evil, Nietzsche claims that the essence of slave morality is utility: kindness was seen by the slaves as good in themselves, since it helped reduce their suffering, whereas for the masters such qualities were seen as wholly neutral, since the true mark of whether someone was "good" (worthy of praise) was their degree of wealth, fame and power, not how kind they were. In later works, such as the Genealogy of Morality and The Antichrist, he does not refer anymore to utility in relation to slave morality (which he also refers to as "Tschandala-morality" and "ressentiment morality"), describing it simply as that type of morality which sees the harmless man as the ideal man (as opposed to Master Morality which sees the powerful man as the ideal man).

== Historical context ==
According to Nietzsche, the struggle between master and slave moralities recurs historically. He noted that ancient Greek and Roman societies were grounded in master morality. The Homeric hero is the strong-willed man, and the classical roots of the Iliad and Odyssey exemplified Nietzsche's master morality. He calls the heroes "men of a noble culture", giving a substantive example of master morality. Historically, master morality was defeated, as Christianity's slave morality spread throughout the Roman Empire.

After the destruction of the Second Temple in Jerusalem in 70 AD, Judea completely lost its independence to Rome, and after the defeat of the Bar-Kokhba revolt in 136 AD it ceased to exist as a national state of Jewish people. The struggle between the polytheistic culture of Rome (master, strong) and newly developed Christian monotheism in former Judea and surrounding territories in the Middle East (slave, weak) lasted continuously until 323, when Christianity became the Roman Empire's official religion. Nietzsche condemns the triumph of slave morality in the West, saying that the democratic movement is the "collective degeneration of man". He claims that the nascent democratic movement of his time was essentially slavish and weak. Weakness conquered strength, slave conquered master, re-sentiment conquered sentiment. This ressentiment Nietzsche calls "priestly vindictiveness", based on the jealous weak seeking to enslave the strong and thus erode the basis for power by pulling the powerful down. Such movements were, according to Nietzsche, inspired by "the most intelligent revenge" of the weak.

...the Jews achieved that miracle of inversion of values thanks to which life on earth has for a couple millennia acquired a new and dangerous fascination - their prophets fused "rich", "godless", "evil", "violent", "sensual" into one, and were the first to coin the word "world" as a term of infamy. It is this inversion of values (with which is involved the employment of the word for "poor" as a synonym for "holy" and "friend") that the significance of the Jewish people resides: With them, there begins the slave revolt in morals.

== See also ==
- Apollonian–Dionysian dichotomy
- Master–slave dialectic
- The Marriage of Heaven and Hell

== Sources ==
- Nietzsche, Friedrich (1967). On The Genealogy of Morals. New York: Vintage Books. ISBN 0-679-72462-1.
- — (1973). Beyond Good and Evil. London: Penguin Books. ISBN 978-0-14-044923-5.
- Solomon, Robert C.; Clancy Martin (2005). Since Socrates: A Concise Sourcebook of Classic Readings. London: Thomson Wadsworth. ISBN 0534633285.
- Nietzsche, Friedrich (2008). On the Genealogy of Morals: A Polemic. By Way of Clarification and Supplement to My Last Book Beyond Good and Evil. Oxford University Press. p. 19. ISBN 978-0-19-953708-2.
