= Fiona Hughes (academic) =

British philosopher

Academic background
- Education: University of Edinburgh; Merton College, Oxford

Fiona Hughes is a British Academic. She is a Senior Lecturer in philosophy and Director of Education for Philosophy at the University of Essex.

Hughes graduated from the University of Edinburgh and Merton College, Oxford. In January 2017, Hughes was on the expert panel for BBC Radio 4's In Our Time on Nietzsche's Genealogy of Morality.

== Selected publications ==
- Glendinning, Simon, ed. (1999), The Edinburgh Encyclopedia of Continental Philosophy, Edinburgh University Press, ISBN 978-0-7486-0990-1
- Hughes, Fiona (2007), Kant's Aesthetic Epistemology: Form and World, Edinburgh University Press, ISBN 978-0-7486-2122-4
- Hughes, Fiona (2010), Kant's Critique of Aesthetic Judgement: A Reader's Guide, Continuum Reader's Guides, London: Continuum, ISBN 978-0-8264-9768-0
