= Transvaluation of values =

Philosophical concept by Nietzsche

The revaluation of all values or transvaluation of all values (German: Umwertung aller Werte) is a concept from the philosophy of Friedrich Nietzsche.

== Meaning ==
The revaluation of all values is the process by which actions and beliefs previously thought to be good and righteous come to be seen as evil and wrong, and vice-versa. Nietzsche believed post-exile Judaism and Christianity were part of a revaluation of values whereby master morality (which identified virtue with the expression of strength, power, action, health and sexuality) was supplanted at all levels of society by slave morality (which instead identified power as evil and weakness as good). In his later works, Nietzsche expresses his interest in spearheading a new revaluation of all values against Judeo-Christian morality and egalitarianism.

== Unfinished book series ==
The Revaluation of All Values was also the title of a four-book series Nietzsche was planning to write, meant to be structured as follows:

- Book I — The Antichrist. An Attempted Criticism of Christianity.
- Book II — The Free Spirit. A Criticism of Philosophy as a Nihilistic Movement.
- Book III — The Immoralist. A Criticism of the most Fatal Kind of Ignorance: Morality.
- Book IV — Dionysus. The Doctrine of Eternal Recurrence.

He only managed to complete the first book of the series before fully losing his sanity in late 1888. The unfinished drafts of the remaining three books, alongside other unrelated notes by him, were published by his sister Elisabeth Förster-Nietzsche under the title The Will to Power.
