= Death cult =

Death cult may refer to:

- Funerary cult, a religious practice centered on veneration of the dead
- Mortuary cult, a ceremonial and religious devotion to dead loved ones by the bereaved
- Destructive cult, an anti-cult movement term for unethical and deceptive cults
- Doomsday cult, a cult that believes in, and may attempt to bring about, an end-of-world prophecy
- The Cult, formerly Death Cult, a British rock band
  - Death Cult (EP), a 1983 EP by Death Cult

== See also ==
- Cult of the dead (disambiguation)
- Southeastern Ceremonial Complex, or Southern Death Cult, the regional stylistic similarity of cultural traits of the Mississippian culture
- Southern Death Cult, a British post-punk/gothic rock band
