= On the Genealogy of Morality =

1887 book by Friedrich Nietzsche

On the Genealogy of Morals
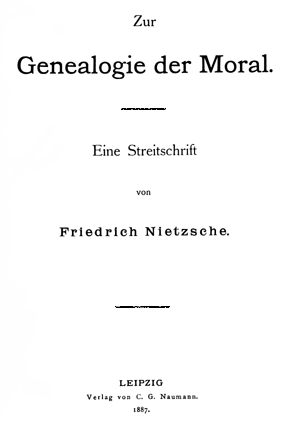
- Title page of the first edition.
- Author: Friedrich Nietzsche
- Original title: Zur Genealogie der Moral
- Subject: Amorality
- Published: 1887
- Publication place: Germany
- Preceded by: Beyond Good and Evil (1886)
- Followed by: The Case of Wagner (1888)

On the Genealogy of Morality: A Polemic (German: Zur Genealogie der Moral: Eine Streitschrift; sometimes translated as On the Genealogy of Morals) is an 1887 book by the German philosopher Friedrich Nietzsche. It consists of a preface and three interrelated treatises ('Abhandlungen' in German) that expand and follow through on concepts that Nietzsche outlined in Beyond Good and Evil (1886). The three treatises trace episodes in the evolution of moral concepts confronting the "moral prejudices" of Christian morality.

Some Nietzschean scholars consider Genealogy to be a work of sustained brilliance and power as well as his masterpiece. Since its publication, it has influenced many authors and philosophers.

== Summary ==
=== Preface ===
Nietzsche's treatise outlines his thoughts "on the origin of our moral prejudices" previously given brief expression in his Human, All Too Human (1878) and Beyond Good and Evil (1886). Nietzsche attributes the desire to publish his "hypotheses" on the origins of morality to reading his friend Paul Rée's book The Origin of the Moral Sensations (1877) and finding the "genealogical hypotheses" offered there unsatisfactory.

Nietzsche decided that "a critique of moral values" was needed, that "the value of these values themselves must be called into question". To this end Nietzsche provides a history of morality, rather than a hypothetical account in the style of Rée, whom Nietzsche classifies as an "English psychologist" (using "English" to designate an intellectual temperament, as distinct from a nationality).

=== First Treatise: "'Good and Evil', 'Good and Bad'" ===
In the "First Treatise", Nietzsche demonstrates that the two pairs of opposites "good/evil" and "good/bad" have very different origins, and that the word "good" itself came to represent two opposed meanings. In the "good/bad" distinction of the aristocratic way of thinking, "good" is synonymous with nobility and everything that is powerful and life-affirming; "bad" has no inculpatory implication and simply refers to the "common" or the "low" and the qualities and values associated with them, in contradistinction to the warrior ethos of the ruling nobility (§3). In the "good/evil" distinction, which Nietzsche calls "slave morality", the meaning of "good" is made the antithesis of the original aristocratic "good", which itself is re-labelled "evil". This inversion of values develops out of the ressentiment felt by the weak towards the powerful.

Nietzsche rebukes the "English psychologists" for lacking historical sense. They seek to do moral genealogy by explaining altruism in terms of the utility of altruistic actions, which is subsequently forgotten as such actions become the norm. But the judgment "good", according to Nietzsche, originates not with the beneficiaries of altruistic actions. Rather, the good themselves (the powerful) coined the term "good". Further, Nietzsche sees it as psychologically absurd that altruism derives from a utility that is forgotten: if it is useful, what is the incentive to forget it? Such meaningless value-judgment gains currency by expectations repeatedly shaping the consciousness.

From the aristocratic mode of valuation, another mode of valuation branches off, which develops into its opposite: the priestly mode. Nietzsche proposes that longstanding confrontation between the priestly caste and the warrior caste fuels this splitting of meaning. The priests, and all those who feel disenfranchised and powerless in a lowly state of subjugation and physical impotence (e.g., slavery), develop a deep and venomous hatred for the powerful. Thus originates what Nietzsche calls the "slave revolt in morality", which, according to him, begins with Judaism (§7), for it is the bridge that led to the slave revolt, via Christian morality, of the alienated, oppressed masses of the Roman Empire (a dominant theme in The Antichrist, written the following year).

To the noble life, justice is immediate, real, and good, necessarily requiring enemies. To slave morality, justice is a deferred event, ultimately taking the form of an imagined revenge that will result in everlasting life for the weak and eternal punishment for the strong. Slave morality grows out of impotence, world-weariness, indignation and envy; it purports to speak for the oppressed masses who have been wronged, deprived of the power to act with immediacy by the masters, who thrive on their subjugation. The men of ressentiment, in an inversion of values, redefine the "good" in their own image. They say: "he is good who does not outrage, who harms nobody, who does not attack, who does not requite, who leaves revenge to God, who avoids evil and desires little from life, like us, the patient, humble, and just."(§13) According to Nietzsche, this is merely a transformation of the effects and qualities of impotence into virtues, as if these effects and qualities were chosen – the meritorious deeds of the "good" man. The deeds of the powerful man, known to themselves as "good", are re-cast by the men of ressentiment as "evil", taking on a mystical moral-judgemental element entirely absent from the aristocratic "bad", which to the noble was simply a descriptor for the inferior qualities of the lower classes.

In the First Treatise, Nietzsche introduces one of his most controversial images, the "blond beast". He had previously employed this expression to represent the lion, an image that is central to his philosophy and made its first appearance in Thus Spoke Zarathustra. Beyond the metaphorical lion, Nietzsche expressively associates the "blond beast" with the Aryan race of Celts and Gaels which he states were all fair skinned and fair-haired and constituted the collective aristocracy of the time. Thus, he associates the "good, noble, pure, as originally a blond person in contrast to dark-skinned, dark-haired native inhabitants" (the embodiment of the "bad"). Here he introduces the concept of the original blond beasts as the "master race" which has lost its dominance over humanity but not necessarily permanently. Though, at the same time, his examples of blond beasts include such peoples as the Japanese and Arabic nobilities of antiquity (§11), suggesting that being a blond beast has more to do with one's morality than one's race. Peter Sloterdijk asserts: "There is no 'eugenics' in Nietzsche."

Nietzsche insists that it is a mistake to hold beasts of prey to be "evil", for their actions stem from their inherent strength, rather than any malicious intent. One can not blame them for their "thirst for enemies and resistances and triumphs" because, according to Nietzsche, there is no "subject" separate from the action:

A quantum of force is equivalent to a quantum of drive, will, effect—more, it is nothing other than precisely this very driving, willing, effecting, and only owing to the seduction of language (and the fundamental errors of reason that are petrified in it) which conceives and misconceives all effects as conditioned by something that causes effects, by a "subject", can it appear otherwise. For just as the popular mind separates the lightning from its flash and takes the latter for an action, for the operation of a subject called lightning, so popular morality also separates strength from expressions of strength, as if there were a neutral substratum behind the strong man, which was free to express strength or not do so. But there is no such substratum; there is no "being" behind doing, effecting, becoming; "the doer" is merely a fiction added to the deed—the deed is everything.(§13)

The "subject" (or soul) is only necessary for slave morality. It enables the impotent man to sanctify the qualities of his impotence by making them into "good" qualities, chosen for moral reasons, and the actions of his oppressor into morally "evil" choices.

Nietzsche concludes his First Treatise by hypothesizing a tremendous historical struggle between the Roman dualism of "good/bad" and that of the Judaic "good/evil", with the latter eventually achieving a victory for ressentiment, broken temporarily by the Renaissance, but then reasserted by the Reformation, and finally confirmed by the French Revolution when the "ressentiment instincts of the rabble" triumphed.

The First Treatise concludes with a note calling for further examination of the history of moral concepts and the hierarchy of values.

=== Second Treatise: "'Guilt', 'Bad Conscience', and Related Matters" ===
==== Memory, the individual, and relations ====
According to Nietzsche, what we call "the conscience" is the end product of a long and painful socio-historical process that began with the need to create a memory in the human animal. For its own psychic health and functionality, the human organism is naturally forgetful. Forgetfulness is "an active and in the strictest sense positive faculty of repression, which is responsible for the fact that what we experience and absorb enters our consciousness as little while we are digesting it (one might call the process 'inpsychation') as does the thousandfold process involved in physical nourishment – so-called incorporation"(§1). But social existence, to the extent that the social organism must function as a unity to survive and prosper, requires that certain things be not forgotten, that individuals must remember their place relative to the whole. Memory in this sense, the social conscience in its rudimentary form, was forged with great difficulty over a long period of time, by what Nietzsche refers to as man's mnemotechnics, the underlying principle of which is "If something is to stay in the memory it must be burned in: only that which never ceases to hurt stays in the memory"(§3).

This long pre-historic process allows a "morality of customs" to establish itself, and through it man becomes calculable, regular, and predictable. Its "ripest fruit" is 'the sovereign individual', a human being whose 'social responsibility' has become flesh and blood, an individual with such hard-won mastery over himself that he is capable of determining and guaranteeing his own future actions. Such an individual has a free will: by virtue of his self-mastery he has the right to make promises. The conscience in this sense is the self-discipline of social responsibility made into a dominating instinct; to such an individual all other individuals, things and circumstances are evaluated from the perspective of this instinct.(§2)

It was in the contractual relationship, a relationship based on mutual promises, that one person first "measured himself against another... setting prices, determining values, contriving equivalences, exchanging – these preoccupied the earliest thinking of man to so great an extent that in a certain sense they constitute thinking as such" (§8). 'Law' and 'justice', a society's codes, judgements and commands in relation to individual and inter-personal rights and obligations, are formed in the context of this contractual-evaluating conceptual paradigm. The strength of one's 'conscience', one's ability to make promises and not break them, to personally guarantee one's future actions, to fulfill one's obligations to others, is thus a vital factor in determining individual social status.

==== Guilt and the creditor–debtor relation ====
The concepts of guilt and punishment likewise have their origins in the contractual relationship. Here 'guilt' (schuld) simply meant 'debt' (schulden): the guilty person was simply the person who was unable to discharge their debt. In punishment, the creditor acquires the right to inflict harm on the guilty person. Such a transaction is made possible, according to Nietzsche, by pleasure in cruelty. Its logic is not related in any way to considerations about the free will, moral accountability etc, of the wrong-doer: it is nothing more than a special form of compensation for the injured party. The creditor receives recompense "in the form of a kind of pleasure—the pleasure of being allowed to vent his power freely upon one who is powerless" (§5). Such punishment was a legally enforceable right of the creditor, and some law books had exact quantifications of what could be done to the debtor's body relative to the debt. It was in this civil law validation of cruelty that 'guilt' first became intertwined with 'suffering'.

==== Punishment and taming ====
In criminal law, punishment and the debtor/creditor relationship have been transferred onto the relation in which the individual stands to the community. The individual enjoys a number of benefits from communal life, the most obvious of which is protection from the hostile world outside the community: a pledge is made to the community and its mores and laws in return for this protection. If that pledge is broken the community, as the offended creditor, demands repayment. A warlike and survival-based community, dealing constantly with danger or scarcity, will be violent and merciless in its treatment of law-breakers. As a community's security and self-confidence increases, the harm of one individual's transgressions decreases correspondingly, and the continuance of the more harmonious state requires that excessively violent responses be controlled and regulated. The nature of such a community's penal law will involve a compromise between this requirement and the angry forces seeking blood and violence. Its principal way of achieving it is to separate the deed from the doer via the concept of 'the crime', a transformation of the actual deed into an abstract legal category implying a 'debt to society', a debt that is ultimately dischargeable through an appropriate 'punishment'.

According to Nietzsche, one must not equate the origin of a thing and its utility. The origin of punishment, for example, is in a procedure that predates the many possible uses and interpretations of it. Punishment has not just one purpose, but a whole range of "meanings" which "finally crystallizes into a kind of unity that is difficult to dissolve, difficult to analyze and ... completely and utterly undefinable" (§13). Nietzsche lists eleven different uses (or "meanings") of punishment, and suggests that there are many more. One utility it does not possess, however, is awakening remorse. The psychology of prisoners shows that punishment "makes hard and cold; it concentrates; it sharpens the feeling of alienation" (§14). The feeling of guilt, the bad conscience, had quite different origins and had no place whatsoever in the institutions of crime and punishment for the greater part of their history. The criminal was dealt with merely as something harmful, as an "irresponsible piece of fate", and the person upon whom punishment was administered, though his body encountered something shocking and violent, was entirely unacquainted with 'moral' pain. The only 'lesson' learned from punishment was that of prudence and memory. Punishment produces "an increase in fear, a heightening of prudence, mastery of the desires: thus punishment tames men, but it does not make them "better"."(§15)

==== Bad conscience and internalization ====
In Nietzsche's theory, the bad conscience was the serious illness that the animal man was bound to contract when he found himself finally enclosed within the walls of a politically organized society. It begins with the institution of the 'state', in its original form a violent subjugation of a people by a highly organized and remorseless military machine: "the wielding of a hitherto unchecked and shapeless populace into a firm form was not only instituted by an act of violence but carried to its conclusion by nothing but acts of violence"(§17). Thus the human animal became subjected, enclosed within a system of externally imposed functions and purposes, and its outward-pressing drives and impulses were turned inward: "the instinct for freedom pushed back and incarcerated within and finally able to discharge and vent itself only on itself".(§16) It is the will to power, the same active force that is at work in the artists of violence and builders of states, but deprived of its object and turned upon itself. This inner world of "self-ravishment" and "artists' cruelty", became "the womb of all ideal and imaginative phenomena", the soul of man.(§18)

==== Ancestor worship and Christianity ====
To understand how the bad conscience became bound up with guilt and punishment, it is necessary to examine how these concepts acquired religious significance. Nietzsche accounts for the genesis of the concept "God" by considering what happens when a tribe becomes ever more powerful. Each successive generation maintains an ethos of indebtedness (guilt) to the original founders of the tribe, the ancestors. The tribe's very existence is thought to depend on a continued acknowledgement and repayment of the ancestor, whose powerful spirit is still present in all customs and daily activities. As the power of the tribe grows, the debt to the ancestor likewise increases. The invisible yet omnipresent figure of the ancestor takes on an ever-increasing power and mystique, until eventually, in the paranoid imaginations of his debtors, he begins to "recede into the darkness of the divinely uncanny and unimaginable: in the end the ancestor must necessarily be transfigured into a god." (§19)

The historical advance toward universal empires brought with it the advance toward monotheistic religions, and it was with Christianity that the feeling of guilty indebtedness achieved its non plus ultra. Christianity is the religion that has sought, successfully, to permanently bind the concept of 'guilt' to the bad conscience:

the aim now is to preclude pessimistically, once and for all, the prospect of a final discharge; the aim now is to make the glance recoil disconsolately from an iron impossibility; the aim now is to turn the concepts "guilt" and "duty" back—back against whom?… against the "debtor" first of all, in whom from now on the bad conscience is firmly rooted, eating into him and spreading within him like a polyp, until at last the irredeemable debt gives rise to the conception of irredeemable penance, the idea that it cannot be discharged ("eternal punishment"). (§21)

The entire condition of mankind becomes guilt-ridden, whether that condition is the primal ancestor who becomes the perpetrator of "original sin", or "nature", the mother, who becomes characterized as evil or shameful, or existence in general, which is now considered "worthless as such". Christianity's expedient, its "stroke of genius" in the shadow of this looming eternal nightmare, was to proclaim that God himself, in the person of Jesus, sacrificed himself for the guilt of mankind. God pays the unpayable debt, the new religion teaches, out of love—love for his debtor. Thus guilt, which originally merely signified debt in a contractual sense, attained an essential moral-metaphysical significance in mankind’s understanding of itself and its relation to God.

==== Self-overcoming ====
Nietzsche ends the Treatise with a positive suggestion for a counter-movement to the "conscience-vivisection and cruelty to the animal-self" imposed by the bad conscience: this is to "wed to bad conscience the unnatural inclinations", i.e. to use the self-destructive tendency encapsulated in bad conscience to attack the symptoms of sickness themselves. It is much too early for the kind of free spirit—a Zarathustra-figure—who could bring this about, although he will come one day: he will emerge only in a time of emboldening conflict, not in the "decaying, self-doubting present" (§24).

=== Third Treatise: "What do ascetic ideals mean?" ===
Nietzsche's purpose in the "Third Treatise" is "to bring to light, not what [the ascetic] ideal has done, but simply what it means; what it indicates; what lies hidden behind it, beneath it, in it; of what it is the provisional, indistinct expression, overlaid with question marks and misunderstandings" (§23).

As Nietzsche tells us in the Preface, the Third Treatise is a commentary on the aphorism prefixed to it:

In other cases the aphoristic form produces difficulty, but this is only because this form is treated too casually. An aphorism properly coined and cast into its final mould is far from being "deciphered" as soon as it has been read; on the contrary, it is then that it first requires to be expounded—of course for that purpose an art of exposition is necessary. The third essay in this book provides an example of what is offered, of what in such cases I call exposition: an aphorism is prefixed to that essay, the essay itself is its commentary. Certainly one quality which nowadays has been best forgotten—and that is why it will take some time yet for my writings to become readable—is essential in order to practise reading as an art—a quality for the exercise of which it is necessary to be a cow, and under no circumstances a modern man!— rumination.

This opening aphorism confronts us with the multiplicity of meanings that the ascetic ideal has for different groups: (a) artists, (b) philosophers, (c) women, (d) physiological casualties, (e) priests, and (f) saints. That the ascetic ideal has been so powerful and meant so many different things is an expression of the basic fact of the human will: "its horror vacui [horror of a vacuum]: it needs a goal—and it will rather will nothingness than not will."

(a) For the artist, the ascetic ideal means "nothing or too many things". Nietzsche selects the composer Richard Wagner as example. Artists, he concludes, always require some ideology to prop themselves up. Wagner, we are told, relied on Schopenhauer to provide this underpinning; therefore we should look to philosophers if we are to get closer to finding out what the ascetic ideal means.

(b) For the philosopher, it means a "sense and instinct for the most favorable conditions of higher spirituality", which is to satisfy his desire for independence. It is only in the guise of the ascetic priest that the philosopher is first able to make his appearance without attracting suspicion of his overweening will to power. As yet, every "true" philosopher has retained the trappings of the ascetic priest; his slogans have been "poverty, chastity, humility."

(e) For the priest, its meaning is the "'supreme' license for power". He sets himself up as the "saviour" of (d) the physiologically deformed, offering them a cure for their exhaustion and listlessness (which is in reality only a therapy which does not tackle the roots of their suffering).

Nietzsche suggests a number of causes for widespread physiological inhibition: (i) the crossing of races; (ii) emigration of a race to an unsuitable environment (e.g. the Indians to India); (iii) the exhaustion of a race (e.g. Parisian pessimism from 1850); (iv) bad diet (e.g. vegetarianism); (v) diseases of various kinds, including malaria and syphilis (e.g. German depression after the Thirty Years' War) (§17).

The ascetic priest has a range of strategies for anesthetizing the continuous, low-level pain of the weak. Four of these are innocent in the sense that they do the patient no further harm: (1) a general deadening of the feeling of life; (2) mechanical activity; (3) "small joys", especially love of one's neighbour; (4) the awakening of the communal feeling of power. He further has a number of strategies which are guilty in the sense that they have the effect of making the sick sicker (although the priest applies them with a good conscience); they work by inducing an "orgy of feeling" (Gefühls-Ausschweifung). He does this by "altering the direction of ressentiment," i.e. telling the weak to look for the causes of their unhappiness in themselves (in "sin"), not in others. Such training in repentance is responsible, according to Nietzsche, for phenomena such as the St Vitus' and St John's dancers of the Middle Ages, witch-hunt hysteria, somnambulism (of which there were eight epidemics between 1564 and 1605), and the delirium characterized by the widespread cry of evviva la morte! ("long live death!").

Given the extraordinary success of the ascetic ideal in imposing itself on our entire culture, what can we look to oppose it? "Where is the counterpart to this closed system of will, goal, and interpretation?" (§23) Nietzsche considers as possible opponents of the ideal: (a) modern science; (b) modern historians; (c) "comedians of the ideal" (§27).

(a) Science is in fact the "most recent and noblest form" of the ascetic ideal. It has no faith in itself, and acts only as a means of self-anesthetization for sufferers (scientists) who do not want to admit they suffer. In apparent opposition to the ascetic ideal, science has succeeded merely in demolishing the ideal's "outworks, sheathing, play of masks, ... its temporary solidification, lignification, dogmatization" (§25). By dismantling church claims to the theological importance of man, scientists substitute their self-contempt [cynicism] as the ideal of science.

(b) Modern historians, in trying to hold up a mirror to ultimate reality, are not only ascetic but highly nihilistic. As deniers of teleology, their "last crowings" are "To what end?," "In vain!," "Nada!" (§26)

(c) An even worse kind of historian is what Nietzsche calls the "contemplatives": self-satisfied armchair hedonists who have arrogated to themselves the praise of contemplation (Nietzsche gives Ernest Renan as an example). Europe is full of such "comedians of the Christian-moral ideal." In a sense, if anyone is inimical to the ideal it is they, because they at least "arouse mistrust" (§27).

The will to truth that is bred by the ascetic ideal has in its turn led to the spread of a truthfulness the pursuit of which has brought the will to truth itself in peril. What is thus now required, Nietzsche concludes, is a critique of the value of truth itself (§24).

== Reception and influence ==
The work has received a multitude of citations and references from subsequent philosophical books as well as literary articles, works of fiction, and the like. On the Genealogy of Morality is considered by many academics to be Nietzsche's most important work, and, despite its polemical content, out of all of his works the one that perhaps comes closest to a systematic and sustained exposition of his ideas. Some of the contents and many symbols and metaphors portrayed in On the Genealogy of Morality, together with its tripartite structure, seem to be based on and influenced by Heinrich Heine's On the History of Religion and Philosophy in Germany.

In philosophy, the genealogical method is a historical technique in which one questions the commonly understood emergence of various philosophical and social beliefs by attempting to account for the scope, breadth or totality of ideology within the time period in question, as opposed to focusing on a singular or dominant ideology. In epistemology, it has been first used by Nietzsche and later by Michel Foucault, who tried to expand and apply the concept of genealogy as a novel method of research in sociology (evinced principally in "histories" of sexuality and punishment). In this aspect Foucault was heavily influenced by Nietzsche.

Others have adapted "genealogy" in a looser sense to inform their work. An example is the attempt by the British philosopher Bernard Williams to vindicate the value of truthfulness using lines of argument derived from genealogy in his book Truth and Truthfulness (2002). Daniel Dennett wrote that On The Genealogy of Morality is "one of the first and still subtlest of the Darwinian investigations of the evolution of ethics". Stephen Greenblatt has said in an interview that On The Genealogy of Morality was the most important influence on his life and work.

== Editions ==
- The Birth of Tragedy & the Genealogy of Morals, translated by Francis Golffing, Anchor Books, 1956, ISBN 0-385-09210-5
- On The Genealogy of Morals and Ecce Homo, translated and edited by Walter Kaufmann (translation of On the Genealogy in collaboration with R. J. Hollingdale), New York: Vintage, 1967; this version also included in Basic Writings of Nietzsche, New York: Modern Library, 2000, ISBN 0-679-72462-1.
- On the Genealogy of Morality, translated by Carol Diethe and edited by Keith Ansell-Pearson, Cambridge: Cambridge University Press, 1994, ISBN 0-521-87123-9.
- On the Genealogy of Morals, translated and edited by Douglas Smith, Oxford: Oxford World's Classics, 1996, ISBN 0-19-283617-X.
- On the Genealogy of Morality, translated and edited by Maudemarie Clark and Alan J. Swensen, Indianapolis: Hackett, 1998, ISBN 0-87220-283-6.
- Jenseits von Gut und Böse. Zur Genealogie der Moral, edited by Giorgio Colli and Mazzino Montinari, Munich: Deutscher Taschenbuch Verlag, 2002.
- The Genealogy of Morals, translated by Horace Barnett Samuel, New York: Courier Dover Publications, 2003, ISBN 0-486-42691-2.
- On the Genealogy of Morals, translated by Michael A. Scarpitti and edited by Robert C. Holub (Penguin Classics) 2013. ISBN 0141195371

== Commentary ==
- Andreas Urs Sommer: Kommentar zu Nietzsches Zur Genealogie der Moral (= Heidelberger Akademie der Wissenschaften (ed.): Historischer und kritischer Kommentar zu Friedrich Nietzsches Werken, vol. 5/2). XVII + 723 pages. Berlin / Boston: Walter de Gruyter 2019 ISBN 978-3-11-029308-1, Ebook ISBN 978-3-11-038892-3 (a comprehensive standard commentary on The Genealogy of Morality, explaining the structure, all contexts, backgrounds and historical sources of the book – only available in German).
- Lise van Boxel, Warspeak: Nietzsche's Victory over Nihilism, Toronto / Chicago: Political Animal Press 2020 ISBN 978-1895131-49-9, Ebook ISBN 978-1895131-50-5 (the comprehensive commentary on The Genealogy of Morality, explaining the meaning of the book by close reading).
