= Tschandala =

Nietzschean philosophical term

Tschandala (old German transcription of chandala) is a term Friedrich Nietzsche borrowed from the Indian caste system, where a chandala is a member of the lowest social class. Nietzsche's interpretation and use of the term relied on a translation of Manusmriti by Max Müller.

== Nietzsche's use of the term ==
Nietzsche uses the term "Tschandala" in the Götzen-Dämmerung (Twilight of the Idols) and Der Antichrist (The Antichrist). Here he uses the "law of Manu" with its caste system as an example of one kind of morality, of "breeding", as opposed to the Christian version of morality which attempts to "tame" man.

At first, Nietzsche describes methods of Christian attempts to "improve" humanity. As a metaphor, he uses a trained beast in a menagerie which is said to be "improved", but which in reality has lost vitality and is only weakened. In just such a way, Nietzsche says, has Christianity "tamed" the Teutonic races.

The law of Manu, on the other hand, tries to organize social groups by creating four castes of people. In his view, the humiliating and oppressive edicts against the Tschandala are a defensive means of keeping the castes pure, though he never makes clear whether he actually supports this system and it has been suggested that he may have been somewhat critical of it.

Yet this organization too found it necessary to be terrible—this time not in the struggle with beasts, but with their counter-concept, the unbred man, the mishmash man, the chandala. And again it had no other means for keeping him from being dangerous, for making him weak, than to make him sick—it was the fight with the "great number."

According to Nietzsche, Christianity is a product of Judaism, the "Tschandala-religion". By this he means that Judaism and Christianity after it are the morality born of the hatred of the oppressed (like the Tschandala) for their oppressors:

Christianity, sprung from Jewish roots and comprehensible only as a growth on this soil, represents the counter-movement to any morality of breeding, of race, privilege:—it is the anti-Aryan religion par excellence. Christianity, the revaluation of all Aryan values, the victory of chandala values, the gospel preached to the poor and base, the general revolt of all the downtrodden, the wretched, the failures, the less favored, against "race": the undying chandala hatred as the religion of love...

By Aryan, he means Indo-Aryan, as he makes clear in his notes.

In The Antichrist, Nietzsche again cites the law of Manu, and favors it in a relative sense to the morality of Judeo-Christianity. Nietzsche describes the "most spiritual" and "strongest" men who can say "yes" to everything, even the existence of the Tschandalas; and opposed to this is the envious and revengeful spirit of the Tschandalas themselves (cf. master–slave morality). Nietzsche also uses the term Tschandala for some of his opponents, e.g. socialism.

== Literary influence ==
Inspired by Nietzsche, August Strindberg wrote a novel called Tschandala in 1889.
