= Röcken =

- Stadtteil of Lützen
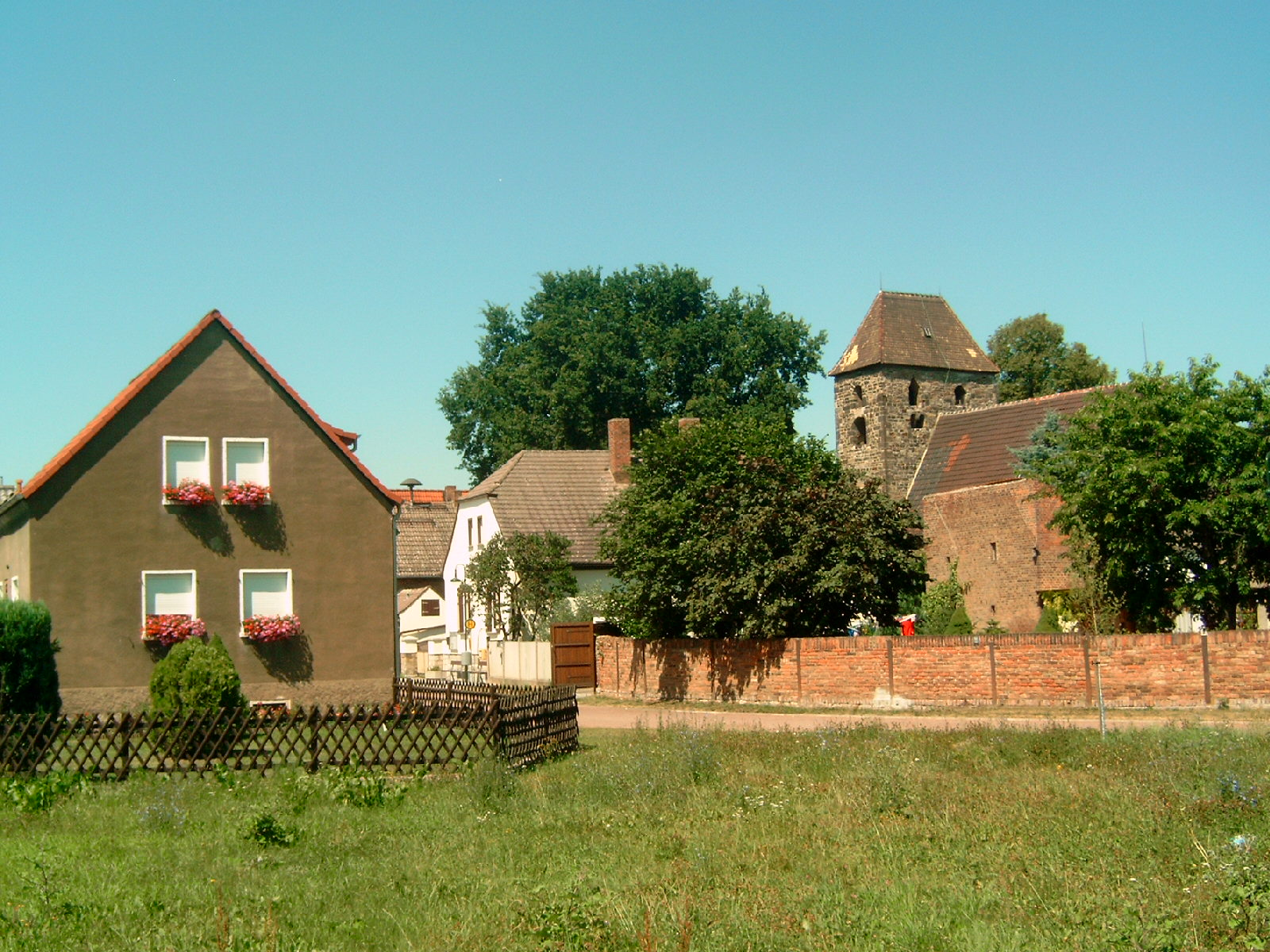
- Interactive map of Röcken
- Location within Germany Location within Saxony-Anhalt
- Coordinates: 51°14′27″N 12°6′58″E
- Country: Germany
- State: Saxony-Anhalt
- District: Burgenlandkreis
- Town: Lützen

Area
  - Total: 11.80 km^{2} (4.56 sq mi)
- Elevation: 122 m (400 ft)

Population (2006-12-31)
  - Total: 610
  - Density: 52/km^{2} (130/sq mi)
- Time zone: UTC+01:00 (CET)
  - Summer (DST): UTC+02:00 (CEST)
- Postal codes: 06686
- Dialling codes: 034444
- Vehicle registration: BLK

Röcken (German pronunciation: [ˈʁœkn̩]) is a village and former municipality in the Burgenlandkreis district, in Saxony-Anhalt, Germany. Since 1 July 2009, it has been part of the town of Lützen. The village is best known as the birthplace, in 1844, of philosopher Friedrich Nietzsche. The house where he was born still stands today. Nietzsche is also buried in the town. Friedrich's father Carl Ludwig Nietzsche was the pastor here and is also buried in the village.

In 2006 the Mitteldeutsche Braunkohlengesellschaft mining company disclosed plans to demolish the village to mine for coal, but their plan met with opposition from the "Coalition for Action" with the motto "future instead of lignite". In a public hearing, 64% of the residents voted against drilling on community-owned land. In April 2008, the plans were officially dropped.

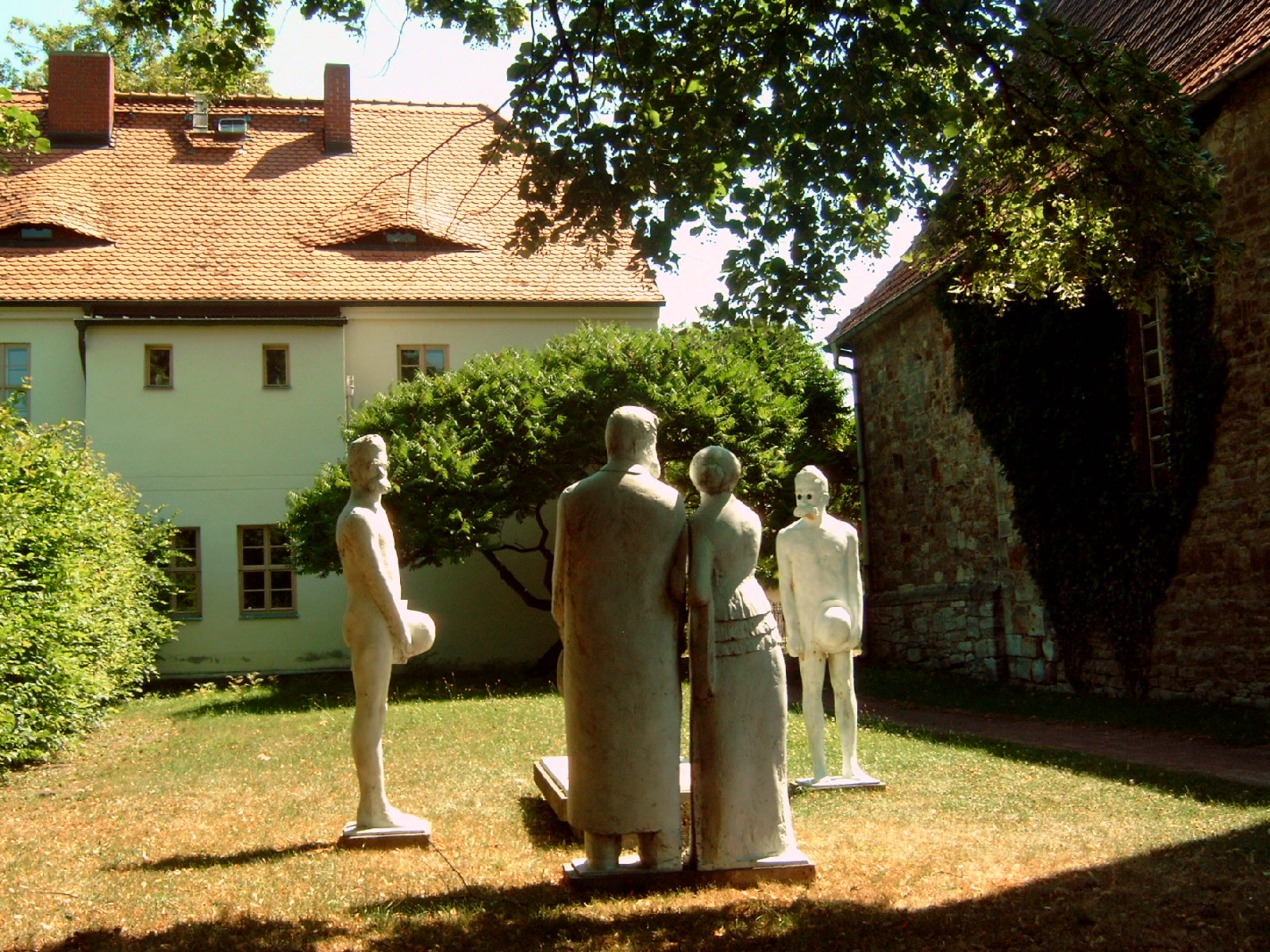
Monument in the garden of Nietzsche's childhood home

== Historical population ==
from 1995 as of 31 December:

Year	Population
1990	665 *
1995	618
2000	617
2005	611
2006	610

* 3 October

== Notable people ==
- Friedrich Nietzsche - philosopher
