= Surlej =

Swiss village

Coordinates: 46°27′N 9°48′E

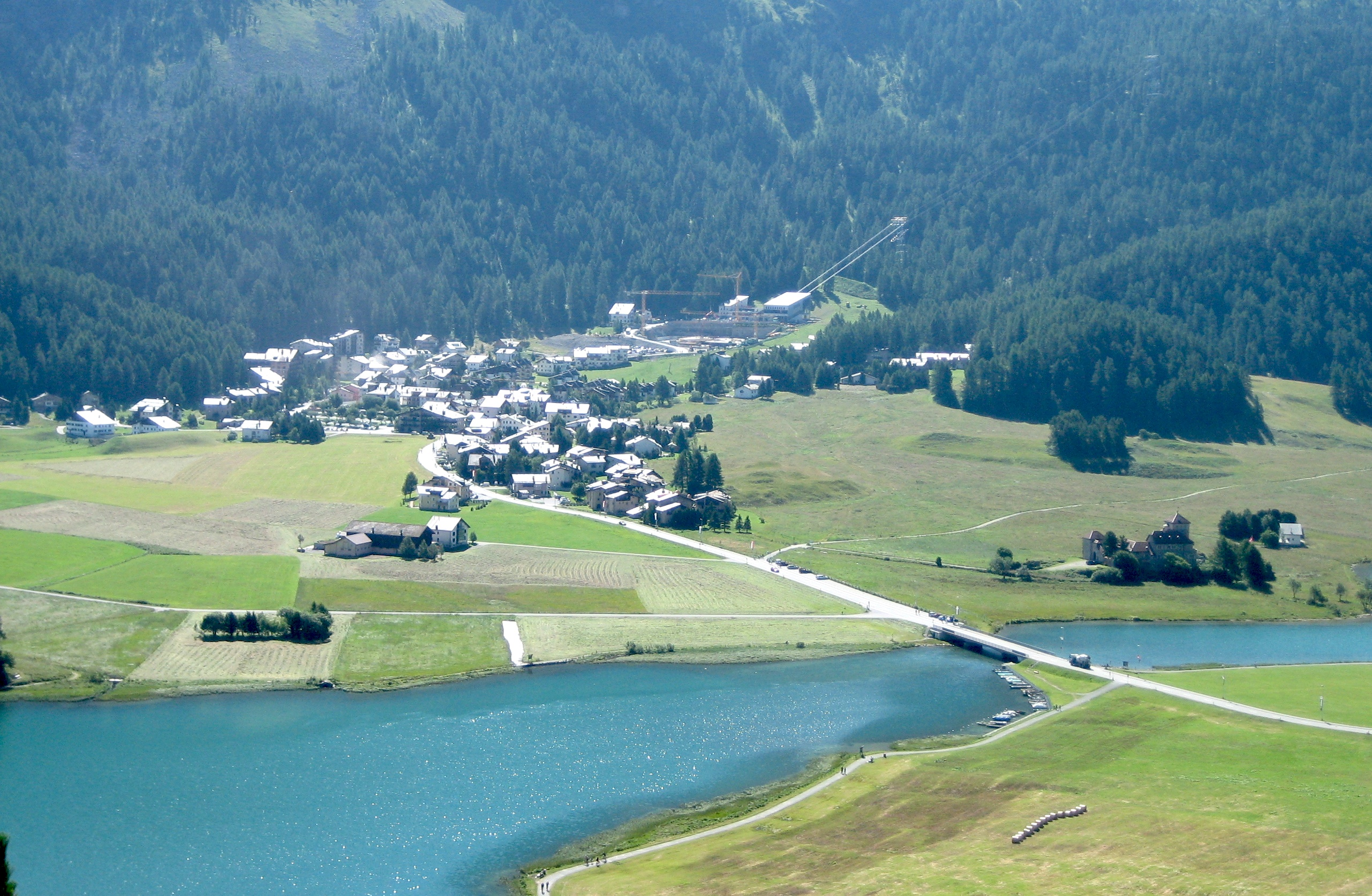
Surlej (Silvaplana)

Surlej is a village in Graubünden, Switzerland. It is located close to Sankt Moritz and Silvaplana.

The town is known for having had Friedrich Nietzsche among its visitors; the philosopher spent every summer from 1883 to 1888 there. He often sat on a stone on the shore of Lake Silvaplana, where he came up with the idea of eternal recurrence, one of the key concepts of his major poetic work "Thus Spoke Zarathustra".
