= Friedrich Nietzsche =

German philosopher (1844–1900)

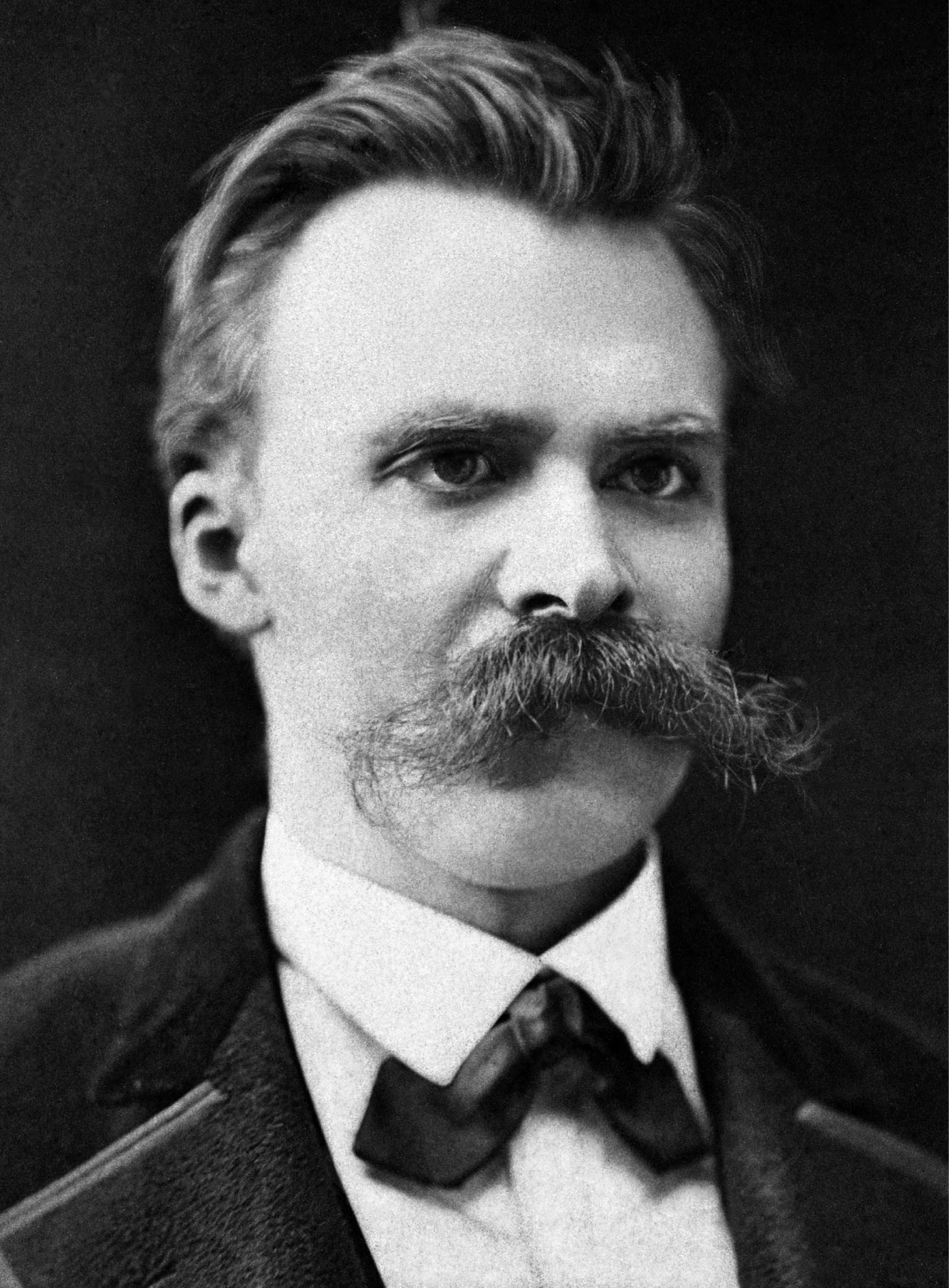
- Nietzsche, c. 1875
- Born: Friedrich Wilhelm Nietzsche; 15 October 1844; Röcken, Saxony, Prussia
- Died: 25 August 1900 (aged 55); Weimar, Grand Duchy of Saxe-Weimar-Eisenach, Germany
- Resting place: Röcken Churchyard

Education
- Education: Schulpforta; University of Bonn; Leipzig University
- Academic advisor: F. W. Ritschl

Philosophical work
- Era: 19th-century philosophy
- Region: Western philosophy
- School: Continental philosophy; Nietzscheanism; Other schools: Anti-foundationalism; Anti-nihilism (disputed) (Note: See, for example: "Some interpreters of Nietzsche believe he embraced nihilism, rejected philosophical reasoning, and promoted a literary exploration of the human condition, while not being concerned with gaining truth and knowledge in the traditional sense of those terms. However, other interpreters of Nietzsche say that in attempting to counteract the predicted rise of nihilism, he was engaged in a positive program to reaffirm life, and so he called for a radical, naturalistic rethinking of the nature of human existence, knowledge, and morality."; "Nietzsche's increasing determination, however, in his later writings, to avoid philosophical nihilisms of every variety, leads him to wonder whether it might not be possible to achieve an understanding of what fuels the foregoing dialectic of a sort that would allow one to head in an altogether different philosophical direction."); Dionysian pessimism; Existentialism; German Romanticism (disputed); Immoralism; Individualism; Naturalism; Perspectivism; Philosophical realism; Political realism
- Institutions: University of Basel
- Main interests: Aesthetics; philology; ethics; literature; ontology; philosophy of history; poetry; psychology; music; tragedy; truth theory; value theory
- Notable ideas: Amor fati; Apollonian and Dionysian; Eternal return; Fact–value distinction; Genealogy; God is dead; Herd instinct; Last man; Master–slave morality; Nietzschean affirmation; Nihilism; Perspectivism; Ressentiment; Transvaluation of values; Tschandala; Übermensch

Friedrich Wilhelm Nietzsche (Note: /ˈniːtʃə, ˈniːtʃi/ NEE-chuh, NEE-chee; German: [ˈfʁiːdʁɪç ˈvɪlhɛlm ˈniːtʃə] or [ˈniːtsʃə].) (15 October 1844 – 25 August 1900) was a German philosopher and writer who started his career as a classical philologist and turned to philosophy early in his academic career. In 1869, at age 24, he was appointed Professor of Classical Philology at the University of Basel. Plagued by health problems for most of his life, he resigned from the university in 1879. He afterward lived as an independent writer, spending much of his life in relative solitude and financial insecurity while moving between Switzerland, Italy, and southern France in search of climates that might alleviate his condition, and in the following decade, he completed much of his core writing. In 1889, aged 44, he suffered a neurological collapse, and thereafter a complete loss of his mental faculties, with paralysis and vascular dementia; (Note: Following a mental breakdown in January 1889, and two strokes in the following year, Nietzsche was initially diagnosed with tertiary syphilis, in accordance with a prevailing medical paradigm of the time. During the first two years of his 11 battling paralysis and vascular dementia, Nietzsche, albeit suffering from expansive delusion, was still able to write letters, often signing as Dionysus.) he lived out his remaining 11 years, first under the care of his mother, and later his sister, until his death. His works and his philosophy have fostered not only extensive scholarship but also much popular interest.

Nietzsche's work encompasses poetry, cultural criticism, and philosophical essays while displaying a fondness for aphorisms and irony. Prominent elements of his philosophy include his critique of objective truth in favour of perspectivism; a genealogical critique of Christian morality and a related theory of master–slave morality; the affirmation of life in response to both the weakening of religion ("God is dead") and the crisis of passive nihilism which followed it; the notion of Apollonian and Dionysian duality; and a characterisation of the human subject as the expression of competing wills, collectively understood as the will-to-power. His later work developed influential concepts such as the Übermensch, the transvaluation of values, and his unique formulation of eternal return. His body of work touched a wide range of topics, including aesthetics, philology, history, music, religion, tragedy, culture and science, and drew inspiration from such diverse sources as Greek tragedy, Arthur Schopenhauer, Ralph Waldo Emerson, and Richard Wagner.

After Nietzsche's death, his sister, Elisabeth Förster-Nietzsche, became the curator and editor of his manuscripts. She edited his unpublished writings to fit her German ultranationalist ideology, often contradicting or obfuscating Nietzsche's stated opinions, which were explicitly opposed to antisemitism and nationalism. Through her published editions, Nietzsche's work became associated with fascism and Nazism. Twentieth-century scholars such as Walter Kaufmann, R. J. Hollingdale and Georges Bataille defended Nietzsche against this interpretation, and corrected editions of his writings were soon made available. His works enjoyed renewed popularity in the 1960s and his ideas have since had a widespread impact on 20th- and 21st-century thinkers across philosophy—especially in schools of continental philosophy such as existentialism, postmodernism and post-structuralism—as well as art, literature, music, poetry, politics and popular culture.

== Biography ==
=== Youth (1844–1868) ===
Born on 15 October 1844, Nietzsche grew up in the town of Röcken (now part of Lützen), near Leipzig, in the Prussian Province of Saxony. He was named after King Friedrich Wilhelm IV of Prussia, who turned 49 on the day of Nietzsche's birth (Nietzsche later dropped his middle name, Wilhelm). Nietzsche's great-grandfather, Gotthelf Engelbert Nietzsche (1714–1804), was an inspector and a philosopher. Nietzsche's grandfather, Friedrich August Ludwig Nietzsche (1756–1826), was a theologian. Nietzsche's parents, Carl Ludwig Nietzsche (1813–1849), a Lutheran pastor and former teacher; and Franziska Nietzsche (née Oehler) (1826–1897), married in 1843, the year before Friedrich's birth. They had two other children: a daughter, Elisabeth Förster-Nietzsche, born in 1846; and a second son, Ludwig Joseph, born in 1848. Nietzsche's father died of a brain disease in 1849, after a year of excruciating agony, when the boy was only four years old; Ludwig Joseph died six months later at age two. The family then moved to Naumburg, where they lived with Nietzsche's maternal grandmother and his father's two unmarried sisters. After the death of Nietzsche's grandmother in 1856, the family moved into their own house, now Nietzsche-Haus, a museum, and Nietzsche study centre.

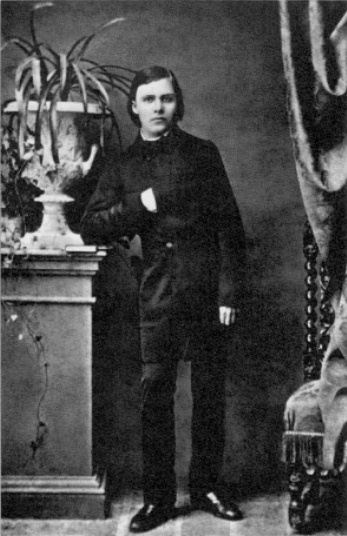
Nietzsche in 1861

Nietzsche attended a boys' school and then a private school, where he became friends with Gustav Krug and Wilhelm Pinder, both of whom came from highly respected families. Academic records from one of the schools attended by Nietzsche noted that he excelled in Christian theology.

In 1854 he began to attend the Gymnasium in Naumburg. Because his father had worked for the state (as a pastor), the now-fatherless Nietzsche was offered a scholarship to study at Schulpforta. That Nietzsche was admitted on the strength of his academic competence has been debunked: his grades were not near the top of the class. He studied there from 1858 to 1864, becoming friends with Paul Deussen and Carl von Gersdorff, who later became a jurist. He also found time to work on poems and musical compositions. Nietzsche led "Germania", a music and literature club, during his summers in Naumburg. At Schulpforta, Nietzsche received an important grounding in languages—Greek, Latin, Hebrew, and French—to be able to read important primary sources; he also experienced for the first time being away from his family life in a small-town conservative environment. His end-of-semester exams in March 1864 showed a 1 in Religion and German; a 2a in Greek and Latin; a 2b in French, History, and Physics; and a "lackluster" 3 in Hebrew and Mathematics.

Nietzsche was an amateur composer. He composed several works for voice, piano, and violin beginning in 1858 at the Schulpforta in Naumburg when he started to work on musical compositions. Richard Wagner was dismissive of Nietzsche's music, allegedly mocking a birthday gift of a piano composition sent by Nietzsche in 1871 to Wagner's wife Cosima. German conductor and pianist Hans von Bülow also described another of Nietzsche's pieces as "the most undelightful and the most anti-musical draft on musical paper that I have faced in a long time".

While at Schulpforta Nietzsche pursued subjects that were considered unbecoming. He became acquainted with the work of the then-almost-unknown poet Friedrich Hölderlin, calling him "my favourite poet" and writing an essay in which he said that the poet raised consciousness to "the most sublime ideality". The teacher who corrected the essay gave it a good mark but commented that Nietzsche should concern himself in the future with healthier, more lucid, and more "German" writers. Additionally, he became acquainted with Ernst Ortlepp, an eccentric, blasphemous, and often drunken poet who was found dead in a ditch weeks after meeting Nietzsche but who may have introduced Nietzsche to the music and writing of Richard Wagner. Perhaps under Ortlepp's influence, he and a student named Richter returned to school drunk and encountered a teacher, resulting in Nietzsche's demotion from first in his class and the end of his status as a prefect.

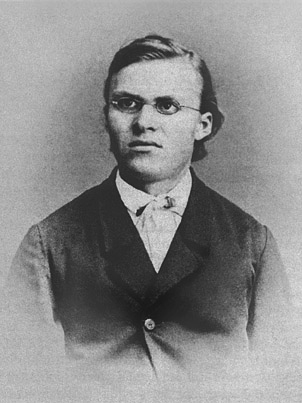
Nietzsche in 1864

After graduation in September 1864, Nietzsche began studying theology and classical philology at the University of Bonn in the hope of becoming a minister. For a short time, he and Deussen became members of the Burschenschaft (student association) Frankonia. After one semester (and to the anger of his mother), he stopped his theological studies and lost his faith. As early as his 1862 essay "Fate and History", Nietzsche argued that historical research had discredited the central teachings of Christianity, but David Strauss's Life of Jesus also seems to have had a profound effect on the young man. In addition, Ludwig Feuerbach's The Essence of Christianity influenced young Nietzsche with its argument that people created God and not the other way around. In June 1865, at the age of 20, Nietzsche wrote to his sister Elisabeth, who was deeply religious, a letter regarding his loss of faith. This letter contains the following statement:

Hence the ways of men part: if you wish to strive for peace of soul and pleasure, then believe; if you wish to be a devotee of truth, then inquire....

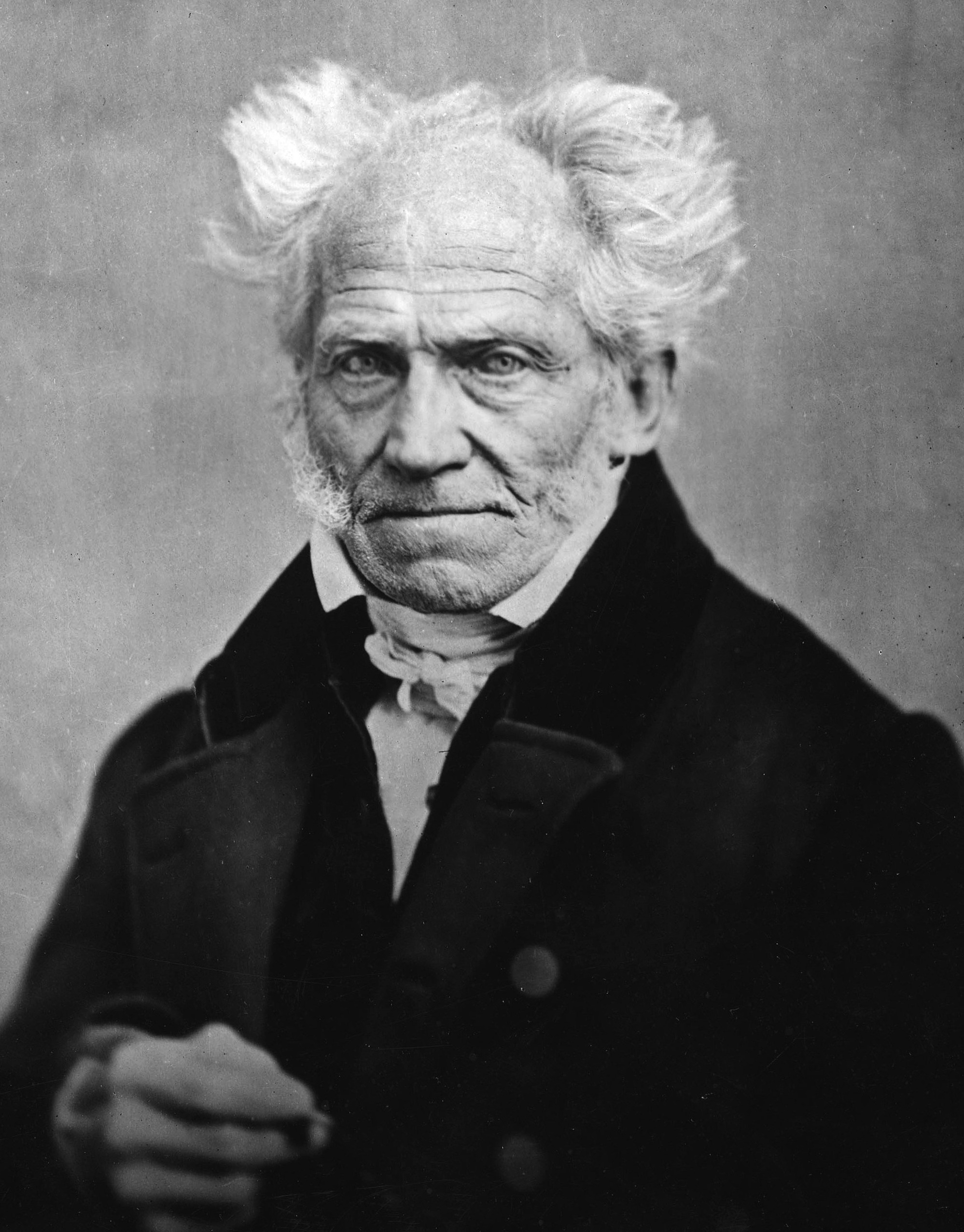
Arthur Schopenhauer strongly influenced Nietzsche's philosophical thought.

Nietzsche subsequently concentrated on studying philology under Professor Friedrich Wilhelm Ritschl, whom he followed to the University of Leipzig in 1865. There, he became close friends with his fellow-student Erwin Rohde. Nietzsche's first philological publications appeared soon after.

In 1865 Nietzsche thoroughly studied the works of Arthur Schopenhauer. He owed the awakening of his philosophical interest to reading Schopenhauer's The World as Will and Representation, later admitting that Schopenhauer was one of the few thinkers whom he respected, dedicating the essay "Schopenhauer as Educator" in the Untimely Meditations to him.

In 1866 he read Friedrich Albert Lange's History of Materialism. Lange's descriptions of Immanuel Kant's anti-materialistic philosophy, the rise of European Materialism, Europe's increased concern with science, Charles Darwin's theory of evolution and the general rebellion against tradition and authority intrigued Nietzsche greatly. Nietzsche would ultimately argue the impossibility of an evolutionary explanation of the human aesthetic sense.

In 1867 Nietzsche signed up for one year of voluntary service with the Prussian artillery division in Naumburg. He was regarded as one of the finest riders among his fellow-recruits, and his officers predicted that he would soon reach the rank of captain. In March 1868, while mounting his horse, Nietzsche struck his chest against the pommel and tore two muscles in his left side, leaving him exhausted and unable to walk for months. Consequently, he turned his attention to his studies again, completing them in 1868. Nietzsche also met Richard Wagner for the first time later that year.

=== Professor at Basel (1869–1879) ===
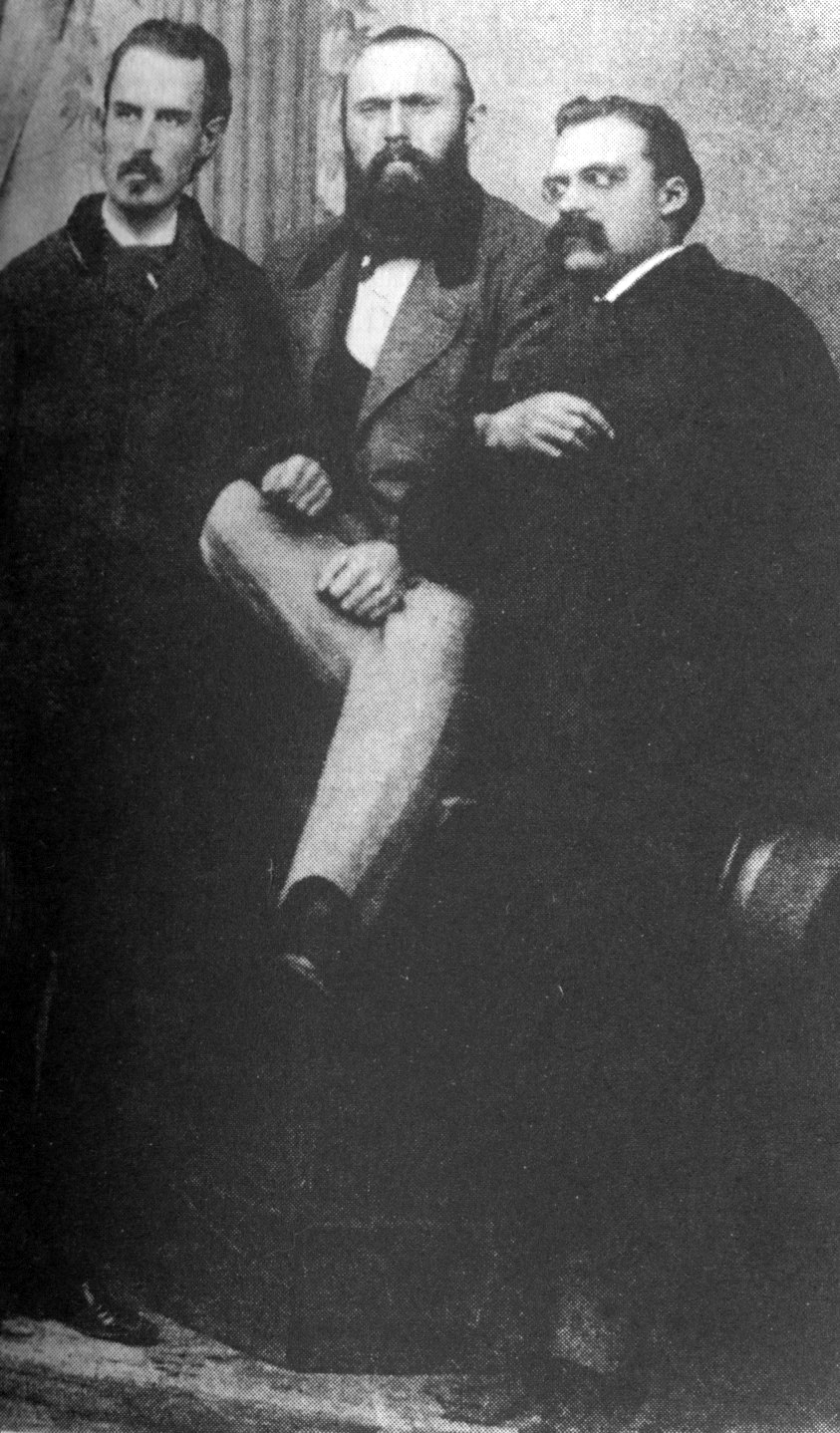
Left to right: Erwin Rohde, Karl von Gersdorff and Nietzsche, October 1871

In 1869, with Ritschl's support, Nietzsche received an offer to become a professor of classical philology at the University of Basel in Switzerland. He was only 24 years old and had neither completed his doctorate nor received a teaching certificate ("habilitation"). He was awarded an honorary doctorate by Leipzig University in March 1869, again with Ritschl's support.

Despite his offer coming at a time when he was considering giving up philology for science, he accepted. To this day, Nietzsche is still among the youngest of the tenured Classics professors on record.

Nietzsche's 1870 projected doctoral thesis, "Contribution toward the Study and the Critique of the Sources of Diogenes Laertius" ("Beiträge zur Quellenkunde und Kritik des Laertius Diogenes"), examined the origins of the ideas of Diogenes Laërtius. Though never submitted, it was later published as a Gratulationsschrift ('congratulatory publication') in Basel. (Note: Between 1868 and 1870, he published two other studies on Diogenes Laertius: On the Sources of Diogenes Laertius (De Fontibus Diogenis Laertii) Part I (1868) & Part II (1869); and Analecta Laertiana (1870). See Jensen & Heit 2014, p. 115)

Before moving to Basel, Nietzsche renounced his Prussian citizenship: for the rest of his life he remained officially stateless.

Nevertheless, Nietzsche served in the Prussian forces during the Franco-Prussian War (1870–1871) as a medical orderly. In his short time in the military, he experienced much and witnessed the traumatic effects of battle. He also contracted diphtheria and dysentery. Walter Kaufmann speculates that he also contracted syphilis at a brothel along with his other infections at this time. On returning to Basel in 1870, Nietzsche observed the establishment of the German Empire and Otto von Bismarck's subsequent policies as an outsider and with a degree of scepticism regarding their genuineness. His inaugural lecture at the university was "Homer and Classical Philology". Nietzsche also met Franz Overbeck, a professor of theology who remained his friend throughout his life, Afrikan Spir, a little-known Russian philosopher responsible for the 1873 Thought and Reality and Nietzsche's colleague, the historian Jacob Burckhardt, whose lectures Nietzsche frequently attended, began to exercise significant influence on him.

Nietzsche had already met Richard Wagner in Leipzig in 1868 and later Wagner's wife, Cosima. Nietzsche admired both greatly and during his time at Basel frequently visited Wagner's house in Tribschen in Lucerne. The Wagners brought Nietzsche into their most intimate circle—which included Franz Liszt, of whom Nietzsche colloquially described: "Liszt or the art of running after women!" Nietzsche enjoyed the attention he gave to the beginning of the Bayreuth Festival. In 1870 he gave Cosima Wagner the manuscript of "The Genesis of the Tragic Idea" as a birthday gift. In 1872 Nietzsche published his first book, The Birth of Tragedy. His colleagues within his field, including Ritschl, expressed little enthusiasm for the work in which Nietzsche eschewed the classical philologic method in favour of a more speculative approach. In his polemic Philology of the Future, Ulrich von Wilamowitz-Moellendorff damped the book's reception and increased its notoriety. In response, Rohde (then a professor in Kiel) and Wagner came to Nietzsche's defence. Nietzsche remarked freely about the isolation he felt within the philological community and attempted unsuccessfully to transfer to a position in philosophy at Basel.

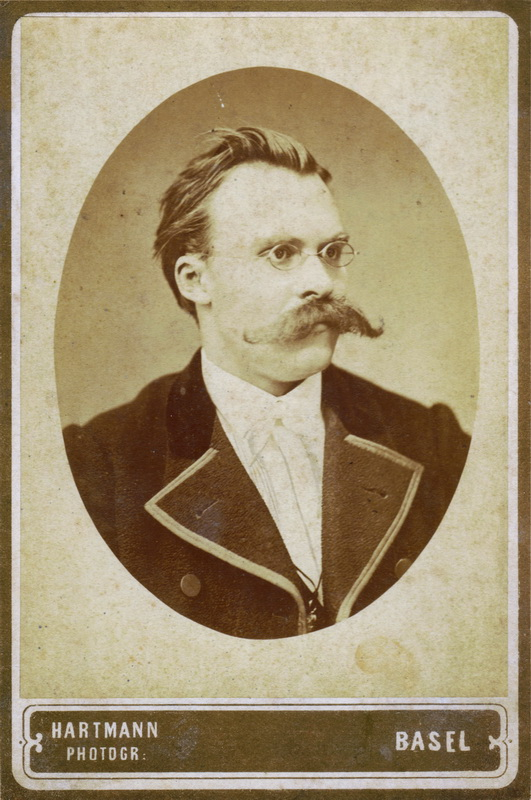
Nietzsche, c. 1872

In 1873 Nietzsche began to accumulate notes that would be posthumously published as Philosophy in the Tragic Age of the Greeks. Between 1873 and 1876, he published four separate long essays: "David Strauss: the Confessor and the Writer", "On the Use and Abuse of History for Life", "Schopenhauer as Educator", and "Richard Wagner in Bayreuth". These four later appeared in a collected edition under the title Untimely Meditations. The essays shared the orientation of a cultural critique, challenging the developing German culture suggested by Schopenhauer and Wagner. During this time in the circle of the Wagners, he met Malwida von Meysenbug and Hans von Bülow. He also began a friendship with Paul Rée who, in 1876, influenced him into dismissing the pessimism in his early writings. He was deeply disappointed by the Bayreuth Festival of 1876, where the banality of the shows and baseness of the public repelled him. He was also alienated by Wagner's championing of "German culture", which Nietzsche felt a contradiction in terms, as well as by Wagner's celebration of his fame among the German public. All this contributed to his subsequent decision to distance himself from Wagner.

With the publication in 1878 of Human, All Too Human (a book of aphorisms ranging from metaphysics to morality to religion), a new style of Nietzsche's work became clear, highly influenced by Afrikan Spir's Thought and Reality and reacting against the pessimistic philosophy of Wagner and Schopenhauer. Nietzsche's friendship with Deussen and Rohde cooled as well. In 1879, after a significant decline in health, Nietzsche had to resign his position at Basel and was pensioned. Beginning in his childhood, various disruptive illnesses had plagued him, including moments of shortsightedness that left him nearly blind, migraine headaches, and violent indigestion. The 1868 riding accident and diseases in 1870 may have aggravated these persistent conditions, which continued to affect him through his years at Basel, forcing him to take longer and longer holidays until regular work became impractical.

=== Independent philosopher (1879–1888) ===
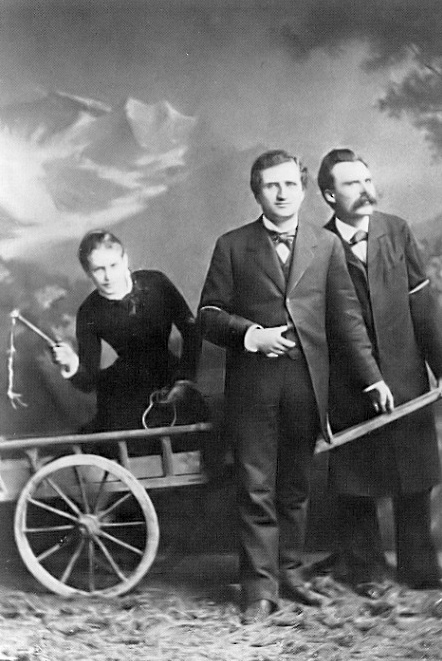
Lou Salomé, Paul Rée and Nietzsche posing for a studio photo during their trip through Italy in 1882, planning to establish an educational commune together, but the friendship disintegrated in late 1882 due to complications from Rée's and Nietzsche's mutual romantic interest in Salomé.

Living on his pension from Basel along with aid from friends, Nietzsche travelled frequently to find climates more conducive to his health. He lived until 1889 as an independent author in different cities. He spent many summers in Sils Maria near St. Moritz in Switzerland, and many of his winters in the Italian cities of Genoa, Rapallo, and Turin, and the French city of Nice. In 1881, when France occupied Tunisia, he planned to travel to Tunis to view Europe from the outside but later abandoned that idea, probably for health reasons. Nietzsche occasionally returned to Naumburg to visit his family, and, especially during this time, he and his sister, Elisabeth, had repeated periods of conflict and reconciliation.

While in Genoa, Nietzsche's failing eyesight prompted him to explore the use of typewriters as a means of continuing to write. He is known to have tried using the Hansen Writing Ball, a contemporary typewriter device. In the end, a past pupil of his, Peter Gast, became a private secretary to Nietzsche. In 1876, Gast transcribed the crabbed, nearly illegible handwriting of Nietzsche's first encounter with Richard Wagner in Bayreuth. He subsequently transcribed and proofread the galleys for almost all of Nietzsche's work. On at least one occasion, on 23 February 1880, the usually poor Gast received 200 Marks from their mutual friend, Paul Rée. Gast was one of the very few friends Nietzsche allowed to criticise him. In responding most enthusiastically to Also Sprach Zarathustra ("Thus Spoke Zarathustra"), Gast did feel it necessary to point out that what were described as "superfluous" people were in fact quite necessary. He went on to list the number of people Epicurus, for example, had to rely on to supply his simple diet of goat cheese.

To the end of his life, Gast and Overbeck remained consistently faithful friends. Malwida von Meysenbug remained like a motherly patron even outside the Wagner circle. Soon Nietzsche made contact with the music-critic Carl Fuchs. Nietzsche stood at the beginning of his most productive period. Beginning with Human, All Too Human in 1878, Nietzsche published one book or major section of a book each year until 1888, his last year of writing; that year, he completed five.

In 1882 Nietzsche published the first part of The Gay Science. That year he also met Lou Andreas-Salomé, through Malwida von Meysenbug and Paul Rée.

Salomé's mother took her to Rome when Salomé was 21. At a literary salon in the city, Salomé became acquainted with Paul Rée. Rée proposed marriage to her, but she, instead, proposed that they should live and study together as "brother and sister", along with another man for company, where they would establish an academic commune. Rée accepted the idea and suggested that they be joined by his friend Nietzsche. The two met Nietzsche in Rome in April 1882, and Nietzsche is believed to have instantly fallen in love with Salomé, as Rée had done. Nietzsche asked Rée to propose marriage to Salomé, which she rejected. She had been interested in Nietzsche as a friend, but not as a husband. Nietzsche nonetheless was content to join with Rée and Salomé touring through Switzerland and Italy together, planning their commune. The three travelled with Salomé's mother through Italy and considered where they would set up their "Winterplan" commune. They intended to set up their commune in an abandoned monastery, but no suitable location was found. On 13 May, in Lucerne, when Nietzsche was alone with Salomé, he earnestly proposed marriage to her again, which she rejected. He nonetheless was happy to continue with the plans for an academic commune. After discovering the relationship, Nietzsche's sister Elisabeth became determined to get Nietzsche away from the "immoral woman". Nietzsche and Salomé spent the summer together in Tautenburg in Thuringia, often with Nietzsche's sister Elisabeth as a chaperone. Salomé reports that he asked her to marry him on three separate occasions and that she refused, though the reliability of her reports of events is questionable. Arriving in Leipzig (Germany) in October, Salomé and Rée separated from Nietzsche after a falling-out between Nietzsche and Salomé, in which Salomé believed that Nietzsche was desperately in love with her.

While the three spent a number of weeks together in Leipzig in October 1882, the following month Rée and Salomé left Nietzsche, leaving for Stibbe (modern-day Zdbowo in Poland) without any plans to meet again. Nietzsche soon fell into a period of mental anguish, although he continued to write to Rée, stating "We shall see one another from time to time, won't we?" In later recriminations, Nietzsche would blame on separate occasions the failure in his attempts to woo Salomé on Salomé, Rée, and on the intrigues of his sister (who had written letters to the families of Salomé and Rée to disrupt the plans for the commune). Nietzsche wrote of the affair in 1883, that he now felt "genuine hatred for my sister".

Amidst renewed bouts of illness, living in near-isolation after a falling out with his mother and sister regarding Salomé, Nietzsche fled to Rapallo, where he wrote the first part of Also Sprach Zarathustra in only ten days.

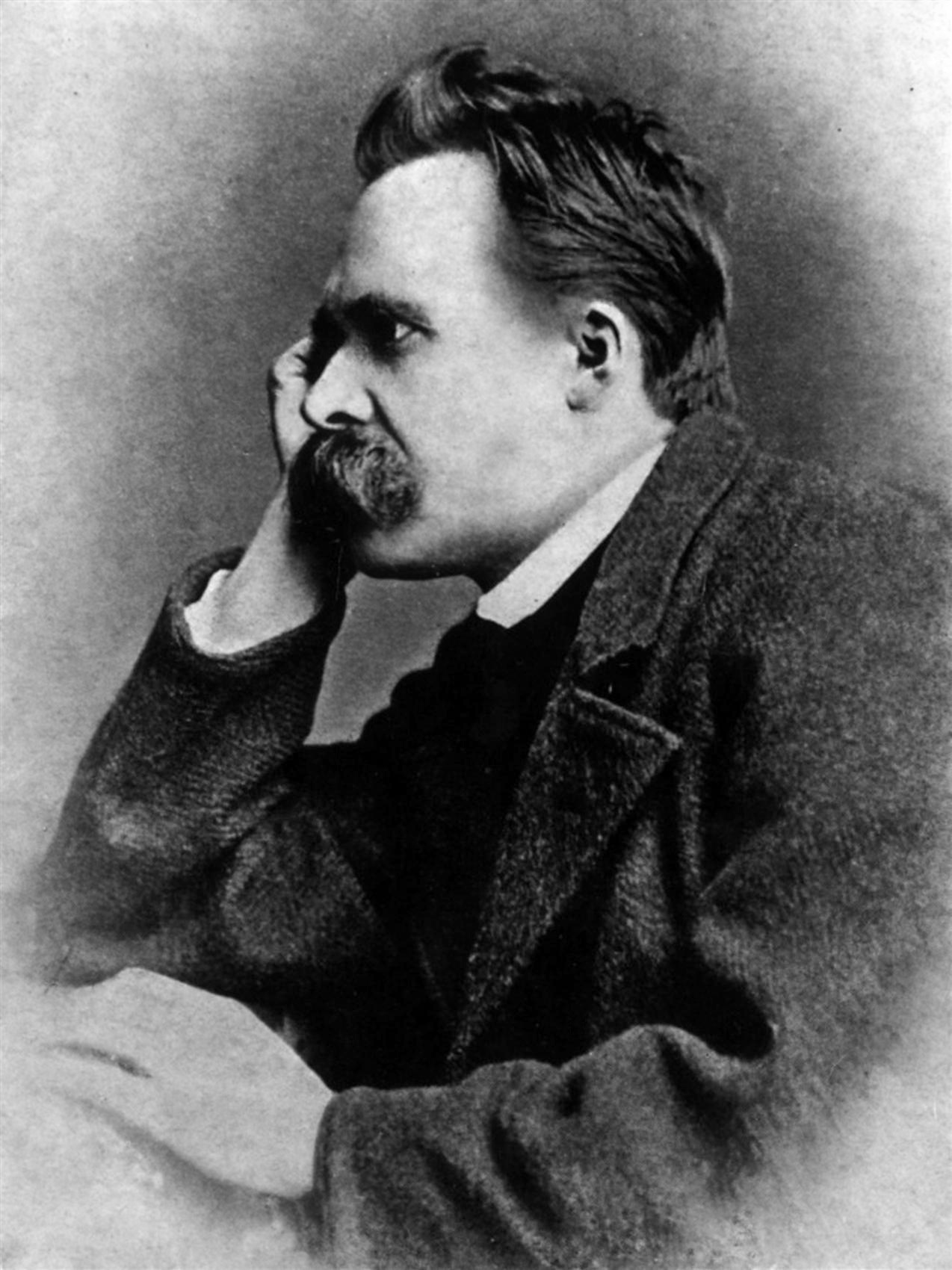
Photo of Nietzsche by Gustav-Adolf Schultze, 1882

He turned away from the influence of Arthur Schopenhauer, and after he severed his social ties with Wagner, Nietzsche had few remaining friends. Now, with the new style of Zarathustra, his work became even more alienating, and the market received it only to the degree required by politeness. Nietzsche recognised this and maintained his solitude, though he often complained. His books remained largely unsold. In 1885, he printed only 40 copies of the fourth part of Zarathustra and distributed a fraction of them among close friends, including Helene von Druskowitz.

In 1883 he tried and failed to obtain a lecturing post at the University of Leipzig. According to a letter he wrote to Peter Gast, this was due to his "attitude towards Christianity and the concept of God".

In 1886 Nietzsche broke with his publisher Ernst Schmeitzner, disgusted by his antisemitic opinions. Nietzsche saw his own writings as "completely buried and in this anti-Semitic dump" of Schmeitzner—associating the publisher with a movement that should be "utterly rejected with cold contempt by every sensible mind". He then printed Beyond Good and Evil at his own expense. He also acquired the publication rights for his earlier works and over the next year issued second editions of The Birth of Tragedy, Human, All Too Human, Daybreak, and of The Gay Science with new prefaces placing the body of his work in a more coherent perspective. Thereafter, he saw his work as completed for a time and hoped that soon a readership would develop. In fact, interest in Nietzsche's thought did increase at this time, if rather slowly and imperceptibly to him. During these years Nietzsche met Meta von Salis, Carl Spitteler and Gottfried Keller.

In 1886 his sister, Elisabeth, married the antisemite Bernhard Förster and travelled to Paraguay to found Nueva Germania, a "Germanic" colony. Through correspondence, Nietzsche's relationship with Elisabeth continued through cycles of conflict and reconciliation, but they met again only after his collapse. He continued to have frequent and painful attacks of illness, which made prolonged work impossible.

In 1887 Nietzsche wrote the polemic On the Genealogy of Morality. During the same year, he encountered the work of Fyodor Dostoevsky, to whom he felt an immediate kinship. He also exchanged letters with Hippolyte Taine and Georg Brandes. Brandes, who had started to teach the philosophy of Søren Kierkegaard in the 1870s, wrote to Nietzsche asking him to read Kierkegaard, to which Nietzsche replied that he would come to Copenhagen and read Kierkegaard with him. Before fulfilling this promise, Nietzsche slipped too far into illness. At the beginning of 1888, Brandes delivered in Copenhagen one of the first lectures on Nietzsche's philosophy.

Although Nietzsche had previously announced at the end of On the Genealogy of Morality a new work with the title The Will to Power: Attempt at a Revaluation of All Values, he seems to have abandoned this idea and, instead, used some of the draft passages to compose Twilight of the Idols and The Antichrist in 1888.

His health improved and he spent the summer in high spirits. In the autumn of 1888, his writings and letters began to reveal a higher estimation of his own status and "fate". He overestimated the increasing response to his writings, especially to the recent polemic, The Case of Wagner. On his 44th birthday, after completing Twilight of the Idols and The Antichrist, he decided to write the autobiography Ecce Homo. In its preface—which suggests Nietzsche was well aware of the interpretive difficulties his work would generate—he declares, "Hear me! For I am such and such a person. Above all, do not mistake me for someone else." In December, Nietzsche began a correspondence with August Strindberg and thought that, short of an international breakthrough, he would attempt to buy back his older writings from the publisher and have them translated into other European languages. Moreover, he planned the publication of the compilation Nietzsche contra Wagner and of the poems that made up his collection Dionysian-Dithyrambs.

=== Mental illness and death (1889–1900) ===
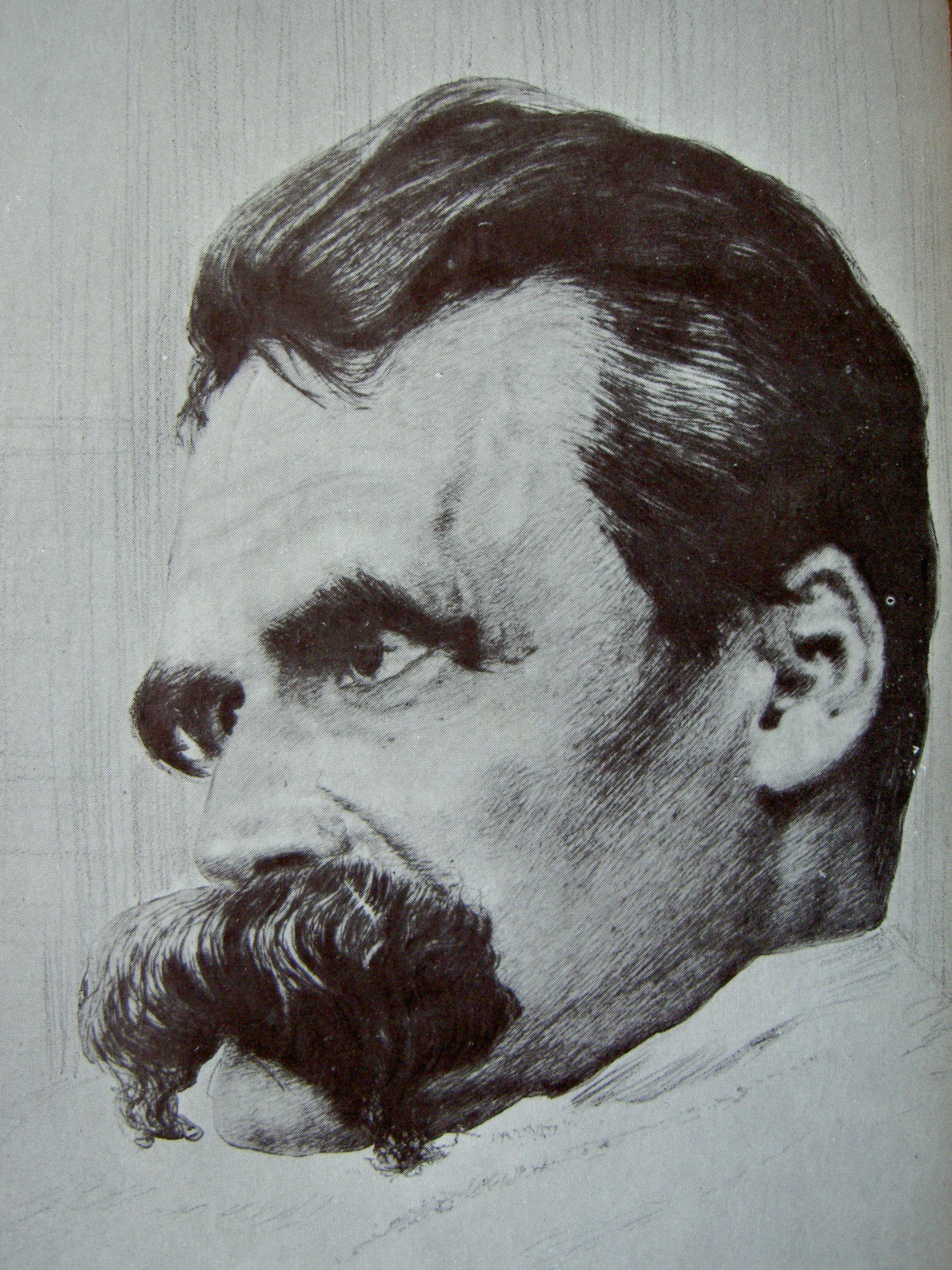
Drawing by Hans Olde from the photographic series The Ill Nietzsche, late 1899

On 3 January 1889, Nietzsche suffered a mental breakdown. Two policemen approached him after he caused a public disturbance in the streets of Turin. What happened remains unknown, but an often-repeated tale from shortly after his death states that Nietzsche witnessed the flogging of a horse at the other end of the Piazza Carlo Alberto, ran to the horse, threw his arms around its neck to protect it and then collapsed to the ground. In the following few days Nietzsche sent short writings—known as the Wahnzettel or Wahnbriefe (literally "Delusion notes" or "letters")—to a number of friends including Cosima Wagner and Jacob Burckhardt. Most of them were signed "Dionysus", though some were also signed "der Gekreuzigte" meaning "the crucified one". To his former colleague Burckhardt, Nietzsche wrote:

I have had Caiaphas put in fetters. Also, last year I was crucified by the German doctors in a very drawn-out manner. Wilhelm, Bismarck, and all anti-Semites abolished.

Additionally, he commanded the German emperor to go to Rome to be shot and summoned the European powers to take military action against Germany, writing also that the pope should be put in jail and that he, Nietzsche, created the world and was in the process of having all antisemites shot dead.

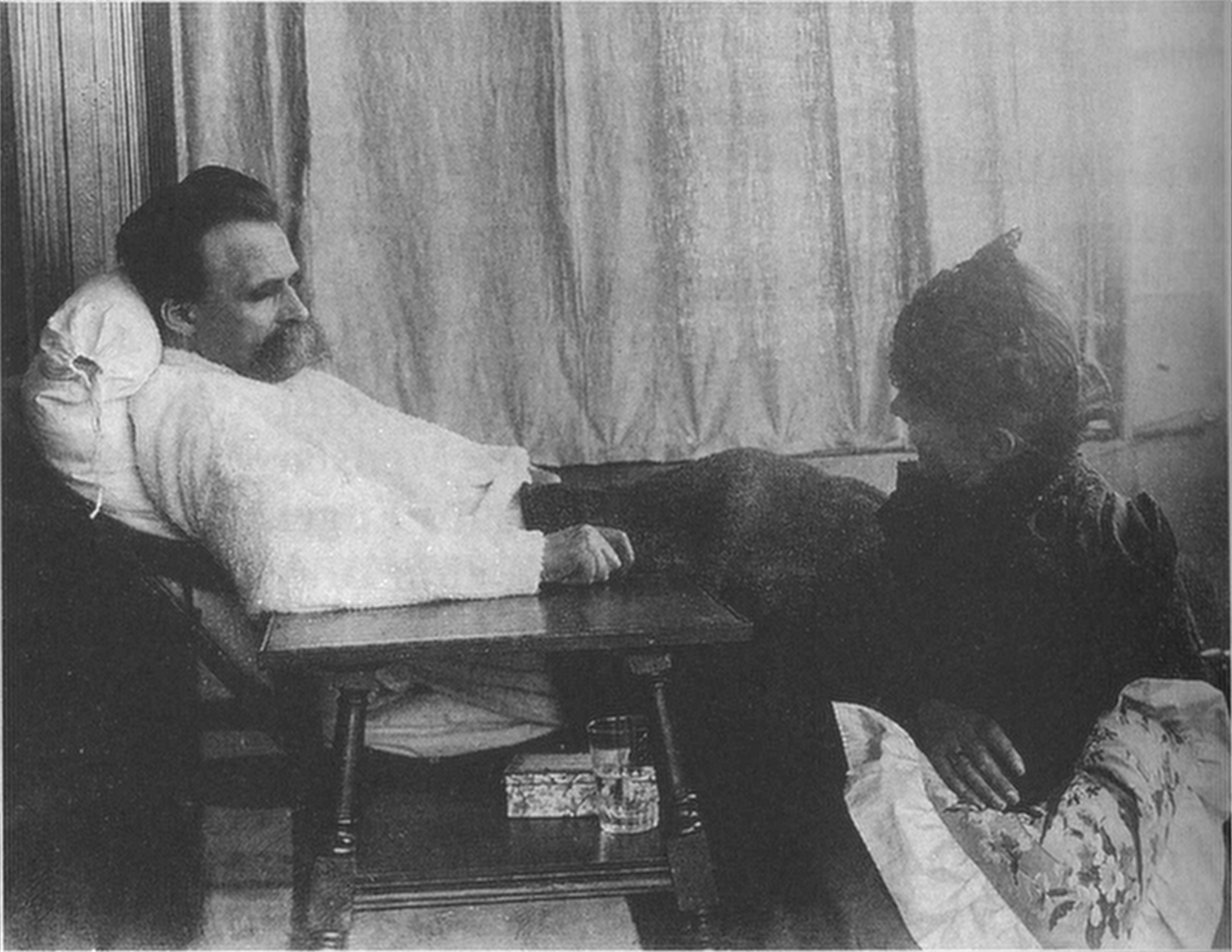
Nietzsche in the care of his sister, 1899

On 6 January 1889 Burckhardt showed the letter he had received from Nietzsche to Overbeck. The following day, Overbeck received a similar letter and decided that Nietzsche's friends had to bring him back to Basel. Overbeck travelled to Turin and brought Nietzsche to a psychiatric clinic in Basel. By that time Nietzsche appeared fully in the grip of a serious mental illness, and his mother Franziska decided to transfer him to a clinic in Jena under the direction of Otto Binswanger. In January 1889, they proceeded with the planned release of Twilight of the Idols, by that time already printed and bound. From November 1889 to February 1890, the art historian Julius Langbehn attempted to cure Nietzsche, claiming that the methods of the medical doctors were ineffective in treating Nietzsche's condition. Langbehn assumed progressively greater control of Nietzsche until his secretiveness discredited him. In March 1890, Franziska removed Nietzsche from the clinic and, in May 1890, brought him to her home in Naumburg. During this process Overbeck and Gast contemplated what to do with Nietzsche's unpublished works. In February they ordered a fifty-copy private edition of Nietzsche contra Wagner, but the publisher C. G. Naumann secretly printed one hundred. Overbeck and Gast decided to withhold publishing The Antichrist and Ecce Homo because of their more radical content. Nietzsche's reception and recognition enjoyed their first surge.

In 1893, Nietzsche's sister, Elisabeth, returned from Nueva Germania in Paraguay following the suicide of her husband. She studied Nietzsche's works and, piece by piece, took control of their publication. Overbeck was dismissed and Gast finally co-operated. After the death of Franziska in 1897, Nietzsche lived in Weimar, where Elisabeth cared for him and allowed visitors, including Rudolf Steiner (who in 1895 had written Friedrich Nietzsche: A Fighter Against His Time, one of the first books praising Nietzsche), to meet her uncommunicative brother. Elisabeth employed Steiner as a tutor to help her to understand her brother's philosophy. Steiner abandoned the attempt after only a few months, declaring that it was impossible to teach her anything about philosophy.

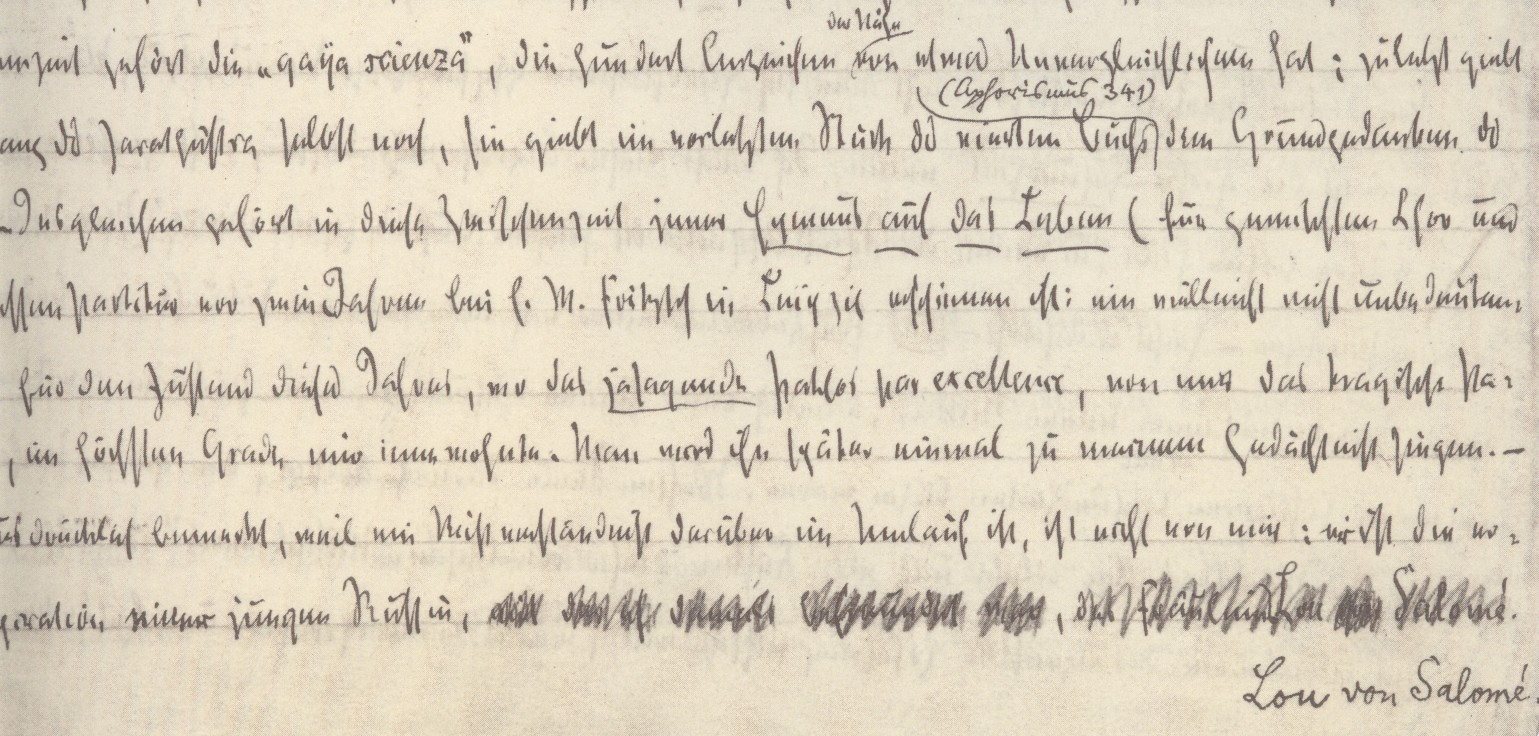
After the breakdown, Peter Gast attempted to systematically organize Nietzsche's fragmentary writings.

Nietzsche's insanity was originally diagnosed as tertiary syphilis, in accordance with a prevailing medical paradigm of the time. Although most commentators regard his breakdown as unrelated to his philosophy, Georges Bataille wrote poetically of his condition ("'Man incarnate' must also go mad") and René Girard's postmortem psychoanalysis posits a worshipful rivalry with Richard Wagner. Girard suggests that Nietzsche signed his final letters as both Dionysus and the Crucified One because he was demonstrating that by being a god (Dionysus), one is also a victim (Crucified One) since a god still suffers by overcoming the law. Nietzsche had previously written, "All superior men who were irresistibly drawn to throw off the yoke of any kind of morality and to frame new laws had, if they were not actually mad, no alternative but to make themselves or pretend to be mad." (Daybreak, 14) The diagnosis of syphilis has since been challenged and a diagnosis of "manic-depressive illness with periodic psychosis followed by vascular dementia" was put forward by Cybulska prior to Schain's study. Leonard Sax suggested the slow growth of a right-sided retro-orbital meningioma as an explanation of Nietzsche's dementia; Orth and Trimble postulated frontotemporal dementia while other researchers have proposed a hereditary stroke disorder called CADASIL. Poisoning by mercury, a treatment for syphilis at the time of Nietzsche's death, has also been suggested.

In 1898 and 1899 Nietzsche suffered at least two strokes. They partially paralysed him, leaving him unable to speak or walk. He likely suffered from clinical hemiparesis/hemiplegia on the left side of his body by 1899. After contracting pneumonia in mid-August 1900, he suffered another stroke during the night of 24–25 August and died at about noon on 25 August. Elisabeth had him buried beside his father at the church in Röcken near Lützen. His friend and secretary Gast gave his funeral oration, proclaiming: "Holy be your name to all future generations!"

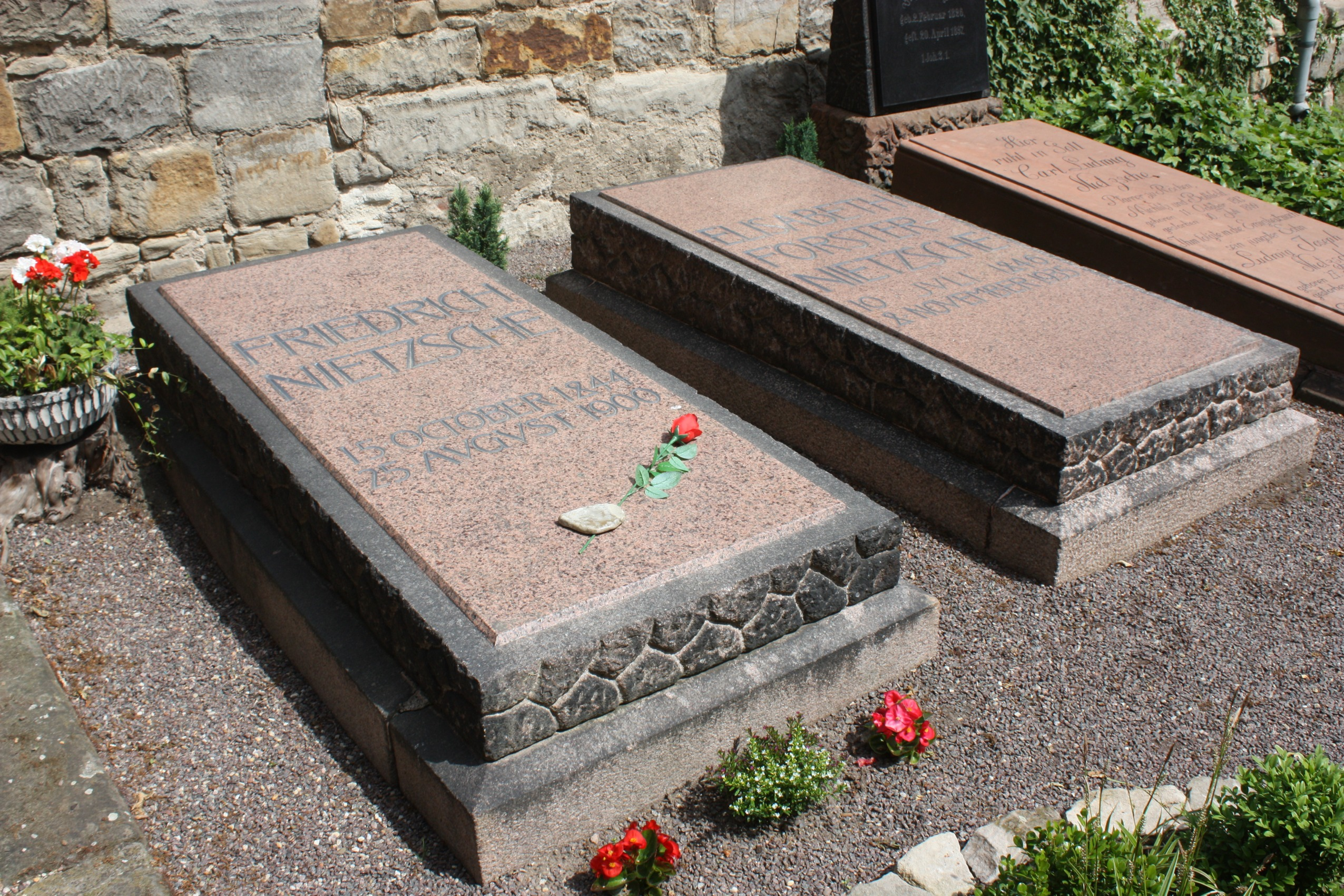
Nietzsche's grave at Röcken in Germany

Elisabeth Förster-Nietzsche compiled The Will to Power from Nietzsche's unpublished notebooks and published it posthumously in 1901. Because his sister arranged the book based on her own conflation of several of Nietzsche's early outlines and took liberties with the material, the scholarly consensus has been that it does not reflect Nietzsche's intent. (For example, Elisabeth removed aphorism 35 of The Antichrist, where Nietzsche rewrote a passage of the Bible.) Mazzino Montinari, the editor of Nietzsche's Nachlass, called it a forgery. Yet, the endeavour to rescue Nietzsche's reputation by discrediting The Will to Power often leads to scepticism about the value of his late notes, even of his whole Nachlass. His Nachlass and The Will to Power are distinct.

=== Citizenship, nationality and ethnicity ===
General commentators and Nietzsche scholars, whether emphasising his cultural background or his language, overwhelmingly label Nietzsche as a "German philosopher". Others do not assign him a national category. While Germany had not yet been unified into a single sovereign state, Nietzsche was born a citizen of Prussia, which was mostly part of the German Confederation. His birthplace, Röcken, is in the modern German state of Saxony-Anhalt. When he accepted his post at Basel, Nietzsche applied for annulment of his Prussian citizenship. The official revocation of his citizenship came in a document dated 17 April 1869, and for the rest of his life he remained officially stateless.

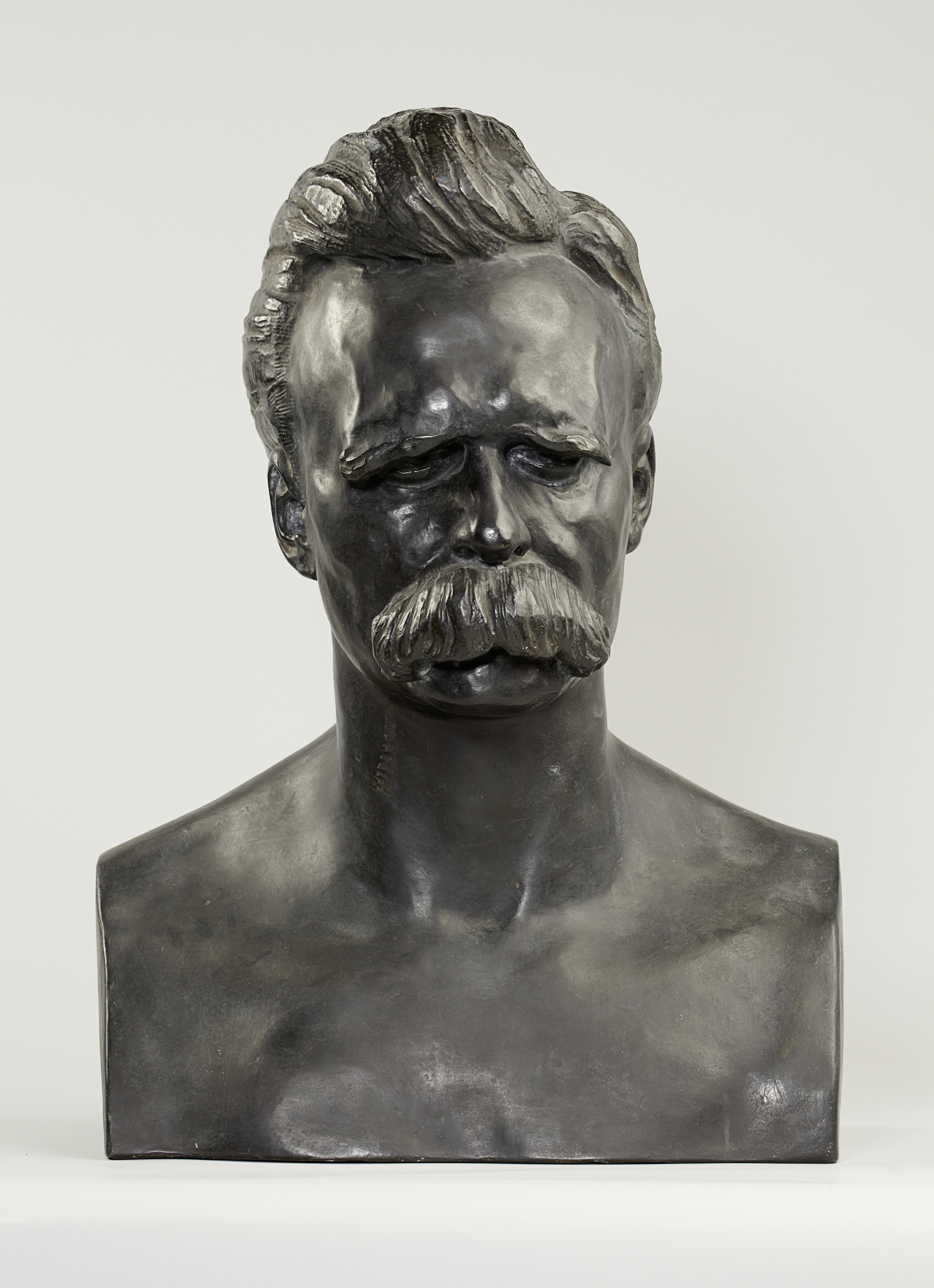
Bust of Nietzsche, by Max Klinger, 1903–1904, at the Städel, Frankfurt

At least towards the end of his life, Nietzsche believed his ancestors were Polish. He wore a signet ring bearing the Radwan coat of arms, traceable back to Polish nobility of medieval times and the surname "Nicki" of the Polish noble (szlachta) family bearing that coat of arms. Gotard Nietzsche, a member of the Nicki family, left Poland for Prussia. His descendants later settled in the Electorate of Saxony circa the year 1700. Nietzsche wrote in 1888, "My ancestors were Polish noblemen (Nietzky); the type seems to have been well preserved despite three generations of German mothers." At one point, Nietzsche became even more adamant about his Polish identity. "I am a pure-blooded Polish nobleman, without a single drop of bad blood, certainly not German blood." On yet another occasion, Nietzsche stated, "Germany is a great nation only because its people have so much Polish blood in their veins.... I am proud of my Polish descent." Nietzsche believed his name might have been Germanised, in one letter claiming, "I was taught to ascribe the origin of my blood and name to Polish noblemen who were called Niëtzky and left their home and nobleness about a hundred years ago, finally yielding to unbearable suppression: they were Protestants."

Most scholars dispute Nietzsche's account of his family's origins. Hans von Müller debunked the genealogy put forward by Nietzsche's sister in favour of Polish noble heritage. Max Oehler, Nietzsche's cousin and curator of the Nietzsche Archive at Weimar, argued that all of Nietzsche's ancestors bore German names, including the wives' families. Oehler claims that Nietzsche came from a long line of German Lutheran clergymen on both sides of his family, and modern scholars regard the claim of Nietzsche's Polish ancestry as "pure invention". Colli and Montinari, the editors of Nietzsche's assembled letters, gloss Nietzsche's claims as a "mistaken belief" and "without foundation". The name Nietzsche itself is not a Polish name, but an exceptionally common one throughout central Germany, in this and cognate forms (such as Nitsche and Nitzke). The name derives from the forename Nikolaus, abbreviated to Nick; assimilated with the Slavic Nitz; it first became Nitsche and then Nietzsche.

It is not known why Nietzsche wanted to be thought of as Polish nobility. According to the biographer R. J. Hollingdale, Nietzsche's propagation of the Polish ancestry myth may have been part of his "campaign against Germany". Nicholas D. More states that Nietzsche's claims of having an illustrious lineage were a parody on autobiographical conventions, and suspects Ecce Homo, with its self-laudatory titles, such as "Why I Am So Wise", as being a work of satire. He concludes that Nietzsche's supposed Polish genealogy was a joke—not a delusion.

=== Relationships and sexuality ===
Nietzsche was never married. He proposed to Lou Salomé three times and each time was rejected. One theory blames Salomé's view on sexuality as one of the reasons for her alienation from Nietzsche. As articulated in her 1898 novella Fenitschka, Salomé viewed the idea of sexual intercourse as prohibitive and marriage as a violation, with some suggesting that they indicated sexual repression and neurosis.

Deussen cited the episode of Cologne's brothel in February 1865 as instrumental to understanding the philosopher's way of thinking, mostly about women. Nietzsche was surreptitiously accompanied to a "call house" from which he clumsily escaped upon seeing "a half dozen apparitions dressed in sequins and veils." According to Deussen, Nietzsche "never decided to remain unmarried all his life. For him, women had to sacrifice themselves to the care and benefit of men." Nietzsche scholar Joachim Köhler has attempted to explain Nietzsche's life history and philosophy by claiming that he was homosexual. Köhler argues that Nietzsche's supposed syphilis, which is "usually considered to be the product of his encounter with a prostitute in a brothel in Cologne or Leipzig, is equally likely. Some maintain that Nietzsche contracted it in a male brothel in Genoa." The acquisition of the infection from a homosexual brothel was the theory believed by Sigmund Freud, who cited Otto Binswanger as his source. Köhler also suggests that Nietzsche had a romantic relationship, as well as a friendship, with Paul Rée. It has been claimed that Nietzsche's homosexuality was widely known in the Vienna Psychoanalytic Society, with Nietzsche's friend Paul Deussen claiming that "he was a man who had never touched a woman."

Köhler's views have not found wide acceptance among Nietzsche scholars and commentators. Allan Megill argues that, while Köhler's claim that Nietzsche was conflicted about his homosexual desire cannot simply be dismissed, "the evidence is very weak", and Köhler may be projecting twentieth-century understandings of sexuality on nineteenth-century notions of friendship. It is also rumoured that Nietzsche frequented heterosexual brothels. Nigel Rodgers and Mel Thompson have argued that continuous sickness and headaches hindered Nietzsche from engaging much with women. Yet they offer examples of Nietzsche's expressing affection to women, including Wagner's wife Cosima Wagner. On Cosima's birthday, on 19 December 1876, Nietzsche, hoping "to gain a confidant", sent her "a trusting letter".

Scholars have argued that Köhler's sexuality-based interpretation is not helpful in understanding Nietzsche's philosophy. Some stress that, if Nietzsche preferred men—with this preference constituting his psychosexual make-up—but could not admit his desires to himself, it meant he acted in conflict with his philosophy.

== Philosophy ==
Because of Nietzsche's evocative style and provocative ideas, his philosophy generates passionate reactions. His works remain controversial, due to varying interpretations. In Western philosophy, Nietzsche's writings have been described as a case of free revolutionary thought, that is, revolutionary in its structure and problems, although not tied to any revolutionary project. His writings have also been described as a revolutionary project in which his philosophy serves as the foundation of a European cultural rebirth.

=== Apollonian and Dionysian ===
The Apollonian and Dionysian is a two-fold philosophical concept based on two figures in ancient Greek mythology, Apollo and Dionysus. This relationship takes the form of a dialectic. Even though the concept is related to The Birth of Tragedy, the poet Friedrich Hölderlin had already spoken of it, and Johann Joachim Winckelmann had talked of Dionysus' Roman equivalent, Bacchus.

Nietzsche found in classical Athenian tragedy an art form that transcended the pessimism found in the so-called wisdom of Silenus. The Greek spectators, by looking into the abyss of human suffering depicted by characters on stage, passionately and joyously affirmed life, finding it worth living. The main theme in The Birth of Tragedy is that the fusion of Dionysian and Apollonian Kunsttriebe ("artistic impulses") forms dramatic arts or tragedies. He argued that this fusion has not been achieved since the ancient Greek tragedians. Apollo represents harmony, progress, clarity, logic and the principle of individuation, whereas Dionysus represents disorder, intoxication, emotion, ecstasy and unity (hence the omission of the principle of individuation).

Nietzsche strongly distinguishes his Dionysus from the Dionysus of the Orphic tradition, which he considers a later corruption of the original Dionysian force. To him in the pre-Homeric world, Dionysian civilisations were marked by barbarism, cruelty, and ecstatic sexual excess, unrestrained by rational or moral principles. Nietzsche associates this period with unmediated life-affirmation, where violence and eroticism intertwined as expressions of raw vitality. The Orphics, overwhelmed by anxiety toward this unmitigated savagery, reacted by turning away from the physical world and abstracting their gods into metaphysical ideas. In doing so, they transformed Dionysus from a figure of visceral power into a god of suffering and redemption and, in parallel, converted man from a being of flesh and instincts into a soul burdened with guilt and the need for purification.

Nietzsche criticises this Orphic reinterpretation as an early decline in Greek spiritual health, arguing that it marked the beginning of an anti-life tendency that would later manifest in Platonism and Christianity. He further argues that Socrates and Euripides continued the Orphic trajectory, replacing instinct, myth, and artistic frenzy with rationalism, dialectic, and moral didacticism. By doing so, they undermined the ecstatic and violent balance of Apollonian and Dionysian forces, ultimately leading to the decline of Greek tragedy.

Nietzsche used these two forces because, for him, the world of mind and order on one side, and passion and chaos on the other, formed principles that were fundamental to the Greek culture: the Apollonian a dreaming state, full of illusions; and Dionysian a state of intoxication, representing the liberation of instincts and dissolution of boundaries. In this mould, a man appears as the satyr. He is the horror of the annihilation of the principle of individuality and at the same time someone who delights in its destruction.

Apollonian and Dionysian juxtapositions appear in the interplay of tragedy: the tragic hero of the drama, the main protagonist, struggles to make (Apollonian) order of his unjust and chaotic (Dionysian) fate, though he dies unfulfilled. Elaborating on the conception of Hamlet as an intellectual who cannot make up his mind, and is a living antithesis to the man of action, Nietzsche argues that a Dionysian figure possesses the conviction that his actions cannot change the eternal balance of things, and it disgusts him enough not to act at all. Hamlet falls under this category—he glimpsed the supernatural reality through the Ghost; he has gained 'true knowledge' and the conviction that no action of his has the power to change this. For the audience of such drama, this tragedy allows them to sense what Nietzsche called the Primordial Unity, which revives Dionysian nature. He describes primordial unity as the increase of strength, the experience of fullness and plenitude bestowed by frenzy. Frenzy acts as intoxication and is crucial for the physiological condition that enables the creation of any art. Stimulated by this state, a person's artistic will is enhanced:

In this state one enriches everything out of one's own fullness: whatever one sees, whatever wills is seen swelled, taut, strong, overloaded with strength. A man in this state transforms things until they mirror his power—until they are reflections of his perfection. This having to transform into perfection is—art.

Nietzsche is adamant that the works of Aeschylus and Sophocles represent the apex of artistic creation, the true realisation of tragedy; it is with Euripides, that tragedy begins its Untergang (literally 'going under' or 'downward-way;' meaning decline, deterioration, downfall, death, etc.). Nietzsche objects to Euripides' use of Socratic rationalism and morality in his tragedies, claiming that the infusion of ethics and reason robs tragedy of its foundation, namely the fragile balance of the Dionysian and Apollonian. Socrates emphasised reason to such a degree that he diffused the value of myth and suffering to human knowledge. Plato continued along this path in his dialogues, and the modern world eventually inherited reason at the expense of artistic impulses found in the Apollonian and Dionysian dichotomy. He notes that without the Apollonian, the Dionysian lacks the form and structure to make a coherent piece of art, and without the Dionysian, the Apollonian lacks the necessary vitality and passion. Only the fertile interplay of these two forces brought together as an art represented the best of Greek tragedy.

An example of the impact of this idea can be seen in the book Patterns of Culture, where the anthropologist Ruth Benedict acknowledges Nietzschean opposites of "Apollonian" and "Dionysian" as the stimulus for her thoughts about Native American cultures. Carl Jung has written extensively on the dichotomy in Psychological Types. Michel Foucault commented that his own book Madness and Civilization should be read "under the sun of the great Nietzschean inquiry". Here Foucault referenced Nietzsche's description of the birth and death of tragedy and his explanation that the subsequent tragedy of the Western world was the refusal of the tragic and, with that, refusal of the sacred. The painter Mark Rothko was influenced by Nietzsche's view of tragedy presented in The Birth of Tragedy.

=== Death of God and nihilism ===
The statement "God is dead", occurring in several of Nietzsche's works (notably in The Gay Science), has become one of his best-known remarks. On the basis of it, many commentators regard Nietzsche as an atheist; others (such as Kaufmann) suggest that this statement might reflect a more subtle understanding of divinity. Nietzsche predicted that the scientific developments and the increasing secularisation of Europe had 'killed' the Abrahamic God in a metaphorical sense, who had served as the basis for meaning and value in the West for more than a thousand years.

Nietzsche believed that Christian moral doctrine was originally constructed to counteract nihilism. It provides people with traditional beliefs about the moral values of good and evil, belief in God, and a framework with which one might claim to have objective knowledge. In constructing a world where objective knowledge is supposed to be possible, Christianity is an antidote to a primal form of nihilism—the despair of meaninglessness. As Martin Heidegger put the problem, "If God as the suprasensory ground and goal of all reality is dead, if the suprasensory world of the ideas has suffered the loss of its obligatory and above it its vitalising and upbuilding power, then nothing more remains to which man can cling and by which he can orient himself."

One such reaction to the loss of meaning is what Nietzsche called passive nihilism, which he recognised in the pessimistic philosophy of Arthur Schopenhauer. Schopenhauer's doctrine—which Nietzsche also referred to as Western Buddhism—advocates separating oneself from will and desires to reduce suffering. Nietzsche characterised this ascetic attitude as a "will to nothingness". Life turns away from itself as there is nothing of value to be found in the world. This moving away of all value in the world is characteristic of the nihilist, although, in this, the nihilist appears to be inconsistent; this "will to nothingness" is still a (disavowed) form of willing.

A nihilist is a man who judges that the real world ought not to be and that the world as it ought to do not exist. According to this view, our existence (action, suffering, willing, feeling) has no meaning: this 'in vain' is the nihilists' pathos—an inconsistency on the part of the nihilists.

— Friedrich Nietzsche, KSA 12:9 [60], taken from The Will to Power, section 585, translated by Walter Kaufmann

Nietzsche approached the problem of nihilism as a deeply personal one, stating that this problem of the modern world had "become conscious" in him. Furthermore, he emphasised the danger of nihilism and the possibilities it offers, as seen in his statement that "I praise, I do not reproach, [nihilism's] arrival. I believe it is one of the greatest crises, a moment of the deepest self-reflection of humanity. Whether man recovers from it, whether he becomes a master of this crisis, is a question of his strength!" According to Nietzsche, it is only when nihilism is overcome that a culture can have a true foundation on which to thrive. He wished to hasten its coming only so that he could also hasten its ultimate departure. Heidegger interpreted the death of God with what he explained as the death of metaphysics. He concluded that metaphysics has reached its potential and that the ultimate fate and downfall of metaphysics was proclaimed with the statement "God is dead."

Scholars such as Keiji Nishitani and Graham Parkes have aligned Nietzsche's religious thought with Buddhist thinkers, particularly those of the Mahayana tradition. Occasionally, Nietzsche has also been considered in relation to Catholic mystics such as Meister Eckhart. Milne has argued against such interpretations on the grounds that such thinkers from Western and Eastern religious traditions strongly emphasise the divestment of will and the loss of ego, while Nietzsche offers a robust defence of egoism. Milne argues that Nietzsche's religious thought is better understood in relation to his self-professed ancestors: "Heraclitus, Empedocles, Spinoza, Goethe". Milne plays particularly close attention to Nietzsche's relationship to Goethe, who has typically been neglected in research by academic philosophers. Milne shows that Goethe's views on the one and the many allow a reciprocal determinism between part and whole, meaning that a claimed identity between part and whole does not give the part value solely in terms of belonging to the whole. In essence, this allows for a unitive sense of the individual's relationship to the universe, while also fostering a sense of "self-esteem" which Nietzsche found lacking in mystics such as Eckhart.

With regard to Nietzsche's development of thought, it has been noted in research that although he dealt with "nihilistic" themes ("pessimism, with nirvana and with nothingness and non-being") from 1869 onwards, a conceptual use of nihilism first took place in handwritten notes in mid-1880. This period saw the publication of a then popular work that reconstructed so-called "Russian nihilism" on the basis of Russian newspaper reports (N. Karlowitsch: The Development of Nihilism. Berlin 1880), which is significant for Nietzsche's terminology .

=== Eternal return ===
"Eternal return" (also known as "eternal recurrence") is a hypothetical concept that posits that the universe has been recurring, and will continue to recur, for an infinite number of times across infinite time or space. It is a purely physical concept, involving no supernatural reincarnation, but the return of beings in the same bodies. Nietzsche first proposed the idea of eternal return in a parable in Section 341 of The Gay Science, and also in the chapter "Of the Vision and the Riddle" in Thus Spoke Zarathustra, among other places. Nietzsche considered it as potentially "horrifying and paralyzing", and said that its burden is the "heaviest weight" imaginable (" das schwerste Gewicht"). The wish for the eternal return of all events would mark the ultimate affirmation of life, a reaction to Schopenhauer's praise of denying the will-to-live. To comprehend eternal recurrence, and not only come to peace with it but embrace it, requires amor fati, "love of fate". As Martin Heidegger noted in his lectures on Nietzsche, Nietzsche's first mention of eternal recurrence presents this concept as a hypothetical question rather than stating it as fact. According to Heidegger, it is the burden imposed by the question of eternal recurrence – the mere possibility of it, and the reality of speculating on that possibility – which is so significant in modern thought: "The way Nietzsche here patterns the first communication of the thought of the 'greatest burden' [of eternal recurrence] makes it clear that this 'thought of thoughts' is at the same time 'the most burdensome thought.'"

Alexander Nehamas writes in Nietzsche: Life as Literature of three ways of seeing the eternal recurrence:

1. "My life will recur in exactly identical fashion:" this expresses a totally fatalistic approach to the idea;
2. "My life may recur in exactly identical fashion:" This second view conditionally asserts cosmology, but fails to capture what Nietzsche refers to in The Gay Science, p. 341; and finally,
3. "If my life were to recur, then it could recur only in identical fashion." Nehamas shows that this interpretation exists totally independently of physics and does not presuppose the truth of cosmology.

Nehamas concluded that, if individuals constitute themselves through their actions, they can only maintain themselves in their current state by living in a recurrence of past actions. Nietzsche's thought is the negation of the idea of a history of salvation.

=== Perspectivism ===
Nietzsche claimed the death of God would eventually lead to the realisation that there can never be a universal perspective on life and everyday activity, and that the traditional idea of objective truth is incoherent. Nietzsche rejected the idea of objective reality, arguing that knowledge is contingent and conditional, relative to various fluid perspectives or interests. This leads to constant reassessment of rules (i.e., those of philosophy, the scientific method, etc.) according to the circumstances of individual perspectives. This view has acquired the name perspectivism.

In Thus Spoke Zarathustra Nietzsche proclaimed that a table of values hangs above every great person. He pointed out that what is common among different peoples is the act of esteeming, of creating values, even if the values are different from one person to the next. Nietzsche asserted that what made people great was not the content of their beliefs, but the act of valuing. Thus the values a community strives to articulate are not as important as the collective will to see those values come to pass. The willingness is more essential than the merit of the goal itself, according to Nietzsche. "A thousand goals have there been so far", says Zarathustra, "for there are a thousand peoples. Only the yoke for the thousand necks is still lacking: the one goal is lacking. Humanity still has no goal." Hence, the title of the aphorism, "On The Thousand And One Goal". The idea that one value-system is no more worthy than the next, although it may not be directly ascribed to Nietzsche, has become a common premise in modern social science. Max Weber and Martin Heidegger absorbed it and made it their own. It shaped their philosophical and cultural endeavours, as well as their political understanding. Weber, for example, relied on Nietzsche's perspectivism by maintaining that objectivity is still possible—but only after a particular perspective, value, or end has been established.

Among his critique of traditional philosophy of Immanuel Kant, René Descartes and Plato in Beyond Good and Evil, Nietzsche attacked the thing in itself and cogito ergo sum ("I think, therefore I am") as unfalsifiable beliefs based on naive acceptance of previous notions and fallacies. The philosopher Alasdair MacIntyre put Nietzsche in a high place in the history of philosophy. While criticising nihilism and Nietzsche together as a sign of general decay, he still commended him for recognising psychological motives behind Kant and David Hume's moral philosophy:

For it was Nietzsche's historic achievement to understand more clearly than any other philosopher ... not only that what purported to be appeals of objectivity were in fact expressions of subjective will, but also the nature of the problems that this posed for philosophy.

=== Slave revolt in morals ===
In Beyond Good and Evil and On the Genealogy of Morality Nietzsche's genealogical account of the development of modern moral systems occupies a central place. For Nietzsche a fundamental shift took place during the human history from thinking in terms of "good and bad" toward "good and evil".

The initial form of morality was set by a warrior aristocracy and other ruling castes of ancient civilisations. Aristocratic values of good and bad coincided with and reflected their relationship to lower castes such as slaves. Nietzsche presented this "master morality" as the original system of morality—perhaps best associated with Homeric Greece. To be "good" was to be happy and to have the things related to happiness: wealth, strength, health, power, etc. To be "bad" was to be like the slaves over whom the aristocracy ruled: poor, weak, sick, pathetic—objects of pity or disgust rather than hatred.

"Slave morality" developed as a reaction to master morality. Value emerges from the contrast between good and evil: good being associated with other-worldliness, charity, piety, restraint, meekness, and submission; while evil is worldly, cruel, selfish, wealthy, and aggressive. Nietzsche saw slave morality as pessimistic and fearful, its values emerging to improve the self-perception of slaves. He associated slave morality with the Jewish and Christian traditions, as it is born out of the ressentiment of slaves. Nietzsche argued that the idea of equality allowed slaves to overcome their own conditions without despising themselves. By denying the inherent inequality of people—in success, strength, beauty, and intelligence—slaves acquired a method of escape, namely by generating new values on the basis of rejecting master morality. It was used as an attempt to overcome the slave's sense of inferiority before their (better-off) masters. It does so by depicting slave weakness, for example, as a matter of choice, by relabelling it as "meekness". The "good man" of master morality is precisely the "evil man" of slave morality, while the "bad man" is recast as the "good man". Slave morality, however, leads to seeing the present state of the world as unjust, and creates the need for a belief in an afterlife, where the "evil man" (the master) will be punished, while the "good man" (the slave) will be rewarded.

Nietzsche saw slave morality as a source of the nihilism that has overtaken Europe: it had led to view earthly life as inherently unfair, only justified as a prelude to the world to come; as such, the ever-increasing loss of belief in religion and Heaven had led to utter despair and pessimism. Furthermore, modern Europe and Christianity exist in a hypocritical state due to a tension between master and slave morality, both contradictory values determining, to varying degrees, the values of most Europeans (who are "motley"). Nietzsche called for exceptional people not to be ashamed in the face of a supposed morality-for-all, which he deems to be harmful to the flourishing of exceptional people. He cautioned that morality, per se, is not bad; it is good for the masses and should be left to them. Exceptional people, in contrast, should follow their own "inner law". A favourite motto of Nietzsche, taken from Pindar, reads: "Become what you are."

A long-standing assumption about Nietzsche is that he preferred master over slave morality. The eminent Nietzsche scholar Walter Kaufmann rejected this interpretation, writing that Nietzsche's analyses of these two types of morality were used only in a descriptive and historic sense; they were not meant for any kind of acceptance or glorification. On the other hand, Nietzsche called master morality "a higher order of values, the noble ones, those that say Yes to life, those that guarantee the future". Just as "there is an order of rank between man and man", there is also an order of rank "between morality and morality". Nietzsche waged a philosophic war against the slave morality of Christianity in his "revaluation of all values" to bring about the victory of a new master morality that he called the "philosophy of the future" (Beyond Good and Evil is subtitled Prelude to a Philosophy of the Future).

In Daybreak Nietzsche began his "Campaign against Morality". He called himself an "immoralist" and harshly criticised the prominent moral philosophies of his day: Christianity, Kantianism and utilitarianism. Nietzsche's concept "God is dead" applies to the doctrines of Christendom, though not to all other faiths: he claimed that Buddhism is a successful religion that he complimented for fostering critical thought. Still, Nietzsche saw his philosophy as a counter-movement to nihilism through appreciation of art:

Art as the single superior counterforce against all will to negation of life, art as the anti-Christian, anti-Buddhist, anti-Nihilist par excellence.

Nietzsche claimed that the Christian faith as practised was not a proper representation of Jesus' teachings, as it forced people merely to believe in the way of Jesus but not to act as Jesus did; in particular, his example of refusing to judge people, something that Christians constantly did. He condemned institutionalised Christianity for emphasising a morality of pity (Mitleid), which assumes an inherent illness in society:

Christianity is called the religion of pity. Pity stands opposed to the tonic emotions which heighten our vitality: it has a depressing effect. We are deprived of strength when we feel pity. That loss of strength in which suffering as such inflicts on life is still further increased and multiplied by pity. Pity makes suffering contagious.

In Ecce Homo Nietzsche called the establishment of moral systems based on a dichotomy of good and evil a "calamitous error", and wished to initiate a re-evaluation of the values of the Christian world. He indicated his desire to bring about a new, more naturalistic source of value in the vital impulses of life itself.

While Nietzsche attacked the principles of Judaism, he was not antisemitic: in his work On the Genealogy of Morality, he explicitly condemned antisemitism and pointed out that his attack on Judaism was not an attack on contemporary Jewish people but specifically an attack upon the ancient Jewish priesthood on whom he claimed antisemitic Christians paradoxically based their views.

Nietzsche felt that modern antisemitism was "despicable" and contrary to European ideals. Its cause, in his opinion, was the growth in European nationalism and the endemic "jealousy and hatred" of Jewish success. He wrote that Jews should be thanked for helping uphold a respect for the philosophies of ancient Greece, and for giving rise to "the noblest human being (Christ), the purest philosopher (Baruch Spinoza), the mightiest book, and the most effective moral code in the world".

=== Übermensch ===
Another concept important to understanding Nietzsche is the Übermensch (Superman). Writing about nihilism in Also Sprach Zarathustra, Nietzsche introduced an Übermensch. According to Laurence Lampert, "the death of God must be followed by a long twilight of piety and nihilism (II. 19; III. 8). Zarathustra's gift of the overman is given to mankind not aware of the problem to which the overman is the solution." Zarathustra presents the Übermensch as the creator of new values, and he appears as a solution to the problem of the death of God and nihilism. The Übermensch does not follow the morality of common people since that favours mediocrity but rises above the notion of good and evil and above the "herd". In this way Zarathustra proclaims his ultimate goal as the journey towards the state of the Übermensch. He wants a kind of spiritual evolution of self-awareness and overcoming of traditional views on morality and justice that stem from the superstitious beliefs still deeply rooted or related to the notion of God and Christianity.

From Thus Spoke Zarathustra (Zarathustra's Prologue; pp. 9–11):

I teach you the Übermensch. Man is something that shall be overcome. What have you done to overcome him? All beings so far have created something beyond themselves: and you want to be the ebb of that great tide, and would rather go back to the beast than overcome man? What is the ape to man? A laughing-stock or a painful embarrassment. And just the same shall man be to the Übermensch: a laughing-stock or a painful embarrassment. You have made your way from worm to man, and much within you is still worm. Once you were apes, and even yet man is more of an ape than any ape. Even the wisest among you is only a conflict and hybrid of plant and ghost. But do I bid you become ghosts or plants? Behold, I teach you the Übermensch! The Übermensch is the meaning of the earth. Let your will say: The Übermensch shall be the meaning of the earth... Man is a rope stretched between the animal and the Übermensch—a rope over an abyss... What is great in man is that he is a bridge and not a goal: what is lovable in man is that he is an over-going and a going under.

Zarathustra contrasts the Übermensch with the last man of egalitarian modernity (the most obvious example being democracy), an alternative goal humanity might set for itself. The last man is possible only by mankind's having bred an apathetic creature who has no great passion or commitment, who is unable to dream, who merely earns his living and keeps warm. This concept appears only in Thus Spoke Zarathustra, and is presented as a condition that would render the creation of the Übermensch impossible.

Some have suggested that the eternal return is related to the Übermensch, since willing the eternal return of the same is a necessary step if the Übermensch is to create new values untainted by the spirit of gravity or asceticism. Values involve a rank-ordering of things, and so are inseparable from approval and disapproval, yet it was dissatisfaction that prompted men to seek refuge in other-worldliness and embrace other-worldly values. It could seem that the Übermensch, in being devoted to any values at all, would necessarily fail to create values that did not share some bit of asceticism. Willing the eternal recurrence is presented as accepting the existence of the low while still recognising it as the low, and thus as overcoming the spirit of gravity or asceticism. One must have the strength of the Übermensch to will the eternal recurrence. Only the Übermensch will have the strength to fully accept all of his past life, including his failures and misdeeds, and to truly will their eternal return. This action nearly kills Zarathustra, for example, and most human beings cannot avoid other-worldliness because they really are sick, not because of any choice they made.

The Nazis attempted to incorporate the concept into their ideology by means of taking Nietzsche's figurative form of speech and creating a literal superiority over other ethnicities. After Nietzsche's death his sister, Elisabeth Förster-Nietzsche, became the curator and editor of his manuscripts. She reworked Nietzsche's unpublished writings to fit her own German nationalist ideology while often contradicting or obfuscating Nietzsche's stated opinions, which were explicitly opposed to antisemitism and nationalism. Through her published editions, Nietzsche's work became associated with fascism and Nazism; 20th-century scholars contested this interpretation of his work and corrected editions of his writings were soon made available.

Although Nietzsche has been misrepresented as a predecessor to Nazism, he criticised antisemitism, pan-Germanism and, to a lesser extent, nationalism. Thus, he broke with his editor in 1886 because of his opposition to his editor's antisemitic stances, and his rupture with Richard Wagner, expressed in The Case of Wagner and Nietzsche contra Wagner, both of which he wrote in 1888, had much to do with Wagner's endorsement of pan-Germanism and antisemitism—and also of his rallying to Christianity. In a 29 March 1887 letter to Theodor Fritsch, Nietzsche mocked antisemites, Fritsch, Eugen Dühring, Wagner, Ebrard, Adolf Wahrmund, and the leading advocate of pan-Germanism, Paul de Lagarde, who would become, along with Wagner and Houston Chamberlain, the main official influences of Nazism. This 1887 letter to Fritsch ended by: "And finally, how do you think I feel when the name Zarathustra is mouthed by anti-Semites?" In contrast to these examples, Nietzsche's close friend Franz Overbeck recalled in his memoirs, "When he speaks frankly, the opinions he expresses about Jews go, in their severity, beyond any anti-Semitism. The foundation of his anti-Christianity is essentially anti-Semitic."

=== Will to power ===
A basic element in Nietzsche's philosophical outlook is the "will to power" (der Wille zur Macht), which he maintained provides a basis for understanding human behaviour—more so than competing explanations, such as the ones based on pressure for adaptation or survival. As such, according to Nietzsche, the drive for conservation appears as the major motivator of human or animal behaviour only in exceptions, as the general condition of life is not one of a 'struggle for existence.' More often than not, self-conservation is a consequence of a creature's will to exert its strength on the outside world.

In presenting his theory of human behaviour, Nietzsche also addressed and attacked concepts from philosophies then popularly embraced, such as Schopenhauer's notion of an aimless will or that of utilitarianism. Utilitarians claim that what moves people is the desire to be happy and accumulate pleasure in their lives. But such a conception of happiness Nietzsche rejected as something limited to, and characteristic of, the bourgeois lifestyle of the English society, and instead put forth the idea that happiness is not an aim per se. It is a consequence of overcoming hurdles to one's actions and the fulfilment of the will.

Related to his theory of the will to power is his speculation, which he did not deem final, regarding the reality of the physical world, including inorganic matter—that, like man's affections and impulses, the material world is also set by the dynamics of a form of the will to power. At the core of his theory is a rejection of atomism—the idea that matter is composed of stable, indivisible units (atoms). Instead, he seemed to have accepted the conclusions of Ruđer Bošković, who explained the qualities of matter as a result of an interplay of forces. (Note: Nietzsche comments in many notes about the matter being a hypothesis drawn from the metaphysics of substance. Whitlock, G. (1996). "Roger Boscovich, Benedict de Spinoza and Friedrich Nietzsche: The Untold Story". Nietzsche-Studien. 25: 207. doi:10.1515/9783110244441.200. S2CID 171148597.) One study of Nietzsche defines his fully developed concept of the will to power as "the element from which derive both the quantitative difference of related forces and the quality that devolves into each force in this relation" revealing the will to power as "the principle of the synthesis of forces". Of such forces Nietzsche said they could perhaps be viewed as a primitive form of the will. Likewise, he rejected the view that the movement of bodies is ruled by inexorable laws of nature, positing instead that movement was governed by the power relations between bodies and forces.

Other scholars disagree that Nietzsche considered the material world to be a form of the will to power: Nietzsche thoroughly criticised metaphysics, and by including the will to power in the material world, he would simply be setting up a new metaphysics. Other than Aphorism 36 in Beyond Good and Evil, where he raised a question regarding will to power as being in the material world, they argue, it was only in his notes (unpublished by himself), where he wrote about a metaphysical will to power. And they also claim that Nietzsche directed his landlord to burn those notes in 1888 when he left Sils Maria. According to these scholars, the "burning" story supports their thesis that Nietzsche rejected his project on the will to power at the end of his lucid life. A study (Huang 2019) shows that although it is true that in 1888 Nietzsche wanted some of his notes burned, this indicates little about his project on the will to power, not only because only 11 "aphorisms" saved from the flames were ultimately incorporated into The Will to Power (this book contains 1067 "aphorisms"), but also because these abandoned notes mainly focus on topics such as the critique of morality while touching upon the "feeling of power" only once.

== Reading and influence ==
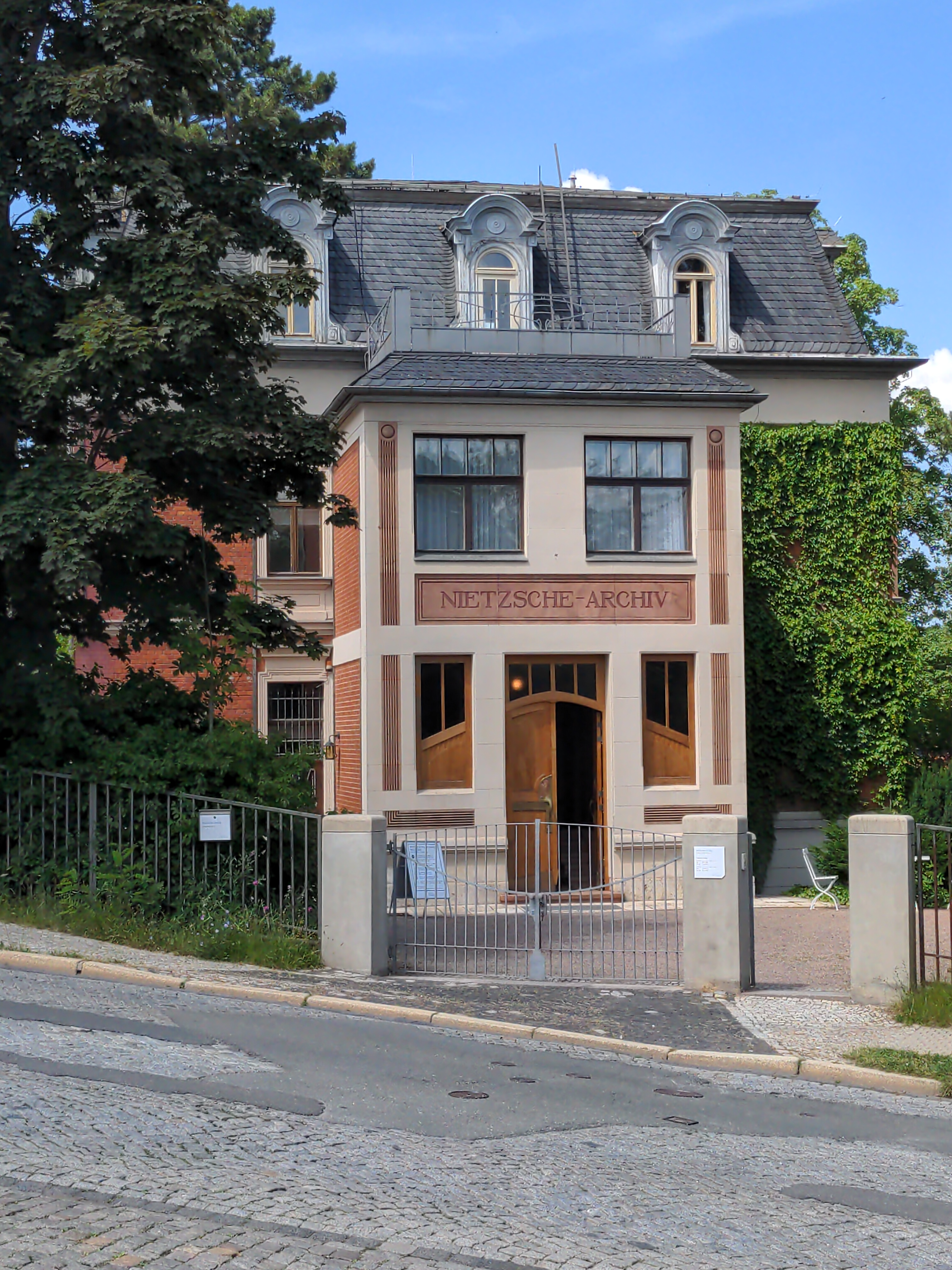
The residence of Nietzsche's last three years along with archive in Weimar, Germany, which holds many of Nietzsche's papers

A trained philologist, Nietzsche had a thorough knowledge of Greek philosophy. He read Immanuel Kant, Plato, John Stuart Mill, Arthur Schopenhauer and Afrikan Spir, who became the main opponents in his philosophy, and later engaged, via the work of Kuno Fischer in particular, with the thought of Baruch Spinoza, whom he saw as his "precursor" in many respects but as a personification of the "ascetic ideal" in others. Nietzsche referred to Kant as a "moral fanatic", Plato as "boring", Mill as a "blockhead", and of Spinoza, he asked: "How much of personal timidity and vulnerability does this masquerade of a sickly recluse betray?" He likewise expressed contempt for the English novelist George Eliot.

Nietzsche's philosophy, while innovative and revolutionary, was indebted to many predecessors. While at Basel, Nietzsche lectured on pre-Platonic philosophers for several years, and the text of this lecture series has been characterised as a "lost link" in the development of his thought. "In it, concepts such as the will to power, the eternal return of the same, the overman, gay science, self-overcoming and so on receive rough, unnamed formulations and are linked to specific pre-Platonic, especially Heraclitus, who emerges as a pre-Platonic Nietzsche." The pre-Socratic philosopher Heraclitus was known for rejecting the concept of being as a constant and eternal principle of the universe and embracing "flux" and incessant change. His symbolism of the world as "child play" marked by amoral spontaneity and lack of definite rules was appreciated by Nietzsche. Due to his Heraclitean sympathies, Nietzsche was also a vociferous critic of Parmenides, who, in contrast to Heraclitus, viewed the world as a single, unchanging Being.

In his Egotism in German Philosophy the philosopher George Santayana claimed that Nietzsche's whole philosophy was a reaction to Schopenhauer. Santayana wrote that Nietzsche's work was "an emendation of that of Schopenhauer. The will to live would become the will to dominate; pessimism founded on reflection would become optimism founded on courage; the suspense of the will in contemplation would yield to a more biological account of intelligence and taste; finally in the place of pity and asceticism (Schopenhauer's two principles of morals) Nietzsche would set up the duty of asserting the will at all costs and being cruelly but beautifully strong. These points of difference from Schopenhauer cover the whole philosophy of Nietzsche."

The superficial similarity of Nietzsche's Übermensch to Thomas Carlyle's Hero as well as both authors' rhetorical prose style has led to speculation concerning the degree to which Nietzsche might have been influenced by his reading of Carlyle. G. K. Chesterton believed that "Out of [Carlyle] flows most of the philosophy of Nietzsche", qualifying his statement by adding that they were "profoundly different" in character. Ruth apRoberts has shown that Carlyle anticipated Nietzsche in asserting the importance of metaphor (with Nietzsche's metaphor-fiction theory "appear[ing] to owe something to Carlyle"), announcing the death of God, and recognising both Goethe's Entsagen (renunciation) and Novalis's Selbsttödtung (self-annihilation) as prerequisites for engaging in philosophy. apRoberts writes that "Nietzsche and Carlyle had the same German sources, but Nietzsche may owe more to Carlyle than he cares to admit", noting that "[Nietzsche] takes the trouble to repudiate Carlyle with malicious emphasis." Ralph Jessop, senior lecturer at the University of Glasgow, argues a reassessment of Carlyle's influence on Nietzsche is "long-overdue".

Nietzsche expressed admiration for 17th-century French moralists such as François de La Rochefoucauld, Jean de La Bruyère and Luc de Clapiers, marquis de Vauvenargues, as well as for Stendhal. The organicism of Paul Bourget influenced Nietzsche, as did that of Rudolf Virchow and Alfred Espinas. In 1867 Nietzsche wrote in a letter that he was trying to improve his German style of writing with the help of Gotthold Ephraim Lessing, Georg Christoph Lichtenberg and Schopenhauer. It was probably Lichtenberg (along with Paul Rée) whose aphoristic style of writing contributed to Nietzsche's own use of aphorism. Nietzsche early learned of Darwinism through Friedrich Albert Lange. The essays of Ralph Waldo Emerson had a profound influence on Nietzsche, who "loved Emerson from first to last", wrote "Never have I felt so much at home in a book", and called him "[the] author who has been richest in ideas in this century so far". Hippolyte Taine influenced Nietzsche's view on Jean-Jacques Rousseau and Napoleon. Notably, he also read some of the posthumous works of Charles Baudelaire, Leo Tolstoy's My Religion, Ernest Renan's Life of Jesus, and Fyodor Dostoevsky's Demons. Nietzsche called Dostoevsky "the only psychologist from whom I have anything to learn". While Nietzsche never mentions Max Stirner, the similarities in their ideas have prompted a minority of interpreters to suggest a relationship between the two.

In 1861 Nietzsche wrote an enthusiastic essay on his "favourite poet", Friedrich Hölderlin, mostly forgotten at that time. He also expressed deep appreciation for Adalbert Stifter's Indian Summer, Lord Byron's Manfred and Mark Twain's Tom Sawyer.

A translation by Louis Jacolliot of the Calcutta version of the ancient Hindu text the Manusmriti was reviewed by Nietzsche. He commented on it both favourably and unfavourably:

- He deemed it "an incomparably spiritual and superior work" to the Christian Bible, observed that "the sun shines on the whole book" and attributed its ethical perspective to "the noble classes, the philosophers and warriors, [who] stand above the mass". Nietzsche does not advocate a caste system, states David Conway, but endorses the political exclusion conveyed in the Manu text. Nietzsche considered Manu's social order as far from perfect, but considers the general idea of a caste system to be natural and right, and stated that "caste-order, order of rank is just a formula for the supreme law of life itself", a "natural order, lawfulness par excellence". According to Nietzsche, states Julian Young, "Nature, not Manu, separates from each other: predominantly spiritual people, people characterized by muscular and temperamental strength, and a third group of people who are not distinguished in either way, the average". He wrote that "To prepare a book of law in the style of Manu means to give a people the right to become master one day, to become perfect, – to aspire to the highest art of life."
- The Law of Manu was also criticised by Nietzsche. Nietzsche writes, "these regulations teach us enough, in them we find for once Aryan humanity, quite pure, quite primordial, we learn that the concept of pure blood is the opposite of a harmless concept."

== Reception and legacy ==
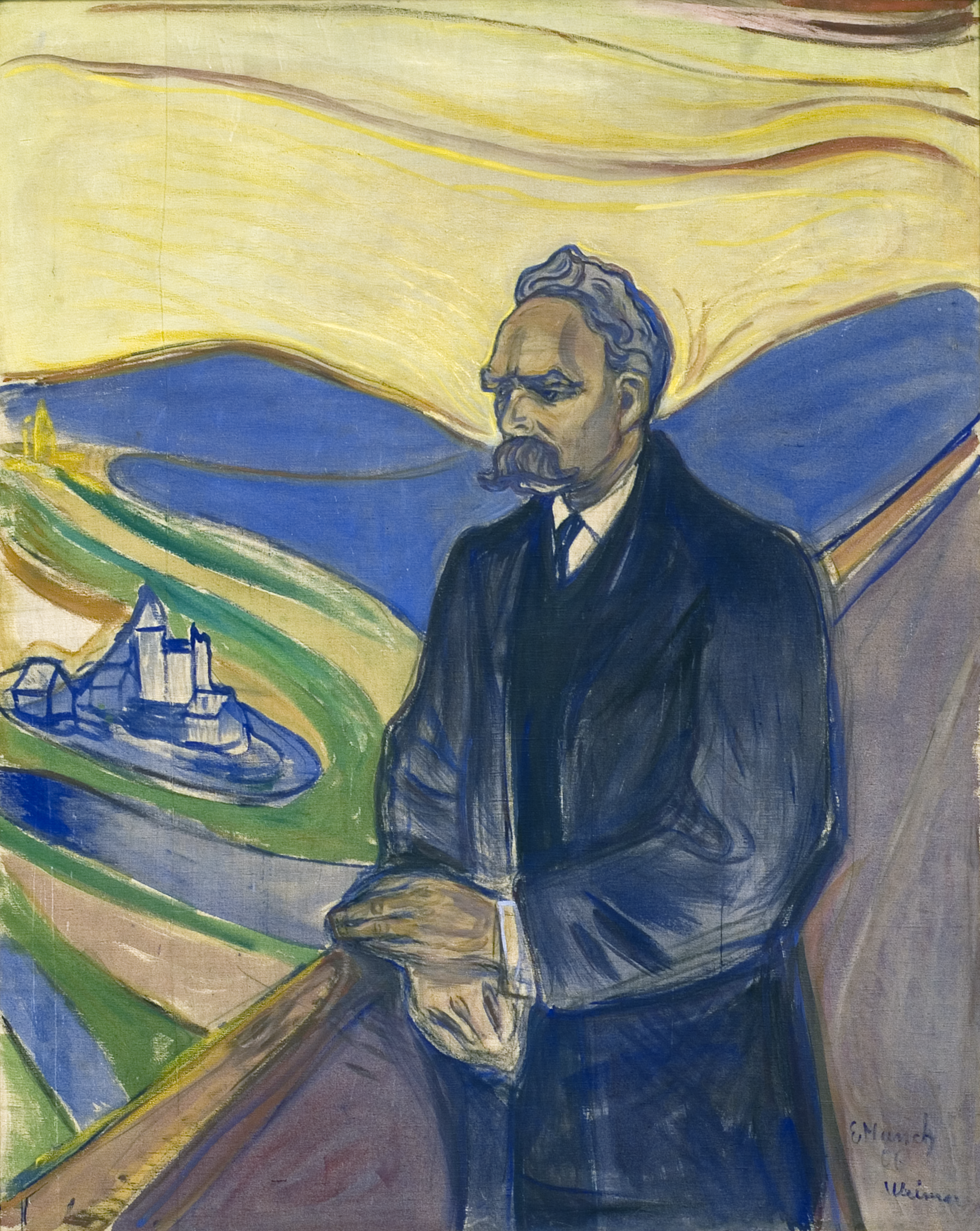
Portrait of Nietzsche by Edvard Munch, 1906, at the Thiel Gallery, Stockholm

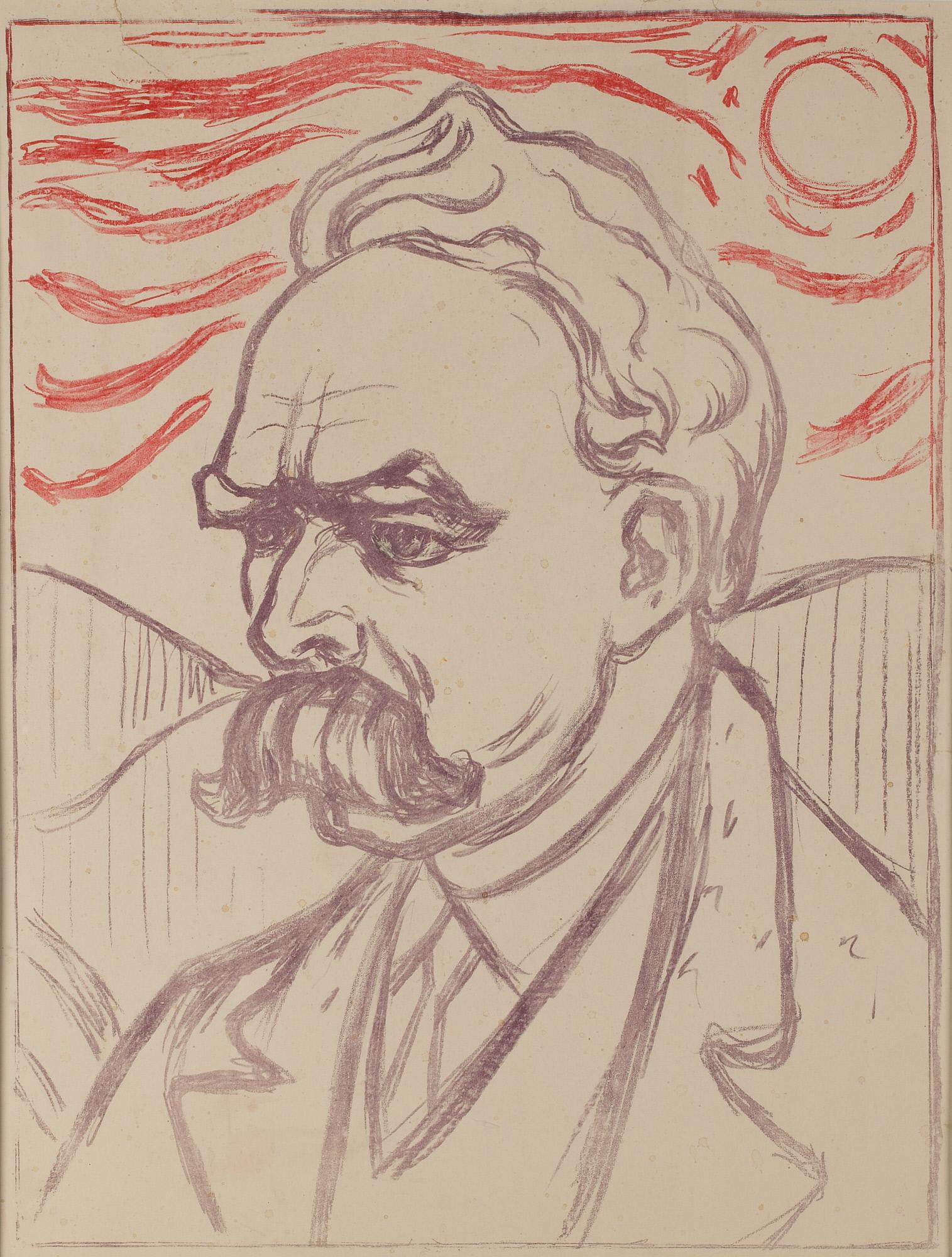
Another sketch by Edvard Munch

Nietzsche's works did not reach a wide readership during his active writing career. In 1888 the influential Danish critic Georg Brandes aroused considerable excitement about Nietzsche through a series of lectures he gave at the University of Copenhagen. In the years after Nietzsche's death in 1900, his works became better known, and readers have responded to them in complex and sometimes controversial ways. Many Germans eventually discovered his appeals for greater individualism and personality development in Thus Spoke Zarathustra, but responded to them divergently. He had some following among left-wing Germans in the 1890s; in 1894–1895 German conservatives wanted to ban his work as subversive. During the late 19th century Nietzsche's ideas were commonly associated with anarchist movements and appear to have had influence within them, particularly in France, Germany, Britain and the United States. Gustav Landauer is credited with the most in-depth appreciation and critique of Nietzsche's ideas from an anarchist perspective. H. L. Mencken produced the first book on Nietzsche in English in 1907, The Philosophy of Friedrich Nietzsche, and in 1910 a book of translated paragraphs from Nietzsche, increasing knowledge of his philosophy in the United States. Nietzsche is known today as a precursor to existentialism, post-structuralism and postmodernism, while sociologists such as Jack Fong and Anas Karzai make visible Nietzsche's sociological breadth. W. B. Yeats and Arthur Symons described Nietzsche as the intellectual heir to William Blake. Symons went on to compare the ideas of the two thinkers in The Symbolist Movement in Literature, while Yeats tried to raise awareness of Nietzsche in Ireland. A similar notion was espoused by W. H. Auden who wrote of Nietzsche in his New Year Letter (released in 1941 in The Double Man): "O masterly debunker of our liberal fallacies ... all your life you stormed, like your English forerunner Blake." Nietzsche made an impact on composers during the 1890s. The writer Donald Mitchell noted that Gustav Mahler was "attracted to the poetic fire of Zarathustra, but repelled by the intellectual core of its writings". He also quoted Mahler himself, and adds that he was influenced by Nietzsche's conception and affirmative approach to nature, which Mahler presented in his Third Symphony using Zarathustra's roundelay. Frederick Delius produced a piece of choral music, A Mass of Life, based on a text of Thus Spoke Zarathustra, while Richard Strauss (who also based his Also sprach Zarathustra on the same book), was only interested in finishing "another chapter of symphonic autobiography". Writers and poets influenced by Nietzsche include André Gide, August Strindberg, Robinson Jeffers, Pío Baroja, D. H. Lawrence, Edith Södergran and Yukio Mishima.

Nietzsche was an early influence on the poetry of Rainer Maria Rilke. Knut Hamsun counted Nietzsche, along with Strindberg and Dostoyevsky, as his primary influences. The author Jack London wrote that he was more stimulated by Nietzsche than by any other writer. Critics have suggested that the character of David Grief in A Son of the Sun was based on Nietzsche. Nietzsche's influence on Muhammad Iqbal is most evidenced in Asrar-i Khudi (The Secrets of the Self). Wallace Stevens was another reader of Nietzsche, and elements of Nietzsche's philosophy were found throughout Stevens's poetry collection Harmonium. Olaf Stapledon was influenced by the idea of the Übermensch and it is a central theme in his books Odd John and Sirius. In Russia, Nietzsche influenced Russian symbolism and figures such as Dmitry Merezhkovsky, Andrei Bely, Vyacheslav Ivanov and Alexander Scriabin incorporated or discussed parts of Nietzsche philosophy in their works. Thomas Mann's novel Death in Venice shows a use of Apollonian and Dionysian, and in Doctor Faustus Nietzsche was a central source for the character of Adrian Leverkühn. Hermann Hesse, similarly, in his Narcissus and Goldmund presents two main characters as opposite yet intertwined Apollonian and Dionysian spirits. The painter Giovanni Segantini was fascinated by Thus Spoke Zarathustra, and he drew an illustration for the first Italian translation of the book. The Russian painter Lena Hades created the oil painting cycle Also Sprach Zarathustra dedicated to the book Thus Spoke Zarathustra.

By the time of the First World War Nietzsche had acquired a reputation as an inspiration for right-wing German militarism and leftist politics. German soldiers received copies of Thus Spoke Zarathustra as gifts during World War I. The Dreyfus affair provided a contrasting example of his reception: the French antisemitic Right labelled the Jewish and leftist intellectuals who defended Alfred Dreyfus as "Nietzscheans". Nietzsche had a distinct appeal for many Zionist thinkers around the start of the 20th century, most notable being Ahad Ha'am, Hillel Zeitlin, Micha Josef Berdyczewski, A.D. Gordon and Martin Buber, who went so far as to extol Nietzsche as a "creator" and "emissary of life". Chaim Weizmann, the first president of Israel, was a great admirer of Nietzsche; he sent Nietzsche's books to his wife, adding a comment in a letter that "This was the best and finest thing I can send to you." Israel Eldad, the ideological chief of the Stern Gang that fought the British in Palestine in the 1940s, wrote about Nietzsche in his underground newspaper and later translated most of Nietzsche's books into Hebrew. Eugene O'Neill remarked that Zarathustra influenced him more than any other book he ever read. He also shared Nietzsche's view of tragedy. The plays The Great God Brown and Lazarus Laughed are examples of Nietzsche's influence on him. The First International claimed Nietzsche as ideologically one of their own. From 1888 through the 1890s there were more publications of Nietzsche works in Russia than in any other country. Nietzsche was influential among the Bolsheviks. Among the Nietzschean Bolsheviks were Vladimir Bazarov, Anatoly Lunacharsky and Aleksandr Bogdanov. Nietzsche's influence on the works of the Frankfurt School philosophers Max Horkheimer and Theodor W. Adorno can be seen in the Dialectic of Enlightenment. Adorno encapsulated Nietzsche's philosophy as expressing the "humane in a world in which humanity has become a sham".

Nietzsche's growing prominence suffered a severe setback when his works became closely associated with Adolf Hitler and Nazi Germany. Many political leaders of the twentieth century were at least superficially familiar with Nietzsche's ideas, although it is not always possible to determine whether they actually read his work. It is debated among scholars whether Hitler read Nietzsche, although if he did, it may not have been extensively. (Note: Trevor-Roper, Hugh. [1972] 2008. "Introductory essay for 'Hitler's Table Talk 1941–1944 Secret Conversations'." In The Mind of Adolf Hitler. Enigma Books. p. xxxvii: "We know, from his [Hitler's] secretary, that he could quote Schopenhauer by the page, and the other German philosopher of willpower, Nietzsche, whose works he afterward presented to Mussolini, was often on his lips.") He was a frequent visitor to the Nietzsche museum in Weimar and used expressions of Nietzsche's, such as "lords of the earth" in Mein Kampf. The Nazis made selective use of Nietzsche's philosophy. Alfred Baeumler was perhaps the most notable exponent of Nietzschean thought in Nazi Germany. Baeumler had published his book "Nietzsche, Philosopher and Politician" in 1931, before the Nazis' rise to power, and subsequently published several editions of Nietzsche's work during the Third Reich. Benito Mussolini, Charles de Gaulle and Huey P. Newton read Nietzsche. Richard Nixon, the 37th president of the United States, read Nietzsche with "curious interest", and his book Beyond Peace might have taken its title from Nietzsche's book Beyond Good and Evil, which Nixon read beforehand. Bertrand Russell wrote that Nietzsche had exerted great influence on philosophers and on people of literary and artistic culture, but warned that the attempt to put Nietzsche's philosophy of aristocracy into practice could only be done by an organisation similar to the Fascist or the Nazi Party.

A decade after the Second World War there was a revival of Nietzsche's philosophical writings thanks to translations and analyses by Walter Kaufmann and R.J. Hollingdale. Georges Bataille was also influential in this revival, defending Nietzsche against appropriation by the Nazis with his notable 1937 essay "Nietzsche and Fascists". Others, well known philosophers in their own right, wrote commentaries on Nietzsche's philosophy, including Martin Heidegger, who produced a four-volume study, and Lev Shestov, who wrote a book called Dostoyevski, Tolstoy and Nietzsche, in which he portrays Nietzsche and Dostoevsky as the "thinkers of tragedy". Georg Simmel compares Nietzsche's importance to ethics to that of Nicolaus Copernicus for cosmology. The sociologist Ferdinand Tönnies read Nietzsche avidly from his early life, and later frequently discussed many of his concepts in his own works. Nietzsche has influenced philosophers such as Martin Heidegger, Jean-Paul Sartre, Oswald Spengler, George Grant, Emil Cioran, Albert Camus, Ayn Rand, Jacques Derrida, Sarah Kofman, Leo Strauss, Max Scheler, Michel Foucault, Bernard Williams and Nick Land.

Camus described Nietzsche as "the only artist to have derived the extreme consequences of an aesthetics of the absurd". Paul Ricœur called Nietzsche one of the masters of the "school of suspicion", alongside Karl Marx and Sigmund Freud. Carl Jung was also influenced by Nietzsche. In Memories, Dreams, Reflections, a biography transcribed by his secretary, he cites Nietzsche as a large influence. Aspects of Nietzsche's philosophy, especially his ideas of the self and his relation to society, run through much of late-twentieth and early twenty-first century thought. Nietzsche's writings have also been influential to some advancers of Accelerationist thought through his influence on Deleuze and Guattari. His deepening of the romantic-heroic tradition of the nineteenth century, for example, as expressed in the ideal of the "grand striver" appears in the work of thinkers from Cornelius Castoriadis to Roberto Mangabeira Unger. For Nietzsche, this grand striver overcomes obstacles, engages in epic struggles, pursues new goals, embraces recurrent novelty, and transcends existing structures and contexts.

== Works ==
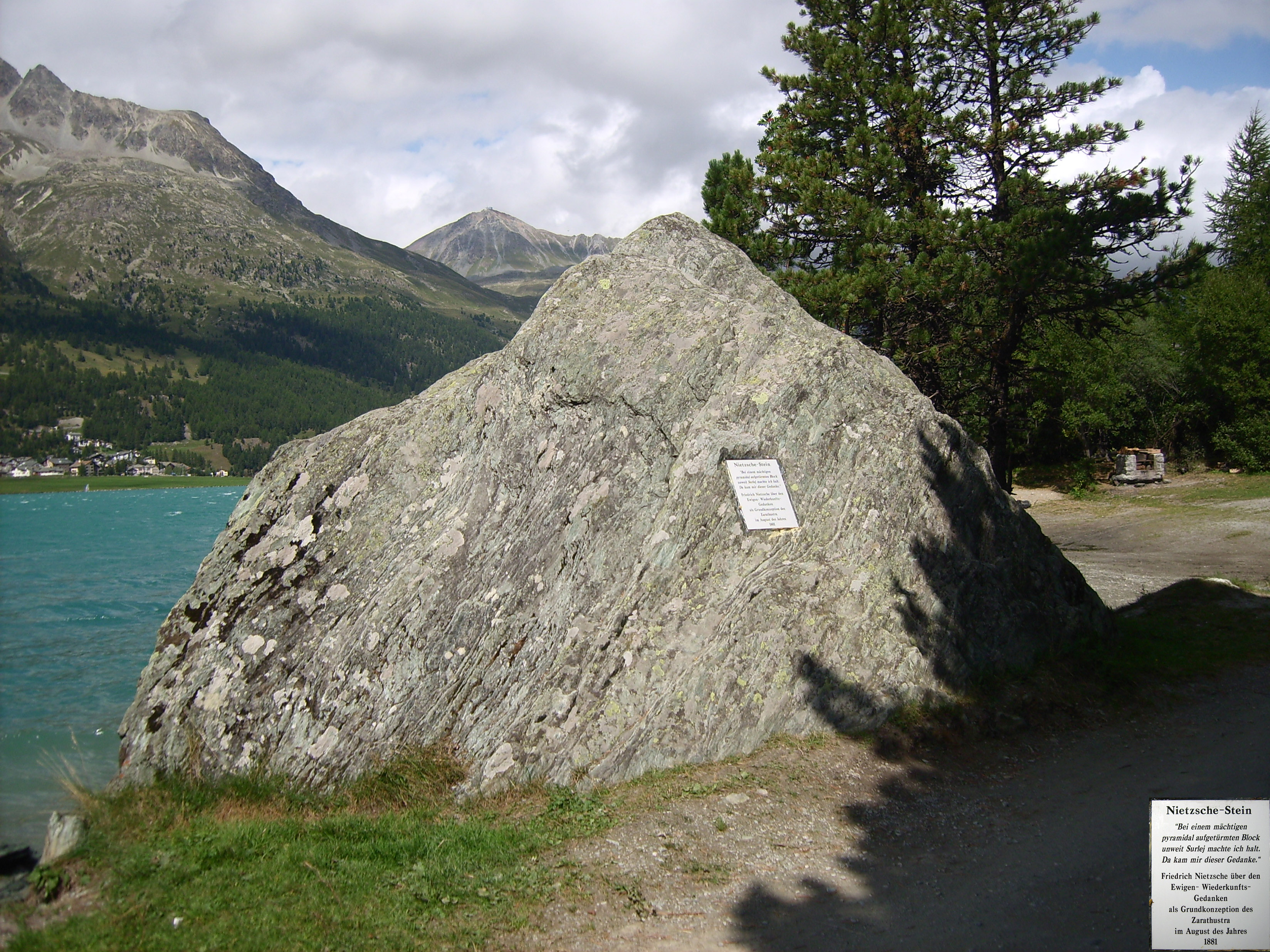
The Nietzsche Stone, near Surlej, the inspiration for Thus Spoke Zarathustra

- The Birth of Tragedy (1872)
- On Truth and Lies in a Nonmoral Sense (1873)
- Philosophy in the Tragic Age of the Greeks (1873, unfinished; first published in 1923)
- Untimely Meditations (1873–1876)
- Human, All Too Human (1878–1880)
- The Dawn (1881)
- The Gay Science (1882)
- Thus Spoke Zarathustra (1883–1885)
- Beyond Good and Evil (1886)
- On the Genealogy of Morality (1887)
- The Case of Wagner (1888)
- Twilight of the Idols (1888; first published in 1889)
- The Antichrist (1888; first published in 1895)
- Ecce Homo (1888; first published in 1908)
- Nietzsche contra Wagner (1888; first published in 1889)
- The Will to Power (various unpublished manuscripts edited by his sister Elisabeth; not recognised as a unified work after c. 1960)

== See also ==
- Transvaluation of values
- Nietzschean affirmation
- The Four Great Errors
- Master-slave morality
- Perspectivism
- Will to power
- Übermensch
- Zarathustra
- Amor fati
- Dionysus
