= Anaximander (disambiguation) =

Anaximander was an Ancient Greek philosopher.

Anaximander may also refer to:

== Places ==
- Anaximander crater on the Moon
- Anaximander Mountains, a submerged mountain range in the Hellenic Trench, Aegean Sea, Mediterranean
- Anaximander (31st) High School of Thessaloniki, Thessaloniki, Greece

== Other uses ==
- Anaximander (name), an Ancient Greek name, a derivative of Anax
- Anaximander (trilobite), a trilobite genus in the family Olenidae

== See also ==
- Papilio anaximander (P. anaximander), a butterfly
