= The Birth of Tragedy =

1872 book by Friedrich Nietzsche

The Birth of Tragedy Out of the Spirit of Music
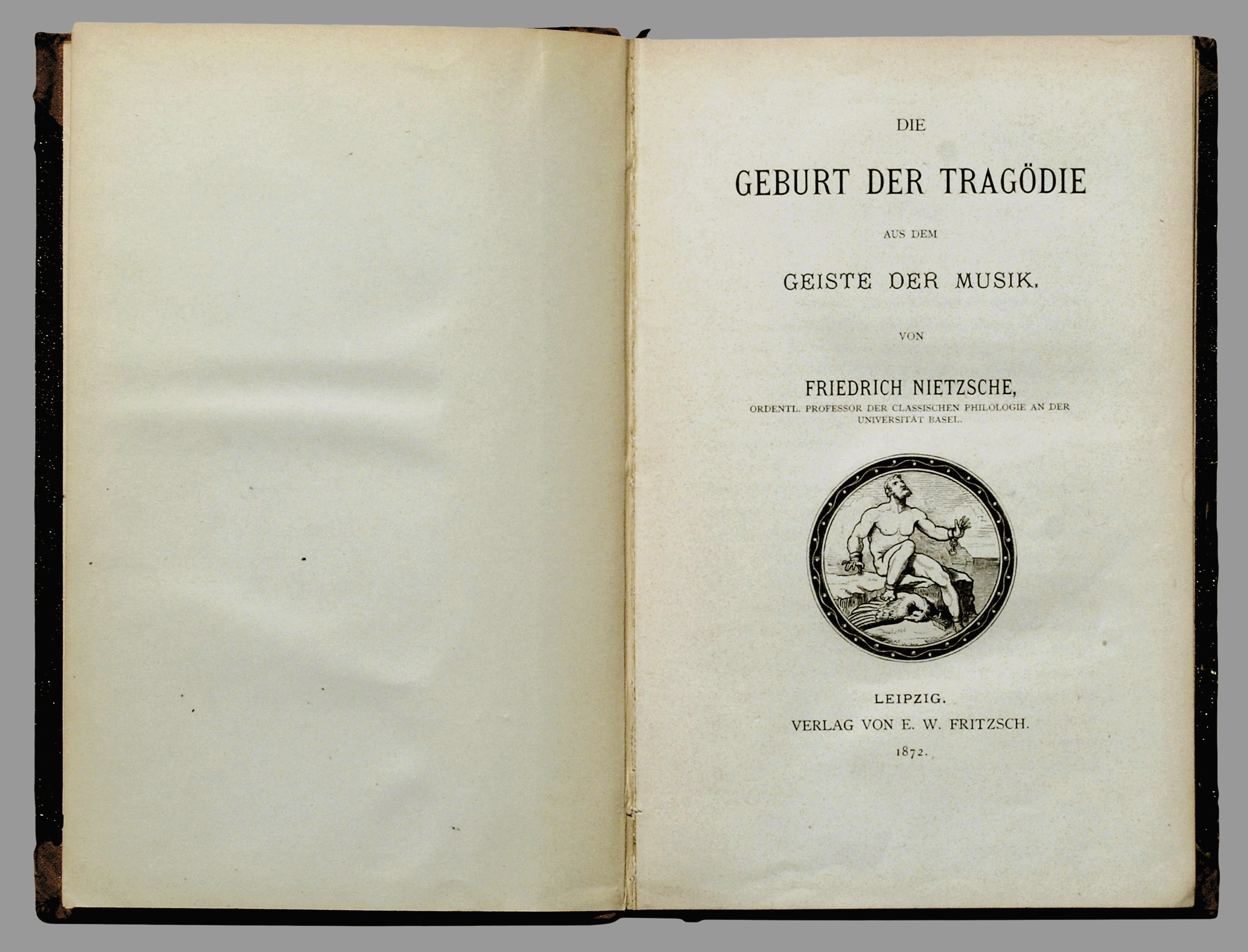
- The German first edition
- Author: Friedrich Nietzsche
- Original title: Die Geburt der Tragödie aus dem Geiste der Musik
- Language: German
- Subjects: Athenian tragedy; the Apollonian–Dionysian opposition
- Publisher: E. W. Fritzsch
- Publication date: 1872
- Media type: Print
- Pages: 143

The Birth of Tragedy Out of the Spirit of Music (German: Die Geburt der Tragödie aus dem Geiste der Musik) is an 1872 work of dramatic theory by the German philosopher Friedrich Nietzsche. It was reissued in 1886 as The Birth of Tragedy, Or: Hellenism and Pessimism (German: Die Geburt der Tragödie, Oder: Griechentum und Pessimismus). The later edition contained a prefatory essay, "An Attempt at Self-Criticism", wherein Nietzsche commented on this earlier book.

== Summary ==
Nietzsche found in classical Athenian tragedy an art form that transcended the pessimism and nihilism of a fundamentally meaningless world. Nietzsche (who was originally educated as a philologist) discusses the history of the tragic form and introduces an intellectual dichotomy between the Dionysian and the Apollonian (very loosely: reality as disordered and undifferentiated by forms versus reality as ordered and differentiated by forms). Nietzsche claims life always involves a struggle between these two elements, each battling for control over the existence of humanity. In Nietzsche's words, "Wherever the Dionysian prevailed, the Apollonian was checked and destroyed.... wherever the first Dionysian onslaught was successfully withstood, the authority and majesty of the Delphic god Apollo exhibited itself as more rigid and menacing than ever." And yet neither side ever prevails due to each containing the other in an eternal, natural check or balance.

Nietzsche argues that the tragedy of Ancient Greece was the highest form of art due to its mixture of both Apollonian and Dionysian elements into one seamless whole, allowing the spectator to experience the full spectrum of the human condition. The Dionysian element was to be found in the music of the chorus, while the Apollonian element was found in the dialogue which gave a concrete symbolism that balanced the Dionysian revelry. Basically, the Apollonian abstract forms were able to give shape to the passionate Dionysian experience.

Before the tragedy, there was an era of static, idealized plastic art in the form of sculpture that represented the Apollonian view of the world. The Dionysian element was to be found in the wild revelry of festivals and drunkenness, but, most importantly, in music. The combination of these elements in one art form gave birth to tragedy. He theorizes that the chorus was originally always satyrs, goat-men. (This is speculative, although the word “tragedy” τραγωδία is contracted from trag(o)-aoidiā = "goat song" from tragos = "goat" and aeidein = "to sing".) Thus, he argues, “the illusion of culture was wiped away by the primordial image of man” for the audience; they participated with and as the chorus empathetically, “so that they imagined themselves as restored natural geniuses, as satyrs.” But in this state, they have an Apollonian dream vision of themselves, of the energy they're embodying. It's a vision of the god, of Dionysus, who appears before the chorus on the stage. And the actors and the plot are the development of that dream vision, the essence of which is the ecstatic dismembering of the god and of the Bacchantes' rituals, of the inseparable ecstasy and suffering of human existence.

After the time of Aeschylus and Sophocles, there was an age where tragedy died. Nietzsche ties this to the influence of writers like Euripides and the coming of rationality, represented by Socrates. Euripides reduced the use of the chorus and was more naturalistic in his representation of human drama, making it more reflective of the realities of daily life. Socrates emphasized reason to such a degree that he diffused the value of myth and suffering to human knowledge. For Nietzsche, these two intellectuals helped drain the ability of the individual to participate in forms of art, because they saw things too soberly and rationally. The participation mystique aspect of art and myth was lost, and along with it, much of man's ability to live creatively in optimistic harmony with the sufferings of life. Nietzsche concludes that it may be possible to reattain the balance of Dionysian and Apollonian in modern art through the operas of Richard Wagner, in a rebirth of tragedy.

In contrast to the typical Enlightenment view of ancient Greek culture as noble, simple, elegant and grandiose, Nietzsche believed the Greeks were grappling with pessimism. The universe in which we live is the product of great interacting forces; but we neither observe nor know these as such. What we put together as our conceptions of the world, Nietzsche thought, never actually addresses the underlying realities. It is human destiny to be controlled by the darkest universal realities and, at the same time, to live life in a human-dreamt world of illusions.

The issue, then, says Nietzsche, is how to experience and understand the Dionysian side of life without destroying the obvious values of the Apollonian side. It is not healthy for an individual, or for a whole society, to become entirely absorbed in the rule of one or the other. The soundest (healthiest) footing involves both. Nietzsche's theory of Athenian tragic drama suggests exactly how, before Euripides and Socrates, the Dionysian and Apollonian elements of life were artistically woven together. The Greek spectator became healthy through direct experience of the Dionysian within the protective spirit-of-tragedy on the Apollonian stage.

== History ==
In January and February 1870, Nietzsche delivered two lectures about ancient Greek drama. After receiving copies of the lectures, his friends Richard and Cosima Wagner suggested that he write a book about the subject. In April 1871, he submitted a manuscript to publisher Wilhelm Engelmann. When Englemann was unresponsive, Nietzsche asked for the return of the manuscript in June. He had a portion of the book privately printed under the title Socrates and Greek Tragedy (German: Sokrates und griechische Tragödie) and sent it to friends. Richard Wagner received the first copy on 18 June.

In October 1871, Nietzsche submitted a revised manuscript to E. W. Fritzsch, who had published works by Wagner. Fritzsch accepted the book in November. Printing was completed at the end of December, and the book, now titled The Birth of Tragedy Out of the Spirit of Music (German: Die Geburt der Tragödie aus dem Geiste der Musik), reached bookstores on 2 January 1872. A second edition was printed by Fritzsch in 1874, but due to the publisher's financial problems, it was not bound until 1875 and had little circulation. In 1878, the remaining copies and publication rights for the first two editions were acquired by Nietzsche's new publisher, Ernst Schmeitzner.

By 1886, Nietzsche had fallen out with Schmeitzner, and Fritzsch had recovered from his financial difficulties. Fritzsch published a new edition in October 1886, retitled The Birth of Tragedy, Or: Hellenism and Pessimism (German: Die Geburt der Tragödie, Oder: Griechentum und Pessimismus), with an added prefatory essay by Nietzsche called "An Attempt at Self-Criticism", commenting on the earlier editions.

== Influences ==
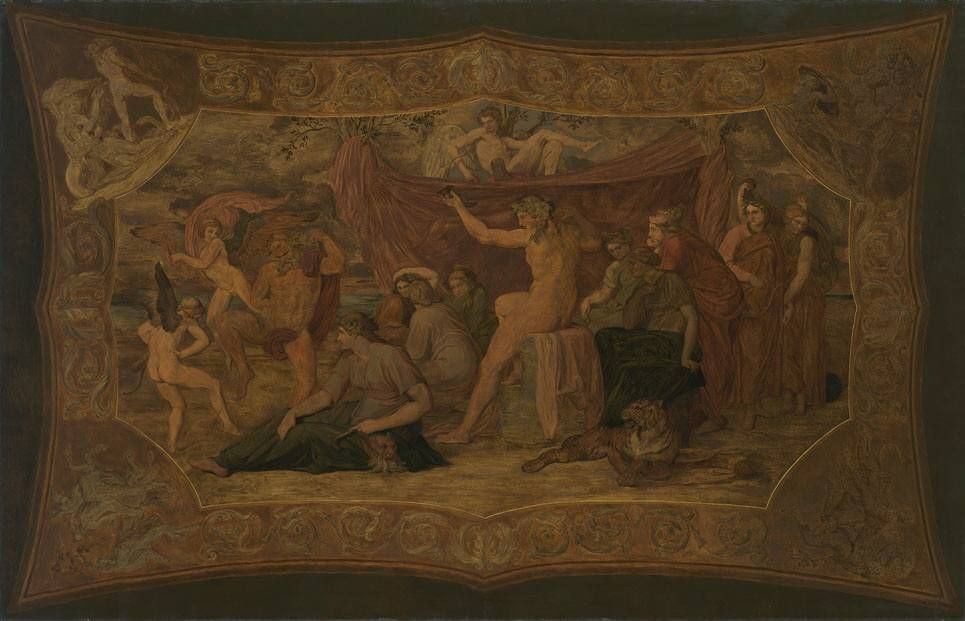
"Bacchus parmi les muses" by Bonaventura Genelli. This painting of Bacchus/Dionysus among the muses hung in Richard Wagner's drawing room in Tribschen and captured Nietzsche's attention on his stays there.

The Birth of Tragedy is a young man's work, and shows the influence of many of the philosophers Nietzsche had been studying. His interest in classical Greece as in some respects a rational society can be attributed in some measure to the influence of Johann Joachim Winckelmann, although Nietzsche departed from Winckelmann in many ways. In addition, Nietzsche uses the term "naïve" in exactly the sense used by Friedrich Schiller. Of great importance are the works of Arthur Schopenhauer, especially The World as Will and Representation. The Apollonian experience bears great similarity to the experience of the world as "representation" in Schopenhauer's sense, and the experience of the Dionysian bears similarities to the identification with the world as "will." Nietzsche opposed Schopenhauer's Buddhistic negation of the will. He argued that life is worth living despite the enormous amount of cruelty and suffering that exists.

One year before the publication of The Birth of Tragedy, Nietzsche wrote a fragment titled On Music and Words. In it he asserted the Schopenhauerian judgment that music is a primary expression of the essence of everything. Secondarily derivative are lyrical poetry and drama, which represent mere phenomenal appearances of objects. In this way, tragedy is born from music.

== Reception ==
The Birth of Tragedy was angrily criticized by many respected professional scholars of Greek literature. Particularly vehement was philologist Ulrich von Wilamowitz-Moellendorff, who denounced Nietzsche's work as slipshod and misleading. Prompted by Nietzsche, Erwin Rohde—a friend who had written a favorable review that sparked the first derogatory debate over the book—responded by exposing Wilamowitz-Moellendorf's inaccurate citations of Nietzsche's work. Richard Wagner also issued a response to Wilamowitz-Moellendorf's critique.

In his denunciation of The Birth of Tragedy, Wilamowitz says:

Herr N. ... is also a professor of classical philology; he treats a series of very important questions of Greek literary history. ... This is what I want to illuminate, and it is easy to prove that here also imaginary genius and impudence in the presentation of his claims stands in direct relation to his ignorance and lack of love of the truth. ... His solution is to belittle the historical-critical method, to scold any aesthetic insight which deviates from his own, and to ascribe a "complete misunderstanding of the study of antiquity" to the age in which philology in Germany, especially through the work of Gottfried Hermann and Karl Lachmann, was raised to an unprecedented height.

In suggesting the Greeks might have had problems, Nietzsche was departing from the scholarly traditions of his age, which viewed the Greeks as a happy, perhaps even naive, and simple people. The work is a web of professional philology, philosophical insight, and admiration of musical art. As a work in philology, it was almost immediately rejected, virtually destroying Nietzsche's academic aspirations. The music theme was so closely associated with Richard Wagner that it became an embarrassment to Nietzsche once he himself had achieved some distance and independence from Wagner. It stands, then, as Nietzsche's first complete, published philosophical work, one in which a battery of questions are asked, sketchily identified, and questionably answered.

Marianne Cowan, in her introduction to Nietzsche's Philosophy in the Tragic Age of the Greeks, describes the situation in these words:

The Birth of Tragedy presented a view of the Greeks so alien to the spirit of the time and to the ideals of its scholarship that it blighted Nietzsche's entire academic career. It provoked pamphlets and counter-pamphlets attacking him on the grounds of common sense, scholarship and sanity. For a time, Nietzsche, then a professor of classical philology at the University of Basel, had no students in his field. His lectures were sabotaged by German philosophy professors who advised their students not to show up for Nietzsche's courses.

By 1886, Nietzsche himself had reservations about the work, and he published a preface in the 1886 edition where he re-evaluated some of his main concerns and ideas in the text. In this post-script, Nietzsche referred to The Birth of Tragedy as "an impossible book... badly written, ponderous, embarrassing, image-mad and image-confused, sentimental, saccharine to the point of effeminacy, uneven in tempo, [and] without the will to logical cleanliness." Still, he defended the "arrogant and rhapsodic book" for inspiring "fellow-rhapsodizers" and for luring them on to "new secret paths and dancing places."

In 1888, in Ecce Homo, Nietzsche was once again radically defending his first work. He defends The Birth of Tragedy by stating: "...It is indifferent toward politics,—'un-German,' to use the language of the present time—it smells offensively Hegelian, and the cadaverous perfume of Schopenhauer sticks only to a few formulas. An 'idea'—the antithesis of the Dionysian and the Apollinian—translated into the metaphysical; history itself as the development of this 'idea'; in tragedy this antithesis is sublimated into a unity; under this perspective things that had never before faced each other are suddenly juxtaposed, used to illuminate each other, and comprehended... Opera, for example, and the revolution.— The two decisive innovations of the book are, first, its understanding of the Dionysian phenomenon among the Greeks: for the first time, a psychological analysis of this phenomenon is offered, and it is considered as one root of the whole of Greek art. The other is the understanding of Socratism: Socrates is recognized for the first time as an instrument of Greek disintegration, as a typical décadent. 'Rationality' against instinct. 'Rationality' at any price as a dangerous force that undermines life!— Profound, hostile silence about Christianity throughout the book. That is neither Apollinian nor Dionysian; it negates all aesthetic values—the only values that the 'Birth of Tragedy' recognizes: it is nihilistic in the most profound sense, while in the Dionysian symbol the ultimate limit of affirmation is attained. There is one allusion [The Birth of Tragedy, 24] to Christian priests as a 'vicious kind of dwarfs' who are 'subterranean' ..."

In the title of his novel The Magic Mountain, Thomas Mann alludes to a passage from The Birth of Tragedy, and the influence of Nietzsche's work can be seen in the novel's character Mynheer Peepercorn, who embodies the "Dionysian principle".

Within the context of a critical study of Nietzsche's "atheist humanism", the influential Catholic theologian Henri de Lubac considered it "a work of genius", and dedicated several pages of his study to explicate the relationship between Nietzsche's early thought and Christianity.

== See also ==
- Greek tragedy – Form of theatre from Ancient Greece
