= Edwin Carpenter =

Edwin Carpenter may refer to:

- Edwin Francis Carpenter (1898–1963), American astronomer
- Edwin Clarendon Carpenter (1845–1920), Ontario farmer and political figure
