= 1852 Carpenter =

Main-belt asteroid

Discovery
- Discovered by: Indiana University (Indiana Asteroid Program)
- Discovery site: Goethe Link Obs.
- Discovery date: 1 April 1955

Designations
- Named after: Edwin Carpenter (American astronomer)
- Alternative designations: 1955 GA · 1931 TT_{2} 1937 WH · 1939 FK
- Minor planet category: main-belt · Eos

Orbital characteristics
- Epoch 27 April 2019 (JD 2458600.5)
- Uncertainty parameter 0
- Observation arc: 87.87 yr (32,094 d)
- Aphelion: 3.2004 AU
- Perihelion: 2.8329 AU
- Semi-major axis: 3.0167 AU
- Eccentricity: 0.0609
- Orbital period (sidereal): 5.24 yr (1,914 d)
- Mean anomaly: 194.18°
- Mean motion: 0° 11^{m} 17.16^{s} / day
- Inclination: 11.197°
- Longitude of ascending node: 95.338°
- Argument of perihelion: 353.15°

Physical characteristics
- Mean diameter: 21.378±0.208; 22.9 km
- Geometric albedo: 0.1224±0.024; 0.128±0.025
- Absolute magnitude (H): 11.3

1852 Carpenter, provisional designation 1955 GA, is an Eoan asteroid from the outer regions of the asteroid belt, approximately 20 kilometers in diameter. The asteroid was discovered on 1 April 1955, by the Indiana Asteroid Program at Goethe Link Observatory near Brooklyn, Indiana, United States.

== Description ==
Carpenter is a core member of the Eos family (606), the largest asteroid family in the outer main belt consisting of nearly 10,000 asteroids. It orbits the Sun in the outer main-belt at a distance of 2.8–3.2 AU once every 5 years and 3 months (1,913 days). Its orbit has an eccentricity of 0.06 and an inclination of 11° with respect to the ecliptic.

This minor planet was named after American astronomer Edwin Francis Carpenter (1898–1963), second director of the Steward Observatory who researched spectroscopic binaries and interacting galaxies. He played a major role in enabling the construction of the Kitt Peak National Observatory. The official naming citation was published by the Minor Planet Center on 1 April 1980 (M.P.C. 5282).
