= Carpenter (crater) =

Lunar impact crater

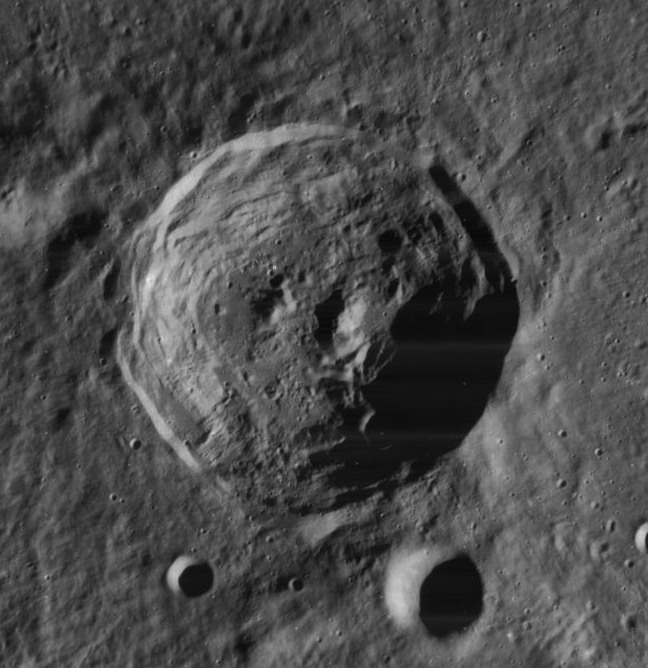
- Lunar Orbiter 4 image
- Coordinates: 69.4°N 50.9°W
- Diameter: 59.06 km (36.70 mi)
- Depth: 4.32 km (2.68 mi)
- Colongitude: 46° at sunrise
- Eponym: James Carpenter; Edwin F. Carpenter

Carpenter is a lunar impact crater in the northern part of the Moon, relatively close to the limb (as viewed from earth). At this position the crater is foreshortened and appears oval in shape. It is, however, very nearly circular in outline. The outer rampart to the south is adjoined to the old crater Anaximander, and the satellite formation Anaximander B lies along the western rim. To the northeast is Anaximenes.

In geological terms Carpenter is a somewhat young lunar crater, with features that have not been significantly eroded by subsequent impacts. Certainly it is much younger than the surrounding crater formations. The inner wall displays an appearance of slumping, particularly along the eastern face, and there is some development of terraces. The outer rim is unmarked by craterlets of note, but there is a small crater along the south-southeastern inner wall.

The crater has a purported ray system, and is consequently mapped as part of the Copernican System. However, this may be a misclassification since a ray from a small crater crosses Carpenter. This younger crater appears older than Copernicus.

The interior floor within the sloping inner walls is generally level, but irregular with many small bumps and hills. Near the midpoint is an unusual double central peak formation, with a smaller peak offset to the west and a larger ridge offset to the east. The latter ridge runs southward to the edge of the inner wall. The spectra of the central peak fits a noritic anorthosite mineralogy, which originated from a depth of 5.9 to 9.0 km. The infrared spectrum of pure crystalline plagioclase has been identified on the floor and the east and west walls.

This crater is named for British astronomer James Carpenter (1840-1899) and American astronomer Edwin F. Carpenter (1898-1963). Its designation was officially adopted by the International Astronomical Union in 1935.

== Satellite craters ==
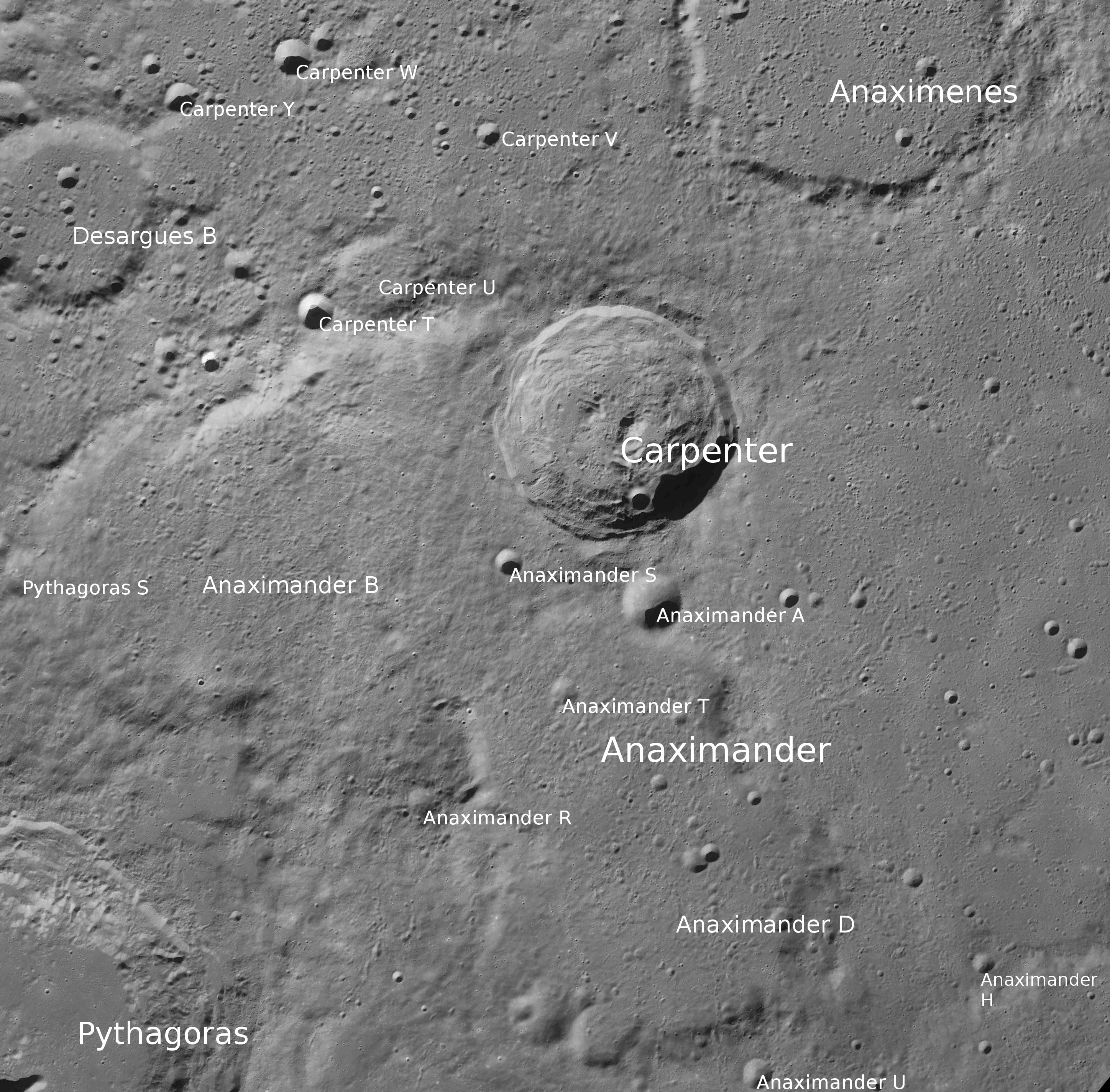
Carpenter surroundings, including satellite features

By convention these features are identified on lunar maps by placing the letter on the side of the crater midpoint that is closest to Carpenter.

Carpenter	Latitude	Longitude	Diameter
T	70.2° N	58.3° W	9 km
U	70.6° N	57.0° W	26 km
V	71.8° N	54.1° W	6 km
W	72.3° N	59.8° W	10 km
Y	71.9° N	62.7° W	9 km
