= James Carpenter (astronomer) =

British astronomer (1840–1899)

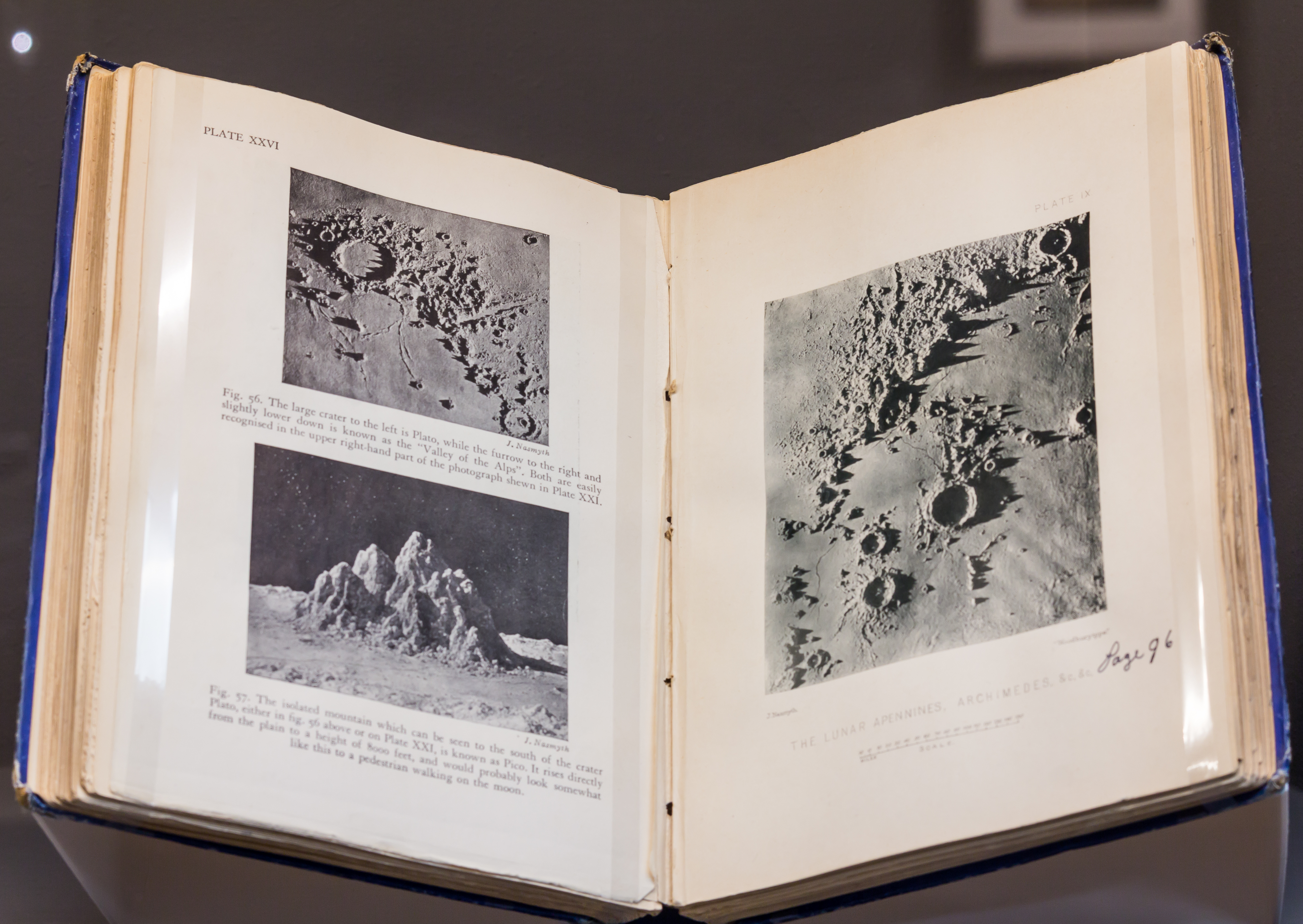
The moon considered as a planet, a world and a satellite

James Carpenter (1840–1899) was a British astronomer at the Royal Observatory in Greenwich. During the 1860s he performed the first observations of stellar spectra at the observatory, under the direction of the Astronomer Royal George Airy. In 1861–62 he was one of three astronomers to successfully observe the dark underside of the rings of Saturn, the other two astronomers being William Wray and Otto Struve.

In 1871, the engineer James Nasmyth partnered with James Carpenter to produce a book about the Moon titled, The Moon: Considered as a Planet, a World, and a Satellite. This work was illustrated by photographs of plaster models representing the lunar surface, with the illumination from various angles. The result was more realistic images of the lunar surface than could be achieved by telescope photography during that period. The authors were proponents for a volcanic origin of the craters, a theory that was later proved incorrect.

The crater Carpenter on the Moon is jointly named after him and Edwin Francis Carpenter.
