= Ethel Grace Stiffler =

American botanist

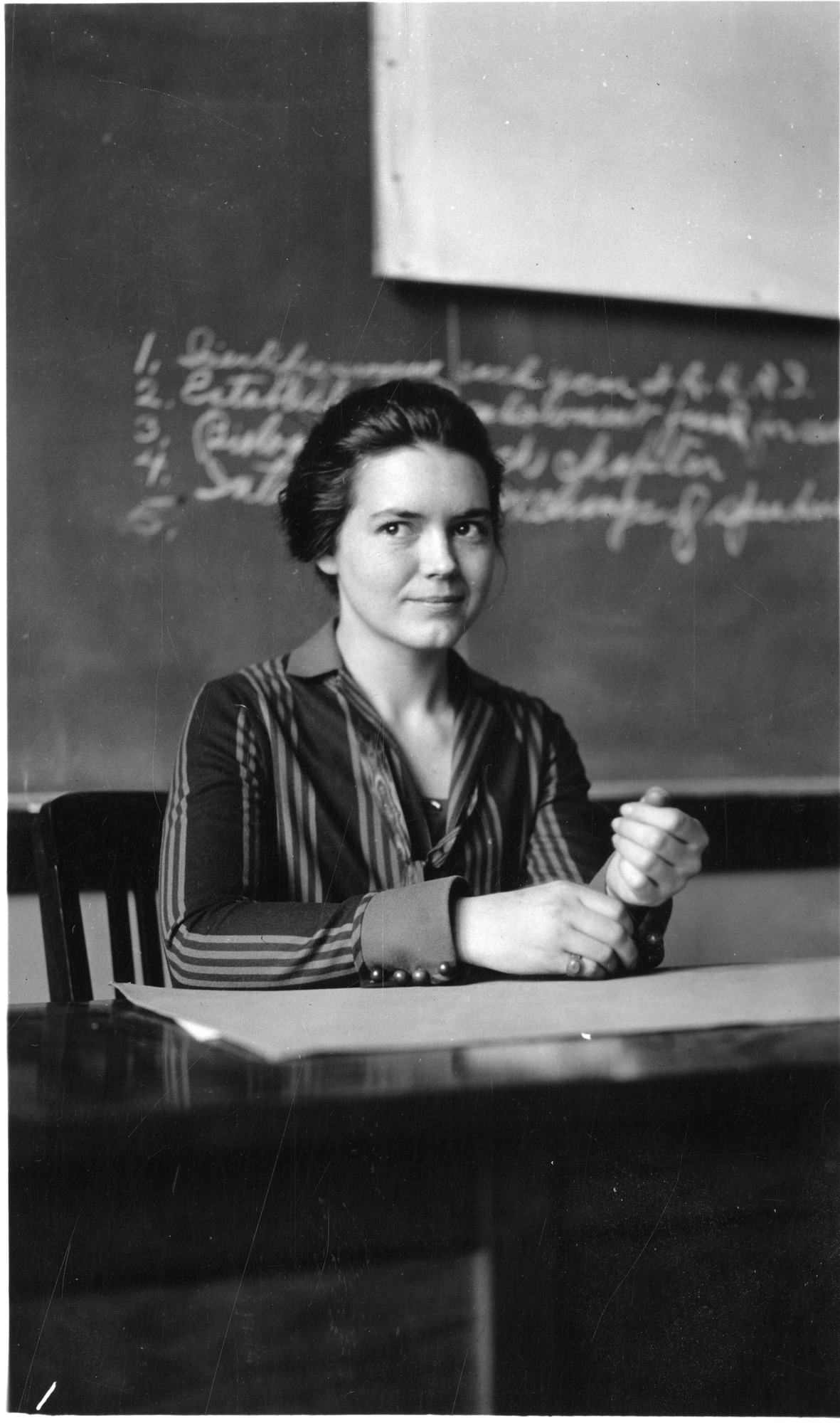
- Ethel Grace Stiffler, photographed by Julian P. Scott
- Born: September 8, 1899; Parkton, Maryland, U.S.
- Died: February 9, 1995 (age 95); Tucson, Arizona, U.S.
- Occupations: Botanist, college professor
- Spouse: Edwin Francis Carpenter

Ethel Grace Stiffler Carpenter (September 8, 1899 – February 9, 1995) was an American botanist and college instructor; she studied the desert plants of the American Southwest. She is best known today for her personal writings and photographs, documenting life in Tucson in the 1920s and 1930s.

== Early life and education ==
Stiffler was born in Parkton, Maryland, the daughter of Jacob Clemm Stiffler and Bertha Cross Stiffler. Her father owned a general store and was the town's postmaster. She graduated from Goucher College with a bachelor's degree in 1922, and earned a master's degree from the University of Pennsylvania in 1924. She held a graduate fellowship in botany at Cornell University in 1927 and 1928.

== Career ==
Stiffler taught botany at the University of Arizona from 1925 to 1927. She taught at Wilson College in Pennsylvania and American University in Washington, D.C., for a few years, then returned to Tucson in 1933. She could not return to university teaching after marriage, but was active in campus life as a faculty wife, and in the Town and Gown Club.

== Publications ==
Stiffler's almost daily letters from Arizona to her mother in Maryland and her photographs were collected after her death into two published volumes, edited by her son. They are considered a rich source on life at the University of Arizona in the 1920s and 1930s.

- Letters from Tucson, 1925–1927
- Letters from Tucson, 1933–1942

== Personal life ==
Stiffler married widowed astronomer Edwin Francis Carpenter in 1933. They had two children, Roger and Emily. The family lived in New York state during World War II. Her husband died in 1963, and she died in 1995, at the age of 95, in Tucson. There is a collection of her papers, including correspondence and photographs, in the Arizona Historical Society.
