= Anaximander (crater) =

Crater on the Moon

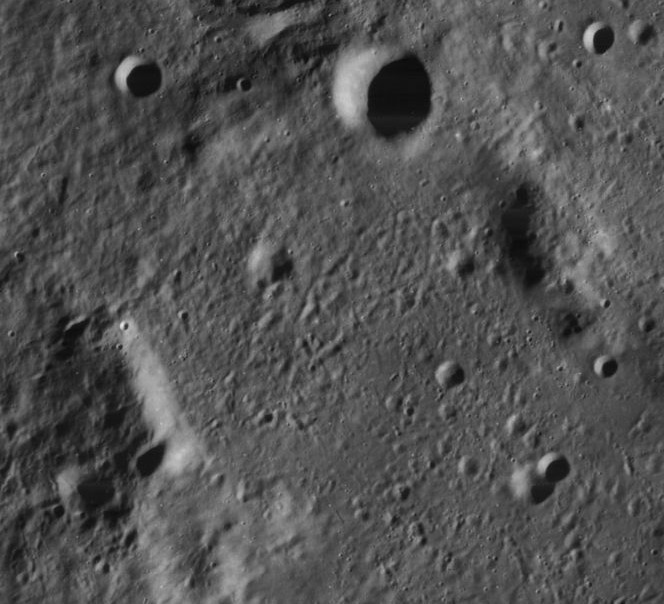
- Oblique Lunar Orbiter 4 image
- Coordinates: 66.97°N 51.44°W
- Diameter: 68.71 km
- Depth: 2.4 km
- Colongitude: 52° at sunrise
- Eponym: Anaximander

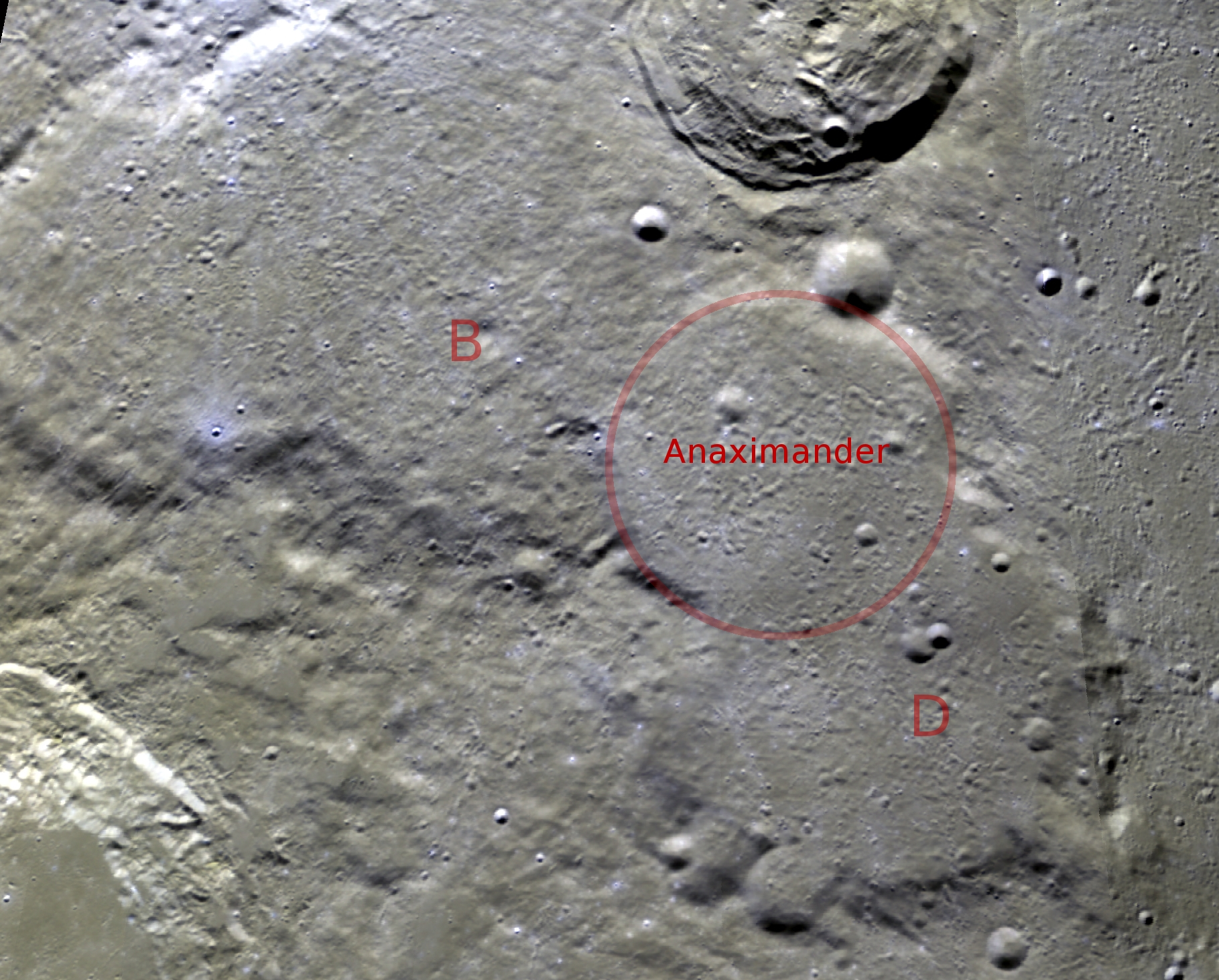
Anaximander crater and the largest two satellite craters

Anaximander is a lunar impact crater that is located near the northwest limb of the Moon. It is joined at the northern rim by the crater Carpenter, a younger and better-defined formation. To the southeast is the much larger J. Herschel, a formation of the variety known as a walled plain.

The outer wall of Anaximander is heavily worn and eroded, with multiple notches and breaks. There is no central peak, but the floor contains several small craterlets and a multitude of tiny pits from minor impacts. This crater has merged with the larger Anaximander D to the south, and there is a wide break in their common rims where they have joined. To the northwest a low rise in the surface is all that separated Anaximander from the much larger satellite crater Anaximander B.

The crater is named for the 6th century BCE Greek philosopher and astronomer Anaximander. Its designation was formally adopted by the International Astronomical Union in 1935. The name was introduced into lunar nomenclature in 1651 by Giovanni Ricciolli.

== Satellite craters ==
By convention these features are identified on lunar maps by placing the letter on the side of the crater midpoint that is closest to Anaximander.

Anaximander	Latitude	Longitude	Diameter
A	68.0° N	50.2° W	16 km
B	67.8° N	60.7° W	78 km
D	65.4° N	50.1° W	92 km
H	65.2° N	40.8° W	9 km
R	66.2° N	54.9° W	8 km
S	68.3° N	53.4° W	7 km
T	67.2° N	52.0° W	7 km
U	64.1° N	48.3° W	8 km
