= Anaximander =

Ancient Greek philosopher (c. 610 – c. 546 BC)

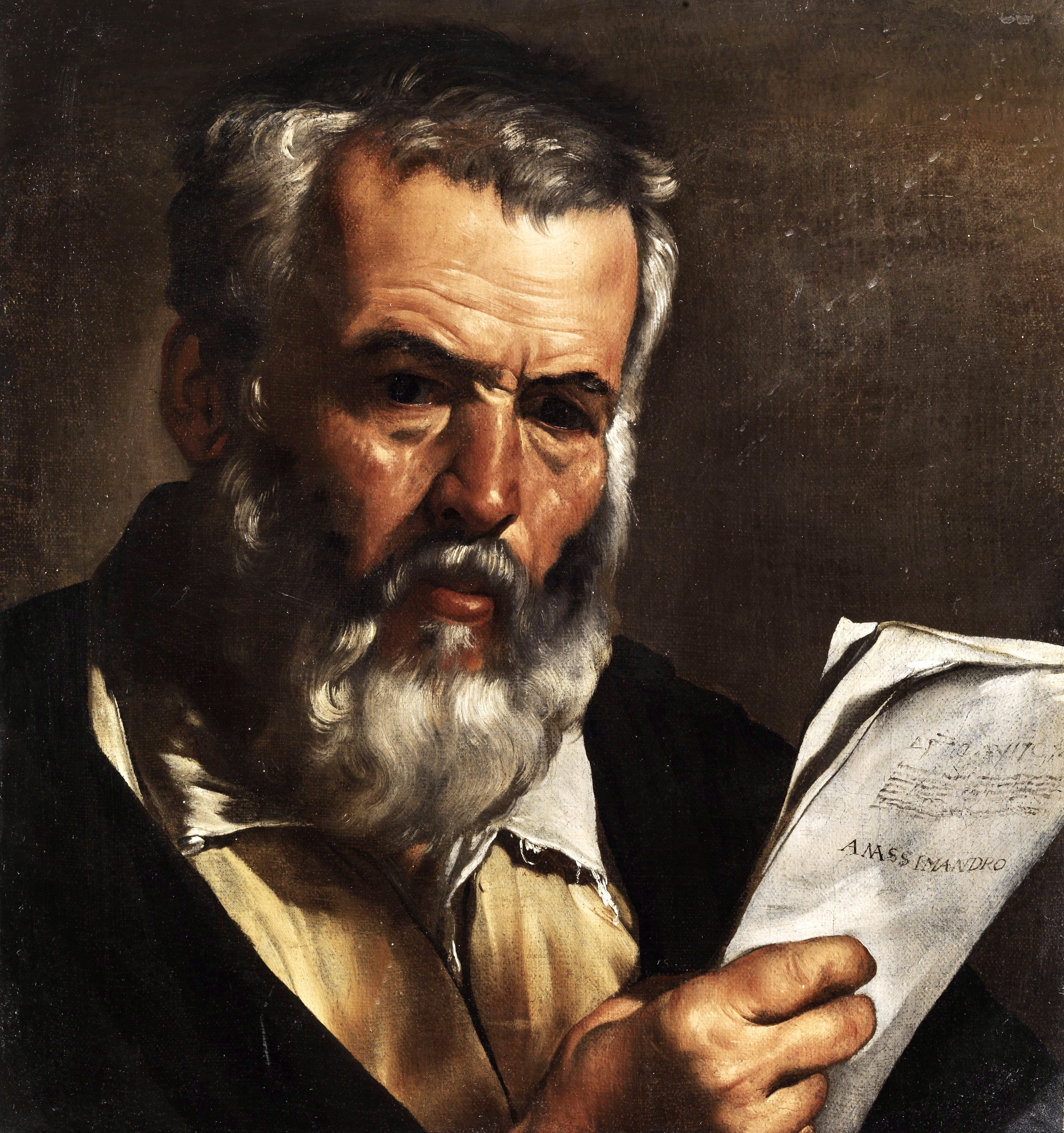
- Anaximander in a 17th century portrait by Pietro Bellotti
- Born: c. 610 BC; Miletus, Ionian League
- Died: c. 546 BC (aged c. 64)

Philosophical work
- Era: Pre-Socratic philosophy
- Region: Western philosophy
- School: Ionian/Milesian; Naturalism
- Main interests: Metaphysics, astronomy, geometry, geography
- Notable ideas: The apeiron is the arche Evolutionary view of life Earth floats unsupported Mechanical model of the sky Rain is from evaporation World map

Anaximander (/æˌnæksɪˈmændər/ an-AK-sih-MAN-dər; Ancient Greek: Ἀναξίμανδρος Anaximandros; c. 610 – c. 546 BC) was a pre-Socratic Greek philosopher who lived in Miletus, a city of Ionia (in modern-day Turkey). He belonged to the Milesian school and learned the teachings of his master Thales. He succeeded Thales and became the second master of that school, where he counted Anaximenes and, arguably, Pythagoras amongst his pupils.

Little of his life and work is known today. According to available historical documents, he is the first philosopher known to have written down his studies, although only one fragment of his work remains. Fragmentary testimonies found in documents after his death provide a portrait of the man.

Anaximander was an early proponent of science and tried to observe and explain different aspects of the universe, with a particular interest in its origins, claiming that nature is ruled by laws, just like human societies, and anything that disturbs the balance of nature does not last long. Like many thinkers of his time, Anaximander's philosophy included contributions to many disciplines. In astronomy, he attempted to describe the mechanics of celestial bodies in relation to the Earth. In physics, his postulation that the infinite (or apeiron) was the source of all things, led Greek philosophy to a new level of conceptual abstraction. His knowledge of geometry allowed him to introduce the gnomon in Greece. He created a map of the world that contributed greatly to the advancement of geography. Anaximander was involved in the politics of Miletus and was sent as a leader to one of its colonies.

== Biography ==
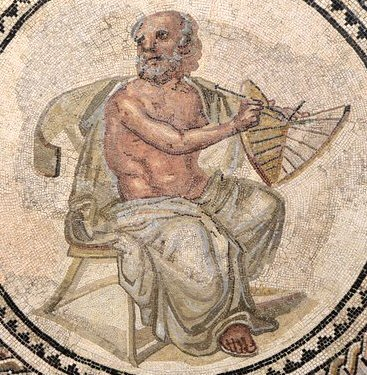
Ancient Roman mosaic from Johannisstraße, Trier, dating to the early third century AD, showing Anaximander holding a sundial

Anaximander, son of Praxiades, was born in the third year of the 42nd Olympiad (610 BC). According to Apollodorus of Athens, Greek grammarian of the 2nd century BC, he was sixty-four years old during the second year of the 58th Olympiad (547–546 BC) and died shortly afterwards.

Establishing a timeline of his work is impossible, since no document provides chronological references. Themistius, a 4th-century Byzantine rhetorician, mentions that he was the "first of the known Greeks to publish a written document on nature." Therefore, his texts would be amongst the earliest written in prose, at least in the Western world. By the time of Plato, his philosophy was almost forgotten, and Aristotle, his successor Theophrastus, and a few doxographers provide us with the little information that remains. However, we know from Aristotle that Thales, also from Miletus, precedes Anaximander. It is debatable whether Thales actually was the teacher of Anaximander, but there is no doubt that Anaximander was influenced by Thales' theory that everything is derived from water. One thing that is not debatable is that even the ancient Greeks considered Anaximander to be from the Monist school which began in Miletus, with Thales followed by Anaximander and which ended with Anaximenes. 3rd-century Roman rhetorician Aelian depicts Anaximander as leader of the Milesian colony to Apollonia on the Black Sea coast, and hence some have inferred that he was a prominent citizen. Indeed, Various History (III, 17) explains that philosophers sometimes also dealt with political matters. It is very likely that leaders of Miletus sent him there as a legislator to create a constitution or simply to maintain the colony's allegiance.

Anaximander lived the final few years of his life as a subject of the Persian Achaemenid Empire.

== Theories ==
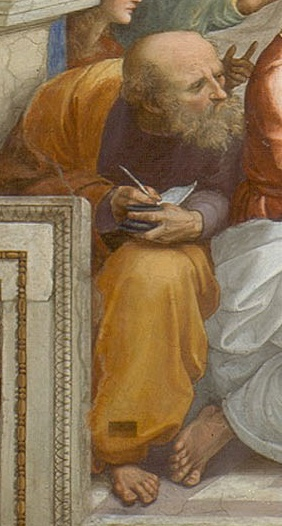
Detail of Raphael's painting The School of Athens, 1510–1511. This could be a representation of Anaximander leaning towards Pythagoras on his left.

Anaximander's theories were influenced by the Greek mythical tradition, and by some ideas of Thales – the father of Western philosophy – as well as by observations made by older civilizations in the Near East, especially Babylon. All these were developed rationally. In his desire to find some universal principle, he assumed, like traditional religion, the existence of a cosmic order; and his ideas on this used the old language of myths which ascribed divine control to various spheres of reality. This was a common practice for the Greek philosophers in a society which saw gods everywhere, and therefore could fit their ideas into a tolerably elastic system.

Some scholars see a gap between the existing mythical and the new rational way of thought which is the main characteristic of the archaic period (8th to 6th century BC) in the Greek city-states. This has given rise to the phrase "Greek miracle". But there may not have been such an abrupt break as initially appears. The basic elements of nature (water, air, fire, earth) which the first Greek philosophers believed made up the universe in fact represent the primordial forces imagined in earlier ways of thinking. Their collision produced what the mythical tradition had called cosmic harmony. In the old cosmogonies – Hesiod (8th – 7th century BC) and Pherecydes (6th century BC) – Zeus establishes his order in the world by destroying the powers which were threatening this harmony (the Titans). Anaximander claimed that the cosmic order is not monarchic but geometric, and that this causes the equilibrium of the Earth, which is lying in the centre of the universe. This is the projection on nature of a new political order and a new space organized around a centre which is the static point of the system in the society as in nature. In this space there is isonomy (equal rights) and all the forces are symmetrical and transferable. The decisions are now taken by the assembly of demos in the agora which is lying in the middle of the city.

The same rational way of thought led him to introduce the abstract apeiron (indefinite, infinite, boundless, unlimited) as an origin of the universe, a concept that is probably influenced by the original Chaos (gaping void, abyss, formless state) from which everything else appeared in the mythical Greek cosmogony. It also takes notice of the mutual changes between the four elements. Origin, then, must be something else unlimited in its source, that could create without experiencing decay, so that genesis would never stop.

=== Apeiron ===
The Refutation attributed to Hippolytus of Rome (I, 5), and the later 6th century Byzantine philosopher Simplicius of Cilicia, attribute to Anaximander the earliest use of the word apeiron (ἄπειρον "infinite" or "limitless") to designate the original principle. He was the first philosopher to employ, in a philosophical context, the term archē (ἀρχή), which until then had meant beginning or origin.

"That Anaximander called this something by the name of Φύσις is the natural interpretation of what Theophrastos says; the current statement that the term ἀρχή was introduced by him appears to be due to a misunderstanding."

And "Hippolytos, however, is not an independent authority, and the only question is what Theophrastos wrote."

For him, it became no longer a mere point in time, but a source that could perpetually give birth to whatever will be. The indefiniteness is spatial in early usages as in Homer (indefinite sea) and as in Xenophanes (6th century BC) who said that the Earth went down indefinitely (to apeiron) i.e. beyond the imagination or concept of men.

Burnet (1930) in Early Greek Philosophy says:

"Nearly all we know of Anaximander's system is derived in the last resort from Theophrastos, who certainly knew his book. He seems once at least to have quoted Anaximander's own words, and he criticised his style. Here are the remains of what he said of him in the First Book:

"Anaximander of Miletos, son of Praxiades, a fellow-citizen and associate of Thales, said that the material cause and first element of things was the Infinite, he being the first to introduce this name of the material cause. He says it is neither water nor any other of the so-called elements, but a substance different from them which is infinite" [apeiron, or ἄπειρον] "from which arise all the heavens and the worlds within them.—Phys, Op. fr. 2 (Dox. p. 476; R. P. 16)."

Burnet's quote from the "First Book" is his translation of Theophrastos' Physic Opinion fragment 2 as it appears in p. 476 of Historia Philosophiae Graecae (1898) by Ritter and Preller and section 16 of Doxographi Graeci (1879) by Diels.

By ascribing the "Infinite" with a "material cause", Theophrastos is following the Aristotelian tradition of "nearly always discussing the facts from the point of view of his own system".

Aristotle writes (Metaphysics, I.III 3–4) that the Pre-Socratics were searching for the element that constitutes all things. While each pre-Socratic philosopher gave a different answer as to the identity of this element (water for Thales and air for Anaximenes), Anaximander understood the beginning or first principle to be an endless, unlimited primordial mass (apeiron), subject to neither old age nor decay, that perpetually yielded fresh materials from which everything we perceive is derived. He proposed the theory of the apeiron in direct response to the earlier theory of his teacher, Thales, who had claimed that the primary substance was water. The notion of temporal infinity was familiar to the Greek mind from remote antiquity in the religious concept of immortality, and Anaximander's description was in terms appropriate to this conception. This archē is called "eternal and ageless". (Hippolytus (?), Refutation, I, 6, I;DK B2)

"Aristotle puts things in his own way regardless of historical considerations, and it is difficult to see that it is more of an anachronism to call the Boundless " intermediate between the elements " than to say that it is " distinct from the elements." Indeed, if once we introduce the elements at all, the former description is the more adequate of the two. At any rate, if we refuse to understand these passages as referring to Anaximander, we shall have to say that Aristotle paid a great deal of attention to some one whose very name has been lost, and who not only agreed with some of Anaximander's views, but also used some of his most characteristic expressions. We may add that in one or two places Aristotle certainly seems to identify the " intermediate " with the something " distinct from " the elements."

"It is certain that he [Anaximander] cannot have said anything about elements, which no one thought of before Empedokles, and no one could think of before Parmenides. The question has only been mentioned because it has given rise to a lengthy controversy, and because it throws light on the historical value of Aristotle's statements. From the point of view of his own system, these may be justified; but we shall have to remember in other cases that, when he seems to attribute an idea to some earlier thinker, we are not bound to take what he says in an historical sense."

For Anaximander, the principle of things, the constituent of all substances, is nothing determined and not an element such as water in Thales' view. Neither is it something halfway between air and water, or between air and fire, thicker than air and fire, or more subtle than water and earth. Anaximander argues that water cannot embrace all of the opposites found in nature – for example, water can only be wet, never dry – and therefore cannot be the one primary substance; nor could any of the other candidates. He postulated the apeiron as a substance that, although not directly perceptible to us, could explain the opposites he saw around him.

"If Thales had been right in saying that water was the fundamental reality, it would not be easy to see how anything else could ever have existed. One side of the opposition, the cold and moist, would have had its way unchecked, and the warm and dry would have been driven from the field long ago. We must, then, have something not itself one of the warring opposites, something more primitive, out of which they arise, and into which they once more pass away."

Anaximander explains how the four elements of ancient physics (air, earth, water and fire) are formed, and how Earth and terrestrial beings are formed through their interactions. Unlike other Pre-Socratics, he never defines this principle precisely, and it has generally been understood (e.g., by Aristotle and by Saint Augustine) as a sort of primal chaos. According to him, the Universe originates in the separation of opposites in the primordial matter. It embraces the opposites of hot and cold, wet and dry, and directs the movement of things; an entire host of shapes and differences then grow that are found in "all the worlds" (for he believed there were many).

"Anaximander taught, then, that there was an eternal. The indestructible something out of which everything arises, and into which everything returns; a boundless stock from which the waste of existence is continually made good, "elements.". That is only the natural development of the thought we have ascribed to Thales, and there can be no doubt that Anaximander at least formulated it distinctly. Indeed, we can still follow to some extent the reasoning which led him to do so. Thales had regarded water as the most likely thing to be that of which all others are forms; Anaximander appears to have asked how the primary substance could be one of these particular things. His argument seems to be preserved by Aristotle, who has the following passage in his discussion of the Infinite: "Further, there cannot be a single, simple body which is infinite, either, as some hold, one distinct from the elements, which they then derive from it, or without this qualification. For there are some who make this. (i.e. a body distinct from the elements). the infinite, and not air or water, in order that the other things may not be destroyed by their infinity. They are in opposition one to another. air is cold, water moist, and fire hot. and therefore, if any one of them were infinite, the rest would have ceased to be by this time. Accordingly they say that what is infinite is something other than the elements, and from it the elements arise.'—Aristotle Physics. F, 5 204 b 22 (Ritter and Preller (1898) Historia Philosophiae Graecae, section 16 b)."

Anaximander maintains that all dying things are returning to the element from which they came (apeiron). The one surviving fragment of Anaximander's writing deals with this matter. Simplicius transmitted it as a quotation, which describes the balanced and mutual changes of the elements:

Whence things have their origin,
Thence also their destruction happens,
According to necessity;
For they give to each other justice and recompense
For their injustice
In conformity with the ordinance of Time.

Simplicius mentions that Anaximander said all these "in poetic terms", meaning that he used the old mythical language. The goddess Justice (Dike) keeps the cosmic order. This concept of returning to the element of origin was often revisited afterwards, notably by Aristotle, and by the Greek tragedian Euripides: "what comes from earth must return to earth." Friedrich Nietzsche, in his Philosophy in the Tragic Age of the Greeks, stated that Anaximander viewed "... all coming-to-be as though it were an illegitimate emancipation from eternal being, a wrong for which destruction is the only penance." Physicist Max Born, in commenting upon Werner Heisenberg's arriving at the idea that the elementary particles of quantum mechanics are to be seen as different manifestations, different quantum states, of one and the same "primordial substance,"' proposed that this primordial substance be called apeiron.

=== A free-floating Earth ===
Anaximander was the first to conceive a mechanical model of the world. In his model, the Earth floats very still in the centre of the infinite, not supported by anything. It remains "in the same place because of its indifference", a point of view that Aristotle considered ingenious, in On the Heavens. Its curious shape is that of a cylinder with a height one-third of its diameter. The flat top forms the inhabited world.

Carlo Rovelli suggests that Anaximander took the idea of the Earth's shape as a floating disk from Thales, who had imagined the Earth floating in water, the "immense ocean from which everything is born and upon which the Earth floats." Anaximander was then able to envisage the Earth at the centre of an infinite space, in which case it required no support as there was nowhere "down" to fall. In Rovelli's view, the shape – a cylinder or a sphere – is unimportant compared to the appreciation of a "finite body that floats free in space."

Whereas Thales thought the Earth floated in the great Ocean, Anaximander saw the Earth as floating in the infinite. Where Thales conceived of things falling down to Earth, and Earth being above the Ocean, Anaximander saw the Earth as the centre, and that things could fall from any direction. This has been thought a large conceptual advance in cosmology.

Anaximander's realization that the Earth floats free without falling and does not need to be resting on something has been indicated by many as the first cosmological revolution and the starting point of scientific thinking. Karl Popper calls this idea "one of the boldest, most revolutionary, and most portentous ideas in the whole history of human thinking." Such a model allowed the concept that celestial bodies could pass under the Earth, opening the way to Greek astronomy. Rovelli suggests that seeing the stars circling the Pole star, and both vanishing below the horizon on one side and reappearing above it on the other, would suggest to the astronomer that there was a void both above and below the Earth.

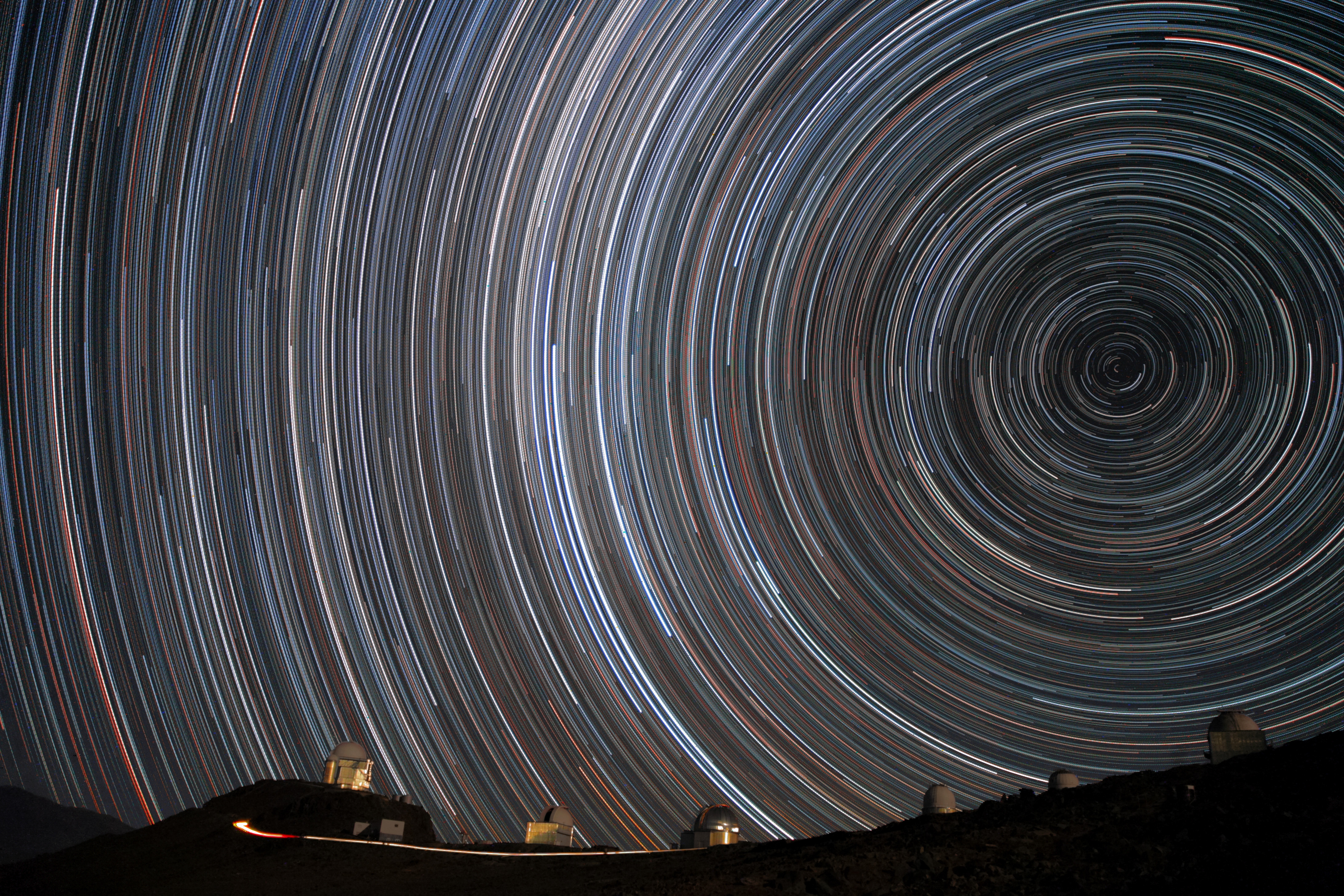
The sight of stars circling the Pole star and vanishing and reappearing at the horizon could have suggested to Anaximander that the Earth was surrounded above and below by a void.

=== Cosmology ===
Map of Anaximander's universe

Anaximander's bold use of non-mythological explanatory hypotheses considerably distinguishes him from previous cosmology writers such as Hesiod. It indicates a pre-Socratic effort to demystify physical processes. His major contribution to history was writing the oldest prose document about the Universe and the origins of life; for this he is often called the "Father of Cosmology" and founder of astronomy. However, pseudo-Plutarch states that he still viewed celestial bodies as deities. He placed the celestial bodies in the wrong order. He thought that the stars were nearest to the Earth, then the Moon, and the Sun farthest away. His scheme is compatible with the Indo-Iranian philosophical traditions contained in the Iranian Avesta and the Indian Upanishads.

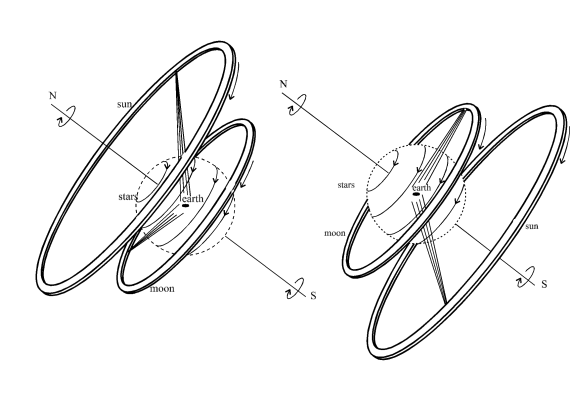
Illustration of Anaximander's models of the universe. On the left, daytime in summer; on the right, nighttime in winter. Note the sphere represents the combined rings of all of the stars about the very small inner cylinder which represents the Earth.

At the origin, after the separation of hot and cold, a ball of flame appeared that surrounded Earth like bark on a tree. This ball broke apart to form the rest of the Universe. It resembled a system of hollow concentric wheels, filled with fire, with the rims pierced by holes like those of a flute. Consequently, the Sun was the fire that one could see through a hole the same size as the Earth on the farthest wheel, and an eclipse corresponded with the occlusion of that hole. The diameter of the solar wheel was twenty-seven times that of the Earth (or twenty-eight, depending on the sources) and the lunar wheel, whose fire was less intense, eighteen (or nineteen) times. Its hole could change shape, thus explaining lunar phases. The stars and the planets, located closer, followed the same model.

Anaximander was the first astronomer to consider the Sun as a huge mass, and consequently, to realize how far from Earth it might be, and the first to present a system where the celestial bodies turned at different distances. Furthermore, according to Diogenes Laertius (II, 2), he built a celestial sphere. This invention undoubtedly made him the first to realize the obliquity of the Zodiac as the Roman philosopher Pliny the Elder reports in Natural History (II, 8). It is a little early to use the term ecliptic, but his knowledge and work on astronomy confirm that he must have observed the inclination of the celestial sphere in relation to the plane of the Earth to explain the seasons. The doxographer and theologian Aetius attributes to Pythagoras the exact measurement of the obliquity.

=== Multiple worlds ===
According to Simplicius, Anaximander already speculated on the plurality of worlds, similar to atomists Leucippus and Democritus, and later philosopher Epicurus. These thinkers supposed that worlds appeared and disappeared for a while, and that some were born when others perished. They claimed that this movement was eternal, "for without movement, there can be no generation, no destruction".

In addition to Simplicius, Hippolytus reports Anaximander's claim that from the infinite comes the principle of beings, which themselves come from the heavens and the worlds (several doxographers use the plural when this philosopher is referring to the worlds within, which are often infinite in quantity). Cicero writes that he attributes different gods to the countless worlds.

This theory places Anaximander close to the Atomists and the Epicureans who, more than a century later, also claimed that an infinity of worlds appeared and disappeared. In the timeline of the Greek history of thought, some thinkers conceptualized a single world (Plato, Aristotle, Anaxagoras and Archelaus), while others instead speculated on the existence of a series of worlds, continuous or non-continuous (Anaximenes, Heraclitus, Empedocles and Diogenes).

=== Meteorological phenomena ===
Anaximander attributed some phenomena, such as thunder and lightning, to the intervention of elements, rather than to divine causes. In his system, thunder results from the shock of clouds hitting each other; the loudness of the sound is proportionate with that of the shock. Thunder without lightning is the result of the wind being too weak to emit any flame, but strong enough to produce a sound. A flash of lightning without thunder is a jolt of the air that disperses and falls, allowing a less active fire to break free. Thunderbolts are the result of a thicker and more violent air flow.

He saw the sea as a remnant of the mass of humidity that once surrounded Earth. A part of that mass evaporated under the Sun's action, thus causing the winds and even the rotation of the celestial bodies, which he believed were attracted to places where water is more abundant. He explained rain as a product of the humidity pumped up from Earth by the sun. For him, the Earth was slowly drying up and water only remained in the deepest regions, which someday would go dry as well. According to Aristotle's Meteorology (II, 3), Democritus also shared this opinion.

=== Origin of mankind ===
Anaximander speculated about the beginnings and origin of animal life, and that humans came from other animals in waters. According to his evolutionary theory, animals sprang out of the sea long ago, born trapped in a spiny bark, but as they got older, the bark would dry up and animals would be able to break it. The 3rd century Roman writer Censorinus reports:

Anaximander of Miletus considered that from warmed up water and earth emerged either fish or entirely fishlike animals. Inside these animals, men took form and embryos were held prisoners until puberty; only then, after these animals burst open, could men and women come out, now able to feed themselves.

Anaximander put forward the idea that humans had to spend part of this transition inside the mouths of big fish to protect themselves from the Earth's climate until they could come out in open air and lose their scales. He thought that, considering humans' extended infancy, we could not have survived in the primeval world in the same manner we do presently.

== Other accomplishments ==
=== Cartography ===
Possible rendering of Anaximander's world map

Both Strabo and Agathemerus (later Greek geographers) claim that, according to the geographer Eratosthenes, Anaximander was the first to publish a map of the world. The map probably inspired the Greek historian Hecataeus of Miletus to draw a more accurate version. Strabo viewed both as the first geographers after Homer.

Maps were produced in ancient times, also notably in Egypt, Lydia, the Middle East, and Babylon. Only some small examples survived until today. The unique example of a world map comes from the late Babylonian Map of the World later than 9th century BC but is based probably on a much older map. These maps indicated directions, roads, towns, borders, and geological features. Anaximander's innovation was to represent the entire inhabited land known to the ancient Greeks.

Such an accomplishment is more significant than it at first appears. Anaximander most likely drew this map for three reasons. First, it could be used to improve navigation and trade between Miletus's colonies and other colonies around the Mediterranean Sea and Black Sea. Second, Thales would probably have found it easier to convince the Ionian city-states to join in a federation in order to push the Median threat away if he possessed such a tool. Finally, the philosophical idea of a global representation of the world simply for the sake of knowledge was reason enough to design one.

Surely aware of the sea's convexity, he may have designed his map on a slightly rounded metal surface. The centre or "navel" of the world (ὀμφαλός γῆς omphalós gẽs) could have been Delphi, but is more likely in Anaximander's time to have been located near Miletus. The Aegean Sea was near the map's centre and enclosed by three continents, themselves located in the middle of the ocean and isolated like islands by sea and rivers. Europe was bordered on the south by the Mediterranean Sea and was separated from Asia by the Black Sea, the Lake Maeotis, and, further east, either by the Phasis River (now called the Rioni in Georgia) or the Tanais. The Nile flowed south into the ocean, separating Libya (which was the name for the part of the then-known African continent) from Asia.

=== Gnomon ===
The Suda relates that Anaximander explained some basic notions of geometry. It also mentions his interest in the measurement of time and associates him with the introduction in Greece of the gnomon. In Lacedaemon, he participated in the construction, or at least in the adjustment, of sundials to indicate solstices and equinoxes. Indeed, a gnomon required adjustments from a place to another because of the difference in latitude.

In his time, the gnomon was simply a vertical pillar or rod mounted on a horizontal plane. The position of its shadow on the plane indicated the time of day. As it moves through its apparent course, the Sun draws a curve with the tip of the projected shadow, which is shortest at noon, when pointing due south. The variation in the tip's position at noon indicates the solar time and the seasons; the shadow is longest on the winter solstice and shortest on the summer solstice.

The invention of the gnomon itself cannot be attributed to Anaximander because its use, as well as the division of days into twelve parts, came from the Babylonians. It is they, according to Herodotus' Histories (II, 109), who gave the Greeks the art of time measurement. It is likely that he was not the first to determine the solstices, because no calculation is necessary. On the other hand, equinoxes do not correspond to the middle point between the positions during solstices, as the Babylonians thought. As the Suda seems to suggest, it is very likely that with his knowledge of geometry, he became the first Greek to determine accurately the equinoxes.

=== Prediction of an earthquake ===
In his philosophical work De Divinatione (I, 50, 112), Cicero states that Anaximander convinced the inhabitants of Lacedaemon to abandon their city and spend the night in the country with their weapons because an earthquake was near. The city collapsed when the top of the Taygetus split like the stern of a ship. Pliny the Elder also mentions this anecdote (II, 81), suggesting that it came from an "admirable inspiration", as opposed to Cicero, who did not associate the prediction with divination.

=== Scientific method ===
Rovelli credits Anaximander with pioneering the "first great scientific revolution in history" by introducing the naturalistic approach to understanding the universe, according to which the universe operates by inviolable laws, without recourse to supernatural explanations. According to Rovelli, Anaximander not only paved the way for modern science, but revolutionized the process for how we form our worldview, by constantly questioning and rejecting certainty. Rovelli further states that Anaximander has not been given his due credit, largely because his naturalistic approach was strongly opposed in antiquity (among others by Aristotle) and had yet to yield the tangible benefits it has today.

Anaximander's transformation of method
Situation	Practice
Earlier method Different school	Unqualified criticism
Earlier method Same school	Unqualified acceptance
Anaximander's method	Detailed appreciation of teaching Then, teaching is questioned and improved
Example	Thales: "World is made of water" – Anaximander: "Not so" Thales: "Earth floats on water" – Anaximander: "Earth floats in the infinite" Thales: "Earthquakes due to wobbles in Ocean" – Anaximander: "No, due to Earth splitting open"

== Legacy ==
Bertrand Russell in the History of Western Philosophy interprets Anaximander's theories as an assertion of the necessity of an appropriate balance between earth, fire, and water, all of which may be independently seeking to aggrandize their proportions relative to the others. Anaximander seems to express his belief that a natural order ensures balance among these elements, that where there was fire, ashes (earth) now exist. His Greek peers echoed this sentiment with their belief in natural boundaries beyond which not even the gods could operate.

Friedrich Nietzsche, in Philosophy in the Tragic Age of the Greeks, claimed that Anaximander was a pessimist who asserted that the primal being of the world was a state of indefiniteness. In accordance with this, anything definite has to eventually pass back into indefiniteness. In other words, Anaximander viewed "...all coming-to-be as though it were an illegitimate emancipation from eternal being, a wrong for which destruction is the only penance". (Ibid., § 4) The world of individual objects, in this way of thinking, has no worth and should perish.

Martin Heidegger lectured extensively on Anaximander, and delivered a lecture entitled "Anaximander's Saying" which was subsequently included in Off the Beaten Track. The lecture examines the ontological difference and the oblivion of Being or Dasein in the context of the Anaximander fragment. Heidegger's lecture is, in turn, an important influence on the French philosopher Jacques Derrida.

In the 2017 essay collection Anaximander in Context: New Studies on the Origins of Greek Philosophy, Dirk Couprie, Robert Hahn and Gerald Naddaf describe Anaximander as "one of the greatest minds in history", but one that has not been given his due. Couprie goes to state that he considers him on par with Newton. Similar sentiments are expressed in Carlo Rovelli's 2011 book The First Scientist: Anaximander and His Legacy.

The Anaximander (31st) High School of Thessaloniki, Greece is named after Anaximander.

The lunar crater Anaximander was named after him in 1935.

== Works ==
According to the Suda:

- On Nature (Περὶ φύσεως / Perì phúseôs)
- Rotation of the Earth (Γῆς περίοδος / Gễs períodos)
- On Fixed stars (Περὶ τῶν ἀπλανῶν / Perì tỗn aplanỗn)
- The [Celestial] Sphere (Σφαῖρα / Sphaĩra)

== See also ==
- Indefinite monism

== Sources ==
=== Primary ===
- Aelian: Various History (III, 17)
- Aëtius: De Fide (I-III; V)
- Agathemerus: A Sketch of Geography in Epitome (I, 1)
- Aristotle: Meteorology (II, 3) Translated by E. W. Webster
- Aristotle: On Generation and Corruption (II, 5) Translated by H. H. Joachim
- Aristotle: On the Heavens (II, 13) Translated by J. L. Stocks
- Aristotle. Physics – via Wikisource. (III, 5, 204 b 33–34)
- Censorinus: De Die Natali (IV, 7) See original text at LacusCurtius
- Cicero (1853) [original: 44 BC]. On divination . Translated by Charles Duke Yonge – via Wikisource. (I, 50, 112)
- Cicero: On the Nature of the Gods (I, 10, 25)
- Laërtius, Diogenes. "Socrates, with predecessors and followers: Anaximander" . Lives of the Eminent Philosophers. Vol. 1:2. Translated by Hicks, Robert Drew (Two volume ed.). Loeb Classical Library.
- Euripides: The Suppliants (532) Translated by E. P. Coleridge
- Eusebius of Caesarea: Preparation for the Gospel (X, 14, 11) Translated by E.H. Gifford
- Heidel, W.A. Anaximander's Book: PAAAS, vol. 56, n.7, 1921, pp. 239–288.
- Herodotus: Histories (II, 109) See original text in Perseus project
- Hippolytus (?): Refutation of All Heresies (I, 5) Translated by Roberts and Donaldson
- Pliny the Elder: Natural History (II, 8) See original text in Perseus project
- Pseudo-Plutarch: The Doctrines of the Philosophers (I, 3; I, 7; II, 20–28; III, 2–16; V, 19)
- Seneca the Younger: Natural Questions (II, 18)
- Simplicius: Comments on Aristotle's Physics (24, 13–25; 1121, 5–9)
- Strabo: Geography (I, 1) Books 1‑7, 15‑17 translated by H. L. Jones
- Themistius: Oratio (36, 317)
- The Suda (Suda On Line)

=== Secondary ===
- Brumbaugh, Robert S. (1964). The Philosophers of Greece. New York: Thomas Y. Crowell.
- Burnet, John (1920). Early Greek Philosophy (3rd ed.). London: Black. Archived from the original on 2011-01-11.
- Conche, Marcel (1991). Anaximandre: Fragments et témoignages (in French). Paris: Presses universitaires de France. ISBN 2-13-043785-0. The default source; anything not otherwise attributed should be in Conche.
- Couprie, Dirk L.; Robert Hahn; Gerard Naddaf (2003). Anaximander in Context: New Studies in the Origins of Greek Philosophy. Albany: State University of New York Press. ISBN 0-7914-5538-6.
- Furley, David J.; Reginald E. Allen (1970). Studies in Presocratic Philosophy. Vol. 1. London: Routledge. OCLC 79496039.
- Guthrie, W. K. C. (1962). The Earlier Presocratics and the Pythagoreans. A History of Greek Philosophy. Vol. 1. Cambridge: Cambridge University Press.
- Hahn, Robert (2001). Anaximander and the Architects. The Contribution of Egyptian and Greek Architectural Technologies to the Origins of Greek Philosophy. Albany: State University of New York Press. ISBN 978-0-7914-4794-9.
- Heidegger, Martin (2002). Off the Beaten Track. Cambridge: Cambridge University Press. ISBN 0-521-80114-1.
- Kahn, Charles H. (1960). Anaximander and the Origins of Greek Cosmology. New York: Columbia University Press.
- Kirk, Geoffrey S.; Raven, John E. (1983). The Presocratic Philosophers (2nd ed.). Cambridge: Cambridge University Press. ISBN 978-0521274555.
- Luchte, James (2011). Early Greek Thought: Before the Dawn. London: Bloomsbury Publishing. ISBN 978-0567353313.
- Nietzsche, Friedrich (1962). Philosophy in the Tragic Age of the Greeks. Chicago: Regnery. ISBN 0-89526-944-9.
- Robinson, John Mansley (1968). An Introduction to Early Greek Philosophy. Houghton and Mifflin. ISBN 0-395-05316-1.
- Ross, Stephen David (1993). Injustice and Restitution: The Ordinance of Time. Albany: State University of New York Press. ISBN 0-7914-1670-4.
- Rovelli, Carlo (2011). The First Scientist, Anaximander and his Legacy. Yardley: Westholme. ISBN 978-1-59416-131-5.
- Rovelli, Carlo (2023). Anaximander and the Nature of Science. Allen Lane. ISBN 978-0-241-63504-9.
- Sandywell, Barry (2014) [1996]. Presocratic Reflexivity: The Construction of Philosophical Discourse, c. 600–450 BC. Vol. 3. London: Routledge. ISBN 978-1138879966.
- Seligman, Paul (1962). The "Apeiron" of Anaximander. London: Athlone Press.
- Vernant, Jean-Pierre (1982). The Origins of Greek Thought. Ithaca: Cornell University Press. ISBN 0-8014-9293-9.
- Wheelwright, Philip, ed. (1966). The Presocratics. New York: Macmillan.
- Wright, M. R. (1995). Cosmology in Antiquity. London: Routledge. ISBN 978-0415083720.
