= Edwin Francis Carpenter =

American astronomer

Edwin Francis Carpenter (November 1, 1898 – February 11, 1963) was an American astronomer.

He was born in Boston, Massachusetts and received his A.B. and A.M. from Harvard University. In 1925 he was awarded a Ph.D. from University of California at Berkeley. He became an instructor at the University of Arizona, and by 1936 he was heading up the Astronomy Department. In 1938 he became directory of Steward Observatory, remaining in that post until 1963. He also served as Vice-president and chairman for the Astronomical Divisions of the American Association for the Advancement of Science.

Among the subjects of his research were white dwarf stars, supernovae and galactic astronomy. He discovered a relationship between the density of galaxies in a cluster and the size of the cluster: larger clusters have a lower density of galaxies. He provided the data that led to Willem Jacob Luyten's discovery of UV Ceti, the first known flare star.

He was married to botanist Ethel Grace Stiffler in 1933, and the couple had two children, Roger and Emily. The asteroid 1852 Carpenter is named after him, while the crater Carpenter on the Moon is co-named in honor of him and James Carpenter.
