= Anaximander (31st) High School of Thessaloniki =

Anaximander (No. 31) High School of Thessaloniki
- Αναξιμάνδρειο (31ο) Γενικό Λύκειο Θεσσαλονίκης
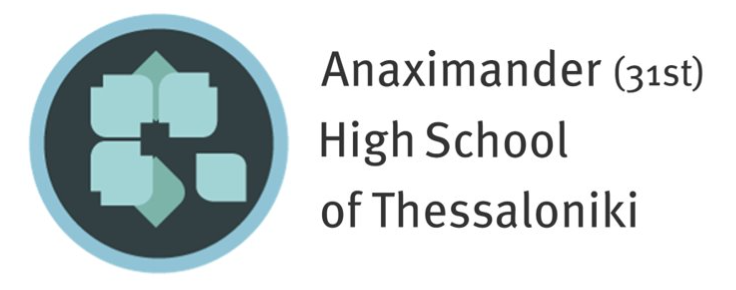

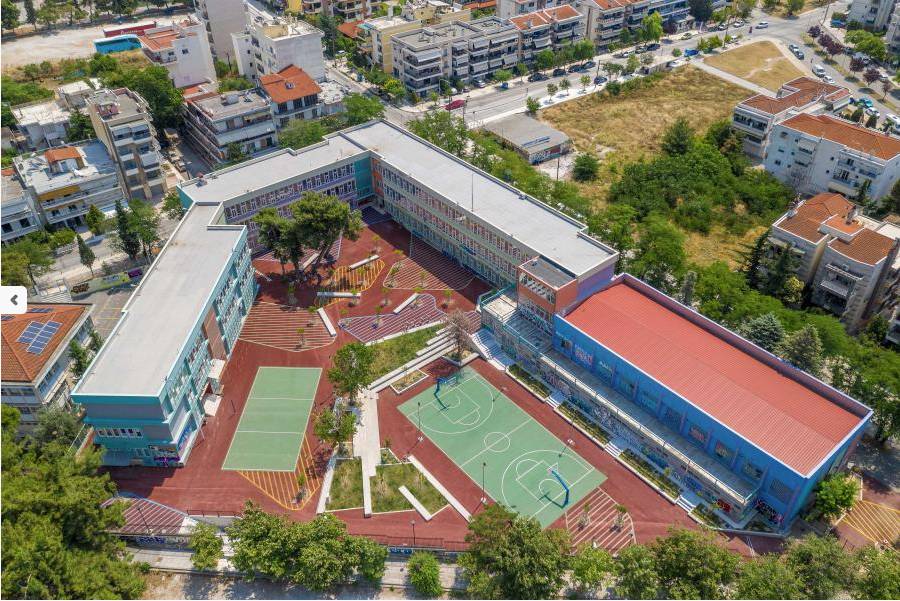

Location
- 79 Anaximandrou St., Thessaloniki; Greece
- Coordinates: 40.595461°N 22.974555°E

Information
- Other names: AHST, Anaximander or 31st
- Type: Public Secondary
- Motto: A Tradition of Excellence
- Established: 1975
- Status: Active
- Principal: Maria A. Naoumidou
- Grades: 10–12
- Enrollment: 311 (2022–2023)
- Colors: Cyan and grey
- Website: 31lyk-thess.thess.sch.gr/autosch/joomla15/

Anaximander (31st) High School of Thessaloniki (Greek: Αναξιμάνδρειο (31ο) Γενικό Λύκειο Θεσσαλονίκης) or Anaximander High School of Thessaloniki or Anaximander High School or simply Anaximander Lyceum, commonly referred to among its students as 31st, is a public senior high school (general lyceum) in Thessaloniki, Greece. It is operated by the Greek Ministry of Education, Religious Affairs and Sports. It is one of the most prestigious public high schools in Thessaloniki metropolitan area.

It is named after the pre-Socratic Greek philosopher Anaximander.

Anaximander (31st) High School of Thessaloniki is part of the Directorate of Secondary Education of East Thessaloniki Schools system. The majority of the students come from the 2nd Middle School of Charilaou and 4th Middle School of Charilaou.

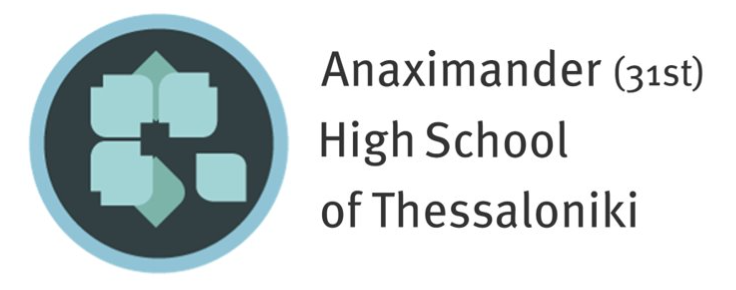
Logo

It was established as the Charilaou All-Girls High School in 1975 and became the 2nd High School of Charilaou in 1979. It was renamed to its current name in 1999.

The current principal of Anaximander (31st) High School is Maria Α. Naoumidou. Before being appointed in 2018, Naoumidou was the principal of 4th Middle School of Charilaou.

There are 3 orientation groups – departments including 3 subjects each: (I) Humanities and Social Sciences, (II) Sciences and Health Sciences and (III) Economic and Computer Studies.

The school is at 79 Anaximander Road, (79 Anaximander Road, Thessaloniki) in the Trohiodromikon neighbourhood near Nea Elvetia Park, and is near the Nea Elvetia metro station on the Thessaloniki Metro.

== See also ==
- Education in Greece
- Lyceum
- Ministry of Education, Religious Affairs and Sports (Greece)
