= Philosophy in the Tragic Age of the Greeks =

Incomplete book by Friedrich Nietzsche

- Cover of 1962 Regnery Gateway edition
- Author: Friedrich Nietzsche
- Original title: Philosophie im tragischen Zeitalter der Griechen
- Language: German
- Subject: Pre-Socratic philosophy
- Published: Posthumously

Philosophy in the Tragic Age of the Greeks (German: Philosophie im tragischen Zeitalter der Griechen) is an incomplete book by Friedrich Nietzsche. He had a clean copy made from his notes with the intention of publication. The notes were written around 1873. In it he discussed five Greek philosophers from the sixth and fifth centuries BC. They are Thales, Anaximander, Heraclitus, Parmenides, and Anaxagoras. He had, at one time, intended to include Democritus, Empedocles, and Socrates. The book ends abruptly after the discussion of Anaxagoras's cosmogony.

== Content ==
=== Early preface ===
Nietzsche stated that he wanted to present the outlooks of very worthy individuals who originated in ancient Greece from 600 BC to 400 BC. "The task is to bring to light what we must ever love and honor...." Nietzsche wanted future humans to be able to say, "So this has existed – once, at least – and is therefore a possibility, this way of life, this way of looking at the human scene."

=== Later preface ===
By selecting only a few doctrines for each philosopher, Nietzsche hoped to exhibit each philosopher's personality.

=== Philosophers ===
==== Thales ====
Thales proposed that water is the origin of all things. Nietzsche claimed that this must be taken seriously for three reasons.

1. It makes a statement about the primal origin of all things;
2. It uses language that has nothing to do with fable or myth;
3. It reflects the vision that all things are really one.

Thales' generalization was the result of creative imagination and analogy. He did not use reason, logical proof, myth, or allegory. This was a first attempt to think about nature without the use of myths about gods. However, instead of trying to gain knowledge of everything, he wanted to know the one important common property of all things.

In order to communicate his vision of oneness, he expressed himself by applying the analogy of water.

==== Anaximander ====
Anaximander of Miletus was the first philosopher who wrote his words. His most famous passage is, "The source of coming-to-be for existing things is that into which destruction, too, happens according to necessity; for they pay penalty and retribution to each other for their injustice according to the assessment of Time." This pessimistic expression presented existence as something that should not be. Any definite thing must pay for its individuality by, after a short time, passing back into its indefinite (apeiron) source. This source cannot also be definite. Therefore, it is indefinite and does not pass away.

Anaximander was the first Greek to provide an ethical or moral interpretation of existence. For emerging from the primeval oneness, each definite individual thing must pay a price by returning. This meant that the individual, separate existence of each and every thing is unjust. It has no justification or value in itself.

His manner of living was in accordance with his thought. He dressed and spoke in a dignified, solemn manner. This unity of style was typical of the pre-Platonic philosophers.

==== Heraclitus ====
As the opposite of Anaximander, Heraclitus saw no injustice, guilt, evil, or penance in the emergence and disappearance of worldly objects. To him, continuous becoming and passing away is the order of nature. There is a wonderful fixed order, regularity, and certainty that shows itself in all change and becoming. Heraclitus did not think that there is a metaphysical, undefinable indefinite (apeiron) out of which all definite things come into existence. Also, he denied that there is any permanent being. Nietzsche paraphrased him as saying, "You use names for things as though they rigidly, persistently endured; yet even the stream into which you step a second time is not the one you stepped into before."

Heraclitus's way of thinking was the result of perception and intuition. He despised rational, logical, conceptual thought. His pronouncements were purposely self-contradictory. "We are and at the same time are not." "Being and nonbeing is at the same time the same and not the same." This intuitive thinking is based on seeing the changing world of experience which is conditioned by never-ending variations in time and space. Every object that is perceived through time and space has an existence that is relative to other objects. Nature and reality are seen as a continuous action in which there is no permanent existence.

The unending strife between opposites, which seek to re-unite, is a kind of lawful justice for Heraclitus. In accordance with the Greek culture of contest, the strife among all things follows a built-in law or standard.

According to Heraclitus, the one is the many. Every thing is really fire. In passing away, the things of the world show a desire to be consumed in the all-destroying cosmic fire. When they are part of the fire again, their desire is briefly satisfied. But things soon come into being again as a result of the fire's impulse to play a game with itself.

Due to the contradictions that occur in Heraclitus's brief sayings, he has been accused of being obscure. However, Nietzsche asserts that he was very clear. The shortness and terseness of Heraclitus's statements may seem to result in their obscurity, but Nietzsche stated that they are unclear only for readers who do not take the time to think about what is being said.

Nietzsche interpreted Heraclitus's words, "I sought for myself," as indicating that he possessed great self-esteem and conviction. Without concern as to whether his thoughts appealed to anyone beside himself, he pronounced that he saw fixed law in the continual change of becoming. Also, he intuited that the particular changes that occur with strict necessity are, on the whole, the play of a game. Heraclitus wanted future humanity to know his timeless truths.

==== Parmenides ====
Many of Parmenides's qualities were the direct opposite of Heraclitus. Heraclitus grasped his truths through intuition. He saw and knew the world of Becoming. Parmenides, however, arrived at his truths through pure logic. He calculated and deduced his doctrine of Being.

Parmenides had an early doctrine and a later, different, teaching. Nietzsche claimed that Parmenides's two ways of thinking not only divided his own life into two periods but also separated all pre-Socratic thinking into two halves. The earlier way was the Anaximandrean period. This dealt with two worlds: the world of Becoming and the world of Being. The second was the Parmenidean. In this world, there is no becoming, change, or impermanence. There is only Being.

The qualities of the world, Parmenides thought, were divided into opposites. There are positive qualities and there are their opposite negations. His division was based on abstract logic and not on the evidence of the senses. This dichotomy of positive and negative then became the separation into the existent and the nonexistent. For things to become, there must be an existent and a non-existent. Desire unites these opposites and creates the world of Becoming. When desire is satisfied, the existent and the nonexistent oppose each other and the things pass away.

Nietzsche did not think that an external event led to Parmenides's denial of Becoming. The influence of Xenophanes is made negligible by Nietzsche. Even though both men gave great importance to the concept of unity, Xenophanes communicated in ways that were alien to Parmenides. Xenophanes was a philosophical poet whose view of mystic unity was related to religion. He was an ethicist who rejected the contemporary values of Greece. Nietzsche claimed that the common attribute between Parmenides and Xenophanes was their love of personal freedom and unconventionality, not their emphasis on oneness.

The internal event that led to Parmenides's denial of Becoming began when he considered the nature of negative qualities. He asked himself whether something that has no being can have being. Logically, this was the same as asking whether A is not A. Parmenides then realized that what is, is. Also, what is not, is not. His previous thinking about negative qualities was then seen as being very illogical. Heraclitus's contradictory statements were considered to be totally irrational.

If that which is, is, and that which is not, is not, then several conclusions follow. That which truly is must be forever present. The existent also is not divisible, because there is no other existent to divide it. It is also immobile and finite. In sum, there is only eternal oneness.

The senses lead us to believe otherwise. Therefore, for Parmenides, the senses are illusive, mendacious, and deceitful. He accepted only his logical and rational conclusions. All sensual evidence was ignored. Parmenides only affirmed his extremely abstract, general truth which was totally unlike the reality of common experience.

Although logically certain, Parmenides's concept of being was empty of content. No sense perception illustrated this truth. "What is, is" is a judgement of pure thought, not experience. Nietzsche claimed that Parmenides created his concept of being from his own personal experience of feeling himself as alive. He then illogically attributed this general concept of absolute being to everything in the world. Thus, Nietzsche saw being as a subjective concept that was mistakenly asserted to be objective. Nietzsche's paraphrase of Parmenides's truth was, "I breathe, therefore being exists."

Along with his disciple Zeno of Elea, Parmenides stated that there is no such thing as infinity. If infinity exists, it would be the indivisible, immobile, eternal unity of being. In other words, it would be finite. Zeno's examples of flying arrows and Achilles chasing a tortoise show that motion over an infinite space would be impossible. But we do experience motion. The world does exhibit finite infinity. Parmenides rejects, then, the perceivable world of motion and asserts that reality agrees only with his logical concepts, which do not include finite infinity. For him, thinking and being are the same. What he thinks is what exists.

Objections can be raised against Parmenides's principles that sensual perception does not show true reality and that thinking is unmoving being. If the senses are unreal, how can they deceive? If thinking is immobile being, how does it move from concept to concept? Instead, it can be stated that the many things that are experienced by the senses are not deceptive. Also, motion can have being. No objection, however, can be made to Parmenides's self-evident main teaching that there is being, or, what is, is.

==== Anaxagoras ====
Anaxagoras raised two objections against Parmenides:

1. the origin of semblance, and
2. the mobility of thought.

He did not object, however, to Parmenides's main doctrine that there is only being, not becoming. Anaximander and Heraclitus had claimed that there is becoming and passing away. Thales and Heraclitus had said that the world of multiple qualities comes out of one prime substance. With Anaxagoras, all subsequent philosophers and scientists rejected all coming into existence out of nothing and disappearance into nothing.

If the many things that we experience in the world are not mere semblance but do not come from nothing and do not come from one single thing, what is their origin? Since like produces like, the many different things come from many different things. In other words, there are infinitely many different prime substances. Their total is always constant but their arrangements change.

Why do the forms and patterns of these real substances change? Because they are in motion. Change and motion are not semblance and are truly real. Does the movement come from within each thing? Is there another external thing that moves each object?

Movement is not mere appearance. Movement occurs because each substance is similar to each other substance in that they are all made of the same matter. There is no total isolation or complete difference between substances. This common material substratum allows them to interact. When two substances try to occupy the same space, one of the substances must move away. This is actual motion and change.

If it is certain that our ideas appear to us in succession, then they must move themselves because they are not moved by things that are not ideas. This proves that there is something in the world that moves itself. Ideas are also capable of moving things that are different from themselves. They move the body. Therefore, there is a thinking substance that moves itself and other substances. This nous (mind, intelligence) is made out of extremely fine and delicate matter. It is an ordering, knowing, purposeful mover. Nous was the first cause of every subsequent mechanical change in the universe.

Originally, before nous moved the first particle of matter, there was a complete mixture which was composed of infinitely small components of things. Each of these was a homoeomeria, the small parts being the same as the large whole. For example, a tooth is made of small teeth. This is the result of the thought that like must come from like. After the movement began, individual objects became separated from this mixture when like combined with like. When one substance finally predominated, the accumulation became a particular thing. This process is called "coming to be" or "becoming."

Nous is not a part of the original mixture. It started the revolutionary motion which separated things from the primal mixture. The motion is a centrifugal, spiralling vortex in which likes attach to their likes. There is no god who moves things with a purpose in mind. There is only a mechanical whirlpool of movement. Unlike Parmenides's motionless sphere of being, Anaxagoras saw the world as a moving circle of becoming. Nous started the spinning. Thereafter the universe developed on its own, according to lawful necessity.

To be able to start and sustain motion against the resistance of the infinite mixture, nous had to use a sudden, infinitely strong and infinitely rapid, force. It also had to move the first point in a circular path that was larger than its own size. In this way, it affected other points. Nous freely chose to start the vortex. It thereby created its own goal and purpose in a playful game. This was not a moral or ethical process. Rather, it was aesthetic, in that nous simply wanted to enjoy the spectacle of its own creation.

Later philosophers, such as Plato, wanted to attribute ethical properties to nous's creation of the world. For them, it should be made in the most perfect, beautiful, useful manner. Anaxagoras, however, did not employ teleology. Nous, for him, was a mechanical, efficient cause, not a final cause. Any future purpose would have eliminated a freely chosen start.

Nietzsche's book abruptly ends here with a description of a nous that created the world as a game. The freedom of nous's creative will is opposed to the necessary determinism of its creation, the universe. Nous is referred to as a mind (Geist) that has free, arbitrary choice. The created world, physis, is a determined, mechanical piece of machinery. Any order or efficiency of things is only an outcome of purposeless change.

== Abandonment ==
Nietzsche left this work unfinished in order to turn his attention to aiding Richard Wagner. The composer was having difficulty raising funds in Germany for his Bayreuth Festspielhaus. Instead of concerning himself with the Ancient Greeks, Nietzsche tried to convince his contemporary Germans that their cultural outlook was incorrect. He did this by criticizing David Strauss’s The Old and the New Faith. In spite of great eye pain, Nietzsche chose to produce his first Untimely Meditation entitled David Strauss: the Confessor and the Writer instead of completing his work on Greek philosophy.
