= Two Dickinson Street Co-op =

Student dining co-op at Princeton University

Coordinates: 40°20′44.59″N 74°39′39.87″W

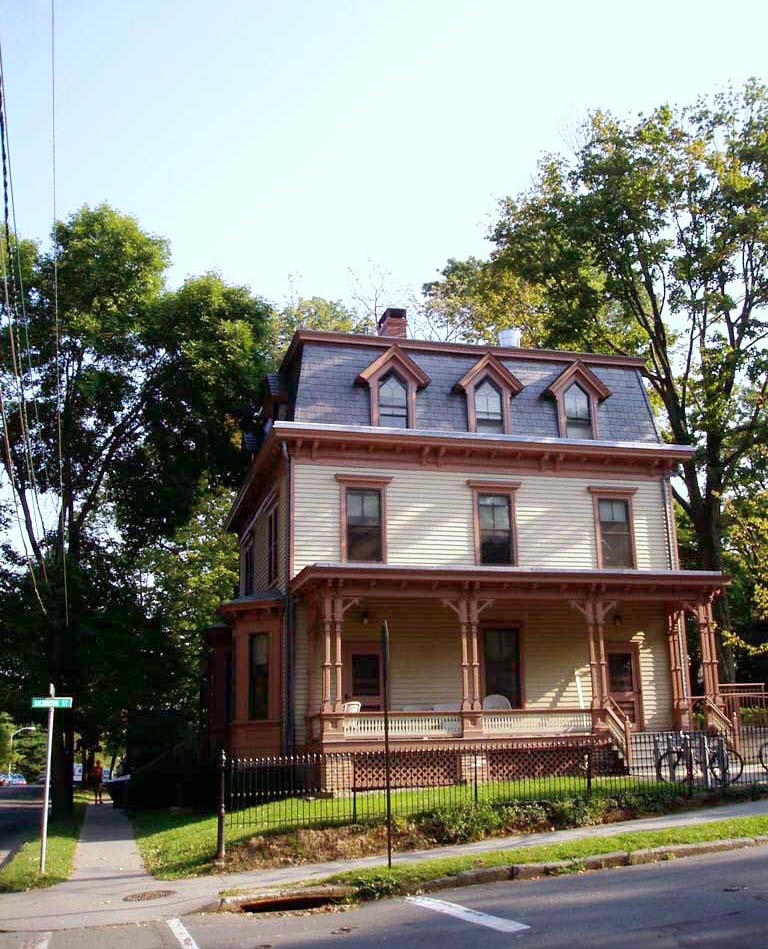
Dickinson St. entrance to 2D

The Two Dickinson Street Co-op, or 2D, is one of the five student dining co-ops at Princeton University in Princeton, New Jersey. 2D is a 50-member vegetarian (and vegan-friendly) cooperative located across the street from the Princeton University campus.

2D is an alternative to the eating clubs, which constitute the most commonly selected eating option for upperclassmen at Princeton University. Unusual for independent dining co-ops, it is based in university-managed housing.

== About ==
The co-op uses consensus decision-making processes and collective self-governance; teams of members alternate cooking dinner each night, and often prepare and eat informal lunches and breakfasts at the co-op. Each member pays dues, cooks at least once a week, participates in a cleaning schedule, and has a chore. Chores range from bread baking to treasurer to dishrag washer. Members join for a variety of reasons, including a commitment to eating vegetarian or vegan food, cost, political or religious beliefs, and a lively social community.

The building is officially a university-owned dormitory subject to university housing restrictions and fees, but most members of the club choose to live in 2D in order to participate in the dining co-op. All residents are given the opportunity to join the co-op and the remaining members are chosen through a lottery. Approximately half of the members of the co-op actually live in the house, while the other half live either on campus or elsewhere.

== History ==
2D was founded in 1977-1978 as a result of two years of student activism demanding an alternative to the eating clubs.

Peter Singer, a noted controversial philosopher at Princeton in favour of animal rights, was invited to eat at 2D on two occasions.

In 1999, a group of 2D alumni founded Boston Community Cooperatives, a 501(c)(3) organization that owns and operates a group equity model of communally owned, democratically controlled and affordable residential housing cooperatives, similar to the NASCO model of cooperative ownership.

== Former members ==
Women's ice hockey legend Patty Kazmaier-Sandt joined the coop as a sophomore in 1982, and remained in the coop through her senior year. Spelling bee champion Rebecca Sealfon was also a member of 2D.

Josue Lajeunesse, former custodian at 2D (currently custodian at Whitman College, Princeton University), was one of the main subjects of the documentary film The Philosopher Kings, and is an active humanitarian working to make clean water accessible to his village of Lasource, Haiti.

Mathematician Harald Helfgott was a member while completing his Ph.D. at Princeton.

== In fiction ==
Although the author was not a member of the co-op, 2D figures prominently in the mystery/thriller novel The Muse Asylum by David Czuchlewski.
