= Greg Bennick =

American public speaker and musician

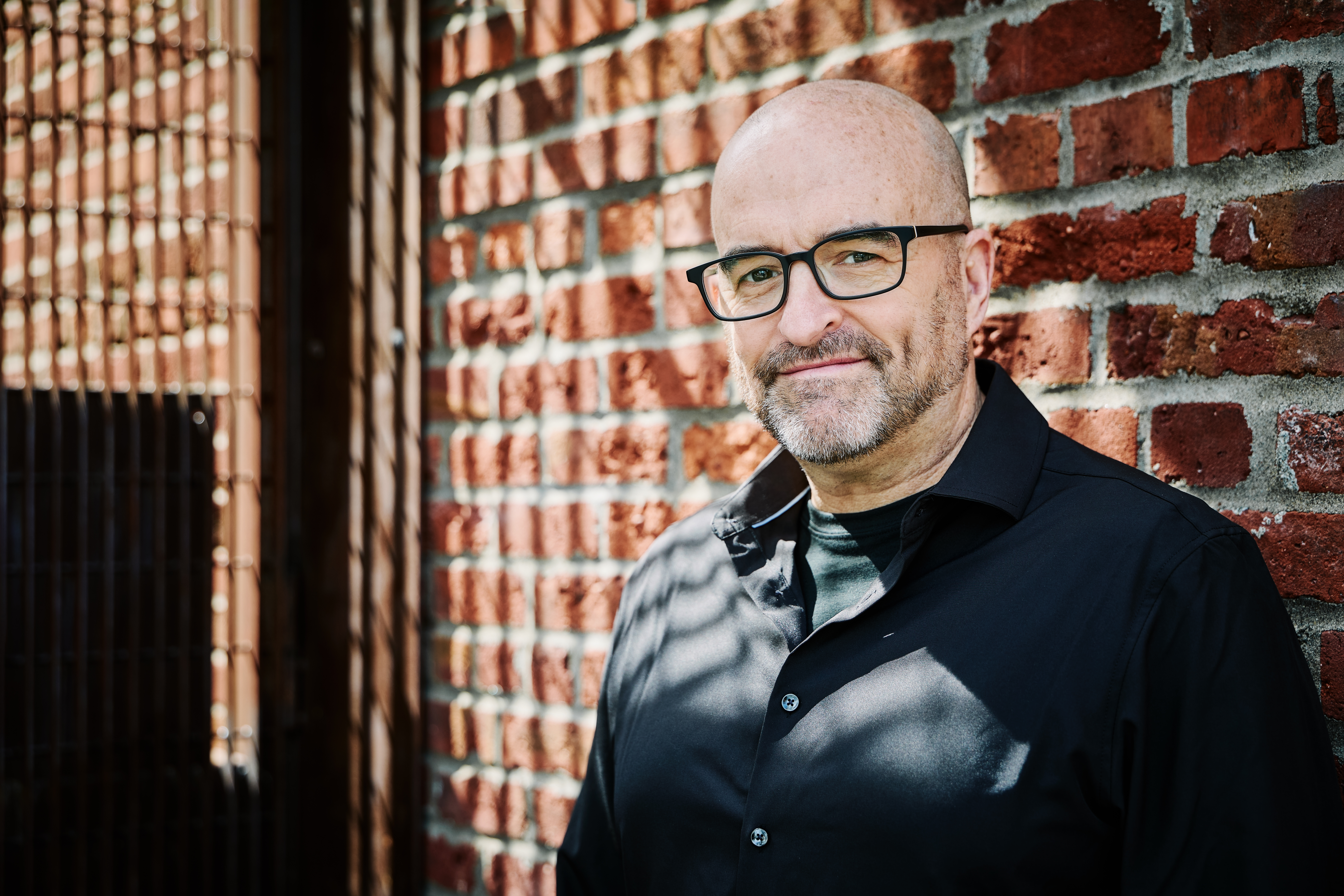
- Bennick in 2026
- Born: 1970 or 1971 (age 55–56)
- Education: Cornish College of the Arts
- Musical career
- Genre: Punk rock
- Instrument: Vocals
- Years active: 1995–present
- Member of: Trial; Between Earth & Sky; Bystander
- Website: www.gregbennick.com

Greg Bennick is an American professional speaker, film producer, numismatist, and musician. He is the co-founder of the nonprofit organizations One Hundred for Haiti and the Portland Mutual Aid Network. Bennick is also the vocalist of the bands Trial, Between Earth & Sky, and Bystander.

== Early life and education ==
Bennick grew up in Connecticut, having learned to juggle in his youth when he was accidentally placed in the wrong junior high minicourse. He had initially selected coin collecting. Bennick began earning money juggling at 13 years old.

Bennick was first introduced to punk music by a neighbourhood friend, who shared recorded cassettes of the music with him. Through the introduction, Bennick found punk bands he enjoyed and began going to shows. The first show he attended was headlined by Hüsker Dü in 1987. Bennick attended many shows at The Anthrax, a noteworthy venue in Connecticut at that time.

In 1991, Bennick moved to Seattle to study theatre at Cornish College of the Arts, where he focused on acting, Shakespeare, textual analysis, and physical theatre.

== Career ==
=== Professional speaking ===
Bennick began professional speaking as an offshoot of performing, following themes of sincerity and connection with the audience rather than traditional motivational speaking. He has previously included juggling as part of his speaking engagements. Bennick has given keynote speeches to various companies, including Microsoft and Boeing. He is represented by various speakers bureaus, including GDA Speakers, Midwest Speakers Bureau, and BigSpeak Speakers Bureau.

Bennick is the first international speaking coach for a TEDx event, appearing at TEDxPerth.

In addition to speaking events, Bennick has performed spoken word on tour in multiple countries, including traveling to Russia and Ukraine. He performed a spoken word set at Ieperfest in 2018.

=== Films ===
Bennick co-wrote and produced his first documentary, Flight from Death, with director Patrick Shen. The film explored the topic of death anxiety, something that initially intrigued Bennick through a talk based on the works and writings of cultural anthropologist and social theorist Ernest Becker, given by Sheldon Solomon, chairman of the psychology department at Skidmore College. Solomon was interviewed for the documentary as well. The film was narrated by Gabriel Byrne, and earned recognition at multiple film festivals, including the audience choice for best documentary at the Beverly Hills Film Festival.

Bennick co-produced his second documentary, The Philosopher Kings, which sought to display wisdom from custodians who worked at major universities.

Bennick is also a co-producer of La Source, a documentary that follows Josue Lajeunesse, a janitor at Princeton University, working on developing running water resources for the Haitian village of La Source.

==== Acting ====
Bennick played the role of John Luka in the 2018 film, 7 Splinters in Time. He appeared in a short film created by the same director (Gabriel Judet-Weinshel) in 1995.

=== The Legacy Project ===
Bennick and David Whitson co-founded The Legacy Project in 2006, with the purpose to “better understand how humans can transition from violent, bloody conflict to peace, justice, and reconciliation.” It began with an idea to bring a film Bennick had produced to Poland, specifically, concentration camp cities, to share it with the local people. Whitson suggested bringing high school students along to share in the experience. The organization has gone on multiple trips, including Poland in 2007, South Africa in 2008, Chile and Argentina in 2009, Canada in 2012, and South America in 2014.

=== World Leaders Project ===
Prior to the filming of Flight From Death, Bennick approached Sheldon Solomon, seeking to contact world leaders in an effort to have a dialogue about how "death anxiety perpetuated world violence." This effort would become known as the World Leaders Project.

As part of the World Leaders Project, Bennick and Solomon met with the former President of Guyana, Bharrat Jagdeo.

=== Numismatist ===
Bennick is a numismatist and collector of error coins, a practice he began when he was 10 years old. He discovered a mated pair of uncirculated 1867 Shield nickels, which were under-described in auction as a lesser error type. He serves on the board of the Combined Organization of Numismatic Error Collectors of America (CONECA).

== Music career ==
Bennick performing vocals with his band, Trial, during their 2005 reunion show in London, England.

Bennick is the vocalist for Trial, a Seattle-based punk band. The band was primarily active from 1995 to 2000, playing shows sporadically in the years following. Trial’s lyrics contain themes of personal empowerment and facing challenges. Following Trial, Bennick performed as a vocalist for the bands Between Earth & Sky and Bystander.

In 2013, Bennick hosted a workshop at Fluff Fest, focusing on writing meaningful lyrics.

== Philanthropy ==
=== One Hundred for Haiti ===
Bennick is the founder and executive director of One Hundred for Haiti, a nonprofit organization that funds development projects in the country through crowdfunded donations. After the 2010 Haiti earthquake, Bennick joined some friends to help distribute aid to those affected by the disaster, further inspiring him to create the nonprofit. Money is sent from the nonprofit to trusted individuals living in the country, and is then used to build cisterns, supplying clean water.

=== Portland Mutual Aid Network ===
Bennick is a co-founder of the Portland Mutual Aid Network, a nonprofit organization providing support to unsheltered individuals in the Portland-area.

== Bibliography ==
- Reclaim the Moment: Seven Strategies to Build a Better Now (2024) ISBN 9781394247714

== Discography ==
=== Trial ===
- Through the Darkest Days (1997)
- Are These Our Lives? (1999)

=== Bystander ===
- Where Did We Go Wrong? (2019)

== Collaborations ==
Year	Song	Album	Artist
2006	"Surgery without Sutures" (spoken word by Greg Bennick)	Mediums and Messages	Parallax
2010	The Flight of the Locust (featuring Greg Bennick)	Antarctica	To Kill
2010	"Synesthesia" (featuring Greg Bennick)	Run With the Hunted	Run With the Hunted
2014	"Владивосток" (featuring Greg Bennick)	Всё, Что Нам Нужно	Плохая Репутация
2019	"Nothing Man" (featuring Greg Bennick)	Threats of the World	Rejection Pact
2019	"Masks" (featuring Greg Bennick)	Times of Reason Cast Aside	Exterminating Angel
2019	"The Loss" (featuring Greg Bennick)	Flag of Mourning	Earthfall
2020	"Never Again" (featuring Greg Bennick)	No Peace	No Peace

== Personal life ==
Bennick participates in a straight edge lifestyle. His mother is a part-time motivational speaker.

=== Social activism ===
Bennick organized against the Teen Dance Ordinance (TDO), a controversial Seattle law which severely curtailed the ability of concert and club promoters to hold events for underaged patrons. He would go on to co-author the law’s replacement, the 2002 All-Ages Dance Ordinance, which saw eased restrictions compared to the former law. Bennick was a member of the Seattle City Council’s Music and Youth Task Force, an advisory body that made suggestions which ultimately led to the council repealing the TDO and passing the All Ages Dance Ordinance.
