= Martha Reeves (anchorite) =

British author and anchorite (1941–2026)

Martha Reeves (1941 – June 11, 2026) was a vowed Anglican solitary (or anchorite), author, and former professor of theology. She had Rowan Williams, the former Archbishop of Canterbury, as bishop-protector.

== Biography ==
She was educated at Madeira School (Class of 1959), and then studied at Stanford University. She became a professor of theology who wrote numerous articles and books under the name Maggie Ross as well as translated a number of Carthusian Novice Conferences. Reeves, at one time Desmond Tutu's spiritual director, was Bell Distinguished Professor in Anglican and Ecumenical Studies appointed to the Department of Philosophy and Religion, Kendall College of Arts and Sciences, The University of Tulsa.

In 1995, A Rite for Contemplative Eucharist emerged while she was a theologian-in-residence in an Episcopal church in the Diocese of Southern Ohio. In March 2008, she donated 'silence' to the Museum of Curiosity.. Ross as an interviewee also talked about silence in the 2015 documentary In Pursuit of Silence directed by Patrick Shen. In October 2016, she gave the lecture "Healing Silence" at Durham University for its "Spirituality, Theology, and Health Seminar Series". She talked to Rachel Kerr about silence at the Hay Festival. She was an attendee of the 2018 Epiphany Conference on science and religion, a collaborative initiative between the Cambridge Epiphany Philosophers and the Oxford Monastic Institute.

She wrote about silence in her blog. The British & Irish Association for Practical Theology (BIAPT) had a planned inaugural event for its Spirituality Interest Special Group in 2020, with Ross as keynote speaker, but was postponed. Ross published her keynote address, "Silent Ways of Knowing", on her blog.

Reeves lived in Oxford, the United Kingdom, and gave sermons and talks in churches and academia around the area.

== Selected works ==
=== Books ===
- The Fountain & the Furnace: The Way of Tears and Fire, Paulist Press (1987) ISBN 0809128403
- Seasons of Death and Life: A Wilderness Memoir, HarperCollins (1990) ISBN 0-06-067024-X
- Pillars of Flame: Power, Priesthood, and Spiritual Maturity, Seabury Books (1992, & 2007) ISBN 1-59627-064-0
- (translator from French) 'The Way of Silent Love: Carthusian Novice Conferences', A Carthusian, Cistercian Publications / Darton, Longman, & Todd (1993), ISBN 978-0879076498
- '(translator) 'The Wound of Love: A Carthusian Miscellany', A Carthusian, Cistercian Publications / Darton, Longman, & Todd (1994), ASIN B00HXFPG3Q
- '(translator) 'The Call of Silent Love: Carthusian Novice Conferences', A Carthusian, Cistercian Publications / Darton, Longman, & Todd (1995), ISBN 978-0852446713
- The Fire of Your Life, Seabury Books (2007) ISBN 1-59627-051-9
- Writing the Icon of the Heart: In Silence Beholding, The Bible Reading Fellowship (BRF, 2011), ISBN 978-1-84101-878-2
- The Fountain & the Furnace: The Way of Tears and Fire, Wipf & Stock (2014 Reprint Edition) ISBN 978-1-62564-695-8
- Silence: A User's Guide: Volume 1: Process, Wipf & Stock/Darton, Longman, & Todd (2014), ISBN 978-0232531480
- Seasons of Death and Life: A Wilderness Memoir, Wipf & Stock (2016 Reprint Edition) ISBN 978-1532601477
- Silence: A User's Guide: Volume 2: Application, Wipf & Stock/Darton, Longman, & Todd (2018), ISBN 978-0232533484

=== Journal Articles/Reviews ===
- Ross, Maggie. "Tears and Fire: Recovering a Neglected Tradition," Sobornost, 1987, Vol 9, Num 1, pp 14–23.
- _____. Review of The Syriac Fathers on Prayer and the Spiritual Life by S. Brock; Harlots of the Desert: A Study of Repentance in Early Monastic Sources by B. Ward. The Journal of Roman Studies, Vol. 80 (1990), p. 259.
- _____"The Human Experience of God at Turning Points: A Theological Exposé of Spiritual Counterfeits," Vox Benedictina Vol. 7, Iss. 4, (Oct 1990): 393.
- _____"The Apophatic Ordinary," Anglican Theological Review, Volume: 74, Issue: 4, 1992) Pages: 456-464.
- _____and Gillespie, Vincent, "The Apophatic Image: The Poetics of Effacement in Julian of Norwich," Medieval Mystical Tradition in England: Exeter Symposium 5, ( 1992): Pages 53 – 77.
- ____"Apophatic Prayer as a Theological Model: Seeking Coordinates in the Ineffable, Notes for a Quantum Theology," Literature and Theology, Vol 7 Issue 4, December 1993.
- ____"Sexuality, Otherness and the Truth of the Self," Vox Benedictina, Vol. 10, Iss. 2, (Winter 1993): 334.
- ____"The Seven Devils of Women's Ordination." Crossing the Boundary: What Will Women Priests Mean? Sue Walrond Skinner, ed. London: Mowbray, 1994, pp. 93-131.
- ____"Socrates and the Cheshire Cat, or, Abhorring Horror Vacui," The Bell Lecture, University of Tulsa, 2000.
- ____& Gillespie, Vincent, ""With Mekeness Aske Perseverantly": On Reading Julian of Norwich," Mystics Quarterly, Vol. 30, No. 3/4 (September/December 2004), pp. 126-141.
- ____"Simone Weil: Force, Fragility and the Art of Kenosis,” Colloquy XXIV, American Weil Society, The Center for Theological Inquiry, Princeton, NJ, April 2004.
- ____"Jesus in the Balance: Interpretation in the Twenty-First Century," Word & World, Vol. 29 No. 2 Spring 2009.
- ____"Behold Not the Cloud of Experience," in E.A. Jones, ed., The Medieval Mystical Tradition in England: Exeter Symposium. D.S. Brewer, Cambridge, 2013.
- ____Review of the Soul recreation. The contemplative-mystical piety of Puritanism by Tom Schwanda. The Journal of Ecclesiastical History; Cambridge Vol. 64, Iss. 2, (Apr 2013): 423-424.
- ____"Silent witness," (Reform Interview) Reform Magazine, June 2015.
- ____ "Maggie Ross, solitary and theologian." Interview by Terence Handley MacMath. Church Times, January 16, 2015.
- ____"The Costliness of Commemoration," in On Commemoration: Global Reflections upon Remembering War, Catherine Gilbert, Kate McLoughlin & Niall Munro, eds. Peter Lang Ltd, International Academic Publishers; 1st edition (August 11, 2020).
- ____Review, A History of Silence: From the Renaissance to the Present Day by Alain Corbin. Common Knowledge, Duke University Press, Volume 27 Issue 1, January 2021. p. 126.
