= Silence =

Total absence of sound

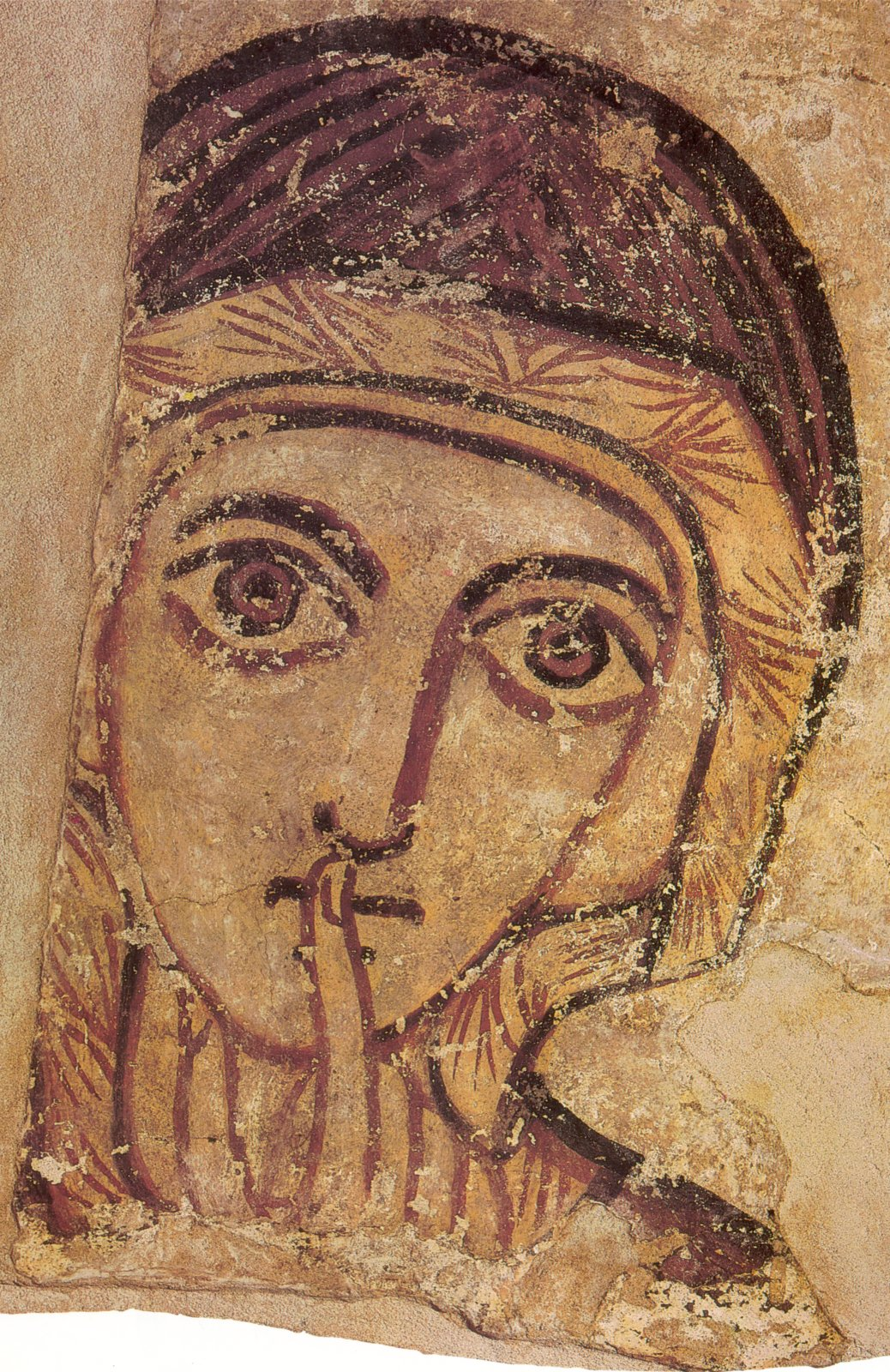
Saint Anne, Coptic tempera plaster wall painting from the 8th century

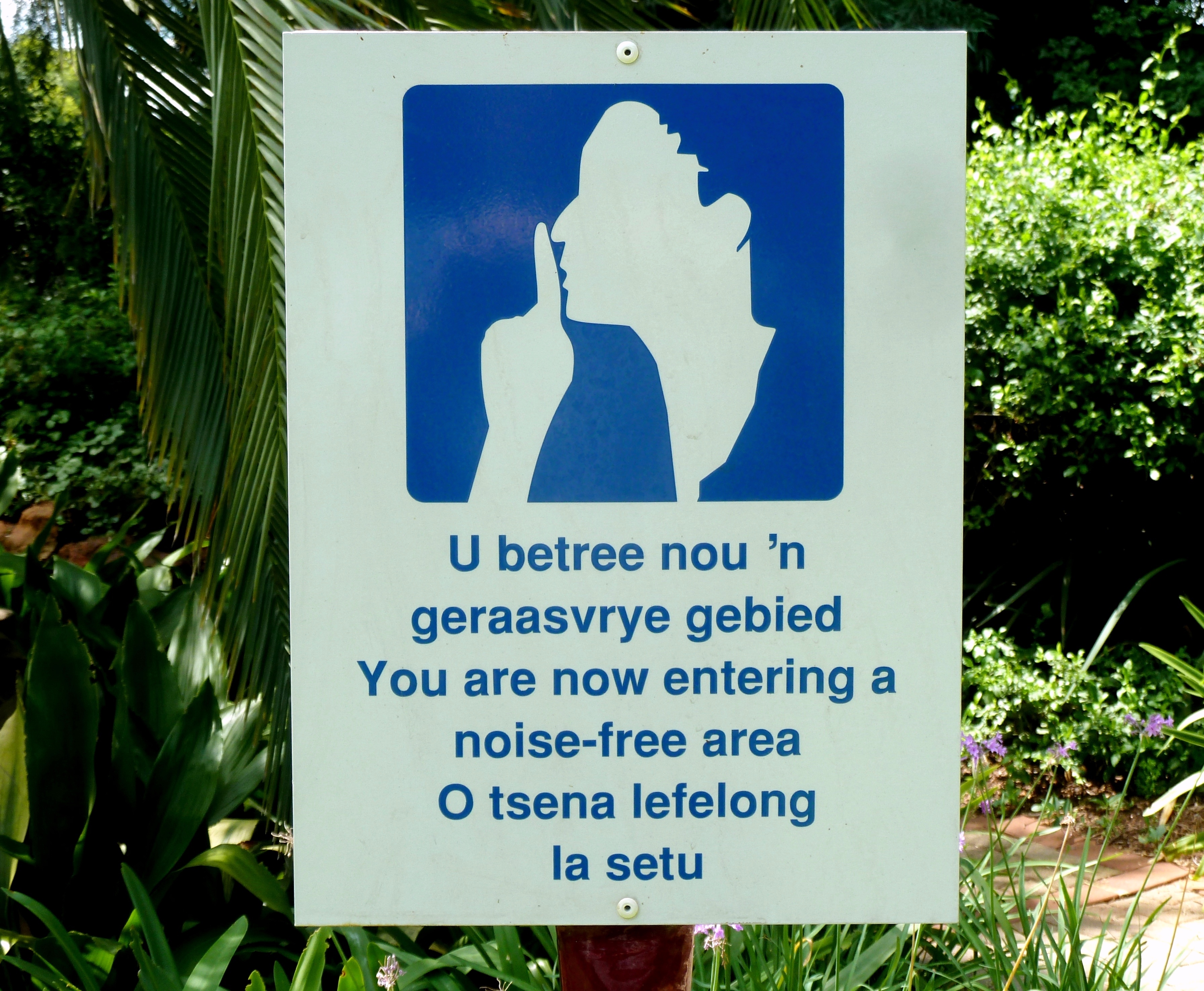
Keep silent sign in South Africa.

Silence is the absence of ambient audible sound, the emission of sounds of such low intensity that they do not draw attention to themselves, or the state of having ceased to produce sounds; this latter sense can be extended to apply to the cessation or absence of any form of communication, whether through speech or other medium. Remaining mute can be a symptom of mental illness.

Sometimes speakers fall silent when they hesitate in searching for a word, or interrupt themselves before correcting themselves. Discourse analysis shows that people use brief silences to mark the boundaries of prosodic units, in turn-taking, or as reactive tokens, for example, as a sign of displeasure, disagreement, embarrassment, desire to think, confusion, and the like. Relatively prolonged intervals of silence can be used in rituals; in some religious disciplines, people maintain silence for protracted periods, or even for the rest of their lives, as an ascetic means of spiritual transformation.

== Perception ==
In the philosophy of perception and the science of perception, there has been a longstanding controversy as to how humans experience silence: "the perceptual view (we literally hear silence), and the cognitive view (we only judge or infer silence)", with prominent theories holding the latter view. However, a study published in 2023 in the Proceedings of the National Academy of Sciences reported findings based on empirical experiments testing whether temporal distortions known to be experienced with respect to sounds, were also analogously experienced with respect to periods of silence. The experimental results in all cases suggested that, at least in this context, humans respond to moments of silence the same way as to sounds—supporting the perceptual view that humans literally hear silence.

== Rhetorical practice ==
Silence may become an effective rhetorical practice or communication tactic when people choose to be silent for a specific purpose. It has not merely been recognized as a theory but also as a phenomenon with practical advantages. When silence becomes rhetorical, it is intentional since it reflects a meaning. Rhetorical silence targets an audience rather than the rhetorician.

Strategic silence be an instrument in negotiations, debates, interpersonal relationships, and even broader social and political contexts. Its effectiveness lies in its ambiguity. It can be interpreted in a multitude of ways, fostering uncertainty and prompting introspection in the other party. This ambiguity can be leveraged to gain an advantage, create space for reflection, or even exert pressure without uttering a single word.

== Uses ==
=== History ===
Joseph Jordania has suggested that in social animals (including humans), silence can be a sign of danger. Many social animals produce seemingly haphazard sounds which are known as contact calls. These are a mixture of various sounds, accompanying the group's everyday business (for example, foraging, feeding), and they are used to maintain audio contact with the members of the group. Some social animal species communicate the signal of potential danger by stopping contact calls and freezing, without the use of alarm calls, through silence. Charles Darwin wrote about this in relation with wild horse and cattle. Jordania has further suggested that human humming could have been a contact method that early humans used to avoid silence. According to his suggestion, humans find prolonged silence distressing (suggesting danger to them). This may help explain why lone humans in relative sonic isolation feel a sense of comfort from humming, whistling, talking to themselves, or having the TV or radio on.

=== Spirituality ===
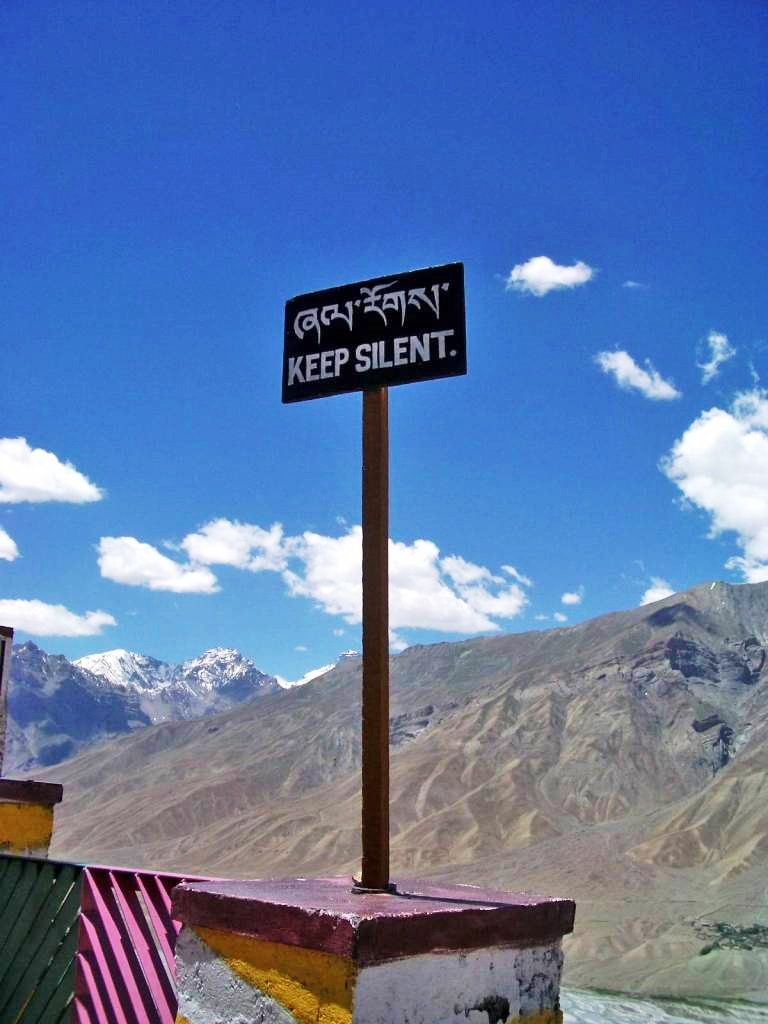
Keep Silent sign, Key Monastery, Spiti, Himachal Pradesh

"Silence" in spirituality is often a metaphor for inner stillness. A silent mind, freed from the onslaught of thoughts and thought patterns, is both a goal and an important step in spiritual development. Such "inner silence" is not about the absence of sound; instead, it is understood to bring one in contact with the divine, the ultimate reality, or one's own true self, one's divine nature. Many religious traditions imply the importance of being quiet and still in mind and spirit for transformative and integral spiritual growth to occur. In Christianity, there is the silence of contemplative prayer such as centering prayer and Christian meditation, and there are periods of reverent silence during liturgical celebrations. In some traditions of Quakerism, communal silence is the usual context of worship meetings, in patient expectancy for the divine to speak in the heart and mind. In Islam, there are the wisdom writings of the Sufis who insist on the importance of finding silence within. In Buddhism, the descriptions of silence and allowing the mind to become silent are implied as a feature of spiritual enlightenment. In Hinduism, including the teachings of Advaita Vedanta and the many paths of yoga, teachers insist on the importance of silence, Mauna, for inner growth. Ramana Maharishi, a revered Hindu sage, said, "The only language able to express the whole truth is silence." Pirkei Avot, the Jewish Sages guide for living, states that, "Tradition is a safety fence to Torah, tithing a safety fence to wealth, vows a safety fence for abstinence; a safety fence for wisdom ... is silence." In the Baháʼí Faith, Baha'u'llah said in "Words of Wisdom", "the essence of true safety is to observe silence". Eckhart Tolle says that silence can be seen either as the absence of noise, or as the space in which sound exists, just as inner stillness can be seen as the absence of thought, or the space in which thoughts are perceived.

=== Commemoration ===
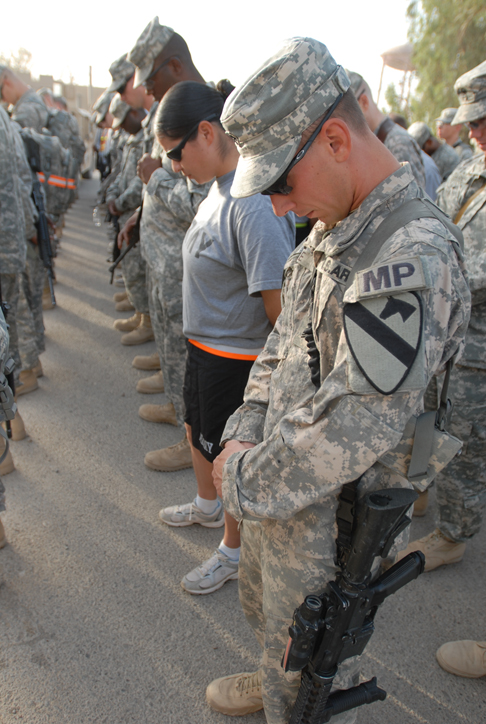
Soldiers bow their heads during a moment of silence before going on a commemorative march on Forward Operating Base Warrior, Kirkuk, Iraq, September 11. The march gave the opportunity to reflect on the tragedy that happened eight years prior.

A common way to remember a tragic incident and to remember the victims or casualties of such an event is a commemorative moment of silence.

=== Debate ===
Argumentative silence is the rhetorical practice of saying nothing when an opponent in a debate expects something to be said. Poorly executed, it can be offensive, like refusing to answer a direct question. A well-timed silence can throw an opponent off and give the debater the upper hand.

An argument from silence (Latin: argumentum ex silentio) is an argument based on the assumption that someone's silence on a matter suggests (an informal fallacy) that person's ignorance of the matter. In general, ex silentio refers to the claim that the absence of something demonstrates the proof of a proposition.

=== Law ===
The right to silence is a legal protection enjoyed by people undergoing police interrogation or trial in certain countries. The law is either explicit or recognized in many legal systems.

=== Film ===
The documentary film In Pursuit of Silence (2015) portrays the spiritual and physical benefits of silence, as well as the price paid individually and collectively for a noisy world. It is narrated by authors Helen Lees (Silence in Schools), Pico Iyer (The Art of Stillness), Susan Cain (Quiet), Maggie Ross (Silence: A User's Guide), and George Prochnik (In Pursuit of Silence).

=== Music ===
Music inherently depends on silence, in some form or another, to distinguish other periods of sound and allow dynamics, melodies, and rhythms to have greater impact. For example, most music scores feature rests, which denote periods of silence. In addition, silence in music can be seen as a time for contemplation. The audience feels the effects of the previous notes and melodies, and can intentionally reflect on what they have heard. Silence does not hinder musical excellence but can enhance the sounds of instruments and vocals within a given musical composition.

In his book Sound and Silence (1970), the composer John Paynter says, "the dramatic effect of silence has long been appreciated by composers." He gives as an example "the general pause in the middle of the chorus 'Have lightnings and thunders …' in Bach's St. Matthew Passion":

Bach, "Sind Blitze, sind Donner" (chorus) from the St. Matthew Passion.

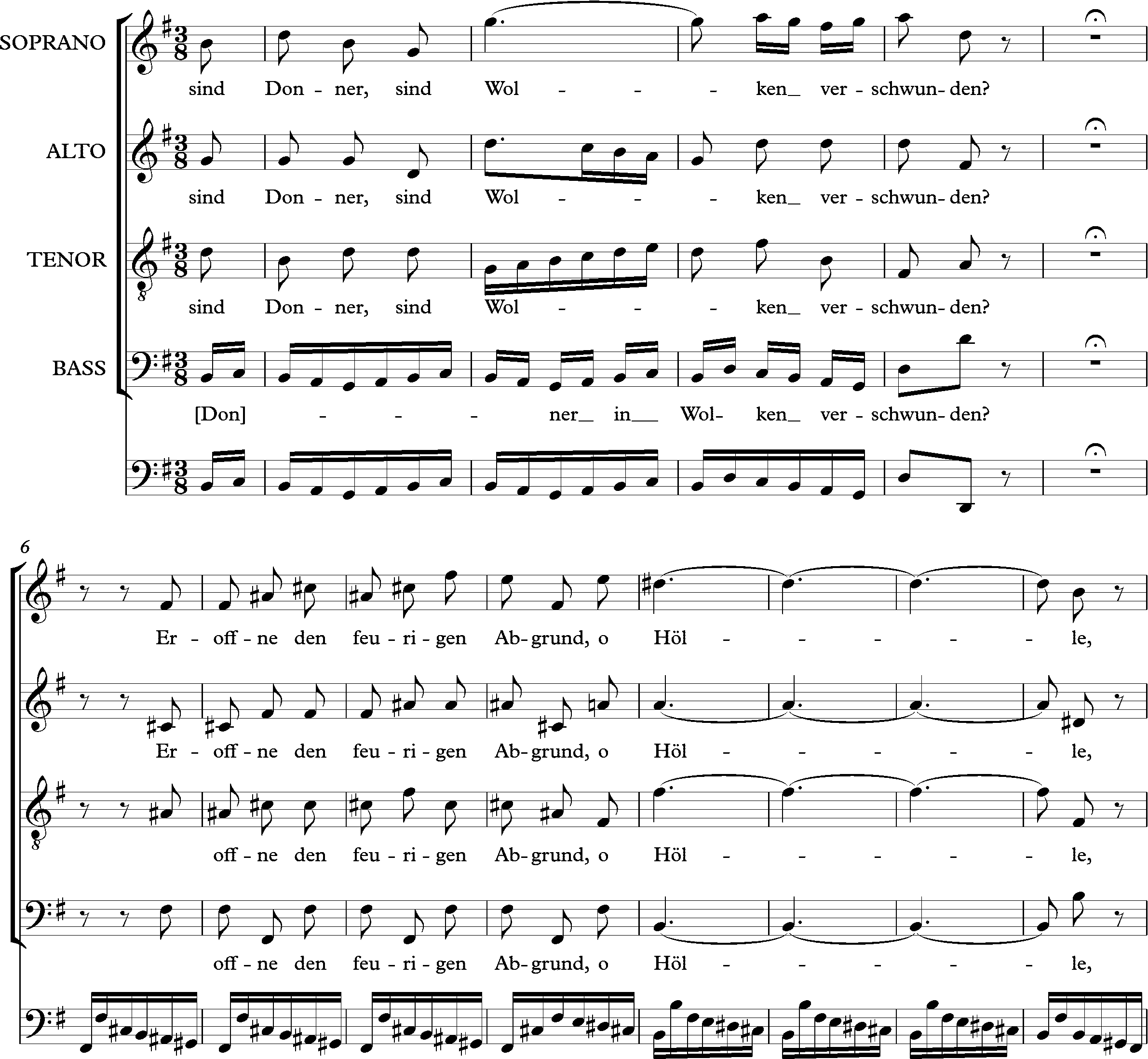
"Sind Blitze, sind Donner" (chorus) from the St. Matthew Passion.

After the pause, the music continues to the words: "Open up the fiery bottomless pit, O hell!" The silence is intended to communicate a momentary sensation of terror, of staring into unfathomable darkness. Another example of a dramatic silence comes in the "rest full of tension" at the climactic ending of the Hallelujah chorus in Handel's Messiah:

Handel, Hallelujah Chorus closing bars

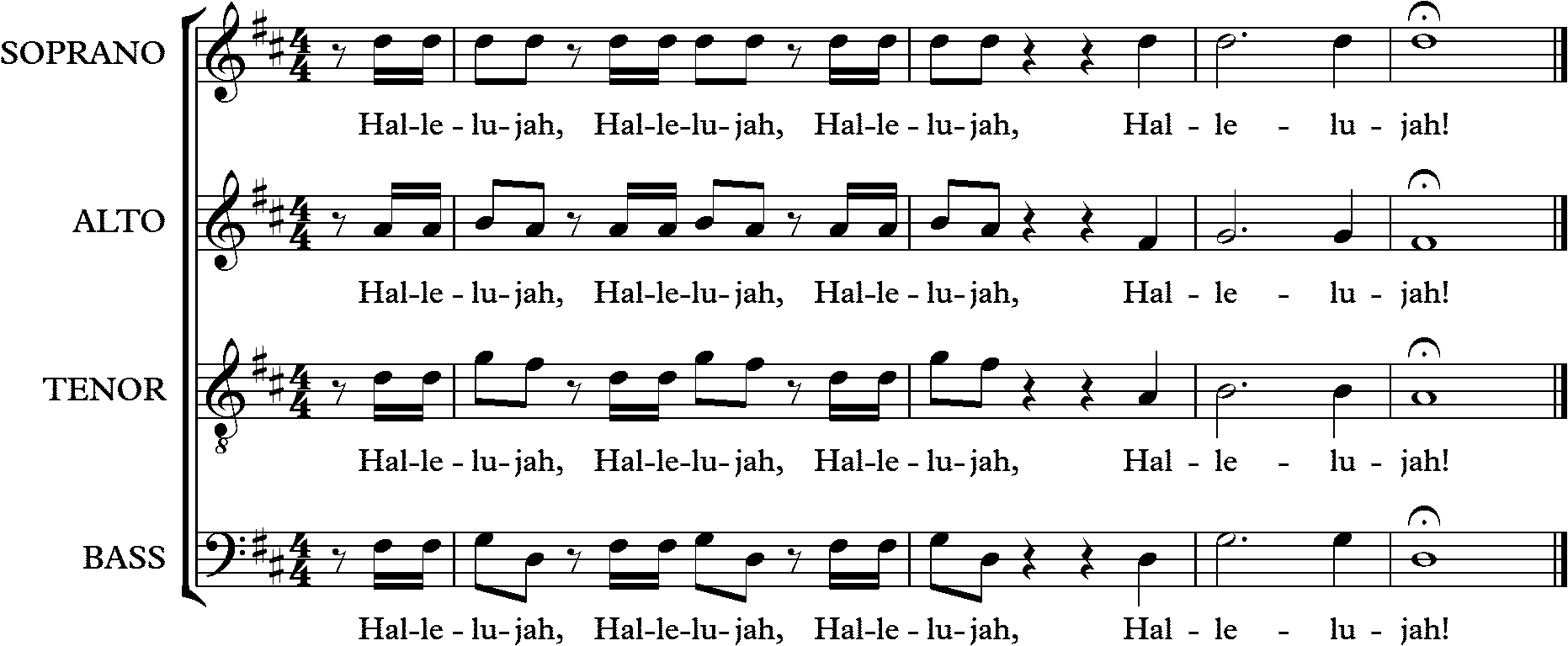
Handel, Hallelujah Chorus closing bars

Musical silences may also convey humour. Haydn's Quartet in E flat, Op. 33 was nicknamed "The Joke", because of the comic timing of the pauses at the end of the last movement:

The closing bars of String Quartet in E flat, Op. 33 by Haydn

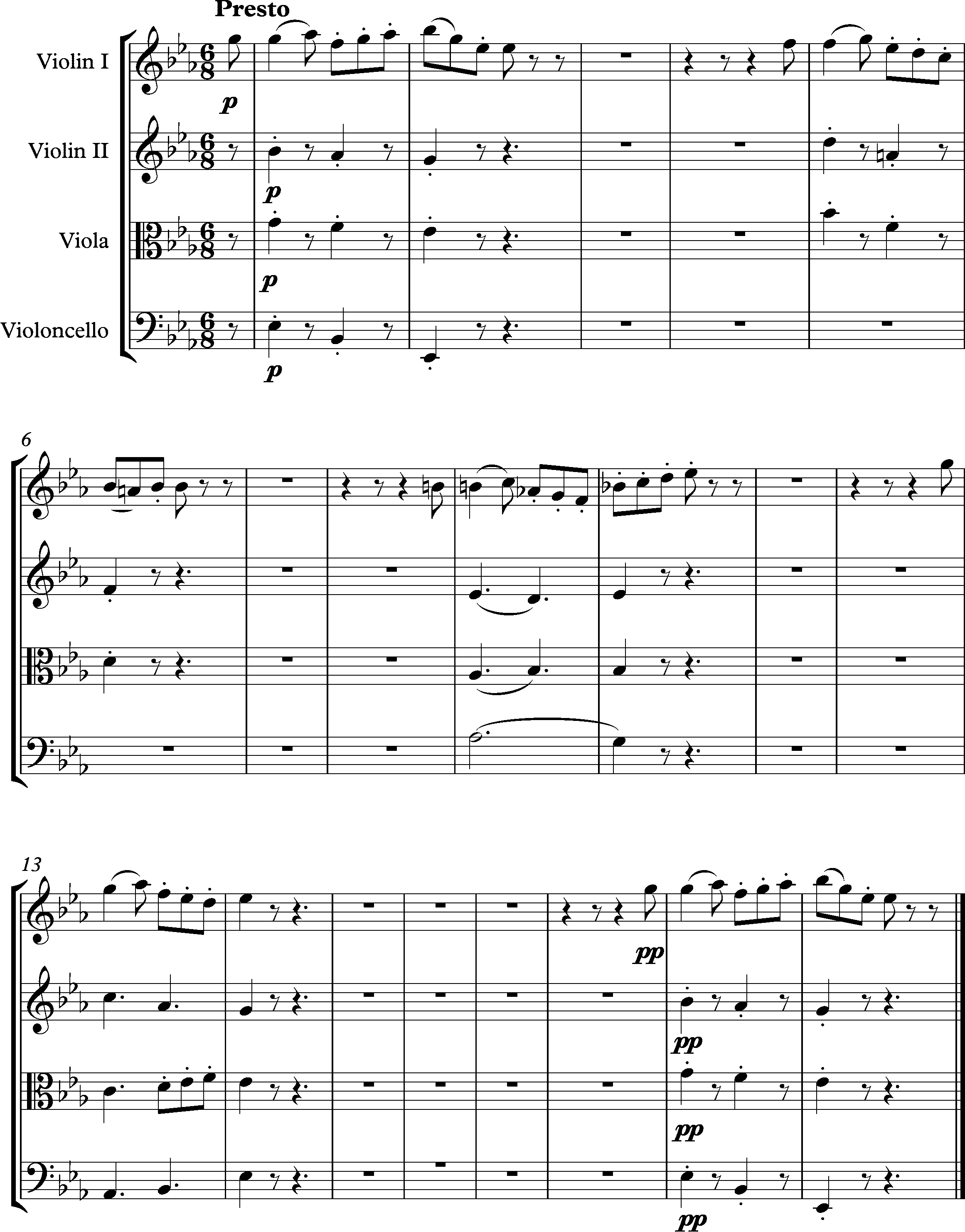
The closing bars of String Quartet in E flat, Op. 33 by Haydn.

Taruskin (2010, p. 552) says, "whenever this ending is performed, it takes the audience an extra second or so to recover its wits and realize that the piece is indeed over. The result is an inevitable giggle—the same giggle that overtakes a prestidigitator's audience when it realizes that it has been 'had'."

Barry Cooper (2011, p. 38) writes extensively of Beethoven's many uses of silence for contemplation, for dramatic effect and especially for driving the rhythmic impetus of the music. He cites the start of the second movement of the Ninth Symphony, where the silences contribute to a powerful sense of propulsion: "The rhythm of bar 1 is incomplete and demands a note at the beginning of bar 2. The substitution of such a note by a whole-bar rest therefore gives the effect of a suppressed sound, as if one were about to speak but then refrains at the last moment. The 'suppressed sound' is then repeated in bar 4, and 'developed' (by being doubled) in bars 7 and 8." writes of the "strange irregularity of rhythm in the sixth bar" of this movement.

The opening bars of the scherzo from Beethoven's ninth symphony

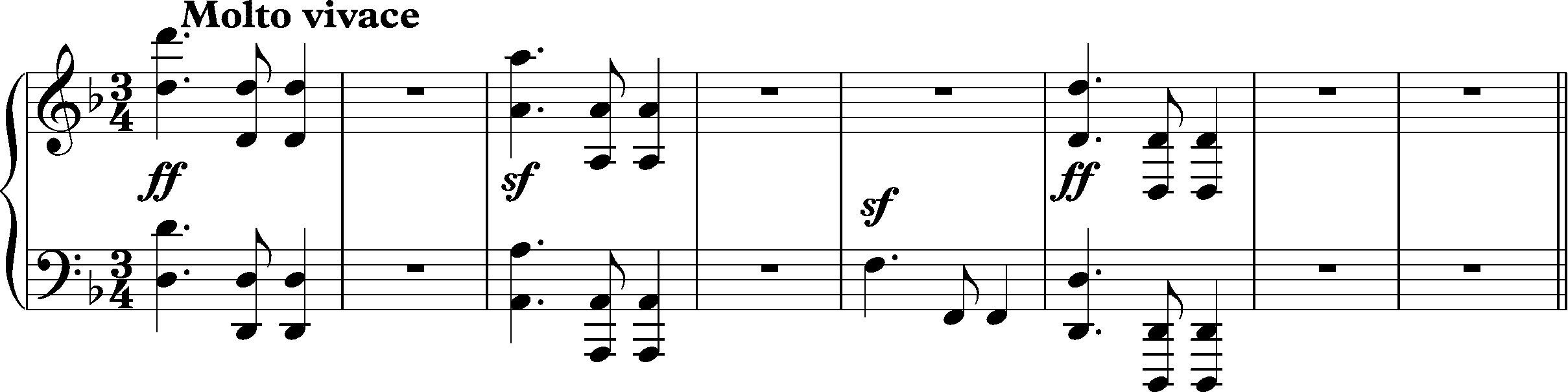
The opening bars of the scherzo from Beethoven's ninth symphony.

Robert Schumann's song "Ich hab' im Traum geweinet" from his song cycle Dichterliebe uses silence to convey an almost gothic ambiance, suggesting the darkness of the grave where the dreaming poet imagines his lover has been placed: "I wept in my dreams, I dreamt you were lying in your grave."

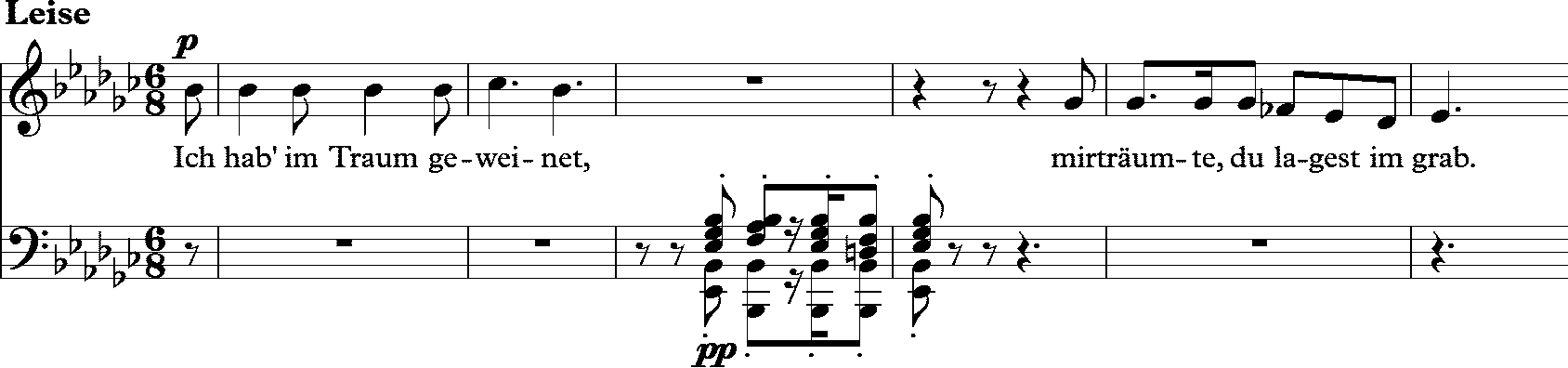
Schumann, "Ich hab' im Traum geweinet", from Dichterliebe.

In his book advising pianists and singers about interpretation, the pianist Gerald Moore stresses the need to fully observe the precisely notated rests, especially in the fourth bar above "where nothing is happening, that is to say nothing except a silence, a pregnant silence which, if shortened, dissipates the suffering it is intended to convey."

Much has been said about the harmony of the opening to Wagner's opera Tristan und Isolde, which Taruskin (2010, p. 540) calls "perhaps the most famous, surely the most commented-on, single phrase of music ever written." His strategic use of silences between phrases intensifies the troubled ambiguity of the music: "The chord that fills the ensuing silence in the listener's inner ear… is the unstated – indeed never to be stated, and ultimately needless to be stated – tonic of that key."

Wagner, Tristan Prelude, opening

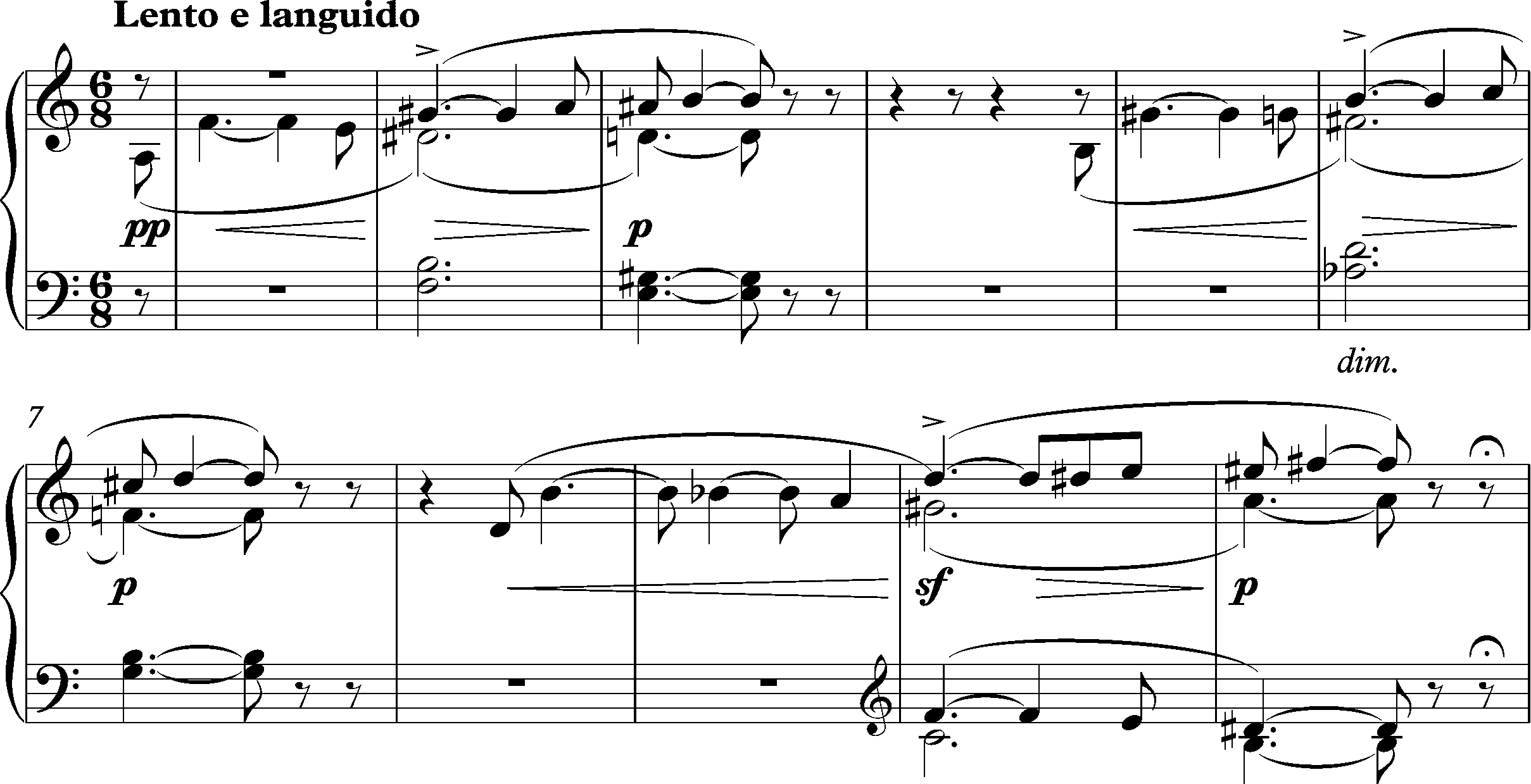
Wagner, Prelude to Tristan and Isolde, opening bars.

Some of the most effective musical silences are very short, lasting barely a fraction of a second. In the spirited and energetic finale of his Symphony No. 2, Brahms uses silences at several points to powerfully disrupt the rhythmic momentum that has been building. (See also syncopation.)

Brahms Symphony No. 2, finale, bars 135-142

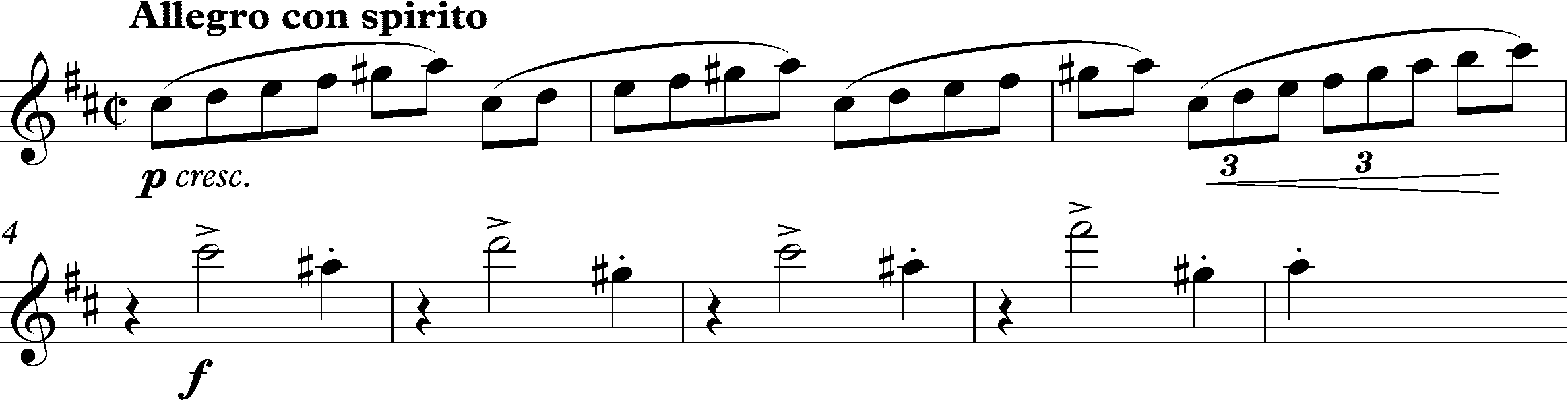
Brahms Symphony No. 2 finale, bars 135-142

During the 20th century, composers explored further the expressive potential of silence in their music. The contemplative concluding bars of Anton Webern's Symphony (1928) and Stravinsky's Les Noces The Wedding, 1923) make telling and atmospheric use of pauses. Eric Walter White (1947, p. 74) describes the ending of Les Noces as follows: "As the voices cease singing, pools of silence come flooding in between the measured strokes of the bell chord, and the music dies away in a miraculously fresh and radiant close."

John Paynter (1970, p. 24) vividly conveys how silence contributes to the titanic impact of the third section of Messiaen's orchestral work Et exspecto resurrectionem mortuorum (1964):

Woodwinds jump, growl and shriek. Silence. Eight solemn bell strokes echo and die. Again silence. Suddenly the brasses blare, and out of the trombones' awesome processional grows a steady roar … the big gongs the tam-tam beaten in a long and powerful resonance, shattering and echoing across mountains and along valleys. This is music of the high hills, music for vast spaces: 'The hour is coming when the dead will hear the voice of the Son of God'. We can feel the awe and the majesty of the High Alps and the great churches. The instrumental sounds are vast the silences are deep. The words of St John are alive in the music, and through these sounds Messiaen reveals himself and his vision.

An extreme example from 1952 is 4′33″, an experimental musical work by avant-garde composer John Cage, incorporating ambient sounds not foreseeable by the composer. Though first performed on the piano, the piece was composed for any instrument or instruments and is structured in three movements. The length of each movement is not fixed by the composer, but the total length of the combination of three movements is. The score instructs the performer(s) to remain silent throughout the piece. There are telling examples of the use of silence in jazz. A frequently used effect, known as "stop-time", places silences at moments where listeners or dancers might expect a strong beat, contributing to the syncopation. Scott Joplin's Rag-Time Dance (1902) features stop-time silences:

Scott Joplin, from the Rag-Time Dance (1902)

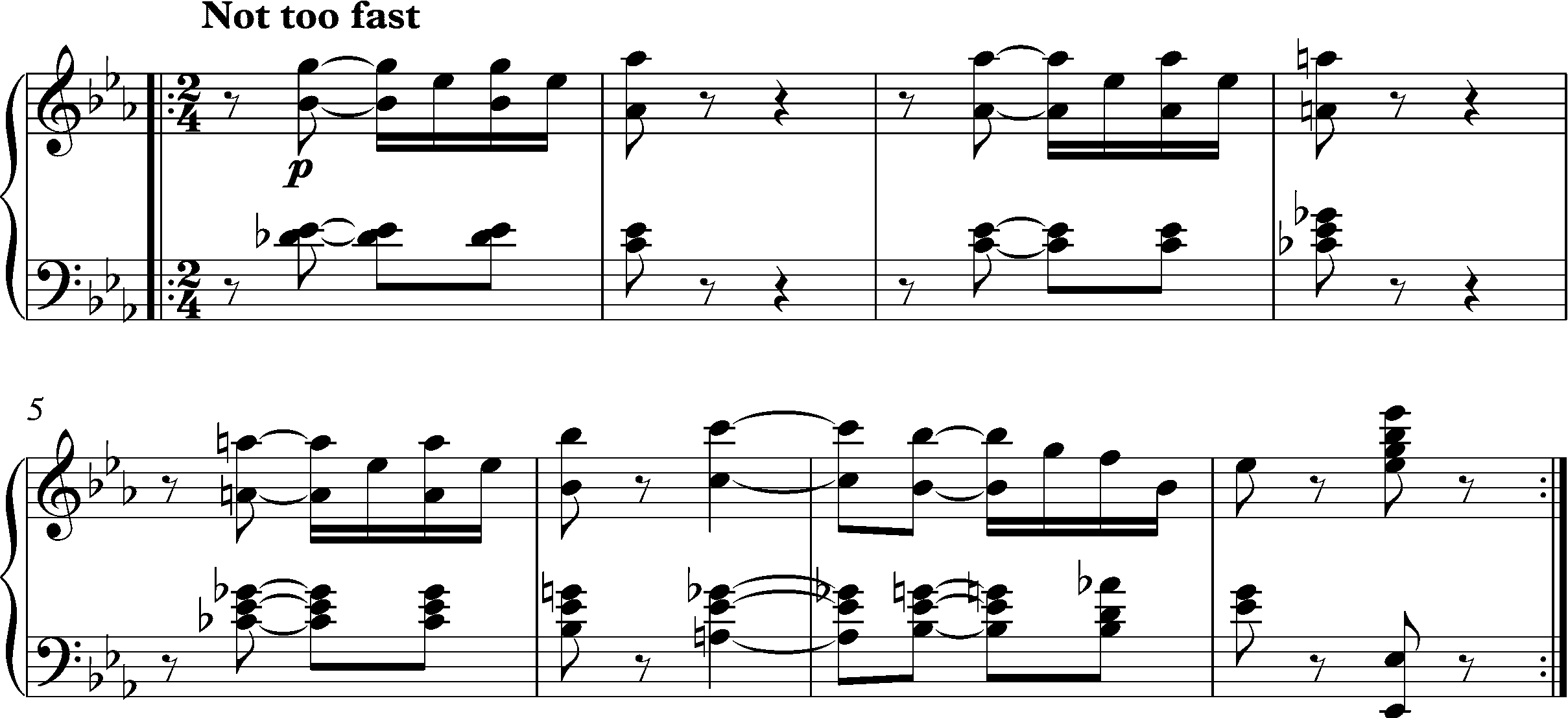
Scott Joplin, Rag-Time Dance (1902)

Early recordings of the Rag Time Dance follow Joplin's instructions as follows: "To get the desired effect of 'Stop Time', the pianist will please stamp the heel of one foot heavily upon the floor." Later recordings disregard this direction – the regular beat is implied rather than stated and the silences are more palpable. Keith Swanwick (1979, p. 70) is enchanted by the "playfulness and humour" engendered by the stop-time effects in Jelly Roll Morton's solo piano recording of The Crave (1939): "If we listen to this, tapping or clicking along with the beat, we shalt find ourselves surprised by two patches of silence near the end. The beat goes on but the sound stops. The effect is something like being thrown forward when a car stops suddenly. It is the biggest surprise in an engaging piece of music full of little deviations (syncopations) from the repeated beat."

Other examples include the closing bars of Louis Armstrong's recording of Struttin' with Some Barbecue (1928) and the hair's-breadth pause at the end of pianist Bill Evans' solo on Miles Davis' recording of On Green Dolphin Street (1959). Duke Ellington's "Madness in Great Ones", from his Shakespearean Suite Such Sweet Thunder (1957) conveys the feigned madness of Prince Hamlet through abrupt and unpredictable pauses that interrupt the flow of the music. The reggae band Black Slate had a hit in 1980 with the song Amigo. The instrumental introduction features sudden silences before the voice enters.

== See also ==
- Anechoic chamber
- Awkward silence
- Background noise
- Blue Code of Silence
- Dead air
- Hesychia
- List of silent musical compositions
- Murke's Collected Silences
- Muteness
- Noble Silence
- Omertà
- Radio silence
- Retreat
- Silencer (disambiguation)
- Silent film
- Silent letter
- Speech is silver, silence is golden
- Spiral of silence
- Shunning
