= Love's Body =

1966 book by Norman O. Brown

- Cover of the first edition
- Author: Norman O. Brown
- Language: English
- Subject: Philosophy
- Publisher: Random House
- Publication date: 1966
- Publication place: United States
- Media type: Print (hardcover and paperback)
- Pages: 276
- ISBN: 978-0520071063

Love's Body is a 1966 book about philosophy by the American classicist Norman O. Brown. The work develops themes explored by Brown in his previous book, Life Against Death (1959). The book was first published in the United States by Random House.

== Summary ==
Brown describes Love's Body as a continuation of his project in his previous work, Life Against Death (1959), noting that its themes were foreshadowed by the last chapter of that work, "The Resurrection of the Body". In Love's Body, Brown discusses the work of Sigmund Freud, the founder of psychoanalysis, in relation to philosophy and the theory of the social contract. The book is a critique of the Western tradition of political thought, and argues that the body, rather than reason or the mind, is the key to understanding human nature and society. He compares Freud's views in Moses and Monotheism (1939) to those of the philosopher Sir Robert Filmer in Patriarcha (1680), arguing that Freud and Filmer both identified "patriarchy and monarchy, political and paternal power." He also discusses the philosopher John Locke.

In Love's Body Brown argues that Western society is dominated by a mind-body dualism, in which the body is seen as inferior to the mind, and that this dualism is responsible for many of the ills of modern society, including war, repression, and alienation. The book also explores the idea of a "polymorphous perversity" which is the idea that human sexuality is not fixed and can take many different forms.

Love's Body also explores the relationship between love, sexuality and politics. Brown's argument is that the repression of the body and sexuality is rooted in the political structures of society, and that the liberation of the body and sexuality is necessary for true political freedom.

== Publication history ==
Love's Body was first published in 1966 by Random House. The book was republished in 1990 by the University of California Press.

== Reception ==
Love's Body was criticized by the philosopher Herbert Marcuse in the February 1967 issue of Commentary. Marcuse criticized Brown's use of religious symbolism, arguing that while Brown tried to give it a sexual significance, it resulted in the "spiritualization of sexuality" and the reduction of sexuality to something symbolic. Brown's reply to Marcuse appeared in the March 1967 issue of Commentary.

The author Sam Keen noted that Love's Body is very different in approach and style from Life Against Death, in that it abandoned "rational arguments" for "aphorism, poetry, and free association". Brown commented that while writing Love's Body, he felt an obligation to "undo what I had done in Life Against Death" and to "release any followers I had acquired or at least to confuse them". The historian Paul Robinson maintained that Love's Body reveals that psychoanalysis was only a stage in Brown's development toward religious mysticism. He observed that while the book contains "a racy (and confusing) display of sexual rhetoric", its erotic language is "largely metaphorical". He argued that Love's Body made explicit the "antipolitical assumptions" implicit in Life Against Death.

The critic Camille Paglia identified Love's Body as "one of the most famous and influential books of my college years."

An issue of Kirkus from 1966 delivered a mixed review stating that: "The work, therefore, despite Brown's immense erudition and rhetorical brilliance, is a failure. But even as a failure, it may be recommended to the literate reader as a splendidly conceived intellectual gymnastic."
