= Whitman College, Princeton University =

Residential college at Princeton University

Whitman College
- Residential college
- Princeton University
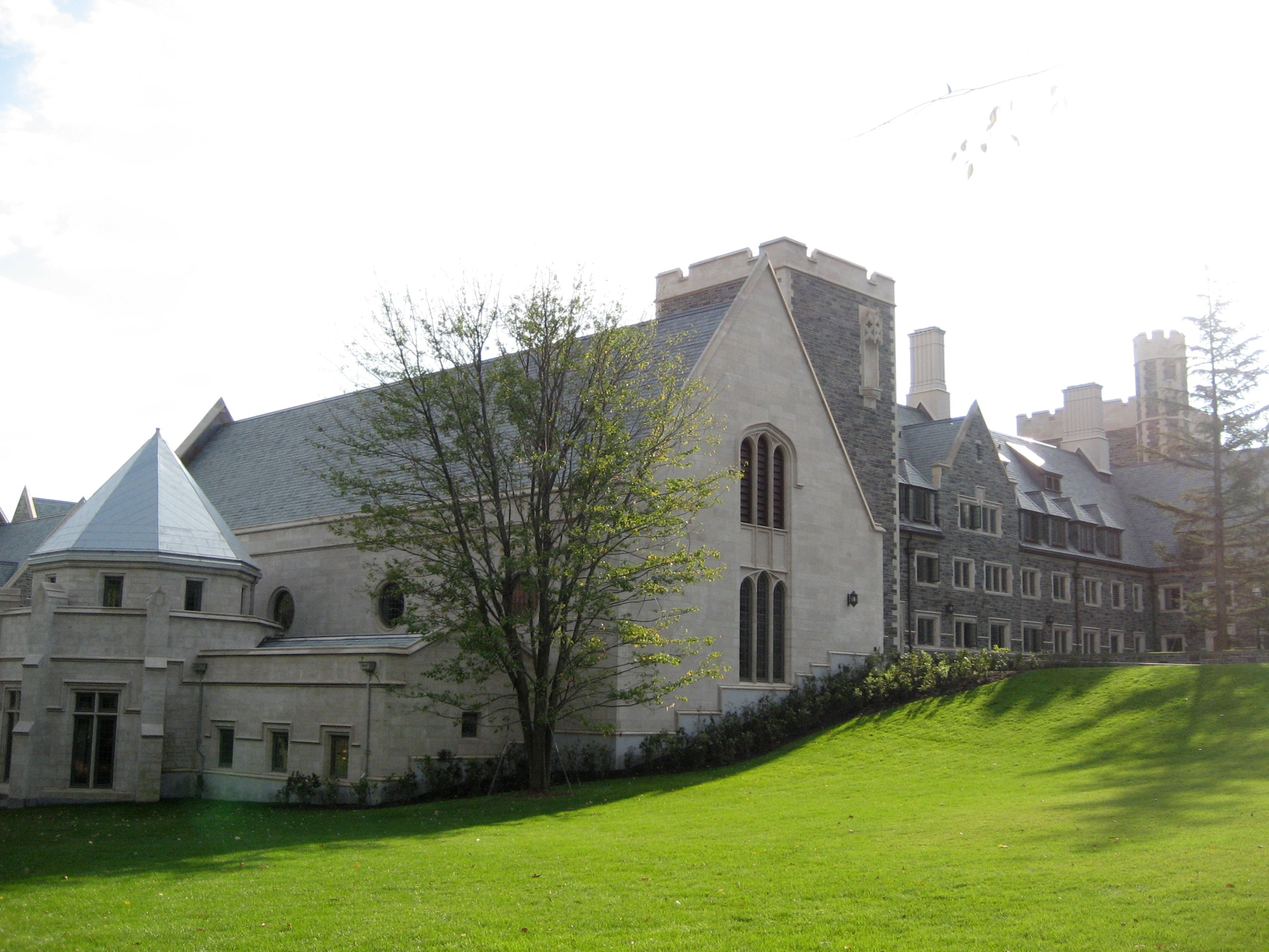

- Coordinates: 40°20′38″N 74°39′29″W
- Established: 2007
- Named for: Meg Whitman
- Head: Claire Gmachl
- Dean: Jaclyn Schwalm
- Website: whitmancollege.princeton.edu

Whitman College is one of seven residential colleges at Princeton University, New Jersey, United States. The college is named after Meg Whitman, a former CEO of eBay, who donated $30 million to build the college. The structures were designed by the architect Demetri Porphyrios, the winner of the 2004 Driehaus Prize. Whitman College was completed in the fall of 2007, and first occupied during the 2007–08 academic year.

Whitman is a four-year residential college, open to students of all four academic classes. Its sister college is Forbes College. Although it is possible for any upperclassman to live in Whitman, priority for housing room draw is given to those upperclassmen who lived in either Whitman or Forbes as underclassmen.

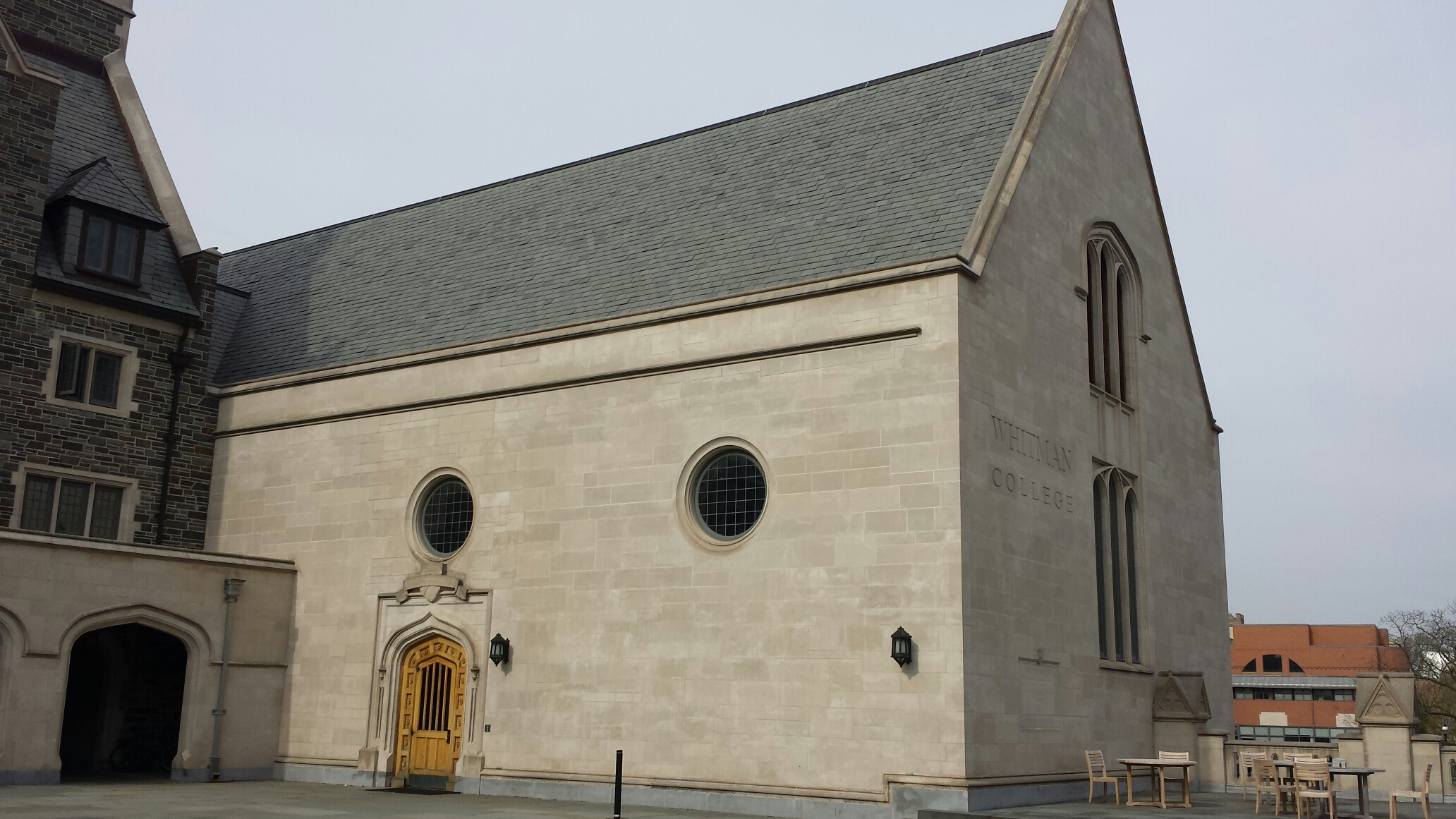
Whitman College

The head of Whitman is Claire F. Gmachl; she is the Eugene Higgins Professor of Electrical Engineering at Princeton University. The Dean is Jaclyn Schwalm. The Assistant Dean/Director of Studies is Matthew Newmam, the Assistant Dean/Director of Student Life is Momo Wolapaye, the Program Administrator is Kristin Frasier, and the Office Coordinator is Sara Krause. Josue Lajeunesse, a custodian at Whitman College, is a main subject of the documentary film The Philosopher Kings, and is also an active humanitarian working to make clean water accessible to the people of his home village of Lasource, Haiti.

The residential college comprises seven dormitories: Baker Hall, Hargadon Hall, Fisher Hall, Lauritzen Hall, Class of 1981 Hall, Murley-Pivirotto Family Tower, and Wendell Hall. The college's dining hall is called Community Hall, so named not for the University community but rather after the eBay community.

Whitman College participates in seasonal intramural athletics, including soccer, volleyball and Ultimate Frisbee. Whitman also organizes a variety of other recreational activities, including a craft circle and the Jane Austen literary society.

In 2007, the college was criticized in a Bloomberg Businessweek article for its "over-the-top comforts."

"It's only fitting that Whitman College, Princeton's new student residence, is named for eBay CEO Meg Whitman, because it's a billionaire's mansion in the form of a dorm... Each student room has triple-glazed mahogany casement windows made of leaded glass. The dining hall boasts a 35-foot ceiling gabled in oak and a 'state of the art servery.' By the time the 10-building complex in the Collegiate Gothic style opened in August, it had cost Princeton $136 million... Gold-plating new dorms raises issues of taste and donor ego. More than before, impressionable students and ambitious parents have come to view college as a form of conspicuous consumption."
