= Kazmaier =

Kazmaier is a surname. Notable people with the name Kazmaier include:

- Bill Kazmaier (born 1953), American powerlifter, strongman, and wrestler
- Dick Kazmaier (1930–2013), American football player
- Linn Kazmaier (born 2006), German biathlete
- Patty Kazmaier-Sandt (1962–1990), American ice hockey player

== See also ==
- Patty Kazmaier Award, award for the top American female college ice hockey player, named for Patty Kazmaier-Sandt
