= The Denial of Death =

1973 book by Ernest Becker

- Cover of the first edition
- Author: Ernest Becker
- Language: English
- Subject: Death, heroism
- Publisher: Free Press
- Publication date: December 31, 1973
- Publication place: United States
- Media type: Print (hardcover and paperback)
- Pages: 336
- ISBN: 9780684832401

The Denial of Death is a 1973 book by American cultural anthropologist Ernest Becker which discusses the psychological and philosophical implications of how people and cultures have reacted to the concept of death. The author argues most human action is taken to ignore or avoid the inevitability of death.

It was awarded the Pulitzer Prize for General Nonfiction in 1974, two months after the author's death. It is the main work responsible for the development of terror management theory, which provides empirical support for Becker's ideas.

== Table of contents ==
- Preface
- Chapter One: Introduction: Human Nature and the Heroic
- PART I: THE DEPTH PSYCHOLOGY OF HEROISM
  - Chapter Two: The Terror of Death
  - Chapter Three: The Recasting of Some Basic Psychoanalytic Ideas
  - Chapter Four: Human Character as a Vital Lie
  - Chapter Five: The Psychoanalyst Kierkegaard
  - Chapter Six: The Problem of Freud's Character, Noch Einmal
- PART II: THE FAILURES OF HEROISM
  - Chapter Seven: The Spell Cast by Persons - The Nexus of Unfreedom
  - Chapter Eight: Otto Rank and the Closure of Psychoanalysis on Kierkegaard
  - Chapter Nine: The Present Outcome of Psychoanalysis
  - Chapter Ten: A General View of Mental Illness
- PART III: RETROSPECT AND CONCLUSION: THE DILEMMAS OF HEROISM
  - Chapter Eleven: Psychology and Religion: What Is the Heroic Individual?
- References
- Index

Note: Beginning with the 1997 printing, subsequent editions include a new foreword by Sam Keen.

== Background ==
Becker himself claimed that: "In The Denial of Death I argued that man's innate and all-encompassing fear of death drives him to attempt to transcend death through culturally standardized hero systems and symbols."

A premise of The Denial of Death is that human civilization is a defense mechanism against the knowledge of our mortality. In turn, an individual's character is essentially formed around the process of denying one's own mortality, that this denial is a necessary component of functioning in the world, and that this character-armor masks and obscures genuine self-knowledge. Becker would later highlight, in his book Escape from Evil (1975), that much of the evil in the world was a consequence of this need to deny death.

Becker argues that a basic duality in human life exists between the physical world of objects and biology, and a symbolic world of human meaning. Thus, since humanity has a dualistic nature consisting of a physical self and a symbolic self, we are able to transcend the dilemma of mortality by focusing our attention mainly on our symbolic selves, i.e. our culturally based self esteem, which Becker calls "heroism": a "defiant creation of meaning" expressing "the myth of the significance of human life" as compared to other animals. This counters the personal insignificance and finitude that death represents in the human mind.

Such symbolic self-focus takes the form of an individual's "causa sui project", (sometimes called an "immortality project", or a "heroism project"). A person's "causa sui project" acts as their immortality vessel, whereby they subscribe to a particular set of culturally-created meanings and through them gain personal significance beyond that afforded to other mortal animals. This enables the individual to imagine at least some vestige of those meanings continuing beyond their own life-span; thus avoiding the complete "self-negation" we perceive when other biological creatures die in nature.

By being part of symbolic constructs with more significance and longevity than one's body—cultural activities and beliefs—one can gain a sense of legacy or (in the case of religion) an afterlife. In other words, by living up to (or especially exceeding) cultural standards, people feel they can become part of something eternal: something that will never die as compared to their physical body. This feeling that their lives have meaning, a purpose, and significance in the grand scheme of things i.e. that they are "heroic contributors to world life" and thus that their contributions last beyond their biological lifespan is what's referred to as an "immortality project".

Immortality projects are one way that people manage death anxiety. Some people, however, will engage in hedonic pursuits like drugs, alcohol, and entertainment to escape their death anxiety—often to compensate for a lack of "heroism" or culturally based self-esteem—resulting in a lack of contribution to the "immortality project". Others will try to manage the terror of death by "tranquilizing themselves with the trivial" i.e. strongly focusing on trivial matters and exaggerating their importance — often through busyness and frenetic activity. Becker describes the current prevalence of hedonism and triviality as a result of the downfall of religious worldviews such as Christianity that could take "slaves, cripples... imbeciles... the simple and the mighty" and allow them all to accept their animal nature in the context of a spiritual reality and an afterlife.

Humanity's traditional "hero-systems", such as religion, are no longer convincing in the age of reason. Becker argues that the loss of religion leaves humanity with impoverished resources for necessary illusions. Science attempts to serve as an immortality project, something that Becker believes it can never do because it is unable to provide agreeable, absolute meanings to human life. The book states that we need new convincing "illusions" that enable us to feel heroic in ways that are agreeable. Becker, however, does not provide any definitive answer, mainly because he believes that there is no perfect solution. Instead, he hopes that gradual realization of humanity's innate motivations, namely death, can help to bring about a better world.

Becker argues that the conflict between contradictory immortality projects (particularly in religion) is a major source of the violence and misery in the world such as wars, genocide, racism, nationalism and so forth since immortality projects that contradict one another threaten one's core beliefs and sense of security.

== Some concepts and ideas ==
Throughout the book, Becker builds on the work of many writers and thinkers. Some of the more prominent of these include Søren Kierkegaard, Sigmund Freud, Norman O. Brown, and most notably, Otto Rank.

The concepts and ideas that Becker works with in The Denial of Death are wide-ranging. These ideas include, but are not limited to: mental illness, depression, schizophrenia, creativity, and neurosis.

=== Mental Illness ===
Becker concludes Part II of The Denial of Death with "A General View of Mental Illness" (Chapter 10). Here Becker offers a summary observation that "mental illness represents styles of bogging-down in the denial of creatureliness" that is part and parcel of immortality projects. Mental illness—especially depression—arises when this lack of connection to some meaningful project reminds us of our "creatureliness" and our mortality; and so represents a "malfunction of the symbolic animal".

=== Depression ===
At one extreme, people experiencing depression have the sense that their immortality project is failing. They either begin to think the immortality project is false or feel unable to successfully be a hero in terms of that immortality project. As a result, they are consistently reminded of their mortality, biological body, and feelings of worthlessness.

=== Schizophrenia ===
At the other extreme, Becker describes schizophrenia as a state in which a person becomes so obsessed with his or her personal immortality project as to altogether deny the nature of all other realities. Schizophrenics create their own internal, mental reality in which they define and control all purposes, truths, and meanings. This makes them pure heroes, living in a mental reality that is taken as superior to both physical and cultural realities.

=== Creativity ===
Like the schizophrenic, creative and artistic individuals deny both physical reality and culturally-endorsed immortality projects, expressing a need to create their own reality. The primary difference is that creative individuals have talents that allow them to create and express a reality that others may appreciate, rather than simply constructing an internal, mental reality.

=== Neurosis ===
In Chapter 9 of The Denial of Death, Becker discusses the concept of neurosis starting with Otto Rank's observation that "neurosis sums up all the problems of a human life." Becker elaborates on this, stating that "neurosis has three interdependent aspects":

- "…neurosis refers to people who are having trouble living with the truth of existence; it is universal in this sense because everybody has some trouble living with the truth of life and pays some vital ransom to that truth."
- "…neurosis is private because each person fashions his own peculiar stylistic reaction to life."
- "…neurosis is also historical to a large extent, because all the traditional ideologies that disguised and absorbed it have fallen away and modern ideologies are just too thin to contain it."

Before he discusses each of these three aspects, taking them up one at a time in Chapter 9, Becker reiterates that:

"When we say that neurosis represents the truth of life we again mean that life is an overwhelming problem for an animal free of instinct. The individual has to protect himself against the world, and he can do this only as any other animal would: by narrowing down the world, shutting off experience, developing an obliviousness both to the terrors of the world and to his own anxieties. Otherwise he would be crippled for action."

== Reception and legacy ==
Upon its publication in 1973, The Denial of Death was consistently reviewed and praised, and was awarded the 1974 Pulitzer Prize for General Nonfiction two months after Becker's death. It has not gone out of print, and a special 50th anniversary edition was issued in 2023 with a new foreword by Brian Greene. In 2015, cultural historian Morris Berman observed that "Becker's exploration of the dialectical tension between the individual and the community has never been surpassed." The Denial of Death continues to be praised for its post-Freudian approach to psychoanalysis, although it has also been criticized for its reductive depictions of mental health and humanity.

The book helped to inspire a revival of interest in the work of the Austrian psychoanalyst Otto Rank.

=== In popular culture ===
The book has also had a wide cultural impact beyond the fields of psychology and philosophy. The book made an appearance in Woody Allen's film Annie Hall, when the death-obsessed character Alvy Singer buys it for his girlfriend Annie. It was referred to by Spalding Gray in his work It's a Slippery Slope. Former United States President Bill Clinton quoted The Denial of Death in his 2004 autobiography My Life; he also included it as one of 21 titles in his list of favorite books. The playwright Ayad Akhtar mentions it in his Pulitzer Prize-winning play Disgraced. The Car Seat Headrest album Teens of Denial draws inspiration from the book and references it in the lyrics.

The book was an inspiration to Mark Manson while he was writing his bestseller The Subtle Art of Not Giving a F*ck (2016): "from the very first outline" (says Manson), "I knew the last chapters would be about death and that Becker would be a big part of it."

== See also ==
- Afterlife
  - Angel of Death
  - Psychopomps
- Angel of Grief
- Death anxiety
- Existentialism
- Flight from Death
- Impermanence in Buddhism
  - Reflections on repulsiveness
  - Three marks of existence
- Human condition
- Memento mori
- Near-death experience (NDE)
- Terror management theory
- The Hero with a Thousand Faces
- Unheimlich
  - Uncanny valley
