= Norman O. Brown =

American writer and philosopher

- Born: Norman Oliver Brown; September 25, 1913; El Oro, Mexico
- Died: October 2, 2002 (aged 89); Santa Cruz, California

Education
- Education: Balliol College, Oxford
- Academic advisor: Isaiah Berlin

Philosophical work
- Era: 20th-century philosophy
- Region: Western philosophy
- School: Marxism, psychoanalysis
- Institutions: UC Santa Cruz
- Notable ideas: Philosophy of polymorphous perversity

Norman Oliver Brown (September 25, 1913 – October 2, 2002) was an American scholar, writer, and social philosopher. Beginning as a classical scholar, his later work branched into wide-ranging, erudite, and intellectually sophisticated considerations of history, literature, psychoanalysis, culture, and other topics. Brown advanced some novel theses and in his time achieved some general notability.

== Life ==
Brown's father was an Anglo-Irish mining engineer. His mother was a Cuban of Alsatian and Cuban origin. He was educated at Clifton College, then Balliol College, Oxford (B.A., M.A., Greats; his tutor was Isaiah Berlin) and the University of Wisconsin–Madison (Ph.D., Classics).

In 1938, Brown married Elizabeth Potter. During the Second World War, he worked for the Office of Strategic Services as a specialist on French culture. His supervisor was Carl Schorske, and his colleagues included Herbert Marcuse and Franz Neumann. His other friends included the historians Christopher Hill and Hayden White as well as the philosopher Stuart Hampshire. At Wesleyan University, he befriended the composer John Cage, an association that proved fruitful to both. Brown became a professor of classics at Wesleyan. During Brown's tenure there, Schorske became a professor of history and the two engaged in a mutually beneficial interdisciplinary discourse.

In 1970, Brown was interviewed by Warren Bennis and Sam Keen for Psychology Today. Bennis asked him whether he lived out the vision of polymorphous perversity in his books. He replied,

I perceive a necessary gap between seeing and being. I would not be able to have said certain things if I had been under the obligation to unify the word and the deed. As it is I can let my words reach out and net impossible things - things that are impossible for me to do. And this is a way of paying the price for saying or seeing things. You will remember that I discovered these things as a late learner. Polymorphous perversity in the literal, physical sense is not the real issue. I don't like the suggestion that polymorphous perversity of the imagination is somehow second-best to literal polymorphous perversity.

== Work ==
Brown's commentary on Hesiod's Theogony and his first monograph, Hermes the Thief: The Evolution of a Myth, showed a Marxist tendency. Brown supported Henry A. Wallace's Progressive Party candidacy for president in 1948. Following Brown's disenchantment with politics in the wake of the 1948 presidential election, he studied the works of Sigmund Freud. This culminated in his classic 1959 work, Life Against Death. The book's fame grew when Norman Podhoretz recommended it to Lionel Trilling. In May 1960 Brown, who was then teaching at Wesleyan University, delivered a Phi Beta Kappa Address to Columbia University.

Love's Body, published in 1966, examines "the role of erotic love in human history, describing a struggle between eroticism and civilization."

In the late 1960s, following a stay at the University of Rochester, Brown moved to the University of California, Santa Cruz, as professor of humanities, teaching in the History of Consciousness and Literature departments. He was a highly popular professor, known to friends and students alike as "Nobby". The range of courses he taught, while broadly focused around the themes of poetics, mythology, and psychoanalysis, included classes on Finnegans Wake, Islam, and, with Schorske, Goethe's Faust.

Apocalypse and/or Metamorphosis, published in 1991, is an anthology that includes many of Brown's later writings.

In The Challenge of Islam, a collection of lectures given in 1981 and published in 2009, Brown argues that Islam challenges us to make life a work of art. Drawing on Henry Corbin's The Creative Imagination in the Sufism of Ibn 'Arabi, he argues that "Muhammad is the bridge between Christ and Dante and Blake."

== Influence on Ernest Becker ==
The Denial of Death is a 1973 work of psychoanalysis and philosophy by Ernest Becker, in which the author builds on the works of Brown, Søren Kierkegaard, Sigmund Freud, and Otto Rank. It was awarded the Pulitzer Prize for General Nonfiction in 1974.

== See also ==
- Freudo-Marxism

== Books ==
- 1947. Hermes the Thief: The Evolution of a Myth. Madison: University of Wisconsin Press.
- 1953. Hesiod, Theogony. Translated and with an introduction by Norman O. Brown. Indianapolis : Bobbs-Merrill.
- 1959. Life Against Death: The Psychoanalytical Meaning of History. Middletown: Wesleyan University Press.
- 1966. Love's Body. New York: Random House.
- 1973. Closing Time. New York: Random House.
- 1991. Apocalypse and/or Metamorphosis. Berkeley: University of California Press.
- 2009. The Challenge of Islam: The Prophetic Tradition. Ed. by Jerome Neu. Santa Cruz, California: New Pacific Press.
