= 7 Splinters in Time =

- Directed by: Gabriel Judet-Weinshel
- Screenplay by: Gabriel Judet-Weinshel
- Produced by: Edoardo Ballerini; Nitsa Benchetrit; Christian H. Cooper; Gill Holland; Gabriel Judet-Weinshel
- Starring: Al Sapienza; Ashley Nicole Anderson; Austin Pendleton; Edoardo Ballerini; Emmanuelle Chriqui; Giuliana Carullo; Greg Bennick; Lynn Cohen; Sarah Sokolovic
- Production company: Red Giant Media
- Release date: March 3, 2018 (Cinequest)
- Running time: 85 minutes
- Country: United States
- Language: English

7 Splinters in Time is a 2018 American independent science fiction film produced by Red Giant Media, written and directed by Gabriel Judet-Weinshel and filmed by cinematographer George Nicholas. The film is described by reviewers as neo-noir, and had the working title Omphalos.

== Plot ==
A detective investigates a murder, only to find that the victim is himself. Soon, he discovers multiple versions of himself, not all of them friendly.

Darius Lefaux is a gumshoe detective. His career is in shambles, his romantic life is comically void, and his only real human connection a cantankerous old woman who lives next door. One day a murder comes in, and Darius is summoned to view the body. But there's something very strange about this one. The body is ... him. The body is identical to Darius's.

Memories begin to haunt Darius, fragments of events that don't make sense. As the plot thickens, more duplicates of Darius emerge. One version is trying to kill him. In a race against the clock, Darius sets out to find this other self before it finds him.

Meanwhile, John Luka—an old ally of Darius and an eccentric, out-of-work juggler—learns that his friend may be in trouble. We learn that Luka was involved in a time travel experiment run amok, left scarred and destitute by the ordeal. Re-invigorated by the chance to help his friend, he sets out in search of Fyodor Wax, the father of the experiment, hoping Fyodor will lead him to his "brother Darius" before it's too late.

As Darius chips away at the case of his multiple selves, he is reunited with Alise, a beautiful woman from his past. A long-buried, yet troubled, romance is reignited. More memories surface—from a life they once had together, a life interrupted by an accident on a desert road ten years ago. When Luka finds Darius, the two men learn more about their shrouded past and the scientific experiment that links their existence, and it's suddenly clear what has to be done.

Darius and Luka journey to a secret site called "Omphalos," where they hope to put a stop to the disastrous experiment that may be at the root of their troubles. But the road to "Omphalos" isn't quite as it seems. The journey outward becomes a journey inward.

== Cast ==
- Al Sapienza
- Ashley Nicole Anderson
- Austin Pendleton
- Edoardo Ballerini
- Emmanuelle Chriqui
- Giuliana Carullo
- Greg Bennick
- Lynn Cohen
- Sarah Sokolovic
- Sean Gaffney

== Concept ==
This film is writer-director Judet-Weinshel's debut full-length feature. Judet-Weinshel relates that he had two feature scripts in development in 2008 when an economic recession left the studios "risk-averse" and caused work on the scripts to stall. Eventually he and cinematographer George Nicholas started filming images that they used to raise investment capital to complete 7 Splinters in Time on a "micro-budget." The film attracted an outstanding cast, made a successful showing at the 2018 Cinequest San Jose Film Festival, and was picked up for distribution.

== Reception ==
The Austin Chronicle gave the film a positive review, emphasizing the artistic quality of the concept and film editing. Film critic Richard Whitaker said of the film, "7 Splinters in Time is free jazz, and Judet-Weinshel finds echoes and frequencies in the form and the content." Whitaker went on to quote writer-director Judet-Weinshel, "Film is a form of time travel," he said. "It's a form of bricolage. You're cutting up time."

Variety gave the film a negative review, with reviewer Nick Schrager describing it as "scattershot" and "edited to ribbons in a schizoid manner that likely only makes complete sense to its maker." The review continued with a pan for the cast and writer-director: "Judet-Weinshel’s blitzkrieg aesthetics muddy his tale, whose themes of fate, sacrifice and salvation get lost in the convulsive shuffle."

The Los Angeles Times also panned the film, with critic Kimber Myers calling it an "intellectual exercise" that failed to ground with any kind of emotion. "Despite an ambitious premise and style," the review stated, "the neo-noir sci-fi indie is a fractured narrative that can’t achieve what its lofty ideas intend."

== Awards ==
- New Vision Award from Cinequest San Jose Film Festival 2018
