= Ernest Becker =

American cultural anthropologist (1924–1974)

- Born: September 27, 1924; Springfield, Massachusetts, U.S.
- Died: March 6, 1974 (aged 49); Burnaby, British Columbia, Canada
- Education: Syracuse University (BS, PhD)
- Known for: Death-centric perspective on human psychology, eliciting the creation of Terror Management Theory
- Notable work: The Birth and Death of Meaning (1971); The Denial of Death (1973); Escape from Evil (1975)
- Spouse: Marie H Becker
- Awards: Pulitzer Prize (1974)
- Website: The Ernest Becker Foundation

Ernest Becker (September 27, 1924 – March 6, 1974) was an American cultural anthropologist and author of the 1973 Pulitzer Prize-winning book The Denial of Death.

== Biography ==
=== Early life ===
Ernest Becker was born in Springfield, Massachusetts, to Jewish immigrant parents. Serving in the infantry during World War II, he would help liberate a Nazi concentration camp. After he completed his military service, Becker attended Syracuse University in New York. Upon graduation he joined the U.S. Embassy in Paris as an administrative officer.

In his early 30s, he returned to Syracuse University to pursue graduate studies in cultural anthropology, and would complete his PhD in 1960. The first of his nine books, Zen: A Rational Critique (1961), was based on his doctoral dissertation.

=== Professional career ===
After graduating from Syracuse University in 1960, Becker began "the short 14-year period of his professional career" as a professor and writer. Initially, he taught anthropology in the Department of Psychiatry at the Upstate Medical College in Syracuse, New York, but was summarily fired, along with other non-tenured professors, for supporting tenured Professor Thomas Szasz in a dispute with the administration over academic freedom. After a year in Italy, Becker was hired back at Syracuse University, this time in the School of Education.

In 1965, Becker acquired a lecturer position at the University of California, Berkeley in the anthropology program. However, trouble again arose between Becker and the administration, leading to his departure from the university. At the time, thousands of students petitioned to keep Becker at the school and offered to pay his salary, but the petition did not succeed in retaining Becker. In 1967, he taught at San Francisco State's Department of Psychology until January 1969, when he resigned in protest against the administration's stringent policies against student demonstrations.

In 1969, Becker began a professorship at Simon Fraser University in Burnaby, British Columbia, where he spent the final years of his academic life. During this time, Becker worked on the second edition of The Birth and Death of Meaning, to which he made extensive revisions. Next he wrote his 1974 Pulitzer Prize-winning work The Denial of Death. Finally, he worked on drafts of Escape from Evil, but the latter was not completed at the time of his death.

Becker's insistence on interdisciplinary work, along with the fact that students flocked to his lectures, which were marked by a high level of theatricality, did not endear him to many of his colleagues. Referring to his insistence on the importance symbolism plays in the human animal, he wrote, "I have tried to correct... bias by showing how deep theatrical 'superficialities' really go."

=== Death ===
In November 1972, Becker was diagnosed with colon cancer. Sixteen months later, on 6 March 1974, he would die from the disease at age 49 in Burnaby, British Columbia. Shortly before his death, he participated in a series of interviews with Sam Keen for Psychology Today.

== Ideas and concepts ==
As related above, Becker did not attain tenure when he was fired from his first academic position at Upstate Medical College in Syracuse, NY. This was a result of a dispute the school had with "anti-psychiatrist" Thomas Szasz, with whom Becker sided. This may be the reason Szasz's views are sometimes imputed to Becker. However, Becker's support of Szasz was limited to the issue of academic freedom: that is, whether or not Szasz (who had tenure) had the right to teach his views to psychiatry students.

During the final decade of his life, Becker drew upon the ideas and concepts developed by many different writers and thinkers to formulate his own theories, including Søren Kierkegaard, Sigmund Freud, Wilhelm Reich, Norman O. Brown, Erich Fromm, Georg Wilhelm Friedrich Hegel, and especially Otto Rank.

=== The Birth and Death of Meaning ===
The Birth and Death of Meaning, published in 1962 and then extensively revised and republished in 1971, was "Becker's first attempt to explain the human condition." It takes its title from the concept of mankind progressing from simple-minded ape to a world of symbols and illusions, and then deconstructing those illusions through our own evolving intellect.

=== Revolution in Psychiatry ===
During this early period, Becker was formulating a "fully transactional" view of mental health that eventually formed the basis of his book, Revolution in Psychiatry (1964). Although Szasz is cited on a few key points in this book, Becker pursues a very distinct path.

=== The Denial of Death ===
In his 1973 book The Denial of Death, Becker came to believe that an individual's character is essentially formed around the process of denying one's own mortality, that this denial is a necessary component of functioning in the world, and that this character-armor masks and obscures genuine self-knowledge. Much of the evil in the world, he believed, was a consequence of this need to deny death.

=== Escape From Evil ===
Becker eventually came to the position that psychological inquiry can only bring us to a distinct threshold beyond which belief systems must be invoked to satisfy the human psyche. The reach of such a perspective consequently encompasses science and religion, and led to what Sam Keen suggested was Becker's greatest achievement: the writing of Escape from Evil, left unfinished at the time of Becker's death, but posthumously published in 1975.

== Influence and legacy ==
Two months after his death, Becker was awarded a Pulitzer Prize for his book, The Denial of Death (1973), posthumously gaining him wider recognition. Escape From Evil (1975) was intended as a significant extension of the line of reasoning begun in The Denial of Death, developing the social and cultural implications of the concepts explored in the earlier book. Although the manuscript's second half was left unfinished at the time of his death, it was completed from the manuscript that existed as well as from notes on the unfinished chapter.

Since his death Becker's work, particularly as expressed in his later books, The Denial of Death and Escape from Evil, has had a significant impact on social psychology and the psychology of religion. Terror management theory, an important research programme in social psychology that has spawned over 200 published studies has turned Becker's views on the cultural influence of death anxiety into a scientific theory that helps to explain such diverse human phenomena as self-esteem, prejudice, and religion.

After his death, the Ernest Becker Foundation was founded, focused on multidisciplinary inquiries into human behavior. The foundation would focus on reducing violence in human society, using Becker's basic ideas to support research and application at the interfaces of science, the humanities, social action, and religion.

Flight From Death (2003) is a documentary film directed by Patrick Shen, based on Becker's work, and partially funded by the Ernest Becker Foundation.

== Works ==
=== Books ===
- 1961. Zen: A Rational Critique. New York: W. W. Norton.
- 1962. The Birth and Death of Meaning: An Interdisciplinary Perspective in Psychiatry and Anthropology. New York: The Free Press of Glencoe.
- 1964. Revolution in Psychiatry: The New Understanding of Man. New York: Free Press.
- 1967. Beyond Alienation: A Philosophy of Education for the Crisis of Democracy. New York: George Braziller.
- 1968. The Structure of Evil: An Essay on the Unification of the Science of Man. New York: George Braziller.
- 1969. Angel in Armor: A Post-Freudian Perspective on the Nature of Man. New York: George Braziller.
  - This book is a collection of shorter essays, lectures, and reviews written between 1962 and 1968.
- 1971. The Lost Science of Man. New York: George Braziller.
- 1971. The Birth and Death of Meaning: An Interdisciplinary Perspective on the Problem of Man (2nd ed.). New York: Free Press.
- 1973. The Denial of Death. New York: Free Press.
- 1975. Escape from Evil. New York: Free Press.

=== Essays ===
- 1974. "The spectrum of loneliness." Humanitas 10:237–46.
- 1974. "Toward the merger of animal and human studies." Philosophy of the Social Sciences 4:235–54.
