= Demetri Porphyrios =

Greek architect and author

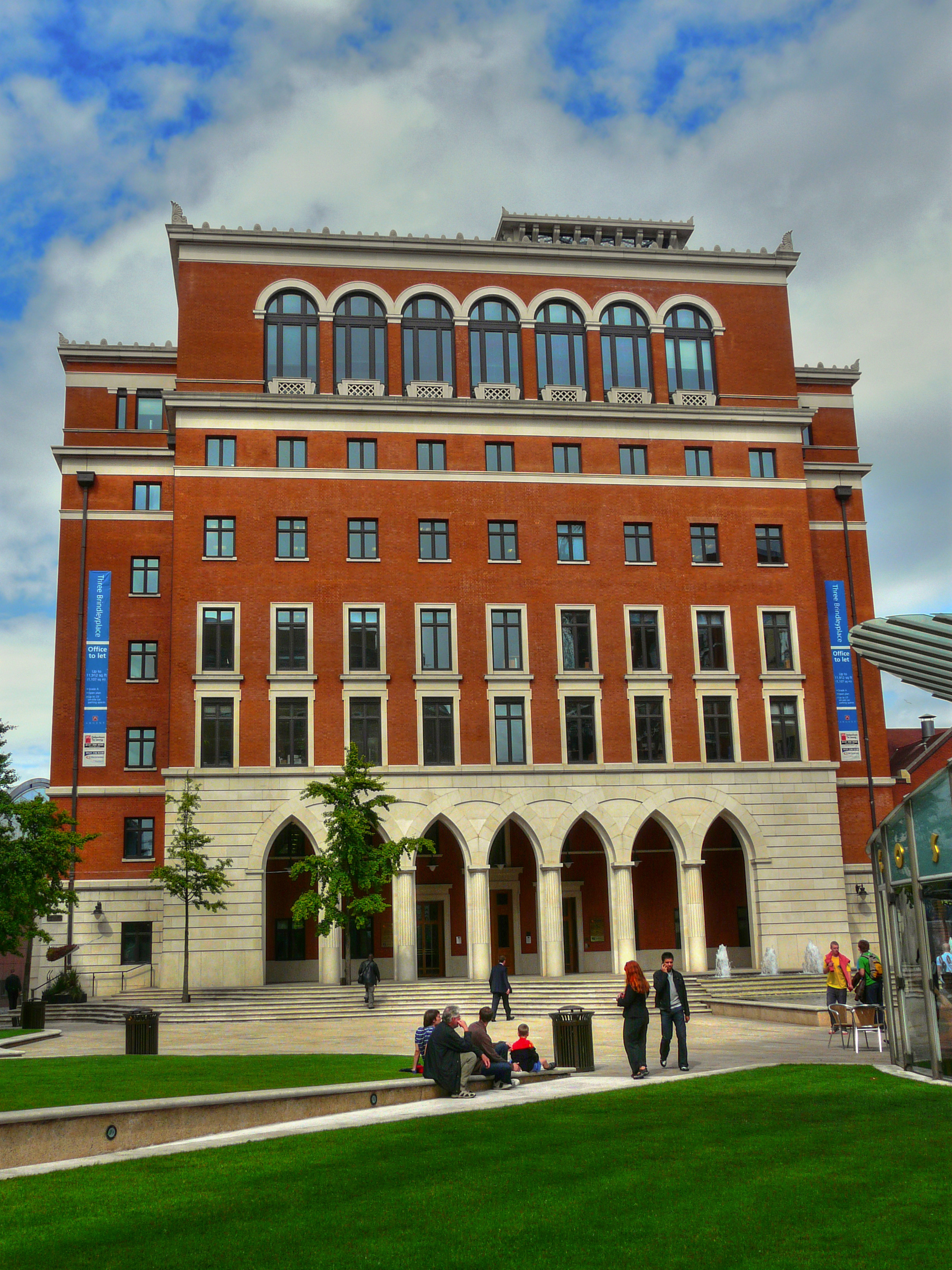
Three Brindleyplace in Brindleyplace, Birmingham, England (completed 1998)

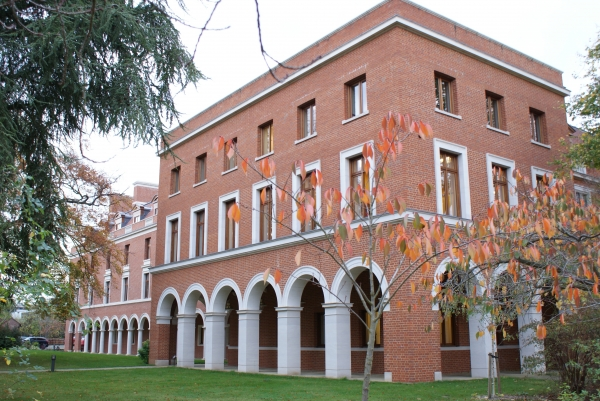
Ann's Court, Selwyn College, Cambridge (completed 2003)

Demetri Porphyrios (Greek: Δημήτρης Πορφύριος; born 1949) is a Greek architect and author who practices architecture in London as principal of the firm Porphyrios Associates. In addition to his architectural practice and writing, Porphyrios has held a number of teaching positions in the United States, the United Kingdom and Greece. He is currently a visiting professor at the Yale School of Architecture.

While Porphyrios is considered to be an exponent of New Classical architecture, he has designed buildings in both the Gothic and classical idioms. Moreover, he has designed occasional buildings in a more modernist style, notably the glass curtain-walled office block One Forbury Square (2003) in Reading, Berkshire, England.

== Education ==
Porphyrios studied at Princeton University where he earned a M.Arch. (Master of Architecture), and a Ph.D. in the history and theory of architecture. He wrote his Ph.D. thesis on the Finnish architect Alvar Aalto, in which he described the themes he believed had generated Aalto's work (typology, urbanism and nature), while arguing that Aalto's work was the end of the line for modernist architecture. Published later as Sources of Modern Eclecticism (London: Academy Editions, 1982), the book was presented as a structuralist analysis of Aalto's architecture; its author described as having been influenced by the philosophers Michel Foucault and Louis Althusser.

In his writing, Porphyrios has advocated a "classicism without style" (which he called "Doricism"), similar to the Nordic Classicism that prevailed in early 20th-century Scandinavia in the work of architects such as Kay Fisker in Denmark, Gunnar Asplund in Sweden, and in the early work of Alvar Aalto in Finland.

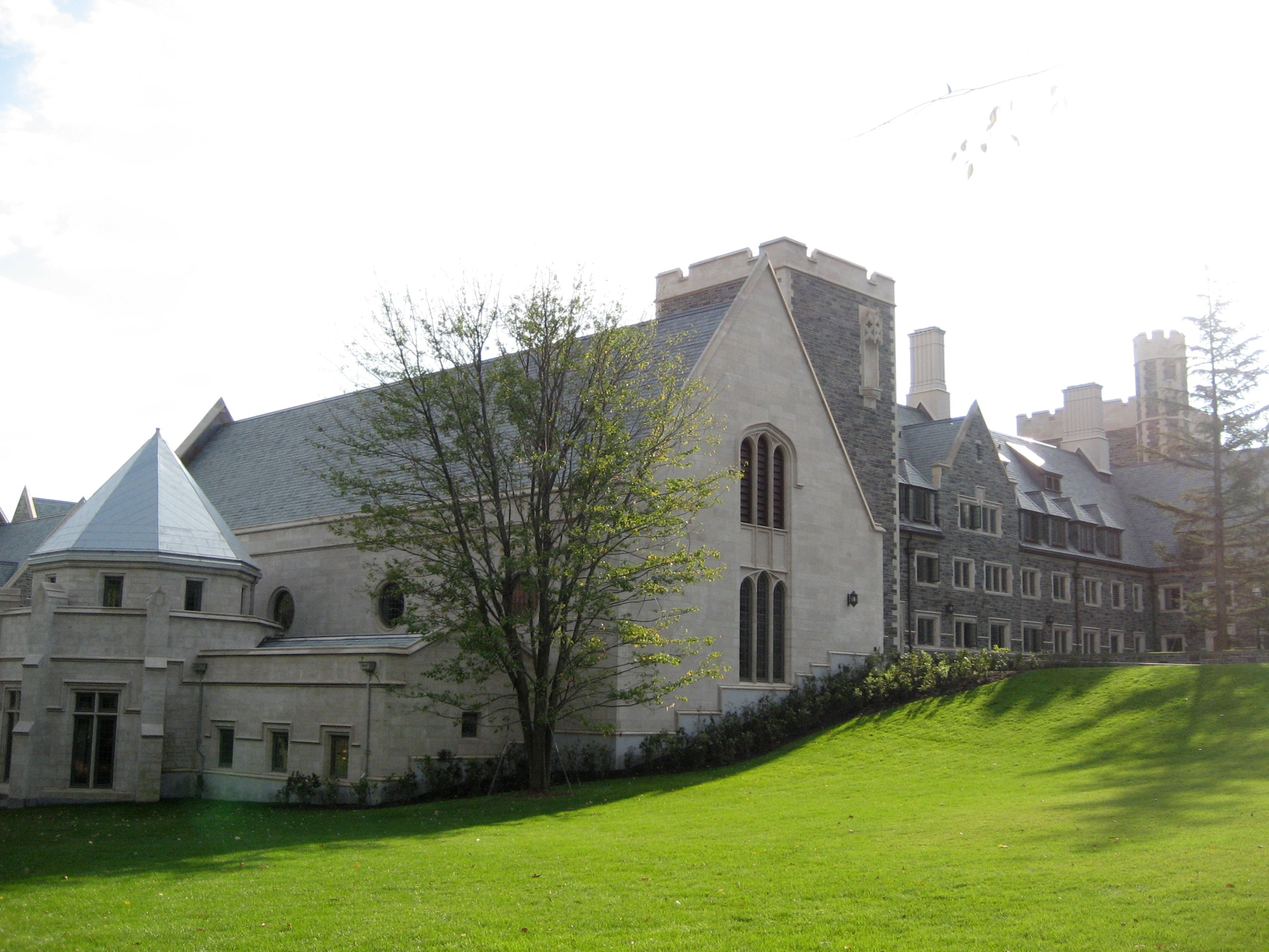
Whitman College, Princeton University, Princeton, US (completed 2007)

== Career ==
In the 1980s, Porphyrios regularly contributed to the journal Architectural Design, advocating the classical and vernacular as rational architectural languages. In 2002, Princeton University commissioned him to design a residential college (Whitman College) in the Collegiate Gothic style, which was completed in 2007. Following Princeton, Porphyrios began work on Selwyn College, Cambridge and Magdalen College, Oxford, adding his neoclassical style to the two ancient British universities.

== Notable buildings ==
- The Pavilion, Battery Park City, New York, US (1992)
- Pitiousa town, Spetses, Greece (1993)
- Three Brindleyplace Office Building, Birmingham, UK (1998)
- The Grove Buildings, Magdalen College, Oxford, UK (1999)
- Duncan Galleries, Nebraska, US (2002)
- Interamerican Headquarters Office Building, Athens, Greece (2002)
- Ann's Court, Selwyn College, Cambridge, UK (2003)
- One Forbury Square, Reading, Berkshire, UK (2003)
- Seven Brindley Place Office Building, Birmingham, UK (2004)
- Whitman College, Princeton University, US (2007)
- Bartlam Library, Selwyn College, Cambridge, UK (2020)

== Bibliography ==
=== Books by Demetri Porphyrios ===
- Demetri Porphyrios. Sources of Modern Eclecticism: studies on Alvar Aalto (London: Academy Editions; New York: St. Martin's Press, 1982).
- Demetri Porphyrios and A. Papadakes. Classicism is not a style (London and New York: St. Martin's Press, 1982).
- Demetri Porphyrios. Selected buildings and writings (London: Academy Editions, Architectural Monographs, No. 25, 1993).
- Demetri Porphyrios (editor). Building and rational architecture (London: Academy Editions, 1995).
- Demetri Porphyrios. Classical architecture (London: Andreas Papadakis Publishers, 1998).
- Demetri Porphyrios. Porphyrios Associates: the allure of the classical (New York: Rizzoli, 2016).
