= Trial (Seattle band) =

American hardcore punk band

Background information
- Origin: Seattle, Washington, U.S.
- Genres: Hardcore punk
- Years active: 1995–2000, reunions
- Label: Panic Records
- Members: Greg Bennick; Timm McIntosh; Alexei Rodriguez; Brian "Brain" Redman; E.J. Bastien; Roger Kilburn; Jason Shrout
- Past members: Josh "Sammi Curr" Freer; Michael Green; Derek Harn; Brian "Spicoli" Johnson

Trial was an American straight edge hardcore punk band based in Seattle, Washington, active from 1995 until 2000.

They reunited for three reunion shows in Seattle, London, and Budapest in the fall of 2005, and were part of the Burning Fight Book Release show in Chicago in May 2009. They headlined a night at Fluff Fest in the Czech Republic on Saturday, July 25, 2009, and then at Antifest in Stockholm Sweden a week later.

Shortly afterwards, bassist Brian Redman was killed in a moped accident. The band took two years off before returning to play Rainfest in Seattle, The Rumble in Chicago, East Coast Tsunami Fest in Pennsylvania, a surprise show in New York City, and Sound and Fury Fest in Santa Barbara, California. They went on tour throughout Europe for thirty shows in late 2011.

== Discography ==
Trial released three studio CDs. There were a number of alternative versions, vinyl-only releases and compilations as well.

- Through the Darkest Days (1996)
- Foundation (1997)
- Are These Our Lives (1999)
