= Flight from Death =

- Theatrical poster
- Written by: Greg Bennick; Patrick Shen
- Directed by: Patrick Shen
- Original language: English

Production
- Producers: Patrick Shen; Greg Bennick
- Running time: 89 min.

Original release
- Release: 2003

Flight from Death is a 2003 documentary film that investigates the relationship of human violence to fear of death, as related to subconscious influences. The film describes death anxiety as a possible root cause of many human behaviors on a psychological, spiritual, and cultural level. It was directed by Patrick Shen, produced by Greg Bennick, and narrated by Gabriel Byrne.

== Summary ==
The film's purpose is to investigate humankind's relationship with death, and is heavily influenced by the views of cultural anthropologist Ernest Becker's The Denial of Death. In addition to interviews with a number of contemporary philosophers, psychiatrists and teachers such as Sam Keen, Robert Jay Lifton, Irvin Yalom, Merlyn Mowrey and Daniel Liechty, the film introduces the viewer to a group of social psychologists, who conduct research in support of what they call terror management theory (terror in this case not being terrorism, but rather emotional and psychological reaction to mortality awareness). Over the last twenty-five years, proponents of terror management theory have conducted over 300 laboratory studies demonstrating that subtle reminders of death on a subconscious level motivates a statistically significant number of subjects to exhibit biased and xenophobic type behaviors, such as gravitating toward those who they perceive as culturally similar to themselves and holding higher negative feelings and judgments toward those they perceive as culturally dissimilar to themselves.

== Studies and research ==
Terror is the result of deep psychological forces; the research described in Flight from Death suggests that these forces can be explained, yielding information about personal anxiety and the motivation of social violence.

== Accolades ==
- Beverly Hills Film Festival - Audience Choice Award for Best Documentary (2003)
- Ohio Independent Film Festival - Best Documentary (2003)
- Silver Lake Film Festival - Best Documentary (2003)
- Malibu Film Festival - Best Documentary (2004)
- Northern Lights Documentary Film Festival - Best Documentary (2004)
- Northwest Film Forum - Winning Feature (2004)
- Rhode Island International Film Festival - Best Documentary (2004)

== See also ==
- Afterlife
  - Angel of Death
  - Psychopomps
- Angel of Grief
- Death anxiety
- Existentialism
- Impermanence in Buddhism
  - Reflections on repulsiveness
  - Three marks of existence
- Human condition
- Memento mori
- Near-death experience (NDE)
- Terror management theory
- The Denial of Death
- The Hero with a Thousand Faces
- Unheimlich
  - Uncanny valley
