= Christian H. Cooper =

American film producer

- Born: Christian Harley Cooper; July 14, 1976 (age 50); Rockwood, Tennessee, U.S.
- Education: King University
- Occupation: Trader

Christian Harley Cooper (born July 14, 1976) is a derivatives trader and author living in New York City. He is a frequent commentator in The Wall Street Journal, Reuters, Financial Times, and Bloomberg News. His writing has appeared in The Diplomat, The Hill, Foreign Affairs, and Nautilus Magazine.

Cooper is a member of the roundtables at the Washington-based think tank Center for Strategic and International Studies which is currently led by John Hamre.

Cooper directs Banking for a New Beginning, a public/private partnership between the Aspen Institute and the US Department of State. Banking for A New Beginning focuses on work with the central banks of Partners for a New Beginning (PNB) target countries including Turkey, Tunisia, Libya, Algeria, Pakistan, Morocco, Egypt and the Palestinian Territories, in an effort to share best practices, operational assistance, and coordinated action among the central banks.

== Cannabis Trading & Patent ==
Cooper has filed a patent on the state-based central pricing and trading of cannabis in the U.S. In a May 2021 West Virginia Gazette opinion piece, he argued the current U.S. political reality would prevent Federal legalization of cannabis and conservative states previously opposed to cannabis should legalize and regulate through a central market. He also argued the real value of the West Virginia market was 200 million dollars annually, not the $45 million often cited. In a 2022 Tennessee op-ed, he again argued for the deschedulization of cannabis in the US because the political reality will prohibit full, federal legalization. The state-based system he proposed follows similar regulatory models for alcohol still widely adopted across the South.

== Quantitative Publishing ==
In 2016, John Wiley & Sons announced a partnership with Cooper to create a program for candidates taking the Financial Risk Manager exam. The program is built on the existing Wiley Efficient Learning platform and Cooper's Financial Risk Manager product. The partnership was built on the view that the FRM designation would rapidly grow to be one of the premier financial designations for Chartered Financial Analysts. In 2018, Wiley released the full series of Cooper's work on quantitative finance published in six volumes.

== Banking for a New Beginning ==
Banking for a New Beginning is an initiative that aims to connect central banks in PNB target countries with similar financial institutions in the United States and Europe, in an effort to bridge communication and provide training and operational assistance where requested. The project will work specifically to facilitate information-sharing and best practices when it comes to supporting small and medium-sized enterprises, developing sustainable and secure energy, advancing entrepreneurship, and supporting local infrastructure development. By working closely with the central banking authorities, local businesses, and American and European counterparts, Banking for a New Beginning will facilitate coordinated banking practices as a means of cultivating globally business-friendly environments.

== Time in Iran ==
While living in Iran, Cooper was briefly detained and questioned by the IRGC. In October 2017, he published an essay titled "A Miscommunication and a Missing Peugeot" about the experience and outlined a way forward between the United States and Iran.

== Early life ==
Cooper grew up in Rockwood, Tennessee. His primary education was at a single room school at the local church. He credits luck and caring teachers for his subsequent escape from poverty. In January 2019, the app Pocket added Cooper’s essay “Why Poverty is Like a Disease”, based in part on Rockwood, to its must-read section reserved for the “most-saved, read, and shared stories on Pocket.” In 2022, Bedford, Freeman & Worth included the essay in the American high school textbook 'Ideas in Argument'.

== Bibliography ==
=== Essays ===
- Cooper, Christian H. (April 20, 2017). "Why Poverty Is Like a Disease". Nautilus. Archived from the original on November 18, 2019.
- Cooper, Christian H. (September 8, 2014). "How about a flat tax on repatriated income?". The Hill.
- Cooper, Christian H. (August 31, 2014). "In Iraq, A Faustian Bargain Awaits". Cicero Magazine.
- Cooper, Christian H. (August 12, 2013). "Saving Afghanistan's Economy: The 1818 Model". The Diplomat.
- Cooper, Christian H. (June 20, 2013). "Unreformed entitlements pose our greatest security threat". The Hill.
- Massoud, Ahmad Zia; Cooper, Christian H. (May 1, 2013). "A New Plan for a New Afghanistan". The Diplomat.

=== Films ===
- Christian Cooper (Executive Producer), Gabriel Judet-Weinshel (Filmmaker/Director) (2018). 7 Splinters in Time. Winner of the Cinequest Film Festival New Visions Award

=== 2019 Quantitative Finance Book Series ===
- Wiley FRM study guide 2019 : Part 1 Volume 1. John Wiley & Sons. January 28, 2019. p. 166. ISBN 9781119573685.
- Wiley FRM study guide 2019 : Part 1 Volume 2. John Wiley & Sons. January 28, 2019. p. 286. ISBN 9781119573685.
- Wiley FRM exam review practice questions 2019. John Wiley & Sons. April 10, 2018. p. 355. ISBN 9781119514213.
- Wiley Study Guide for 2019: Part 2 Volume 1. John Wiley & Sons. 2019. p. 224. ISBN 9781119573678.
- Wiley Study Guide for 2019: Part 2 Volume 2. John Wiley & Sons. 2019. p. 250. ISBN 9781119573678.
- Wiley Practice Questions for 2019 Part II FRM Exam. John Wiley & Sons. February 6, 2019. p. 447. ISBN 9781119573678.

== Affiliations ==
- Former Term Member, Council on Foreign Relations
- Member, CSIS Roundtable
- Member, Aspen Institute Society of Fellows
- Fellow, Truman National Security Project
- Member, Chatham House

== See also ==
- Truman National Security Project
- Council On Foreign Relations
- Ahmad Zia Massoud
