= The Silencers =

The Silencers may refer to:

- The Silencers (comics)
- The Silencers (novel), a 1962 Matt Helm spy novel by Donald Hamilton.
- The Silencers (film), the 1966 film based upon the novel and starring Dean Martin
- The Silencers (band), a Scottish pop/rock band
- The Silencers (ska band), an American ska punk band

== See also ==
- The Silencer, a 2000 action film
- Silencer (disambiguation)
