= La Source (2012 film) =

American documentary

- Directed by: Patrick Shen
- Written by: Patrick Shen; Brandon Vedder
- Produced by: Jordan Wagner; Patrick Shen; Brandon Vedder; Greg Bennick
- Starring: Josue Lajeunesse; Chrismedonne Lajeunesse
- Cinematography: Patrick Shen; Brandon Vedder
- Edited by: Patrick Shen; Brandon Vedder
- Music by: Mateo Messina
- Production companies: Transcendental Media; All Cut Up Films
- Release date: August 22, 2012 (Silverdocs)
- Running time: 71 minutes
- Countries: United States; Haiti
- Language: English

La Source is a 2012 documentary film directed by Patrick Shen. It follows efforts made by Josue Lajeunesse, a custodian at Princeton University, and his brother, Chrismedonne Lajeunesse, to supply their birth village of La Source, Haiti, with clean, running water. The film is narrated by Don Cheadle.

Josue Lajeunesse was a subject of the director's previous film, The Philosopher Kings.

== Premise ==
La Source follows Josue Lajeunesse, a native of La Source, Haiti, who works as a custodian at Princeton University and as a taxi driver while working to improve access to clean water in his hometown.

Josue fled La Source and Haiti during the 1990s amid instability and multiple coup attempts in the country (following the coups in June 1988, September 1988, and 1991), finding refuge in the United States. His brother, Chrismedonne, remained in the Haitian village. Their father had initially made attempts to bring clean water to their village, inspiring the brothers.

The documentary was filmed after the 2010 Haiti earthquake and during a cholera outbreak. Residents of La Source obtain water either from a river used for bathing and washing or from a mountain spring that requires a difficult journey on foot. Lajeunesse works with members of the community to develop a system for bringing cleaner water closer to the village. The film documents the challenges involved in the project and its effects on the community. Josue Lajeunesse sought aid from American relief workers and non-governmental organizations Generosity Water and Operation Blessing, and received help from Princeton in the form of a fundraising concert, to build a functioning water system.

== Reactions ==
Following La Source, additional humanitarian projects were created to benefit the village of La Source and its surrounding villages, including the building of a soccer field, two schools, and twenty additional villages receiving clean water. Lajeunesse has screened the film in efforts to raise money for additional projects, including the construction of a school in La Source.

La Source was a selection in the International Documentary Association's annual DocuWeeks showcase.
