= Awkward silence =

Conversational hiatus

An awkward silence or awkward pause is an uncomfortable pause in a conversation or presentation. The unpleasant nature of such silences is associated with feelings of anxiety as the participants feel pressure to speak but are unsure of what to say next. In conversation, average pause length varies by language, culture and context. An awkward silence may occur if a pause has exceeded, for instance, a length generally accepted for demarcating a subject change or the end of a turn. It may be preceded by an ill-considered remark or an imbalance in which one of the participants makes minimal responses. Alternatively, the tension may arise from an expectation that speech is expected in the setting, such as a classroom or presentation.

When Europeans communicate with Japanese people, a period of meaningful silence is sometimes misinterpreted as an awkward silence. Awkward silences may occur when Japanese people are confronted with a direct question as the loss of face when making an unwelcome admission tends to make them reluctant to say phrases like "I don't know".

== Remediation ==
Awkward silences may result from a faltering conversation in which the participants have completed what they wanted to say. To avoid such a conclusion, it has been recommended that the participants actively close the conversation by summarising what was said and thanking the others for their contributions.

When prolonged conversation is expected, people may be put at ease and conversation facilitated by contriving topics. In a social setting where people are meeting for the first time, the organiser of the gathering may propose an icebreaker or conversation opener such as a round of introductions. Conversation pieces, such as novel trinkets or artworks, may be used to stimulate continued conversation. In an online setting or virtual reality, an automated agent may be used to monitor and stimulate flagging conversation by suggesting topics.

== In art and literature ==
In the film Pulp Fiction, Mia and Vincent discuss uncomfortable silences after a pause in their conversation at Jackrabbit Slim's:

Mia: Don't you hate that?
Vincent: Hate what?
Mia: Uncomfortable silences. Why do we feel it's necessary to yak about bullshit in order to be comfortable?
Vincent: I don't know. That's a good question.
Mia: That's when you know you found somebody really special. When you can just shut the fuck up for a minute and comfortably share silence.

The Late Late Show with Craig Ferguson features a running gag of an awkward pause between Craig Ferguson and guests.

== See also ==
- Social skills
