= Patrick Shen =

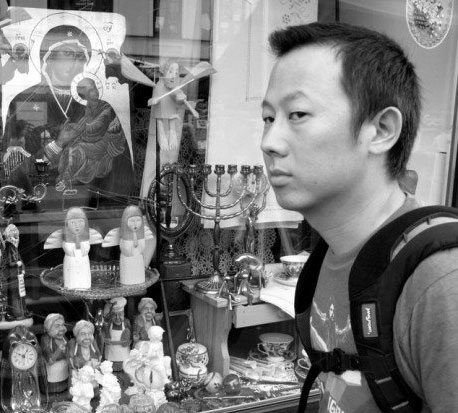
- Born: 1975 (age 50–51); United States
- Spouse(s): Karen Hsueh (m. 2006)
- Website: http://www.patrickshen.com

Patrick Shen (born 1975) is a Chinese writer, director, and producer. Shen is the founder of Transcendental Media.

== Documentaries ==
Shen directed the Emmy-nominated documentary We Served With Pride: The Chinese American Experience in WWII. This documentary explores the involvement of Chinese Americans during World War II and premiered in 1999 at the Smithsonian Institution in Washington, D.C. It was later broadcast on PBS. During its premiere, the cast and crew were invited to meet President Bill Clinton at the White House.

In 2001, Shen began production on his first feature-length documentary, Flight from Death. The film explores the influence of mortality awareness on human behavior, drawing inspiration from the works of cultural anthropologist Ernest Becker. Narrated by actor Gabriel Byrne, the documentary received seven Best Documentary awards at U.S. film festivals and was released in 2005 by Go Kart Films.

Shen's second feature-length documentary, The Philosopher Kings, examines the lives and wisdom of janitorial staff at universities such as Cornell, Princeton, and Duke. The film premiered at the AFI Silver Docs Film Festival in 2009, where it was nominated for Best Documentary. It received the Emerging Cinematic Vision Award from the Camden International Film Festival.

Shen's third documentary, La Source, premiered at the AFI Silver Docs Film Festival in June 2012. Narrated by actor Don Cheadle, it follows Josue Lajeunesse, a janitor at Princeton University, as he returns to Haiti after the 2010 earthquake to lead a project providing clean water to his village, La Source. The film was nominated for the Social Impact Award at Silver Docs and highlighted Lajeunesse's efforts to bring clean water to his community.

In 2015, Shen premiered his fourth film, In Pursuit of Silence, at CPH:DOX, a documentary film festival in Denmark. The film examines the value of silence in modern society and had its North American premiere at the South by Southwest Film Festival in 2016. It was subsequently released in over 250 theaters worldwide in 2016 and 2017.
