= Patty Kazmaier-Sandt =

American ice hockey player (1962–1990)

Patty Kazmaier-Sandt (January 8, 1962 – February 15, 1990) was a four-year varsity letter-winner for the Princeton University women's ice hockey team from 1981 through 1986. The Patty Kazmaier Award is named in her memory.

== Playing career ==
Kazmaier was a student-athlete at Middlesex School in Concord, Massachusetts. While she was there, she played ice hockey, was co-captain of the field hockey team and earned All-New England honors in lacrosse. Besides sports, Kazmaier was also co-editor and publisher of the school's literary magazine.

While at Princeton, she helped lead Princeton to the Ivy League Championship in three consecutive seasons (1981–82 through 1983–84). During her time at Princeton, she was a four-year varsity ice hockey letter-winner.

After taking a leave of absence from Princeton in 1984–85, Kazmaier was named to the All-Ivy League First Team and the All-Eastern College Athletic Conference First Team as a senior in 1985–86. In addition, she was the Ivy League Most Valuable Player. Kazmaier graduated from Princeton in 1986 with a bachelor's degree in religion.

== Personal life ==
While at Princeton, Patty was a member of the Two Dickinson Street Co-op, and an actress. Kazmaier died on February 15, 1990, at the age of 28 after a long struggle with thrombotic thrombocytopenic purpura, a rare blood disease. She was survived by her husband, Mark J. Sandt, and by her daughter, Serena. Her father, Dick Kazmaier, also a graduate of Princeton University, won the Heisman Trophy in 1951.

== Awards and honors ==
- All-Ivy League Honorable Mention honors as a freshman
- All-Ivy League Second Team in her sophomore and junior seasons
- All-Ivy League First Team and All-Eastern College Athletic Conference First Team as a senior
- Ivy League Most Valuable Player (1986)

== See also ==
- Patty Kazmaier Award
