= Silencer =

Silencer may refer to:

- Silencer (firearms), or suppressor, a muzzle device that suppresses acoustic intensity
- Muffler, or silencer in British English, a device to reduce the noise of an engine's exhaust
- Sound trap, or silencer, a device to reduce mechanical equipment noise

== Fictional characters ==
- Silencer (comics), the name of different characters in Marvel Comics
- Silencers, in the Crusader: No Remorse game
- Silencer, a nickname given to a character played by Omi Vaidya in the 2009 Indian film 3 Idiots
- Silencer, a supporting Arrow character
- The Silencer, in The New Age of DC Heroes

== Film and television ==
- The Silencers (novel), a 1962 Matt Helm novel by Donald Hamilton
- The Silencers (film), a 1966 Matt Helm film
- "Silencer", an episode of CSI: Miami (season 4)
- "Silencer", an episode of Law & Order: Criminal Intent (season 6)
- The Silencer, a 2000 action film

== Music ==
- Silencer (band), a Swedish black metal band
- Silencer (Blake Morgan album), 2006
- Silencer (Nels Cline Trio album), 1992
- Silencer (Zed album), 2000
- "Silencer", a song by Dub War from the 1996 album Wrong Side of Beautiful
- "Silencer", a song by The Haunted from the 2000 album Made Me Do It

== Other uses ==
- Silencer (genetics), a DNA sequence capable of binding transcription regulation factors
- Silencer (Judge Dredd novel), by David Bishop, 1994
- Silencer (poetry collection), by Marcus Wicker, 2017
- Silencer (video game), 1998

== See also ==
- The Silencers (disambiguation)
