= In Pursuit of Silence =

American documentary

- Directed by: Patrick Shen
- Produced by: Andrew Brumme; Patrick Shen; Brandon Vedder; Cassidy Hall
- Cinematography: Patrick Shen; Brandon Vedder
- Edited by: Patrick Shen
- Music by: Alex Lu
- Production company: Transcendental Media
- Distributed by: The Cinema Guild
- Release date: 2015
- Running time: 81 minutes
- Language: English

In Pursuit of Silence is a 2015 documentary film directed by Patrick Shen. It focuses on society's relationship with silence, sound, and the impact of noise on life.

The documentary was inspired by George Prochnik's 2011 book, In Pursuit of Silence. Additionally, Shen was inspired by the film Into Great Silence, and silent filmmaker Nathaniel Dorsky. The documentary was funded through two Kickstarter campaigns and filmed over two years in eight countries. Shen and co-producer Brandon Vedder received a grant from the Center for Asian American Media to consult with Dorsky on the direction of the film. In 2015, In Pursuit of Silence was screened at CPH:DOX, and in 2016, the film was screened at South by Southwest and Sheffield DocFest.

== Premise ==
In Pursuit of Silence, beginning with an ode to 4'33", a piece by American composer John Cage, examines a range of ambient soundscapes, including a tea ceremony in Kyoto and the urban environment of Mumbai. It features interviews with doctors, scientists, theologians, and other specialists discussing the effects of noise and silence. The documentary follows several individuals and locations, including Greg Hindy, who undertakes a silent journey from New Hampshire to California; a forest in Okutama, Japan, where therapeutic retreats are conducted; and a New York public school affected by noise from passing trains. The film also examines noise pollution, urban environments, technology, and the use of silence in religious, cultural, and scientific contexts, such as research into silence conducted at Orfield Laboratories. The documentary also features works from Pico Iyer.

== Reactions ==
Following the making of the documentary, Shen constructed a shed in his backyard, working from there rather than an office space in Los Angeles, to further embrace silence. Vedder and his family moved away from Los Angeles during the production of the film.

In Pursuit of Silence drew comparisons to the 1982 documentary film, Koyaanisqatsi.
