= The Philosopher Kings (film) =

2009 documentary film

- Directed by: Patrick Shen
- Produced by: Greg Bennick; Patrick Shen
- Cinematography: Patrick Pai; Patrick Shen
- Edited by: Patrick Shen
- Music by: Nathan Matthew David
- Production company: Transcendental Media
- Release date: March 1, 2009
- Running time: 69 minutes
- Country: United States
- Language: English

The Philosopher Kings is a 2009 documentary film directed by Patrick Shen, and produced by Greg Bennick, about custodial workers at major U.S. universities and their lives.

The film premiered at Silverdocs in June 2009 and was shown at the SF DocFest film festival at The Roxie in San Francisco in October 2009.

== Premise ==
The Philosopher Kings follows multiple custodians at American universities, such as Cornish College of the Arts; UC Berkeley; Duke University; University of Florida, including the Florida Museum of Natural History; Princeton University, for the section about Josue Lajeunesse; the California Institute of Technology; and Cornell University. The documentary explores their personal experiences, perspectives on education and knowledge, and lives outside work, addressing perceptions of custodial labor and the social invisibility of those workers in institutional settings.

== See also ==
- La Source (2012 film)
