= La Source, Haiti =

La Source
- Communal section
- Location in Haiti
- Coordinates: 18°26′0″N 73°55′0″W
- Country: Haiti
- Department: Grand'Anse
- Arrondissement: Corail
- Elevation: 416 m (1,365 ft)

La Source (French pronunciation: [la suʁs]) is a communal section in the Corail Arrondissement, in the Grand'Anse department of Haiti.

The village was mentioned in the documentary film called The Philosopher Kings. One former resident who has emigrated to the United States, Josue Lajeunesse, has been active in bringing a clean water source closer to the village, whose residents had previously needed to travel to a nearby mountain for water, a twenty-mile round trip. Currently, he is trying to provide a permanent and reliable water system utilizing cisterns for each house so the water is even more accessible. After the water system is implemented in 2010, he would also like to provide the village with electricity, in the form of solar panels, and computers.

La Source sustained heavy damage in the 2010 Haiti earthquake, and around half the structures in the town were damaged or destroyed. Following the earthquake, another documentary was released, following up on the water supply, titled La Source.
