= Sam Keen =

American philosopher (1931–2025)

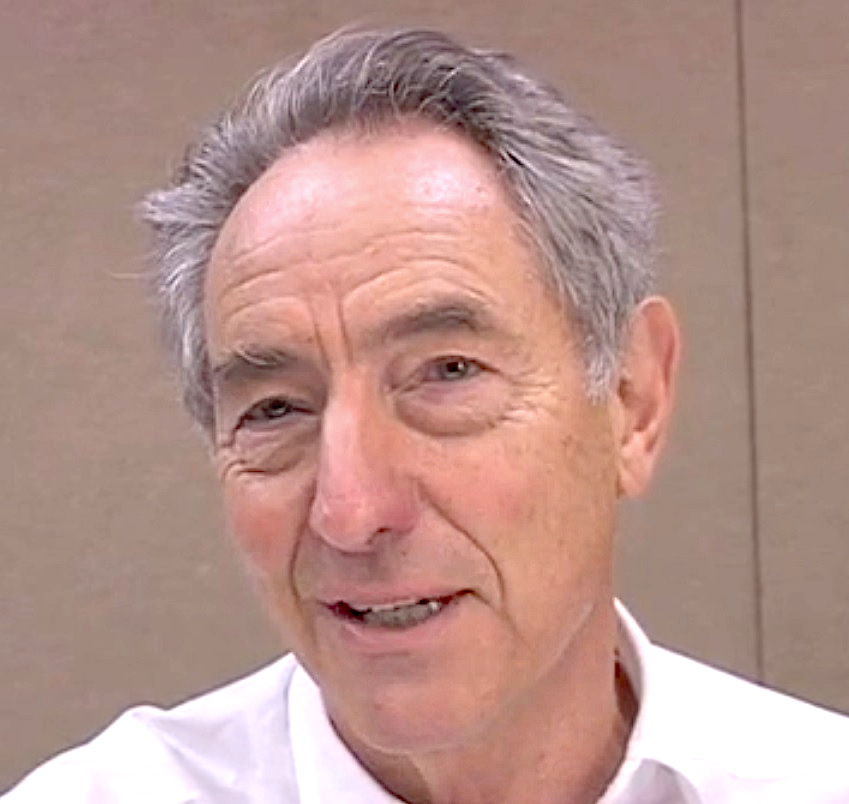
- Keen in 2004
- Born: Samuel McMurray Keen; November 23, 1931; Scranton, Pennsylvania, U.S.
- Died: March 19, 2025 (aged 93); Oahu, Hawaii, U.S.
- Education: Ursinus College; Harvard Divinity School (ThD); Princeton University (PhD)
- Occupations: Author; journalist; theologian
- Spouses: Heather Barnes (divorced); Janine Lovett (divorced); Patricia de Jong (m. 2004)

Samuel McMurray Keen (November 23, 1931 – March 19, 2025) was an American author, academic and philosopher who is best known for his exploration of questions regarding love, life, wonder, religion, and being a male in contemporary society.

== Background ==
Samuel McMurray Keen was born in Scranton, Pennsylvania on November 23, 1931, and grew up in Maryville, Tennessee, and Wilmington, Delaware. He earned a bachelor's degree from Ursinus College, a doctorate in theology from Harvard Divinity School, and a PhD in religious philosophy from Princeton University. He taught briefly at Louisville Presbyterian Theological Seminary before moving to California in 1968.

== Career ==
Keen worked as a freelance journalist for some time, and authored several books about spirituality and religion. He co-produced Faces of the Enemy, an award-winning PBS documentary; was the subject of a Bill Moyers' television special in the early 1990s; and for 20 years served as a contributing editor at Psychology Today magazine. He was also featured in the 2003 documentary Flight from Death.

Keen gained notice for his various self-help books and workshops. In 1991, his book Fire in the Belly: On Being a Man was published, and was part of a movement which encouraged men to "follow their warrior spirit", as The New York Times described it. Keen believed that contemporary society and harmed and constrained men and women, and said that a productive movement could provide the same liberation for men as feminist movements could for women. Later, Keen became interested in the flying trapeze, and said it could provide psychological benefits in his 1999 book Learning to Fly: Trapeze – Reflections on the Fear, Trust, and the Joy of Letting Go.

== Personal life and death ==
Keen's marriages to Heather Barnes and Janine Lovett ended in divorce; he had two children from his first marriage and one from his second. In 2004, he married Patricia de Jong, who was a former senior minister of First Congregational Church of Berkeley, United Church of Christ, in Berkeley, California. They lived on a ranch in Sonoma, California.

Keen died on March 19, 2025, at the age of 93, while vacationing in Oahu, Hawaii.

== Books ==
=== In print ===
- Prodigal Father, Wayward Son (2015)
- In the Absence of God: Dwelling in the Presence of the Sacred (2010)
- Sightings: Extraordinary Encounters with Ordinary Birds (Chronicle Books, 2007)
- Learning to Fly: Reflections on Fear, Trust, and the Joy of Letting Go (1999)
- To Love and Be Loved (Bantam, 1997)
- Hymns to an Unknown God (Bantam, 1994)
- Inward Bound: Exploring the Geography of Your Emotions (Bantam, 1992)
- Fire in the Belly: On Being a Man (Bantam, 1991)
- Your Mythic Journey (Tarcher, 1990)
- Faces of the Enemy. Reflections of the Hostile Imagination. (Harper and Row, San Francisco 1986)

=== Out of print ===
- The Passionate Life (Harper and Row)
- Beginnings Without End (Harper and Row, 1975)
- To a Dancing God (Harper and Row, 1970)
- Apology for Wonder (Harper and Row, 1969)
- Gabriel Marcel (John Knox Press, 1967)

== See also ==
- American philosophy
- List of American philosophers
- Mythopoeic thought
