= Otto Rank =

Austrian psychoanalyst (1884–1939)

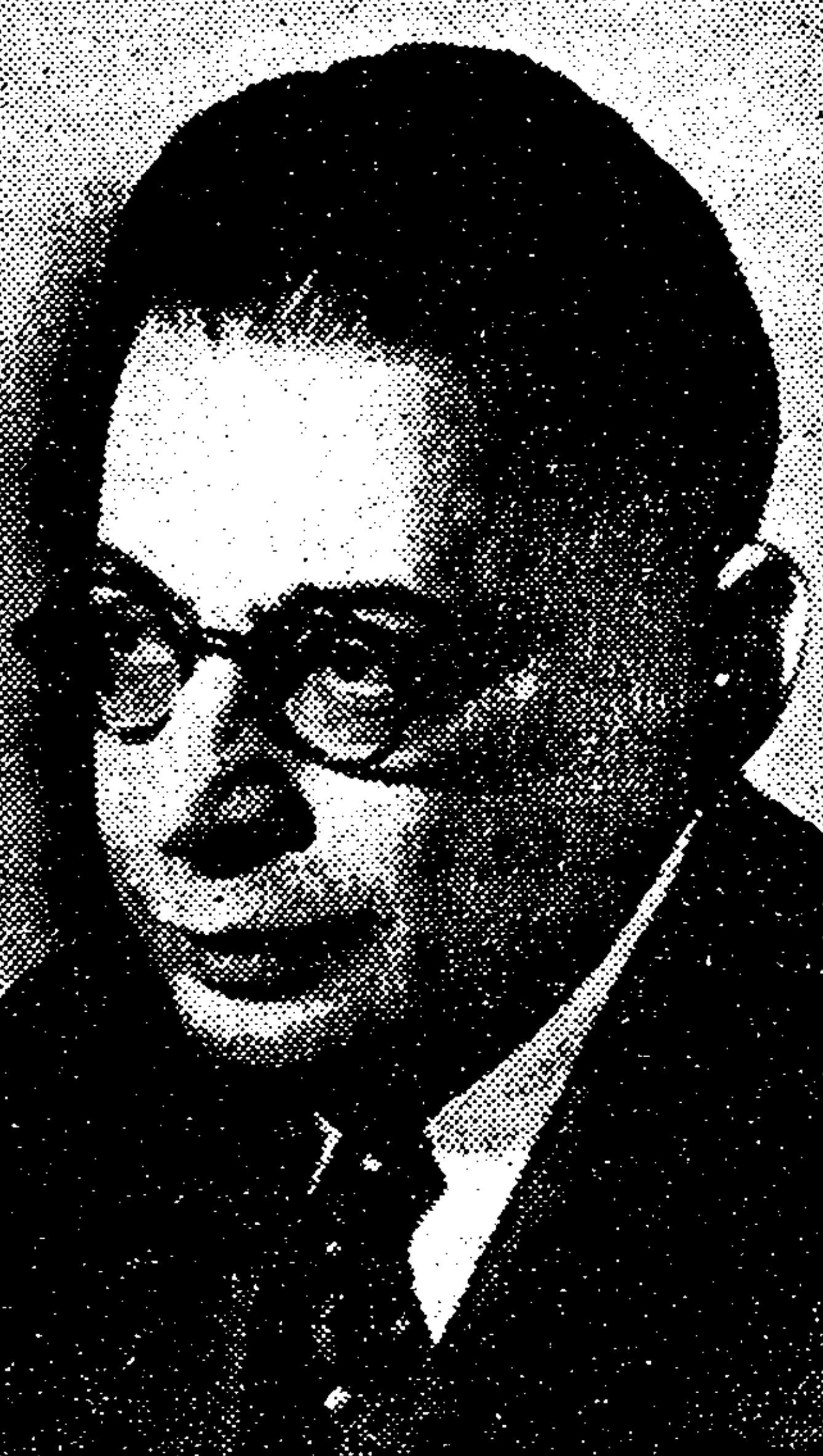
- Born: Otto Rosenfeld; 22 April 1884; Vienna, Austria-Hungary
- Died: 31 October 1939 (aged 55); New York City, US
- Known for: Psychoanalytic look at heroes and their births The Double; The pre-Oedipal stage Existential therapy
- Spouse: Beata (Tola) Rank

Academic background
- Education: University of Vienna
- Influences: Sigmund Freud, Friedrich Nietzsche, Søren Kierkegaard

Academic work
- Discipline: Psychoanalysis, philosophy
- Institutions: University of Pennsylvania
- Influenced: Sigmund Freud, Carl Jung, Sándor Ferenczi, Jessie Taft, Carl Rogers, Paul Goodman, Rollo May, Irvin Yalom, R. D. Laing, Ernest Becker, Stanislav Grof, Matthew Fox, Anaïs Nin, Henry Miller, Lawrence Durrell, Nella Larsen, Salvador Dalí, Martha Graham, Samuel Beckett

Otto Rank (/rɑːŋk/; Austrian German: [raŋk]; né Rosenfeld; 22 April 1884 – 31 October 1939) was an Austrian psychoanalyst, writer, and philosopher. Born in Vienna, he became one of Sigmund Freud's closest collaborators, served as secretary of the Vienna Psychoanalytic Society, and edited leading psychoanalytic journals while publishing studies of myth and creativity. His book The Trauma of Birth (1924) proposed that the anxiety of separation at birth precedes the Oedipus complex, coined the term "pre-Oedipal," and triggered a decisive break with Freud's father-centered developmental theory. Rank established psychotherapy practices in Paris and New York, where he promoted a relationship-based way of being that called for the therapist to show authenticity, empathy and unconditional respect for the client. He influenced existential, interpersonal and humanistic therapy, social work, and action learning, and his ideas on creativity and the double continue to inform psychological and cultural criticism to the present.

== Early life and Freud's circle ==
Rank was born Otto Rosenfeld in 1884 to an Austrian-Jewish artisan family in Vienna. He impressed Freud in 1905 with a study of the artist (published in 1907), which led to Rank's appointment as secretary of the Vienna Psychoanalytic Society and the movement's first salaried post. Encouraged by Freud, Rank earned a doctorate in literature from the University of Vienna in 1912, and published his thesis (on the Lohengrin saga) as the first Freudian dissertation issued as a book. He joined Freud's "Secret Committee" to defend psychoanalysis, served as managing director of the movement's publishing house, and helped edit Internationale Zeitschrift für Psychoanalyse and Imago. A prolific writer and polymath, Rank extended psychoanalytic interpretation to legend, myth, and art, culminating in works such as The Myth of the Birth of the Hero and The Double.

== Career ==
=== The Trauma of Birth and break with Freud ===
Rank published Das Trauma der Geburt in 1924, arguing that the emotional trauma of separation at birth is stored preverbally as a bodily memory and unconsciously shapes art, myth, religion, and philosophy. This primal trauma, argued Rank, is re-experienced during the separation phase of therapy. Shocking Freud, Rank's book proposed a pre-Oedipal stage, at the core of which was the powerful mother, challenging Freud's view that the Oedipus complex, at the core of which was the powerful father, is the nucleus of neurosis, religion and culture.

Freud maintained that emotion is an expression of libido and likened analytic work to "the draining of the Zuyder Zee," whereas Rank asserted that Freud had confused sexuality and emotions.

In Das Trauma der Geburt Rank was the first to see the powerful mother as the primal source of the super-ego, a role that Freud had reserved for the powerful father. In a 1930 self-analysis of his writings, Rank observed that the "pre-Oedipal super-ego" had been emphasized by Melanie Klein without crediting his priority.

=== Therapeutic innovations ===
Between 1920 and 1924 Rank collaborated with Sándor Ferenczi on approaches that favored immediacy and emotional reciprocity in the "here-and-now" of the consulting room. They warned that Freud's technical recommendations produced "an unnatural elimination of all human factors in the analysis" and called for therapy grounded in lived experience. Analysts such as Sandor Rado later recalled how classical analysis ignored patients' emotional lives focusing, instead, on interpreting oral, anal, and phallic elements of the sexual drive, a tendency Rank viewed as harmful to liberating the creative will of his patients. Freud described libido as the engine of emotion and likened the analytic task to draining feelings from the patient, reinforcing distance over an authentic person-to-person relationship.

Rank countered that emotions are relational and that therapy should cultivate the creative will rather than uproot feeling. Commentators such as Fred Weinstein and Ernest Becker argued that psychoanalysis, up to the present, has never resolved Freud's confusion of sexuality with emotion, and Ferenczi's diary, written in 1932, recorded similar misgivings.

=== Later life and influence ===
Rank left Vienna in 1926 and divided his time between Paris and the United States, where he lectured, practiced psychotherapy, and continued to write on art, myth, and the will. At age 83, Freud died of physician-assisted suicide in London in September 1939. At age 55, Rank took ill suddenly and died in New York City in October 1939, reportedly remarking "Komisch" (strange, amusing) on his deathbed.

Rank's relationship-based will therapy transformed the therapeutic philosophy of Jessie Taft and Virginia Robinson, who introduced Rank's thought in the late 1920s at the Pennsylvania School of Social Work, creating the first strengths-based model of social work.

Having learned of relationship-based will therapy from a graduate of the Penn School, Carl Rogers invited Rank to deliver a weekend workshop in 1936 at the Child Guidance Clinic in Rochester, New York. "I became infected with Rankian ideas," Rogers later said, and credited Rank's American lectures with shaping client-centered therapy.

Co-creator with Rogers and Abraham Maslow of humanistic therapy, Rollo May described Rank as "the great unacknowledged genius in Freud's circle" in the foreword to Rank's American lectures.

Rank's focus on the encounter also influenced Gestalt therapy, as Paul Goodman praised his post-Freudian ideas on art and creativity, and practitioners such as Erving Polster and Robert Landy adapted his emphasis on the here-and-now.

== Summary of core ideas ==
=== Therapeutic philosophy ===
Rank interpreted psychotherapy as a collaborative process of learning and unlearning that keeps emotional experience at the center. He argued that the therapeutic relationship lets people discover more creative ways to think, feel, and act in the present while releasing patterns that have turned destructive, treating neurosis as a failure of creativity rather than a retreat from sexuality.

Rank reframed resistance to the analyst as a creative act. He defined counterwill, his term for resistance, as a positive force that protects integrity, supports individuation, and helps clients discover the capacity for willing.

=== Creativity and growth ===
For Rank, creative figures such as Rembrandt, Michelangelo, and Leonardo da Vinci model the courage to move beyond prior achievements. He praised their willingness to reach "beyond the ideology which they have themselves fostered," treating self renewal as the measure of greatness.

He likened unlearning to the labor of birth, insisting that lasting creativity depends on the ability to separate from internalized institutions, beliefs, and fears. In a 1938 lecture, he described life as "a succession of separations" that begins with birth and continues through each stage of adaptation, warning that people who cannot release worn out identities become trapped in earlier phases of growth.

== Legacy ==
Rank's emphasis on will, relationship, and creativity continues to inform modern psychotherapy, organizational practice, and cultural criticism.

Rank created modern object-relations theory in his 1926 lecture "The Genesis of the Object Relation," which framed development as a lifelong negotiation between individuation and connection. His analysis of creativity in Art and Artist linked artistic renewal to the ability to "step out of the frame" of settled ideology, a theme that informs Robert Kramer's work on transformative action learning and leadership development.

Ernest Becker drew on Rank's dialectic of "life fear" and "death fear," which later inspired terror management theory experiments by Sheldon Solomon, Jeff Greenberg, and Tom Pyszczynski. Rank's legacy also reaches into spiritual and transpersonal movements through thinkers such as Matthew Fox and Stanislav Grof, philosophers including Maxine Sheets-Johnstone, and contemporary cultural critics like Naomi Klein, who revisit his ideas about creativity, mortality, and the double.

Several theorists consider Rank the first relational psychoanalyst and acknowledge his influence on the emergence of interpersonal psychoanalysis. There are links between contemporary relational psychoanalysis and Rank’s theory of birth trauma, as Rank’s ideas foreshadowed developments in the direction of Wilfred Bion’s and Donald Winnicott’s conceptions, as well as later elaborations of field theory and thirdness.

Rank's exploration of creativity continues to shape action learning, an inquiry driven method for problem solving, leadership development, and organizational learning. Drawing on Art and Artist, action learning coaches help teams create a safe container, pose challenging questions, and "step out of the frame of the prevailing ideology" so members can examine assumptions and reframe their choices. The process mirrors Rank's view of artistic growth as an ongoing effort to bring new perspectives into being. In organizational settings, action learning uses these insights to help individuals and teams question deeply held identities, experiment with alternative frames, and practice the skill of unlearning together.

== Major publications ==
By date of first publication

| Year | German title (current edition) | English translation (current edition) |
|---|---|---|
| 1907 | Der Künstler | The Artist |
| 1909 | Der Mythus von der Geburt des Helden (Turia & Kant, 2000, ISBN 3-85132-141-3) | The Myth of the Birth of the Hero (Johns Hopkins, 2004, ISBN 0-8018-7883-7) |
| 1911 | Die Lohengrin Sage [doctoral thesis] | The Lohengrin Saga |
| 1912 | Das Inzest-Motiv in Dichtung und Sage | The Incest Theme in Literature and Legend (Johns Hopkins, 1991, ISBN 0-8018-4176-3) |
| 1913 | Die Bedeutung der Psychoanalyse fur die Geisteswissenschaften [with Hanns Sachs] | The Significance of Psychoanalysis for the Human Sciences |
| 1914 | "Traum und Dichtung" and "Traum und Mythus" in Sigmund Freud's Die Traumdeutung | The Interpretation of Dreams eds. 4–7: "Dreams and Poetry"; "Dreams and Myth" added to Ch. VI, "The Dream-Work." In Dreaming by the Book L. Marinelli and A. Mayer, Other, 2003. ISBN 1-59051-009-7 |
| 1924 | Das Trauma der Geburt (Psychosozial-Verlag, 1998, ISBN 3-932133-25-0) | The Trauma of Birth, 1929 (Dover, 1994, ISBN 0-486-27974-X) |
| 1924 | Entwicklungsziele der Psychoanalyse [with Sándor Ferenczi] | The Development of Psychoanalysis / Developmental Goals of Psychoanalysis |
| 1925 | Der Doppelgänger [written 1914] | The Double (Karnac, 1989, ISBN 0-946439-58-3) |
| 1927 | Grundzüge einer genetischen Psychologie auf Grund der Psychoanalyse der Ichstruktur, 1. Teil (Leipzig und Wien: Franz Deuticke, 1927) | |
| 1928 | Grundzüge einer genetischen Psychologie auf Grund der Psychoanalyse der Ichstruktur, 2. Teil: Gestaltung und Ausdruck der Persönlichkeit (Leipzig und Wien: Franz Deuticke, 1928) | |
| 1929 | Wahrheit und Wirklichkeit | Truth and Reality (Norton, 1978, ISBN 0-393-00899-1) |
| 1930 | (Consists of Volumes II and III of "Technik der Psychoanalyse": Vol. II, "Die Analytische Reaktion in ihren konstruktiven Elementen"; Vol. III, "Die Analyse des Analytikers und seiner Rolle in der Gesamtsituaton". Copyright 1929, 1931 by Franz Deuticke.) | Will Therapy, 1929–31 (First published in English in 1936;reprinted in paperback by Norton, 1978, ISBN 0-393-00898-3) |
| 1930 | Seelenglaube und Psychologie | Psychology and the Soul (Johns Hopkins, 2003, ISBN 0-8018-7237-5) |
| 1932 | Kunst und Künstler (Psychosozial-Verlag, 2000, ISBN 3-89806-023-3) | Art and Artist (Norton, 1989, ISBN 0-393-30574-0) |
| 1933 | Erziehung und Weltanschauung : Eine Kritik d. psychol. Erziehungs-Ideologie, München: Reinhardt, 1933 | Modern Education |
| 1941 | | Beyond Psychology (Dover, 1966, ISBN 0-486-20485-5) |
| 1996 | | A Psychology of Difference: The American Lectures [talks given 1924–1938; edited and with an introductory essay by Robert Kramer (Princeton, 1996, ISBN 0-691-04470-8) |
