= Anxiety buffer disruption theory =

Application of terror management theory

Anxiety buffer disruption theory (ABDT) is an application of terror management theory to explain an individual's reaction to a traumatic event, which leads to post traumatic stress disorder. Terror management theory posits that humans, unlike any other organism, are uniquely aware that death is the inevitable outcome of life. When thoughts of death are made salient, such as when a terrorist attack carries those thoughts into the level of consciousness, humans are subject to debilitating anxiety unless it can be "buffered." Humans respond to the anxiety and dread mortality salience produces by clinging to their cultural worldview, through self-esteem and also close personal relationships. Cultural worldviews, with their cultural norms, religious beliefs and moral values infuse life with meaning. They give life a feeling of normalcy and also a feeling of control. There is no way to definitely prove one's cultural worldview, there they are fragile human constructs and must be maintained. Clinging to a cultural worldview and self-esteem buffer the anxiety connected to thoughts of mortality. When thoughts of death are salient, humans are drawn to their cultural world view which "stipulates appropriate social requirements, and standards for valued conduct, while instilling one's life with meaning, order and permanence."

When a traumatic experience cannot be assimilated into a currently held cultural worldview, the anxiety-buffering mechanisms are disrupted. ABDT argues that individuals face overwhelming anxiety which leads to the symptoms of PTSD including re-experiencing, hyper-arousal, avoidance and disassociation. The dissociation causes atypical responses to mortality salience compared with individuals who do not have an anxiety buffer disruption. When the anxiety buffer disruption is mild, exaggerated coping responses, such as rejecting or taking offense at other cultures, is expected. When the anxiety buffer disruption is severe, there can be a total breakdown of coping mechanisms. The theory was proposed by Tom Pyszczynski and Pelin Kesebir.

== Origins ==
=== Shattered assumption theory ===
In 1992, Janoff-Bulman delineated a theory of trauma response (Shattered Assumptions Theory). Janoff-Bulman posits that humans have basic assumptions about the world in which they live, based on the belief that the world is a benevolent and meaningful place and that the individual has self-worth. These assumptions give the individual the illusion that they have a measure of control on their own lives as well as a feeling of invulnerability. When an individual faces a traumatic event, their deeply held beliefs that the world is a benevolent and meaningful place and that they have a worthy role in that world are shattered.

=== Anxiety buffer disruption theory ===
Anxiety buffer disruption theory not only focuses on the thoughts and emotions of an individual, but it also studies the behavior that results when terror management theory and shattered assumptions theory are examined together. Excessive anxiety experienced by people with post-traumatic stress disorder occurs because the events causing the post-traumatic stress disorder have demonstrated to these individuals that anxiety-buffering mechanisms are not capable of protecting them from death. Individuals who have high levels of peritraumatic dissociation and low levels of self-efficacy coping, two indicators of post-traumatic stress disorder, have abnormal responses to reminders of death. These individuals in turn do not utilize the coping mechanisms that are typically used to remove the fear of death: culture, self-esteem, and interpersonal relationships. In fact, in individuals with post traumatic stress disorder, mortality salience coping mechanisms are viewed as worthless and perhaps are even seen to be detestable.

=== Components of anxiety buffers ===
- Cultural Worldview: Individuals who have post traumatic stress disorder will often reject their culture when provided with mortality salience triggers, the direct opposite of what terror management theory demonstrates to be true in those without post traumatic stress disorder. Cultural worldviews infuse life with structure, purpose and meaning. People maintain these fragile constructions by preferring the company of the like-minded. But when faced with a traumatic event, there are times when the horror cannot be assimilated into the framework of the person's existing cultural worldview.
- Self-Esteem: Various studies demonstrate that individuals who have post traumatic stress disorder also have decreased self-esteem. Self-esteem cannot function well as an anxiety buffering system in those who have post traumatic stress disorder as the buffer is weakened in these individuals. High self-esteem can displace defensive responses and buffer against the terror of mortality salience because it is a signal that the individual is living at the standard they should, based on their world view. Self-worth as the terror management theory suggests is an essential component of the existential anxiety- buffering system. PTSD is related to a breakdown in this system, and noted that veterans with past and present, or ongoing PTSD have shown to have lower self-esteem. According to ABDT this leaves this group particularly vulnerable to anxiety, since self-worth is an integral part of the individual's anxiety- buffering mechanism.
- Close Relationships: It is often mentioned that worldview and self-esteem affect ways in which our fears of death are buffered with ABDT. Close relationships also serve as a regulator of these fears. Previous studies hinted at that close relationships played a role in terror management, but they did not conceptualize, theoretically explain, or test the context of close relationships in Terror Management Theories. Close relationships seem to be a product of natural selection because of their reproductive and survival benefits, having reproductive benefits contribute to the survival of people's genes through their offspring. Therefore, close relationships increase the likelihood of mating and brings about other survival skills like gathering food, finding shelter, environmental awareness, and protects offspring from dangers. Love and belongingness are ranked over those of esteem and self- actualization. The formation and maintenance of close relationships have been recognized in both infants and adults as a source of regulating distress. It is also noted that self- esteem can also stem from close relationships. Based on these things it was assumed that formation and maintenance of close relationships may serve as a death- anxiety- buffering mechanism.

Close relationships appear to have inoculating power against basic existential threats, which allows people to respond to these threats by fulfilling relational potentials. Second, it seems the sense of relationship commitment is shaped by not only perceived relational investment, gains, and potential alternatives, as well as the existential need of denial of death awareness. Third, it seems processes of terror management not only include worldview defenses to protect the self, but also promote commitment to significant others and the expansion of the self, provided by these relationships. Close relationships may serve as a fundamental anxiety buffer. It appears close relationships not only protect individuals from concrete and actual threats or danger, but also offer a symbolic shield against the awareness of one's finitude. Since the threat of death is inescapable, the support from those close to us make may make the thought of death more tolerable by giving meaning to our lives by being important to others.

As other anxiety buffers, interpersonal relationships are damaged as well in individuals with post traumatic stress disorder. People with post traumatic stress disorder have higher rates of divorce, more difficulty with their children, are more prone to domestic violence, and are emotionally distant from loved ones. All of these are damaging and as a result, terror management cannot be accomplished through close interpersonal relationships.

== Anxiety buffer disruption theory studies ==
=== Posttraumatic stress reactions ===
A study looked at dissociation responses and PTSD in students who survived the 2005 Zarand earthquake in Iran. The earthquake measured 6.4 on the Richter scale, killed more than 1,500 people and displaced more than 6,700 for two months or more. It looked at dissociation one month later then two years later to see if level of dissociation predicted PTSD.

Four weeks after the earthquake, researchers solicited for volunteers at local universities. All of the participants met the DSM-IV criterion for a Class A1 trauma. Many were wearing black mourning clothes or had injuries from the earthquake.

Three priming conditions were employed: mortality salience, earthquake or dental pain. The researchers then evaluated how the subjects felt toward foreign aid in the wake of the disaster. The results indicated that subjects with high dissociative tendencies showed no effect of mortality salience on attitudes toward the foreign aid. Subjects with low dissociative tendencies reacted as terror management theory predicts when confronted with mortality salience and thought of the earthquake.

Two years after the quake, the researchers returned and 172 of the original respondents participated. They predicted that subjects with high PTSD symptoms would have a disrupted worldview on both foreign aid and the Islamic dress code. They found a strong relationship between dissociation and subsequent PTSD symptom severity. Even after the passage of two years, subjects with high dissociative tendencies were still not defending against existential threats in a way typical for the population who has not experienced trauma.

=== Extent of trauma exposure and PTSD symptom severity ===
An experiment was conducted with 197 students of the University of Ajidjan where they evaluated exposure (proximity) to a traumatic event. In this case, it was geographical location to the civil war. The researchers hypothesized that subjects who lived where the fighting was more constant and intense would be more likely to increase their PTSD reports when mortality was made salient. Those who lived in an area of less conflict should not increase their reports of PTSD. As a form of defensive denial, the researchers predicted they might report lower levels of symptoms. As expected, subjects who had more exposure to war reported greater PTSD symptoms in the mortality salience condition.
