= Terror management theory =

Social and evolutionary psychology theory

Terror management theory (TMT) is a theory in social and evolutionary psychology which proposes a basic psychological conflict stemming from two competing facts of human existence: the instinct for self-preservation, and the realization that death is inevitable and to some extent unpredictable. This conflict produces terror, which is often managed through escapism and cultural beliefs that counter biological reality with more significant and enduring forms of meaning and value—basically countering the personal insignificance represented by death with the significance provided by symbolic culture.

The most obvious examples of cultural values that assuage death anxiety are those that purport to offer literal immortality (e.g. belief in the afterlife through religion). However, TMT also argues that other cultural values – including those that are seemingly unrelated to death – offer symbolic immortality. For example, values of national identity, posterity, cultural perspectives on gender, and human superiority over animals have been linked to calming death concerns. In many cases these values are thought to offer symbolic immortality, by either a) providing the sense that one is part of something greater that will ultimately outlive the individual (e.g. country, lineage, species), or b) making one's symbolic identity superior to biological nature (i.e. one is a personality, which makes one more than a mere collection of cells). Because cultural values influence what is meaningful, they are foundational for self-esteem. TMT describes self-esteem as being the personal, subjective measure of how well an individual is living up to their cultural values.

Terror management theory was developed by Jeff Greenberg, Sheldon Solomon, and Tom Pyszczynski and is codified in their book The Worm at the Core: On the Role of Death in Life (2015). However, the idea of TMT originated from anthropologist Ernest Becker's 1973 Pulitzer Prize-winning work of nonfiction The Denial of Death. Becker argues most human action is taken to ignore or avoid the inevitability of death. The terror of absolute annihilation creates such a profound – albeit subconscious – anxiety in people that they spend their lives attempting to make sense of it. On large scales, societies build symbols: Laws, religious meanings, cultures, and belief systems to explain the significance of life, define what makes certain characteristics, skills, and talents extraordinary, reward others whom they find to exemplify certain attributes, and punish or kill others who do not adhere to their cultural worldview. Adherence to these created "symbols" aids in relieving stresses associated with the reality of mortality. On an individual level, self-esteem provides a buffer against death-related anxiety.

== Background ==
The idea of death, the fear of it, haunts the human animal like nothing else; it is a mainspring of human activity designed largely to avoid the fatality of death, to overcome it by denying in some way that it is the final destiny for man.

— Ernest Becker, 1973

In the 1st century CE, Statius in his Thebaid suggested that "fear first made gods in the world".

Cultural anthropologist Ernest Becker asserted in his 1973 book The Denial of Death that humans, as intelligent animals, are able to grasp the inevitability of death. They therefore spend their lives building and believing in cultural elements that illustrate how to make themselves stand out as individuals and to give their lives significance and meaning. Death creates an anxiety in humans; it strikes at unexpected and random moments, and its nature is essentially unknowable, causing people to spend most of their time and energy to explain, forestall, and avoid it.

Becker expounded upon the previous writings of Sigmund Freud, Søren Kierkegaard, Norman O. Brown, and Otto Rank. According to clinical psychiatrist Morton Levitt, Becker replaces the Freudian preoccupation with sexuality with the fear of death as the primary motivation in human behavior.

People desire to think of themselves as beings of value and worth with a feeling of permanence, a concept in psychology known as self-esteem. This feeling counters the cognitive dissonance created by an individual's realization that they may be no more important than any other living thing. Becker refers to high self-esteem as heroism:

the problem of heroics is the central one of human life, that it goes deeper into human nature than anything else because it is based on organismic narcissism and on the child's need for self-esteem as the condition for his life. Society itself is a codified hero system, which means that society everywhere is a living myth of the significance of human life, a defiant creation of meaning.

The rationale behind decisions regarding one's own health can be explored through a terror-management model. A 2008 research article in Psychological Review proposes a three-part model for understanding how awareness of death can ironically subvert health-promoting behaviors by redirecting one's focus towards behaviors that build self-esteem instead:

Proposition 1 suggests that conscious thoughts about death can instigate health-oriented responses aimed at removing death-related thoughts from current focal attention. Proposition 2 suggests that the unconscious resonance of death-related cognition promotes self-oriented defenses directed toward maintaining, not one's health, but a sense of meaning and self-esteem. The last proposition suggests that confrontations with the physical body may undermine symbolic defenses and thus present a previously unrecognized barrier to health promotion activities.

=== Evolutionary backdrop ===
Terror-management theorists regard TMT as compatible with the theory of evolution: Valid fears of dangerous things have an adaptive function that helped facilitate the survival of our ancestors' genes. However, generalized existential anxiety resulting from the clash between a desire for life and awareness of the inevitability of death is neither adaptive nor selected for. TMT views existential anxiety as an unfortunate byproduct of these two highly adaptive human proclivities rather than as an adaptation that the evolutionary process selected for its advantages. Just as human bipedalism confers advantages as well as disadvantages, death anxiety is an inevitable part of our intelligence and awareness of dangers.

Evolutionary history also indicates that "the costs of ignoring threats have outweighed the costs of ignoring opportunities for self-development."

== Self-esteem ==
Self-esteem lies at the heart of TMT and is a fundamental aspect of its core paradigms. TMT fundamentally seeks to elucidate the causes and consequences of a need for self-esteem. Theoretically, it draws heavily from Ernest Becker's conceptions of culture and self-esteem. TMT not only attempts to explain the concept of self-esteem, it also tries to explain why we need self-esteem. One explanation is that self-esteem is used as a coping mechanism for anxiety. It helps people control their sense of terror and nullify the realization that humans are just animals trying to manage the world around them. According to TMT, self-esteem is a sense of personal value that is created by beliefs in the validity of one's cultural worldview, and the belief that one is living up to the cultural standards created by that worldview.

Critically, Hewstone et al. (2002) have questioned the causal direction between self-esteem and death anxiety, evaluating whether one's self-esteem comes from their desire to reduce their death anxiety, or if death anxiety arises from a lack of self-esteem. In other words, an individual's suppression of death anxiety may arise from their overall need to increase their self-esteem in a positive manner.

Research has demonstrated that self-esteem can play an important role in physical health. In some cases, people may be so concerned with their physical appearance and boosting their self-esteem that they ignore problems or concerns with their own physical health. Arndt et al. (2009) conducted three studies to examine how peer perceptions and social acceptance of smokers contributes to their quitting, as well as if, and why these people continue smoking for outside reasons, even when faced with thoughts of death and anti-smoking prompts. Tanning and exercising were also looked at in the researchers' studies. The studies found that people are influenced by the situations around them. Specifically, Arndt et al. (2009) found in terms of their self-esteem and health, that participants who saw someone exercising were more likely to increase their intentions to exercise. In addition, the researchers found in study two that how participants reacted to an anti-smoking commercial was affected by their motivation for smoking and the situation which they were in. For instance, people who smoked for extrinsic reasons and were previously prompted with death reminders were more likely to be compelled by the anti-smoking message.

=== Self-esteem as anxiety buffer ===
An individual's level of self-consciousness can affect their views on life and death. To a point, increasing self-consciousness is adaptive in that it helps prevent awareness of danger. However, research has demonstrated that there may be diminishing returns from this phenomenon. Individuals with higher levels of self-consciousness sometimes have increased death cognition, and a more negative outlook on life, than those with reduced self-consciousness.

Conversely, self-esteem can work in the opposite manner. Research has confirmed that individuals with higher self-esteem, particularly in regard to their behavior, have a more positive attitude towards their life. Specifically, death cognition in the form of anti-smoking warnings weren't effective for smokers and in fact, increased their already positive attitudes towards the behavior. The reasons behind individuals' optimistic attitudes towards smoking after mortality was made salient, indicate that people use positivity as a buffer against anxiety. Continuing to hold certain beliefs even after they are shown to be flawed creates cognitive dissonance regarding current information and past behavior, and one way to alleviate this is to simply reject new information. Therefore, anxiety buffers such as self-esteem allow individuals to cope with their fears more easily. Death cognition may in fact cause negative reinforcement that leads people to further engage in dangerous behaviors (smoking in this instance) because accepting the new information would lead to a loss of self-esteem, increasing vulnerability and awareness of mortality.

== Mortality salience ==
The mortality salience hypothesis (MS) states that if indeed one's cultural worldview, or one's self-esteem, serves a death-denying function, then threatening these constructs should produce defenses aimed at restoring psychological equanimity (i.e., returning the individual to a state of feeling invulnerable). In the MS paradigm, these "threats" are simply experiential reminders of one's own death. This can, and has, taken many different forms in a variety of study paradigms (e.g., asking participants to write about their own death; conducting the experiment near funeral homes or cemeteries; having participants watch graphic depictions of death, etc.). Like the other TMT hypotheses, the literature supporting the MS hypothesis is vast and diverse. For a meta-analysis of MS research, see Burke et al. (2010).

Experimentally, the MS hypothesis has been tested in close to 200 empirical articles. After participants in an experiment are asked to write about their own death (vs. a neutral, non-death control topic, such as dental pain), and then following a brief delay (distal, worldview/self-esteem defenses work the best after a delay; see Greenberg et al. (1994) for a discussion), the participants' defenses are measured. In one early TMT study assessing the MS hypothesis, Greenberg et al. (1990) had Christian participants evaluate other Christian and Jewish students that were similar demographically, but differed in their religious affiliation. After being reminded of their death (experimental MS induction), Christian participants evaluated fellow Christians more positively, and Jewish participants more negatively, relative to the control condition. Conversely, bolstering self-esteem in these scenarios leads to less worldview defense and derogation of dissimilar others.

Mortality salience has an influence on individuals and their decisions regarding their health. Cox et al. (2009) discuss mortality salience in terms of suntanning. Specifically, the researchers found that participants who were prompted with the idea that pale was more socially attractive, along with mortality reminders, tended to lean towards decisions that resulted in more protective measures from the sun. The participants were placed in two different conditions; one group of participants were given an article relating to the fear of death, while the control group received an article unrelated to death, dealing with the fear of public speaking. Additionally, they gave one group an article pertaining to the message that "bronze is beautiful", one relating to the idea that "pale is pretty", and one neutral article that did not speak of tan or pale skin tones. Finally, after introducing a delay activity, the researchers gave the participants a five-item questionnaire asking them about their future sun-tanning behaviors. The study illustrated that when tan skin was associated with attractiveness, mortality salience positively affected people's intentions to suntan; however, when pale skin was associated with attractiveness, people's intentions to tan decreased.

=== Mortality and self-esteem on health risks ===
Studies have shown that mortality and self-esteem are important factors of the terror management theory. Jessop et al. (2008) study this relationship within four studies that all examine how people react when they are given information on risks, specifically, in terms of the mortality related to the risks of driving. More specifically, the researchers were exploring how participants acted in terms of self-esteem, and its impact on how mortality-related health-risk information would be received. Overall, Jessop et al. (2008) found that even when mortality is prominent, people who engage in certain behaviors to improve their self-esteem have a greater chance of continuing with these activities. Mortality and self-esteem are both factors that influence people's behaviors and decision-making regarding their health. Furthermore, individuals who are involved in behaviors and possess motivation to enhance their self-worth are less likely to be affected by the importance placed on health risks, in terms of mortality.

Self-esteem is important when mortality is made salient. It can allow people a coping mechanism, one that can cushion individuals' fears; and thus, impacting one's attitudes towards a given behavior. Individuals who have higher levels of self-esteem regarding their behavior(s) are less likely to have their attitudes, and thus their behaviors changed regardless of mortality salience or death messages. People will use their self-esteem to hide behind their fears of dying. In terms of smoking behaviors, people with higher smoking-based self-esteem are less susceptible to anti-smoking messages that relate to death; therefore, mortality salience and death warnings afford them with an even more positive outlook on their behavior, or in this instance their smoking.

In the Hansen et al. (2010) experiment the researchers manipulated mortality salience. In the experiment, Hansen et al. (2010) examined smokers' attitudes towards the behavior of smoking. Actual warning labels were utilized to create mortality salience in this specific experiment. The researchers first gave participants a questionnaire to measure their smoking-based self-esteem. Following the questionnaire, participants were randomly assigned to two different conditions; the first were given anti-smoking warning labels about death and the second control group were exposed to anti-smoking warning labels not dealing with death. Before the participants' attitudes towards smoking were taken the researchers introduced an unrelated question to provide a delay. Further research has demonstrated that delays allow mortality salience to emerge because thoughts of death become non-conscious. Finally, participants were asked questions regarding their intended future smoking behavior.

=== Social influences ===
Many people are more motivated by social pressures, rather than health risks. Specifically for younger people, mortality salience is stronger in eliciting changes of one's behavior when it brings awareness to the immediate loss of social status or position, rather than a loss, such as death that one can not imagine and feels far off. However, there are many different factors to take into consideration, such as how strongly an individual feels toward a decision, his or her level of self-esteem, and the situation around the individual. Particularly with people's smoking behaviors, self-esteem and mortality salience have different effects on individuals' decisions. In terms of the longevity of their smoking decisions, it has been seen that individuals' smoking habits are affected, in the short-term sense, when they are exposed to mortality salience that interrelates with their own self-esteem. Moreover, people who viewed social exclusion prompts were more likely to quit smoking in the long run than those who were simply shown health-effects of smoking. More specifically, it was demonstrated that when individuals had high levels of self-esteem they were more likely to quit smoking following the social pressure messages, rather than the health risk messages. In this specific instance, terror management, and specifically mortality salience is showing how people are more motivated by the social pressures and consequences in their environment, rather than consequences relating to their health. This is mostly seen in young adult smokers with higher smoking-based self-esteems who are not thinking of their future health and the less-immediate effects of smoking on their health.

== Death thought accessibility ==
Another paradigm that TMT researchers use to get at unconscious concerns about death is what is known as the death thought accessibility (DTA) hypothesis. Essentially, the DTA hypothesis states that if individuals are motivated to avoid cognitions about death, and they avoid these cognitions by espousing a worldview or by buffering their self-esteem, then when threatened, an individual should possess more death-related cognitions (e.g., thoughts about death, and death-related stimuli) than they would when not threatened.

The DTA hypothesis has its origins in work by Greenberg et al. (1994) as an extension of their earlier terror management hypotheses (i.e., the anxiety buffer hypothesis and the mortality salience hypothesis). The researchers reasoned that if, as indicated by Wegner's research on thought suppression (1994; 1997), thoughts that are purposely suppressed from conscious awareness are often brought back with ease, then following a delay death-thought cognitions should be more available to consciousness than (a) those who keep the death-thoughts in their consciousness the whole time, and (b) those who suppress the death-thoughts but are not provided a delay. That is precisely what they found. However, other psychologists have failed to replicate these findings.

In these initial studies (i.e., Greenberg et al. (2004); Arndt et al. (1997)), and in numerous subsequent DTA studies, the main measure of DTA is a word fragment task, whereby participants can complete word fragments in distinctly death-related ways (e.g., coff_ _ as coffin, not coffee) or in non death-related ways (e.g., sk_ _l as skill, not skull).

=== Importance of the Death Thought Accessibility hypothesis ===
The introduction of this hypothesis has refined TMT, and led to new avenues of research that formerly could not be assessed due to the lack of an empirically validated way of measuring death-related cognitions. Also, the differentiation between proximal (conscious, near, and threat-focused) and distal (unconscious, distant, symbolic) defenses that have been derived from DTA studies have been extremely important in understanding how people deal with their terror.

The DTA paradigm subtly alters, and expands, TMT as a motivational theory. Instead of solely manipulating mortality and witnessing its effects (e.g., nationalism, increased prejudice, risky sexual behavior, etc.), the DTA paradigm allows a measure of the death-related cognitions that result from various affronts to the self. Examples include threats to self-esteem and to one's worldview; the DTA paradigm can therefore assess the role of death-thoughts in self-esteem and worldview defenses. Furthermore, the DTA hypothesis lends support to TMT in that it corroborates its central hypothesis that death is uniquely problematic for human beings, and that it is fundamentally different in its effects than meaning threats (i.e., Heine et al., 2006) and that is death itself, and not uncertainty and lack of control associated with death; Fritsche et al. (2008) explore this idea.

Since its inception, the DTA hypothesis had been rapidly gaining ground in TMT investigations, and as of 2009, has been employed in over 60 published papers, with a total of more than 90 empirical studies.

=== Death anxiety on health promotion ===
How people respond to their fears and anxiety of death is investigated in TMT. Moreover, Taubman-Ben-Ari and Noy (2010) examine the idea that a person's level of self-awareness and self-consciousness should be considered in relation to their responses to their anxiety and death cognitions. The more an individual is presented with their death or death cognitions in general, the more fear and anxiety one may have; therefore, to combat said anxiety one may implement anxiety buffers.

Due to a change in people's lifestyles, in the direction of more unhealthy behaviors, the leading causes of death now, being cancer and heart disease, most definitely are related to individuals' unhealthy behaviors (though the statement is over-generalizing and certainly cannot be applied to every case). Age and death anxiety both are factors that should be considered in the terror management theory, in relation to health-promoting behaviors. Age undoubtedly plays some kind of role in people's health-promoting behaviors; however, an actual age-related effect on death anxiety and health-promoting behaviors has yet to be seen. Although research has demonstrated that for young adults only, when they were prompted with death related scenarios, they yielded more health-promoting behaviors, compared to those participants in their sixties. In addition, death anxiety has been found to have an effect for young adults, on their behaviors of health promotion.

== Terror management health model ==
The terror management health model (TMHM) explores the role that death plays on one's health and behavior. Goldenberg and Arndt (2008) state that the TMHM proposes the idea that death, despite its threatening nature, is in fact instrumental and purposeful in the conditioning of one's behavior towards the direction of a longer life.

According to Goldenberg and Arndt (2008), certain health behaviors such as breast self-exams (BSEs) can consciously activate and facilitate people to think of death, especially their own death. While death can be instrumental for individuals, in some cases, when breast self-exams activate people's death thoughts an obstacle can present itself, in terms of health promotion, because of the experience of fear and threat. Abel and Kruger (2009) have suggested that the stress caused by increased awareness of mortality when celebrating one's birthday might explain the birthday effect, where mortality rates seem to spike around these days.

On the other hand, death and thoughts of death can serve as a way of empowering the self, not as threats. Researchers, Cooper et al. (2011) explored TMHM in terms of empowerment, specifically using BSEs under two conditions; when death thoughts were prompted, and when thoughts of death were non-conscious. According to TMHM, people's health decisions, when death thoughts are not conscious, should be based on their motivations to act appropriately, in terms of the self and identity. Cooper et al. (2011) found that when mortality and death thoughts were primed, women reported more empowerment feelings than those who were not prompted before performing a BSE.

Additionally, TMHM suggests that mortality awareness and self-esteem are important factors in individuals' decision making and behaviors relating to their health. TMHM explores how people will engage in behaviors, whether positive or negative, even with the heightened awareness of mortality, in the attempt to conform to society's expectations and improve their self-esteem. The TMHM is useful in understanding what motivates individuals regarding their health decisions and behaviors.

In terms of smoking behaviors and attitudes, the impact of warnings with death messages depends on:

1. The individuals' level of smoking-based self-esteem
2. The warnings' actual degree of death information

== Emotion ==
People with low self-esteem have more negative emotions when reminded of death compared to people with high self-esteem. A possible explanation posits that these individuals lack the very defenses that TMT argues protect people from mortality concerns (e.g., solid worldviews). In contrast, positive mood states are not impacted by death thoughts for people of low or high self-esteem.

== Leadership ==
It has been suggested that culture provides meaning, organization, and a coherent world-view that diminishes the psychological terror caused by the knowledge of eventual death. The terror management theory can help to explain why a leader's popularity can grow substantially during times of crisis. When a follower's mortality is made prominent they will tend to show a strong preference for iconic leaders. An example of this occurred when George W. Bush's approval rating jumped almost 50 percent following the September 11 attacks in the United States. As Forsyth (2009) posits, this tragedy made U.S. citizens aware of their mortality, and Bush provided an antidote to these existential concerns by promising to bring justice to the terrorist group responsible for the attacks.

Researchers Cohen et al. (2004), in their particular study on TMT, tested the preferences for different types of leaders, while reminding people of their mortality. Three different candidates were presented to participants. The three leaders were of three different types: task-oriented (emphasized setting goals, strategic planning, and structure), relationship-oriented (emphasized compassion, trust, and confidence in others), and charismatic. The participants were then placed in one of two conditions: mortality salient or control group. In the former condition the participants were asked to describe the emotions surrounding their own death, as well as the physical act of the death itself, whereas the control group were asked similar questions about an upcoming exam. The results of the study were that the charismatic leader was favored more, and the relationship-oriented leader was favored less, in the mortality-salient condition. Further research has shown that mortality salient individuals also prefer leaders who are members of the same group, as well as men rather than women (Hoyt et al. 2010). This has links to social role theory.

== Religion ==
TMT posits that religion was created as a means for humans to cope with their own mortality. Supporting this, arguments in favor of life after death, and simply being religious, reduce the effects of mortality salience on worldview defense. Thoughts of death have also been found to increase religious beliefs. At an implicit, subconscious level, this is the case even for people who claim to be nonreligious.

== Mental health ==
Some researchers have argued that death anxiety may play a central role in numerous mental health conditions. To test whether death anxiety causes a particular mental illness, TMT researchers use a mortality salience experiment, and examine whether reminding participants of death leads to increased prevalence of behaviors associated with that mental illness. Such studies have shown that reminders of death lead to increases in compulsive handwashing in obsessive-compulsive disorder, avoidance in spider phobias and social anxiety, and anxious behaviors in other disorders, including panic disorder and health anxiety, suggesting the role of death anxiety in these conditions according to TMT researchers.

== Criticisms ==
Criticisms of terror management theory have been based on several lines of arguments:

- Suppression of fear and anxiety is implausible from an evolutionary point of view.
- The observed psychological responses to terrifying cues are better explained by coalitional psychology and theories of collective defense.
- The responses can be explained as fear of uncertainty and the unknown.
- The responses can be explained as search for meaning of life and mortality.
- The experimental results are difficult to replicate.

These arguments are discussed in the following sections.

=== Evolutionary argument ===
Anxiety and fear are psychological responses that have evolved because they help us avoid danger. A mechanism to suppress anxiety and fear, as postulated by TMT, is unlikely to have evolved because it would reduce the chances of survival. It is argued that TMT relies on misguided assumptions about evolved human nature originating from psychoanalytic theory. Proponents of TMT argue that the cultural self-esteem that counters death anxiety is either a spandrel or exaptation created as a byproduct of the human survival instinct being impinged upon by the awareness of death brought about by increased intelligence. It is not responses to immediate danger that are suppressed, but existential reminders of mortality. They posit a "dual defense model" whereby "proximal" and "distal" defenses deal with threats differently, with the former doing so more "pragmatically" due to greater conscious awareness, and the latter more symbolically due to unconscious thought recession. Critics argue that the observed responses are not only evoked by cues of essential mortality, but more generally by cues of danger or insecurity.

=== Coalitional psychology and collective defense as alternative explanations ===
TMT posits that people respond to cues about mortality by strengthening shared worldviews. Critics believe that such a worldview defense is better explained by coalitional psychology. People confronted with danger tend to build shared worldviews and a pro-normative orientation in order to garner social support and to build coalitions and alliances. Proponents of TMT argue that the coalitional psychology theory is a black box explanation that 1) cannot account for the fact that virtually all cultures have a supernatural dimension; 2) does not explain why cultural worldview defense is symbolic, involving allegiance to both specific and general systems of abstract meaning unrelated to specific threats, rather than focused on the specific adaptive threats it supposedly evolved to deal with; and, 3) dismisses TMT's dual process account of the underlying processes that generate MS effects without providing an alternative of any kind or attempting to account for the data relevant to this aspect of the TMT analysis. The coalitional theory is supported by a large statistical study finding that conservatism, traditionalism, and other responses represented by TMT theory are connected with collective danger, while individual danger has very different and often opposite effects. The observed connection with collective danger supports the coalitional theory, while contradicting CP's interpretation of TMT, which is understood as explicitly dealing with individual danger only. TMT theorists however, have explained how CP dismisses TMT's dual process shown in lab studies whereby proximal and distal defenses deal with threats differently; with the former doing so more "pragmatically" due to greater conscious awareness, and the latter more symbolically due to unconscious thought recession. This would account for the study's distinction between individual and collective danger — with the former being more proximal and the latter more distal. Unlike TMT, CP does not view national, political and religious coalitions as imagined communities that represent primarily cultural worldviews (distal defenses). Similarly, another study has found that the response of system justification postulated by TMT theorists is increased by salience of terrorism, not by salience of individual mortality. Earlier experimental findings can be explained by the fact that individual danger and collective danger are seriously confounded. The findings that the observed responses are connected with collective danger rather than individual danger was predicted by regality theory. This finding is in agreement with authoritarianism theory, realistic group conflict theory, and Ronald Inglehart's theory of modernization, but not in agreement with CP's interpretation of terror management theory, which omits its distal/proximal dual defense model.

=== Prevalence of death ===
Since findings on mortality salience and worldview defense were first published, other researchers have claimed that the effects may have been obtained due to reasons other than death itself, such as anxiety, fear, or other aversive stimuli such as pain. The experimental manipulations in TMT research are likely to elicit a mixture of different types of negative emotions, including fear, anxiety, sadness, and anger.

Other studies have found effects similar to those that mortality salience results in – for example, thinking about difficult personal choices to be made, being made to respond to open-ended questions regarding uncertainty, thinking about being robbed, thinking about being socially isolated, and being told that one's life lacks meaning. While these cases exist, thoughts of death have since been compared to various aversive experimental controls, such as (but not limited to) thinking about: failure, writing a critical exam, public speaking with a considerable audience, being excluded, paralysis, dental pain, intense physical pain, etc.

With regards to the studies that found similar effects, TMT theorists have argued that in the previously mentioned studies where death was not the subject thought about, the subjects would quite easily be related to death in an individual's mind due to "linguistic or experiential connection with mortality" (p. 332). For example, being robbed invokes thoughts of violence and being unsafe in one's own home – many people have died trying to protect their property and family. A second possible explanation for these results involves the death-thought accessibility hypothesis: these threats somehow sabotage crucial anxiety-buffering aspects of an individual's worldview or self-esteem, which increases their death thought accessibility. For example, one study found increased death thought accessibility in response to thoughts of antagonistic relations with attachment figures. However, this makes it difficult or impossible to isolate the effect of mortality salience.

While many TMT theorists claim that affective responses to mortality salience are suppressed and pushed out of consciousness, later studies contradict this and show that affective responses are indeed observable.

=== Meaning maintenance model ===
The meaning maintenance model (MMM) was initially introduced as a comprehensive motivational theory that claimed to subsume TMT, with alternative explanations for TMT findings. Essentially, it posits that people automatically give meaning to things, and when those meanings are somehow disrupted, it causes anxiety. In response, people concentrate on "meaning maintenance to reestablish their sense of symbolic unity" and that such "meaning maintenance often involves the compensatory reaffirmation of alternative meaning structures". These meanings, among other things, should "provide a basis for prediction and control of our...environments, help [one] to cope with tragedy and trauma...and the symbolic cheating of death via adherence to the enduring values that these cultures provide".

While TMT regards the search for meaning as a defense mechanism, meaning management theory regards the quest for meaning as a primary motive because we are meaning-seeking and meaning-making creatures living in a world of meanings. When people are exposed to mortality salience, both TMT and meaning management theory would predict an increase in pro-culture and pro-esteem activities, but for very different reasons. The latter theory is replacing death denial by death acceptance.

TMT theorists argue that meaning management theory cannot describe why different sets of meaning are preferred by different people, and that different types of meaning have different psychological functions. TMT theorists argue that unless something is an important element of a person's anxiety-buffering worldview or self-esteem, it will not require broad meaning maintenance. TMT theorists believe that meaning management theory cannot accurately claim to be an alternative to TMT because it does not seem to be able to explain the current breadth of TMT evidence.

=== Offensive defensiveness ===
Some theorists have argued that it is not the idea of death and nonexistence that is unsettling to people, but the fact that uncertainty is involved. For example, these researchers posited that people defend themselves by altering their fear responses from uncertainty to an enthusiasm approach. Other researchers argue for distinguishing fear of death from fear of dying and, therein, posit that ultimately the fear of death has more to do with some other fear (e.g., fear of pain) or reflects uncertainty avoidance or fear of the unknown.

TMT theorists agree that uncertainty can be disconcerting in some cases and it may even result in defense responses, but note that they believe the inescapability of death and the possibility of its finality regarding one's existence is most unsettling. They also note that people actually seek out some types of uncertainty, and that being uncertain is not always very unpleasant. In contrast, there is substantial evidence that, all things being equal, uncertainty and the unknown represent fundamental fears and are only experienced as pleasant when there is sufficient contextual certainty. For example, a surprise involves uncertainty, but is only perceived as pleasant if there is sufficient certainty that the surprise will be pleasant.

Though TMT theorists acknowledge that many responses to mortality salience involve greater approaches (zealousness) towards important worldviews, they also note examples of mortality salience which resulted in the opposite, which offensive defensiveness cannot account for: when negative features of a group to which participants belong were made salient, people actively distanced themselves from that group under mortality salience.

=== Replication failure ===
In addition to the criticisms from alternative theoretical perspectives, a large-scale attempt by Many Labs 4 to replicate published findings failed to replicate the mortality salience effect on worldview defense under any condition. The test is a multi-lab replication of Study 1 of Greenberg et al. (1994). Psychologists in 21 labs across the U.S. re-executed the original experiment among a total of 2,200 participants. In response to the Many Labs 4 paper, Tom Pyszczynski (one of the founding psychologists of TMT), criticized the study for insufficient sample sizes, failure to follow the advice of researchers, and deviation from a preregistered protocol.

== Popularity ==
Psychologist Yoel Inbar summarized the popularity of the theory:

I can not explain to people who were not around during this time - which I would say was roughly 2004 to 2008 - how much everything at the time was about terror management theory. You would go to SPSP and it seemed like half of the posters were about terror management theory. It was just everywhere. There is just an explosion of terror management theory stuff. And then it sort of receded. And now you barely see it. Which is also kind of weird. We were obsessed with this for a period of 3-5 years, then we moved on to other things.

== See also ==
- Anxiety buffer disruption theory – Application of terror management theory
- Being toward death (German: Sein-zum-Tode), an important concept in the work of Martin Heidegger
- Chamber of Reflection – Initiation ritual in freemasonry
- Cognitive dissonance – Mental phenomenon of holding contradictory beliefs
- Death anxiety – Anxiety caused by thoughts of death
- Flight from Death – a documentary film based on Ernest Becker's work and terror management theory
- Memento mori – Artistic or symbolic reminder of the inevitability of death
- Mortality salience – Awareness about death
- Necrophobia – Fear of dead organisms
- Protection motivation theory

== Bibliography ==
- Becker, Ernest (1973). The Denial of Death, The Free Press. ISBN 0-02-902380-7
- Pyszczynski, Thomas; Solomon, Sheldon; Greenberg, Jeff (2003). In the Wake of 9/11: The Psychology of Terror, American Psychological Association. ISBN 1-55798-954-0
- Solomon, Sheldon, Greenberg, J. & Pyszczynski, T. (1991) "A terror management theory of social behavior: The psychological functions of esteem and cultural worldviews", in M. P. Zanna (Ed.) Advances in Experimental Social Psychology, Volume 24, Academic Press, pp. 93–159. ISBN 0-12-015224-X
