= Jeff Greenberg =

Jeff Greenberg may refer to:

- Jeff Greenberg (professor), American social psychology professor
- Jeff Greenberg (sports executive), American sports executive
