= Angst =

Intense feeling of apprehension, anxiety, or inner turmoil

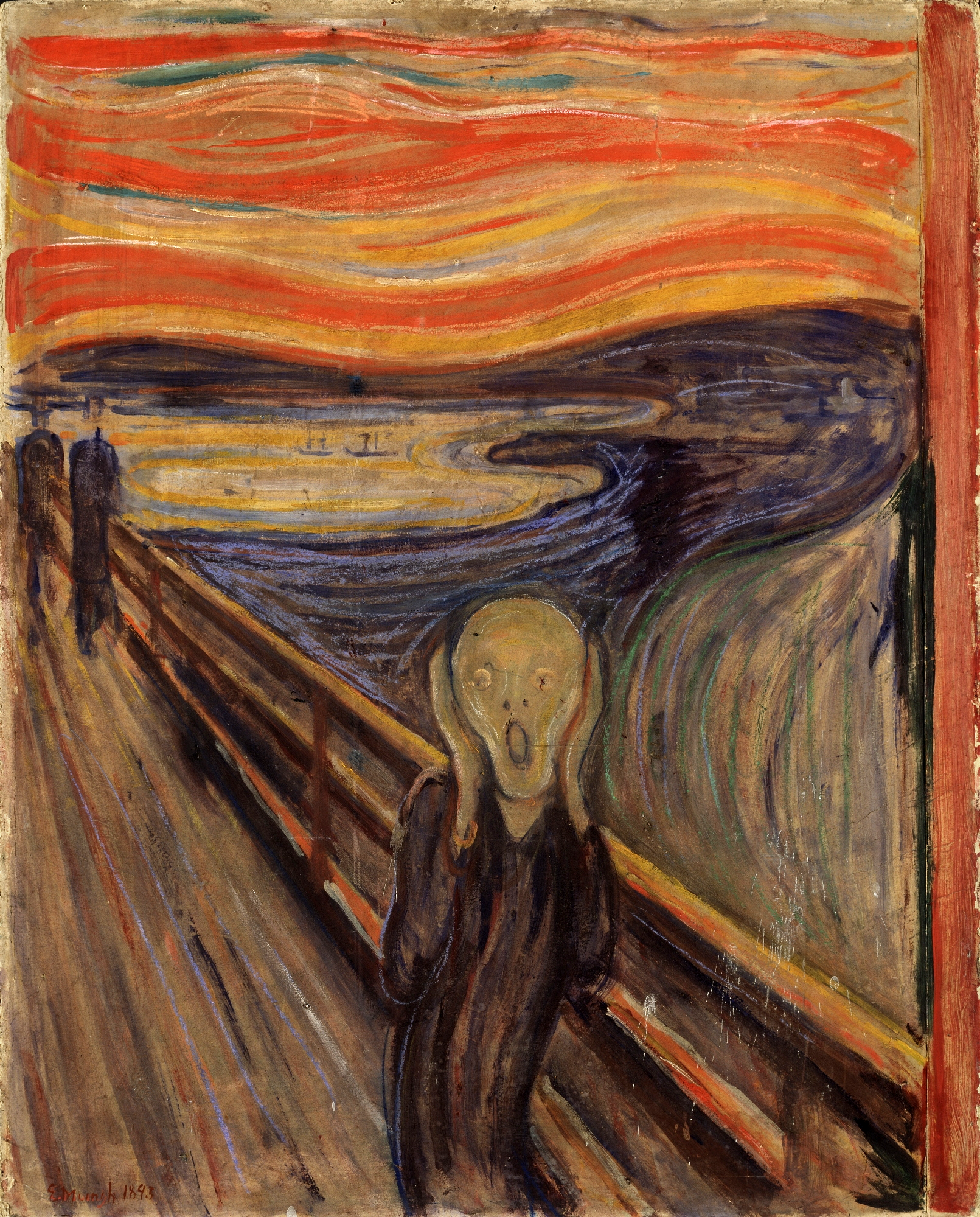
The Scream (1893) by Edvard Munch represents his experience of "an infinite scream passing through nature."

Angst is a feeling of anxiety, apprehension, or insecurity. Anguish is its Latinate equivalent, and the words anxious and anxiety are of similar origin.

== Etymology ==
The word angst was introduced into English from the Danish, Norwegian, and Dutch word angst and the German word Angst. It is attested since the 19th century in English translations of the works of Søren Kierkegaard and Sigmund Freud. It is used in English to describe an intense feeling of apprehension, anxiety, or inner turmoil.

In other languages (with words from the Latin pavor for "fear" or "panic"), the derived words differ in meaning; for example, as in the French anxiété and peur. The word angst has existed in German since the 8th century, from the Proto-Indo-European root *anghu-, "restraint" from which Old High German angust developed. It is pre-cognate with the Latin angustia, "tensity, tightness" and angor, "choking, clogging"; compare to the Ancient Greek ἄγχω (ánkhō) "strangle". It entered English in the 19th century as a technical term used in psychiatry, though earlier cognates existed, such as ange.

== Existentialism ==
In existentialist philosophy, the term angst carries a specific conceptual meaning. The use of the term was first attributed to Danish philosopher Søren Kierkegaard (1813–1855). In The Concept of Anxiety (originally translated as The Concept of Dread), Kierkegaard used the word Angest (in common Danish, angst, meaning "dread" or "anxiety") to describe a profound and deep-seated condition. Where non-human animals are guided solely by instinct, said Kierkegaard, human beings enjoy a freedom of choice that we find both appealing and terrifying. It is the anxiety of understanding of being free when considering undefined possibilities of one's life and the immense responsibility of having the power of choice over them. Kierkegaard's concept of angst reappeared in the works of existentialist philosophers who followed, such as Friedrich Nietzsche, Jean-Paul Sartre, and Martin Heidegger, each of whom developed the idea further in individual ways. While Kierkegaard's angst referred mainly to ambiguous feelings about moral freedom within a religious personal belief system, later existentialists discussed conflicts of personal principles, cultural norms, and existential despair.

== Music ==
Existential angst makes its appearance in classical musical composition in the early twentieth century, both as a result of philosophical developments and as a reflection of the war-torn times. Notable composers whose works are often linked with the concept include Gustav Mahler, Richard Strauss (operas Elektra and Salome), Claude Debussy (opera Pelléas et Mélisande, ballet Jeux), Jean Sibelius (especially the Fourth Symphony), Arnold Schoenberg (A Survivor from Warsaw), Alban Berg, Francis Poulenc (opera Dialogues of the Carmelites), Dmitri Shostakovich (opera Lady Macbeth of Mtsensk, symphonies and chamber music), Béla Bartók (opera Bluebeard's Castle), and Krzysztof Penderecki (especially Threnody to the Victims of Hiroshima).

Angst began to be discussed in reference to popular music in the mid- to late 1950s, amid widespread concerns over international tensions and nuclear proliferation. Jeff Nuttall's book Bomb Culture (1968) traced angst in popular culture to Hiroshima. Dread was expressed in works of folk rock such as Bob Dylan's "Masters of War" (1963) and "A Hard Rain's a-Gonna Fall". The term often makes an appearance in reference to punk rock, grunge, nu metal, and works of emo where expressions of melancholy, existential despair, or nihilism predominate.

== See also ==
- Anger – Intense hostile emotional state of mind
- Byronic hero – Type of antihero often characterized by isolation and contemplation
- Emotion – Conscious subjective experience of humans
- Existentialism – Philosophical form of enquiry into subjective existence
- Franz Kafka – Austrian and Czech writer (1883–1924)
- Emotion classification#Lists of emotions – Contrast of one emotion from another
- Death anxiety – Anxiety caused by thoughts of death
- Sehnsucht – German noun for an emotion of longing
- Alienation – Disconnection in social relationships
- Sturm und Drang – Proto-Romantic movement in German literature and music
- Terror management theory – Social and evolutionary psychology theory
- Weltschmerz – German word for deep sadness about the state of the world
