= Counterwill =

Psychoanalytic concept

Counterwill is a psychological term that means instinctive resistance to any sense of coercion.

The term was first used by Austrian psychoanalyst Otto Rank and has been popularized by developmental psychologist Gordon Neufeld. In Neufeld's model, counterwill is a functional attribute of human behavior in that it protects personal boundaries and enables individuation. It has also been described as "will in reaction to the will of others".
