= Sheldon Solomon =

American social psychologist

- Education: Franklin and Marshall College (B.A.); University of Kansas (Ph.D.)
- Known for: Terror management theory
- Scientific career
- Fields: Social psychology; Evolutionary psychology
- Workplaces: Skidmore College

Sheldon Solomon is an American social psychologist. He is a professor of psychology at Skidmore College in Saratoga Springs, New York. Solomon is best known for developing terror management theory, along with Jeff Greenberg and Tom Pyszczynski. This theory is concerned with how humans deal with their own sense of mortality.

== Education and career ==
Solomon earned his B.A. from Franklin & Marshall College and his Ph.D. from the University of Kansas.

Currently the Ross Professor for Interdisciplinary Studies at Skidmore College, he is best known for developing terror management theory. Solomon, Jeff Greenberg, and Tom Pyszczynski co-authored the book The Worm at the Core: On the role of Death in Life in 2015.

He is also the author and co-author of more than one hundred articles and several books, and he has been featured in several films, including Flight from Death and Planet of the Humans. In the latter, he links the pursuit of renewable energy sources, such as wind and solar, to the reluctance of humans to face their own mortality.

== Personal life ==
Solomon co-founded Esperanto, a restaurant in Saratoga Springs, and invented the "doughboy"—dough filled with cheese, chicken, and spices.
