= Birthday effect =

Phenomenon related to one's death date

The birthday effect (sometimes called the birthday blues, especially when referring specifically to suicide) is a statistical phenomenon where an individual's likelihood of death appears to increase on or close to their birthday. The birthday effect has been seen in studies of general populations in England and Wales, Switzerland, Ukraine, and the United States, as well as in smaller populations such as Major League Baseball players. Studies do not consistently show this effect; some studies find that men's and women's mortality rates diverge in the run-up to the birthday, while others find no significant gender effect. Suggested mechanisms for the effect include alcohol consumption, psychological stress relating to the birthday, increased suicide risk, terminally ill patients attempting to hold on until their birthday, an increased mortality salience, or a physiological cycle that causes the body to weaken annually. It has also been suggested that it may be a statistical artifact, perhaps as a result of anomalies in reporting, but the birthday effect has also been seen in studies that control for known reporting anomalies.

== Studies ==
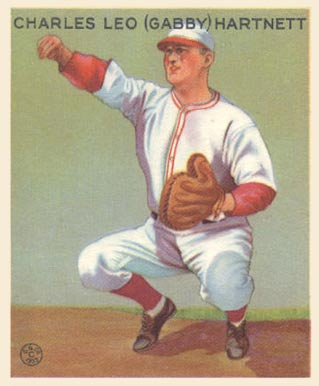
Gabby Hartnett is one of the statistically unusual number of MLB players to have died on his birthday.

With the introduction of statistical software that can process large datasets easily, a number of state- or countrywide studies have been carried out to investigate whether birthdays have any effect on mortality. The first large-scale study used the records of 2,745,149 Californians who died between 1969 and 1990. After correcting for confounding factors such as seasonality in deaths, elective surgery, and people born on February 29, there was a significant increase in deaths in the week before the individual's birthday for men, and in the week after the birthday for women—in both cases, mortality did not peak on the birthday, but close to it. This effect was consistent across age and race cohorts.

A similar study among 12,275,033 Swiss found the highest mortality on the actual birthday (17% greater than the expected value), and the effect was largest for those over 80; another study on Swiss data found a 13.8% excess and was able to link this to specific causes: heart attack and stroke (predominant in women) and suicides and accidents (predominant in men), as well as an increase in cancer deaths. Among 25 million Americans who died between 1998 and 2011, 6.7% more people than expected die on their birthday, and the effect was most pronounced at weekends and among the young—among 20- to 29-year-olds, the excess was over 25%. An even greater excess was found in the population of Kyiv, where—between 1990 and 2000—there were 44.4% more deaths than expected among men on their birthdays and 36.2% more than expected among women. Smaller biographical studies have also shown a birthday effect within subpopulations, such as among Major League Baseball (MLB) players and people with entries in the Encyclopedia of American History.

Alexander Nemtsov's study in Russia, based on data from 16.8 million Russians who died between January 1, 2011, and December 31, 2019, found that excess mortality during the 15 days after a birthday amounted to 19,700 people. This represents a 3.5% higher death rate than on any other non-holiday days. On the birthday itself, 4,000 deaths occurred, which is 21% higher than on other days. The proportion of deaths from external causes nearly tripled: deaths from drowning increased by 48.3%, the proportion of deaths from alcohol poisoning rose by 30%, and mortality from road traffic accidents and other accidents also increased.

Focusing on suicide deaths alone, large studies have found evidence for a peak in suicides on or just after a birthday in Denmark and Hungary, but not in Bavaria or Taiwan.

However, other studies have not found such a correlation. A study using the populations of Denmark and Austria (a total of 2,052,680 deaths over the time period) found that although people's lifespan tended to correlate with their month of birth, there was no consistent birthday effect, and people born in autumn or winter were more likely to die in the months further from their birthday. A study of all cancer deaths in Germany from 1995 to 2009 found no evidence of a birthday effect, although it did find a related Christmas effect. A small study by Leonard Zusne found birthday effects among both male and female cohorts, where women were more likely to die immediately before a birthday and men more likely to die immediately after, but that, when averaged together, there was no birthday effect among the population as a whole. The same was found for a study of mortality data in England and Wales, where there was a statistically significant birthday effect among each subgroup (men and women; never married, married, divorced and widowed), but it was not seen in the population as a whole.

A study found that the risk of suicide may be greater for males on their birthday.

== Possible explanations ==
=== Alcohol ===
Birthday celebrations are often associated with large increases in alcohol consumption. Binge drinking can increase an individual's risk of death through alcohol intoxication, accidents and drunk driving, as well as by exacerbating existing conditions and increasing suicide risk. In the United States, where the legal minimum drinking age is 21, there is a very large mortality rate excess on the 21st birthday and the day immediately following, almost entirely attributable to an increase in accidents.

=== Psychosomatic and psychological ===
Two mutually contradictory explanations have been put forward that rely on psychosomatic effects. On the one hand, a birthday provides a fixed date on which to focus, allowing the terminally ill to hold on until the day itself. On the other hand, a birthday also reminds the individual of mortality and offers an occasion to look back on life. According to the terror management theory, this causes stress, which can accelerate death. The uneven mortality rate distribution between men and women, and between more and less successful baseball players, suggests that both may play a role in the birthday effect: people who have focused on the public sphere of life (for example, career-driven people or professional athletes) might be reminded that their glory days have passed, while those who lived more in the private sphere (such as stay-at-home parents and amateur sports players) are more aware of what they will lose in death and try to hold on. Related is the "broken promise effect", whereby a person suffering suicidal ideation will wait until a birthday or other significant event to see whether their circumstances will improve.

This model would also explain the similar increase in cancer deaths around holidays such as Christmas, and is supported by the fact that such phenomena appear to be dependent on culture—there is a Passover effect among the Jewish community (which moves with the festival), and a Mid-Autumn Festival effect among the Chinese.

Additionally, the absence of birthday acknowledgments or celebrations may contribute to feelings of loneliness and social isolation. An individual who receives no birthday wishes may feel that they have no one in their life, or interpret the lack of acknowledgment as an indication that no one remembered their birthday or cared enough to acknowledge it or make the occasion feel special. When the day passes seemingly like any other, it may reinforce feelings of being forgotten, unwanted, unimportant, or alone, possibly even creating the impression that their very existence and birth hold little significance to those around them. For some individuals, this perceived or actual lack of social connection may intensify feelings of sadness associated with their birthday.

=== Physiological ===
It has been suggested that, like the 24-hour circadian rhythm, the body also has a yearly "circannual" biological rhythm. Vaiserman et al. have suggested that the climatic conditions at birth act as a zeitgeber that triggers internal stress and increases the chance of death.

=== Statistical ===
It is possible when processing death certificates to confuse the date of birth and date of death fields, which would increase the apparent number of certificates in which these coincide. Additionally, where the exact date is not known, the 1st and 15th of the month are often used as placeholders. These will cause an excess of births and deaths recorded on these dates. However, studies also find changes in the mortality rate in the days immediately before and after, which are unlikely to be caused by data processing anomalies, suggesting that statistical artifacts alone cannot explain the birthday effect.
