= The Trauma of Birth =

1924 book by Otto Rank

- Cover of the first edition
- Author: Otto Rank
- Original title: Das Trauma der Geburt
- Language: German
- Published: 1924 (in German); 1929 (in English)
- Publication place: Germany
- Media type: Print (Hardcover and Paperback)
- Pages: 224 (Dover edition)
- ISBN: 0-486-27974-X (Dover edition)

The Trauma of Birth (German: Das Trauma der Geburt) is a 1924 book by the psychoanalyst Otto Rank. It was first published in English translation in 1929. Especially with its focus on the connection between microcosm and macrocosm, it foreshadows Rank's most popular book, Art and Artist, published in 1932 and considered a masterpiece by scholars of art history. Sigmund Freud, the founder of psychoanalysis, reacted both favorably and critically to The Trauma of Birth, responding to Rank's ideas in his own work.

== Summary ==
Rank aims to apply psychoanalysis to "the comprehension of the whole development of mankind, even of the actual fact of becoming human.". The chief purpose of the work, according to Rank, is elaboration of how the form of the womb expresses the protective forms of art, myth, religion, philosophy and culture.

== Publication history ==
The Trauma of Birth was first published in 1924. The book was published in English by Kegan Paul, Trench, Trubner and Co., Ltd. in 1929. The book was republished, with a new introduction by E. James Lieberman, by Dover Publications in 1993.

== Reception ==
Sigmund Freud, the founder of psychoanalysis, read the manuscript, and initially welcomed the book, writing to Rank to tell him that he would accept its dedication to him. Freud's attitude to the book later changed, and he alternated between praising it and criticizing it. Several members of a committee secretly established in 1913 to protect Freud reacted more harshly to The Trauma of Birth. The psychoanalysts Karl Abraham and Ernest Jones expressed opposition to the work, since they believed that it implicitly contradicted some of Freud's basic ideas. The author Richard Webster suggested that Abraham and Jones were correct in this belief. Freud's Inhibitions, Symptoms, and Anxiety (1926) was a response to The Trauma of Birth.

Lieberman described The Trauma of Birth as one of "the most remarkable books in the history of psychology", and wrote that it presents insights "set in solid historical, philosophical, anthropological, artistic and literary foundations." He suggested that the work was "feminist" in its criticism of an ideology that emphasized men's perspectives at the expense of those of women and its recognition of the importance of early mother–child relationships. In his view, clinical evidence supports "Rank's observation that the ending of treatment brought forth dreams and strong emotions replete with birth symbolism." He maintained that other writers distorted Rank's ideas, for example by attempting to connect them to the obstetrician Frédérick Leboyer's views about natural childbirth and the psychologist Arthur Janov's primal therapy, or by falsely claiming that Rank believed that all children should be born by Caesarean section to prevent birth traumas. He suggested that Rank was responsible for some of this confusion, by speaking of more and less severe birth traumas.
