= Arturo de Hoyos =

Mexican Mormon academic (1925–2016)

Arturo de Hoyos (September 21, 1925 - June 12, 2016) was a professor at Brigham Young University (BYU) and president of the Universidad Hispana in Provo, Utah.

== Early life and education ==
Hoyos was born in Piedras Negras, Coahuila, Mexico and raised in Chihuahua State and Sonora State in Northern Mexico. He served a mission for the Church of Jesus Christ of Latter-day Saints (LDS Church) and then studied at BYU.

De Hoyos received a Ph.D. from Michigan State University. His wife Genevive de Hoyos received her Ph.D. from Indiana University, and Arturo was a member of the psychology faculty at that institution. He also served on the faculty of DePauw University for a time.

== Career ==
By 1971 De Hoyos was serving as coordinator of graduate studies for Latino and Native American Students at Brigham Young University. In 1971 Arturo de Hoyos was also serving as a branch president of what was then the Spanish-American branch in the Utah Stake. The Utah Stake was in 1974 renamed the Provo Central Stake and the Spanish-American branch was thus the ancestor of what is today the Pioneer 5th Branch in the Provo Utah Central Stake.

De Hoyos later served as president of the Mexico Tijuana Mission of the LDS Church.

Arturo and Genevieve conducted several psychological studies related to family structure and stability. They have also written papers on the sociological issues of The Church of Jesus Christ of Latter-day Saints becoming an international institution.

== Personal life ==
De Hoyos married Genevieve Edouarette Argault. Genevieve was born in Autun, France. She had served a mission in Uruguay.

(Arturo de Hoyos should not be confused with his nephew who is also named Arturo de Hoyos (b. 1959) who is an expert on Freemasonry and currently serves as the Grand Archivist and Grand Historian of the Southern Jurisdiction of the Scottish Rite in the USA. This second Arturo de Hoyos was raised in Provo, and is the son of Dr. Benjamin Federico de Hoyos and Josefine Emma Zwahlen).
