= Death anxiety =

Anxiety caused by thoughts of death

- Other names: Thanatophobia
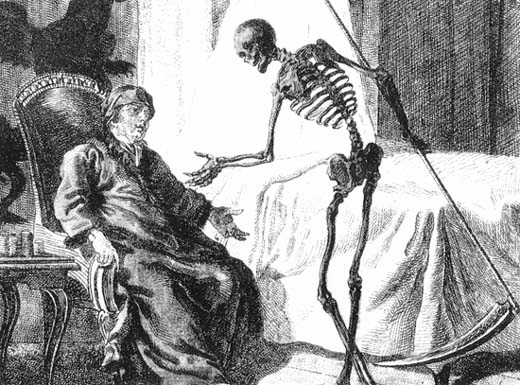
- An illustration from La Fontaine's fable "La Mort et le Mourant" depicting the Grim Reaper
- Specialty: Clinical psychology, psychiatry

Death anxiety is anxiety caused by thoughts of one's own death, and is also known as thanatophobia (fear of death). This anxiety can significantly impact various aspects of a person's life. Death anxiety is distinct from necrophobia, which refers to an irrational or disproportionate fear of dead bodies or of anything associated with death. Death anxiety has been found to affect people of differing demographic groups as well, such as men versus women, and married versus non-married. The sociological and psychological consensus is that death anxiety is universally present across all societies, but different cultures manifest aspects of death anxiety in differing ways and degrees.

Death anxiety is particularly prevalent in individuals who experience terminal illnesses without a medical curable treatment, such as advanced cancer.

Researchers have linked death anxiety with several mental health conditions, as it often acts as a fundamental fear that underlies many mental health disorders. Common therapies that have been used to treat death anxiety include cognitive behavioral therapy, meaning-centered therapies, and mindfulness-based approaches.

== Types ==
Psychotherapist Robert Langs (1928–2014) proposed three different causes of death anxiety: predatory, predator, and existential. In addition to his research, many theorists such as Sigmund Freud, Erik Erikson, and Ernest Becker have examined death anxiety and its impact on cognitive processing.

=== Predatory death anxiety ===
People experience death anxiety both consciously and unconsciously. Concerns about death play a significant role in the development of many emotional dysfunctions. Predatory death anxiety arises from the fear of being harmed. It is the oldest and most basic form of death anxiety, with origins in the first unicellular organisms' set of adaptive resources. Unicellular organisms have receptors that have evolved to react to external dangers, along with self-protective, responsive mechanisms made to increase the likelihood of survival in the face of chemical and physical forms of attack or danger. In humans, predatory death anxiety is evoked by a variety of dangerous situations that put one at risk or threaten one's survival. Predatory death anxiety mobilizes an individual's adaptive resources and leads to a fight-or-flight response, consisting of active efforts to combat the danger or attempts to escape the threatening situation.

=== Predation or predator death anxiety ===
Predation or predator death anxiety is a form that arises when an individual harms another, physically and/or mentally. This form of death anxiety is often accompanied by unconscious guilt. In Freudian theory, unconscious guilt is genetically embedded into people from their prehistory, religious upbringing, ancestral religious affiliation, and a person's personal ethics. The unconscious sense of guilt and its effects are not truly unconscious. The idea or impulse that has undergone repression creates a rising feeling of guilt due to disproportionate feelings. This guilt, in turn, motivates and encourages a variety of self-made decisions and actions by the perpetrator of harm to others.

=== Existential death anxiety ===
Existential death anxiety stems from the basic knowledge that human life must end. Existential death anxiety is known to be the most powerful form of death anxiety. It is said that language has created the basis for existential death anxiety through communicative and behavioral changes. Other factors include an awareness of the distinction between self and others, a full sense of personal identity, and the ability to anticipate the future. The existential psychiatrist Irvin Yalom asserts that humans are prone to death anxiety because "our existence is forever shadowed by the knowledge that we will grow, blossom, and inevitably, diminish and die."

Human beings are the only living things that are truly aware of their own mortality and spend time pondering the meaning of life and death. Awareness of human mortality arose some 150,000 years ago. In that relatively short span of evolutionary time, humans have fashioned a single basic mechanism through which they deal with the existential death anxieties this awareness has evoked: denial. Denial is affected through a wide range of mental mechanisms and physical actions, many of which go unrecognized. While denial can be adaptive in limited use, excessive use is more common and is emotionally costly. Denial is the root of such diverse actions as breaking rules, violating frames and boundaries, manic celebrations, directing violence against others, attempting to gain extraordinary wealth and power, and more. These pursuits are often activated by a death-related trauma, and while they may lead to constructive actions, more often than not they lead to actions that are damaging to self and others.

== Measuring death anxiety ==
There are many ways to measure death anxiety and fear. In 1972, Katenbaum and Aeinsberg devised three propositions for this measurement. From this start, the ideologies about death anxiety have been able to be recorded and their attributes listed. Methods such as imagery tasks to simple questionnaires and apperception tests such as the Stroop test enable psychologists to adequately determine if a person is under stress due to death anxiety or post-traumatic stress disorder.

The Lester Attitude Toward Death Scale was developed in 1966 by David Lester but not published until 1991 when its validity was established. By measuring the general attitude towards death and also the inconsistencies with death attitudes, participants are scaled to their favorable value towards death.

The Death Anxiety Scale (DAS) was created 1970 by Templer and is one of the most widely used tools to assess death anxiety today. This scale is a self-report questionnaire that contains 15 true or false items and uses individual's death-related levels of fear and anxiety. Being the first standardized assessment tool at the time specifically for measuring death anxiety, and heavily used in both clinical and nonclinical environments; The Death Anxiety Scale (DAS) played a big part in shaping the observational understanding of death anxiety.

=== Sex ===
The connection between death anxiety and one's sex appears to be strong. Studies show that females tend to have more death anxiety than males. In 1984, Thorson and Powell did a study to investigate this connection, and they sampled men and women from 16 years of age to over 60. The Death Anxiety Scale, and other scales such as the Collett-Lester Fear of Death Scale, showed higher mean scores for women than for men. Moreover, researchers believe that age and culture could be major influences in why women score higher on death anxiety scales than men.

Through the evolutionary period, a basic method was created to deal with death anxiety and also as a means of dealing with loss. Denial is used when memories or feelings are too painful to accept and are often rejected. Maintaining that the event never happened rather than accepting it allows an individual more time to work through the inevitable pain. When a loved one dies in a family, denial is often implemented as a means to come to grips with the reality that the person is gone. Closer families often deal with death better than when coping individually. As society and families drift apart so does the time spent bereaving those who have died, which in turn leads to negative emotion and negativity towards death. Mothers hold greater concerns about death due to their caring role within the family. It is this common role of women that leads to greater death anxiety as it emphasize the 'importance to live' for her offspring. Although it is common knowledge that all living creatures die, many people do not accept their own mortality, preferring not to accept that death is inevitable, and that they will one day die.

=== Age and sex ===
Using the Collett-Lester Fear of Death scale, studies can be performed to examine the age and sex effects on death anxiety. In 2007, two studies were compared to support these claims and they discovered the evidence that was needed. The studies claim that death anxiety peaks in men and women when in their 20s, but after this group, sex plays a role in the path that one takes. Either sex can experience a decline in death concerns with age, but the studies show an unexpected second spike in women during their early 50s. Regardless of sex, once the age of 60 is reached death anxiety levels seem to decrease and stabilize to a low level.

According to a study of elderly men and women in a care facility, many were not as worried about what happens to their soul beyond death, but more, what challenges they would face in relation to their personal health deterioration and self esteem. It was also observed that women seem to be more concerned with others they will be leaving behind and the loss of those around them, in many cases even moreso than themselves.

Another study which compared black and white men and women over the age of 65 found that race and sex are not the greatest determiner of death anxiety in elderly age. The age of the individuals ended up being a greater predictor of death anxiety than the other two variables previously mentioned. Age was the greatest predictor in how much death anxiety women had, but not in men. This study also found that this difference in death anxiety between sexes may be caused due to the different ways men and women communicate with other people specifically about death.

== Personal meanings of death ==
Humans develop meanings and associate them with objects and events in their environment which can provoke certain emotions. People tend to develop personal meanings of death which could be either positive or negative. If the formed meanings about death are positive, then the consequences of those meanings can be comforting (for example, ideas of a rippling effect left on those still alive). If the formed meanings about death are negative, they can cause emotional turmoil. Depending on the certain meaning one has associated with death, positive or negative, the consequences will vary accordingly. The meaning that individuals place on death is generally specific to them; whether negative or positive, and can be difficult to understand as an outside observer. However, through a phenomenological perspective, therapists can come to understand their individual perspective and assist them in framing that meaning of death in a healthy way.

== Psychological theories ==
=== Thanatophobia ===
The term thanatophobia stems from Thanatos, the personification of death in Greek mythology. Sigmund Freud hypothesized that people express a fear of death as a disguise for a deeper source of concern. He asserted the unconscious does not deal with the passage of time or with negations, which do not calculate the amount of time left in one's life. Under the assumption that people do not believe in their own deaths, Freud speculated it was not death people feared. He postulated one does not fear death itself, because one has never died. He suspected death-related fears stem from unresolved childhood conflicts.

Thanatophobia is not only death anxiety but can mean intense fear and feelings of overall dread in relation to one's thinking about death. Usually it relates to one's personal death, especially those with terminal illnesses who have the right to demand a humane treatment for themselves. Death anxiety can mean fear of death, fear of dying, fear of being alone, fear of the dying process, etc. Different people experience these fears in differing ways. There continues to be confusion on whether death anxiety is a fear of death itself or a fear of the process of dying.

Those who are moving towards death will undergo a series of stages. In the book On Death and Dying by Elisabeth Kübler-Ross, she describes these stages thus: 1) denial that death is soon to come, 2) resentful feelings towards those who will yet live, 3) bargaining with the idea of dying, 4) feeling depressed due to inescapable death, and 5) acceptance.

=== Wisdom: ego integrity vs. despair ===
Developmental psychologist Erik Erikson formulated the psychosocial theory that people progress through a series of crises as they grow older. Erikson's theory also proposes the concept that once an individual reaches the last stages of life, they reach the level he called "ego integrity". Ego integrity is marked by one coming to terms with both one's life and inevitable death and accepting it. It was also suggested that when a person reaches the stage of late adulthood, they become involved in a thorough overview of their life to date. When one can find meaning or purpose in one's life, one has reached the integrity stage. Conversely, when an individual views their life as a series of failed and missed opportunities, they do not reach the ego integrity stage. They instead experience despair; this variation of the stage is marked by feelings of disdain and unfulfillment. People who have attained the stage of ego integrity rather than despair are believed to exhibit less death anxiety.

In a study performed in 2020, researchers tested to see if psychological need-based experiences affect their death attitudes and to see if ego integrity and despair greatly play a role in these death attitudes. The need-based experiences in this research study are the feelings of autonomy, relatedness, and competence. The researchers found that if the participants' needs were satisfied, they would have higher ego integrity in relation to their attitude towards death. This allowed the participants to have an easier time accepting death. If the participants struggled to have their needs met, then they would experience higher despair in relation to death anxiety. This meant that they had more death anxiety overall.

=== Meaning-management theory ===
Paul T. P. Wong's work on the meaning-management theory (MMT) indicates that human reactions to death are complex, multifaceted and dynamic. His "Death Attitude Profile" identifies three types of death acceptance as Neutral, Approach, and Escape acceptances. Apart from acceptances, his work also represents different aspects of the meaning of death-fear that are rooted in the bases of death anxiety. The ten meanings he proposes are finality, uncertainty, annihilation, ultimate loss, life-flow disruption, leaving loved ones, pain and loneliness, prematurity and violence of death, failure of life-work completion, judgment- and retribution-centered.

The psychological theory can also be seen by peoples' need for survival as human beings. There are several meaning-related MMT propositions that can see how we try to meet our basic needs for survival and happiness.

1. Humans are bio-psychosocial-spiritual beings. People are programmed to want connection and seek transcendence. The significant impact of one's psychological mindset impacts how one makes coping mechanisms for stress, emotions, individual personality, and cognitive processes. When a person has spiritual beliefs and values, their beliefs can help protect and facilitate against the fear and anxiety of death to lead to acceptance of death – potentially contrasting someone who does not have any holistic or religious beliefs.
2. Human beings are meaning-seeking and meaning-making creatures. We live in a social world in which we construct meaning and purpose in our lives. Our progress and happiness largely depend on humans asking questions, thinking, imagining, telling stories, and using symbols to communicate ideas and experiences with others. When we are actively engaging in the world and gaining life experiences, that can help us create unity and coherence in our life. MMT theorizes that the having the sense of belonging, purpose, and meaning can protect against the anxiety of death and can help us create feelings of personal internal control and self-independence.
3. Humans have two primary motivations: (a) to survive and (b) to find the meaning and reason for survival. The natural instinct for survival is instilled in every human being for fear of extinction. MMT postulates that when a person is given the ultimatum to live a life of suffering and turmoil, a person will get the internal self-initiative to seek for reasons to live in spite pain and suffering. Irvin D. Yalom suggests that the ability to embrace uncertainty is foundational but to posit knowledge is superior to ignorance. Navigating the complexities of life involves acknowledging the importance of embracing uncertainty and recognizing the value of informed understanding.
4. Meaning can be found in all solutions. The growth and self-change that a person is capable of in spite of life turmoil and challenges helps people transform allowing self-transcendence and the ability to choose one's destiny. By viewing guilt as an opportunity for personal growth, and perceiving life transitions as a chance to take responsible action, one can navigate challenges with a positive and constructive mindset. MMT predicts that when experiencing happiness and hope, even when faced with suffering and death, one is able to use the joy they feel to overcome and coexist with the fears of death.
5. The motivational tendencies of avoidance and approach may complement each other. Several motivation theories suggest that people's behavior is influenced by two distinct systems: approach system and avoidance system. The approach system guides behavior towards potential rewards, while the avoidance system regulates behavior to steer away from potential threats or punishments. People leaning toward an approach orientation tend to be more responsive to signals of potential rewards, whereas those favoring an avoidance orientation are typically more attuned to cues suggesting possible threats and punishments. For example, when working towards and trying to achieve a goal the fear of failing can help push the desire to succeed even harder or can lead one to failure - depending on the mindset of the individual. MMT predicts that the increased motivation to live and die well is coupled with one avoiding death while creating goals to have a happy, healthy life.

== Philosophical theories ==
=== Heidegger's being-for-death ===
The German philosopher Martin Heidegger wrote about death as something conclusively determined, in the sense that it is inevitable for every human being, while on the other hand, it unmasks its indeterminate nature via the truth that one never knows when or how death is going to come. Heidegger does not engage in speculation about whether being after death is possible. He argues that all human existence is embedded in time: past, present, future, and when considering the future, we encounter the notion of death. This then creates angst. Angst can create a clear understanding in one that death is a possible mode of existence, which Heidegger described as "clearing". Thus, angst can lead to a freedom about existence, but only if people can stop denying their mortality (as expressed in Heidegger's terminology as "stop denying being-for-death").

The American philosopher Sidney Hook criticized Heidegger's view of death anxiety in his review of Heidegger's book Being and Time when it was translated into English in 1962. Hook noted that for Heidegger, death anxiety "is a primordial anxiety, not something that waxes and wanes with changes in nature, history or society", and the anxiety is about "the possibility that one's existence may at any moment become finally impossible". Hook argued that Heidegger's claims were wrong:

Now even when we become aware of this possibility, there is no evidence that we normally become anxious about it, unless the possibility is concretized and seems probable. Nor does Heidegger advance any reasons why we should be anxious. After all, because we cannot imagine ourselves dead, this hardly justifies the inference that our existence is necessary. What we know about human attitudes towards death indicates that Heidegger's generalization is false. Some men, and not only figures like Socrates and Spinoza, have no anxiety in the face of death. Men have believed that there are many things which could happen to them that are far worse than death. Any sensitive person can think of a variety of circumstances that would make death a happy release, almost a privilege.

=== Existential theories ===
The existential approach, with theorists such as Rollo May and Viktor Frankl, views an individual's personality as being governed by continuous choices and decisions in relation to the realities of life and death. Rollo May theorized that all humans are aware of the fact that they must one day die, reminiscent of the Latin adage memento mori. However, he also theorized that humans must find meaning in life, which led to his main theory on death anxiety: that all humans face the dichotomy of finding meaning in life, but also confronting the knowledge of approaching death. Many believed that this dichotomy could lead to negative anxiety that hindered life, or a positive anxiety that would lead to a life full of meaning and living to one's fullest potential and opportunities.

== Other theories ==
Other theories on death anxiety were introduced in the late part of the twentieth century. Another approach is the regret theory which was introduced by Adrian Tomer and Grafton Eliason. The main focus of the theory is to target the way people evaluate the quality and/or worth of their lives. The possibility of death usually makes people more anxious if they feel that they have not and cannot accomplish any positive task in the life that they are living. Research has tried to unveil the factors that might influence the amount of anxiety people experience in life.

== Death anxiety and culture ==
Individual opinions, experiences, and emotions to death anxiety are significantly influenced by cultural backgrounds. Beliefs around morality are shaped from cultural, religious, and social traditions; this can effect how people view death and react to assessments that measure death anxiety. For example, some Eastern cultures view death as a natural part of the life cycle. In contrast, many Western cultures tend to fear or avoid it. Many Indigenous cultures view death as a continuation of life and as a transition into another broader form of existence, and some Eastern and South Asian cultures view death in terms of reincarnation or as part of a larger cosmic cycle. On the other hand, Western cultures that have been influenced by Christian beliefs, often view death as a final transition that marks the beginning of an afterlife. Since cultural beliefs influence how one perceives death, it is crucial to recognize that death anxiety may manifest in different ways depending on an individual's cultural and religious background. These cultural perspectives also extend to health and illness contexts, where research has been conducted to investigate the association of death anxiety and cultural orientation in individuals living with serious diseases such as cancer. A meta-analysis of cancer survivors found that cultural orientation moderates the experience of death anxiety, where the association between death anxiety and depression was stronger in collectivist than in individualistic cultures. In addition, the mean levels of death anxiety varied depending on the outcome measure that was used. These findings suggest that individuals across different cultural contexts focus on different aspects of mortality, reflecting the way in which attitudes toward death and dying are shaped by societal values. The findings highlight that cultural norms become especially relevant in how mortality is cognitively and emotionally processed by cancer survivors, which calls for culturally responsive psychosocial support. Overall, these elements highlight the need for more culturally sensitive approaches to understanding, measuring, and treating death anxiety.

== Religiosity and death anxiety ==
A 2012 study involving Christian and Muslim college-students from the US, Turkey, and Malaysia found that their religiosity correlated positively with an increased fear of death.

In 2017, a literature review found that in the United States, both the very religious and the not-at-all religious enjoy a lower level of death anxiety and that a reduction is common with old age.

In 2019, a study further examined the aspect of religiosity and how it relates to death and existential anxiety through the application of supernatural agency. According to this particular study, existential anxiety relates to death anxiety through a mild level of preoccupation that is experienced concerning the impact of one's own life or existence in relation to its unforeseen end. It is mentioned how supernatural agency exists independently on a different dimensional plane than the individual and, as a result, is seen as something that cannot be directly controlled. Oftentimes, supernatural agency is equated with the desires of a higher power such as God or other major cosmic forces. The inability for one to control supernatural agency triggers various psychological aspects that induce intense periods of experienced death or existential anxiety. One of the psychological effects of supernatural agency that is triggered is an increased likelihood to attribute supernatural agency toward causality when dealing with natural phenomena. Seeing how people have their own innate form of agency, the attribution of supernatural agency to human actions and decisions can be difficult. However, when it comes to natural causes and consequences where no other form of agency exists, it becomes much easier to make a supernatural attribution of causality.

A study conducted among pilgrims at the Ardh Kumbh Mela in India discovered a link between strong religious beliefs, particularly in reincarnation, and reduced death anxiety among elderly Hindus. The research found that while certain religious practices, like the Ganga snan (ritualistic bathing in the river Ganges), did not significantly affect death anxiety, a firm belief in life after death and finding meaning in life did.

=== Terror management theory and religion ===
Ernest Becker based his terror management theory (TMT) on existential views that added a new dimension to previous death anxiety theories. His theory states that death anxiety is not only real, but also people's most profound source of concern. He described the anxiety as so intense that it can generate fears and phobias of everyday life like fears of being alone, or in confined spaces. According to Becker, many everyday human behaviors consist of attempts to deny death and to keep anxiety under strict regulation.

His theory suggests that as an individual develops mortality salience, or becomes more aware of the inevitability of death, they will instinctively try to suppress this thought out of fear. This behavior may range from simply thinking about death to the development of severe phobias and desperate behavior. According to terror management theory, this heightened awareness of mortality can lead individuals to cling more strongly to their cultural worldviews and self-esteem as a way to defend against existential anxiety, helping them maintain their sense of meaning and value. However, studies have also found that maladaptive behaviors resulting from TMT may also be connected to other mental health conditions. Disorders such as panic disorder, obsessive-compulsive disorder, and post traumatic-stress disorder also may contribute to feelings of death anxiety.

Religiosity can play a role in death anxiety through the concept of fear. There are two major claims concerning the interplay of fear and religion: that fear motivates religious belief, and that religious belief mitigates fear. From these, Ernest Becker developed what is called "terror management theory". According to terror management theory, humans are aware of their own mortality which, in turn, produces intense existential anxiety. To cope with and ease the produced existential anxiety, humans will pursue either literal or symbolic immortality. Religion often falls under the category of literal immortality, but at times, depending on the religion, can also provide both forms of immortality. It is theorised that those who are either very low or very high in religiosity experience much lower levels of death anxiety, whereas those with a very moderate amount of religiosity experience the highest levels of death anxiety. One of the major reasons that religiosity plays such a large role in terror management theory, as well as in similar theories, is the increase in existential death anxiety that people experience. Existential death anxiety is the belief that everything ceases after death; nothing continues on in any sense. Seeing how people deeply fear such an absolute elimination of the self, they begin to gravitate toward religion which offers an escape from such a fate. In one specific meta-analysis study that was performed in 2016, it was shown that lower rates of death anxiety and general fear about dying were experienced by those who went day-to-day living their religion and abiding by its practices, compared to those who merely label themselves as members of a given religion, without living according to its doctrines and prescribed practices.

A 2009 study with 135 participants on death anxiety in the context of religion showed that Christians scored lower for death anxiety than non-religious individuals, which supports the main tenets of terror management theory, that people pursue religion to avoid anxiety about death by finding comfort in the ideas about afterlife and immortality. Interestingly, the study also found that Muslims scored much higher than Christians and non-religious individuals for death anxiety. This finding is however not significant, because only 18 of the participants identified as Muslim. These findings do not support terror management theory, as the belief in an afterlife caused more anxiety for the Muslim participants than those with no belief in an afterlife. There is a need for further examination into TMT in the context of different religions/sects as well as the impact of varying beliefs about the afterlife on levels of death anxiety.

== Health and death anxiety ==
=== Death acceptance and death anxiety ===
Researchers have also conducted surveys on how being able to accept one's inevitable death could have a positive effect on one's psychological well-being, or on one's level of individual distress. A research study conducted in 1974 attempted to set up a new type of scale to measure people's death acceptance, rather than their death anxiety. After administering a questionnaire with questions regarding the acceptance of death, the researchers found there was a low-negative correlation between acceptance of one's own death and anxiety about death; meaning that the more the participants accepted their own death, the less anxiety they felt. While those who accept the fact of their own death will still feel some anxiety about it, this acceptance could allow them to form a more positive perspective on it.

People who are exposed to those who are near death or who have already died seem to have a paradigm shift in their way of thinking about death.

A more recent longitudinal study asked cancer patients at different stages to fill out different questionnaires in order to rate their levels of death acceptance, general anxiety, demoralization, etc. The same surveys administered to the same people one year later showed that higher levels of death acceptance could predict lower levels of death anxiety in the participants.

=== Death anxiety in palliative and end-of-life care ===
For patients undergoing palliative or end-of-life care, death anxiety is a major concern. Patients managing advanced disease often experience some sort of fear related to physical decline, loss of independence, and uncertainty about the dying process. Higher levels of death anxiety have been linked to symptom burden, psychological distress, and interruptions in the patients day-to-day functioning.

Sociodemographic and psychosocial factors also play a role. Women, younger adults, and individuals with limited social support have been found to report higher levels of death anxiety. In patients who are receiving palliative care, psychological distress, such as depression, hopelessness, and fear of recurrence, has been found to be a strong predictor of heightened death anxiety.

Higher levels of meaning in life, spiritual well-being, and social support from family or care teams are associated with lower levels of death anxiety. Studies report that patients draw emotional strength from their relationships with loved ones, which can help them face end-of-life concerns despite the distress of declining health.

Research in palliative care emphasizes that death anxiety is not only related to fear of dying but also to broader existential themes in ones life. Patients often describe concerns about their dignity, identity, and the meaning of their lives as the illness progresses. Clinical models emphasize how important it truly is to address these issues as soon as possible because unresolved existential discomfort may intensify psychological suffering in the final stages of life.

=== Death anxiety experienced by cancer patients ===
Research concerning death anxiety in cancer patients has grown in the past three decades. Death anxiety can be a common experience for those diagnosed with cancer, and has been found to coincide with feelings of depression. Other feelings found to be associated with death anxiety were a loss of meaning, helplessness, and a sense of failure. It has been found to be a significant concern for end-of-life stage cancer patients, as lower quality of life (symptom burden, palliative care, etc.) was linked to higher levels of death anxiety.

For cancer patients and survivors, fear that disease will progress or return has been identified as a source of high psychological distress. Research shows that patients describe these fears to be significant as well as inadequately addressed by physicians. Greater fears of recurrence have been linked to reduced quality of life and psychological well-being. It has also been noted to increase a multitude of symptoms, including but not limited to, depression, anxiety, avoidance, and fatigue. A systematic review conducted in 2025 reported a large correlation between death anxiety and fears of illness progression or recurrence, with the relationship evident across chronic illness groups, yet appearing stronger in populations with cancer. The same review also reported death anxiety having similar relationships to both fear of recurrence and fear of progression, suggesting that patient concerns about disease development may be connected to concerns about mortality.

Attitudes towards life and death have been shown to impact cancer patient's understanding of death anxiety. For example, higher spiritual well-being has been found to help reduce death anxiety. Research has found five key themes surrounding perceptions of life and death in cancer patients: despair, making sense of death, how to live the rest of life, special feelings for loved ones, and fluctuation. These themes impact how these patients grapple with death on their own terms. The first theme, despair, concerned the patient's fear of death. For making sense of death, this involved the various interpretations patients had for death such as death as liberation or their own responsibility. The third theme on how to live coincided with what it means to the patient to have a dignified death. Special feelings for loved ones involved patient reports that they were questioning their worth to their families. The last theme, fluctuation, was found in patient reports that they felt contradictory feelings about their life and potential death.

Studies have found that end-of-life stage cancer patients highly valued their dignity in relation to both life and death. However, many patients also expressed that they worried that they were a burden to their families. These patients consider a dignified death to be one that allows them full autonomy (if possible) and respect. Cancer patients in Eastern and Western countries both saw their ability to give something of importance to others as an essential part of living a dignified life.

=== Death anxiety and mental illness symptoms ===
Death anxiety has been linked to the severity of various mental health issues, such as OCD, depression, panic disorder and generalized anxiety. It is a trans-diagnostic factor, meaning it exists within numerous mental health conditions, and often acts as a fundamental fear underlying many mental health issues.

Death anxiety has been correlated with anxiety disorders, specifically through mortality salience. Mortality salience is the awareness of one's death being inevitable, and it has been found to have an effect on anxiety levels, which suggests that an individual's anxiety may increase when they are reminded of their mortality. Reminders of death have also been found to have a medium to large effect on anxiety levels, revealing how death anxiety may play a role in intensifying existing anxiety symptoms, and developing new ones as well. Further, individuals with panic disorder have been shown to exhibit higher death anxiety compared to those with depression or other anxiety disorders, because it can be particularly pronounced during panic attacks.

Death anxiety has also been researched within the context of suicidality. Individuals with high death anxiety have been found to fear death while also engaging in suicidal behavior, which has been described as a paradoxical effect. This effect has been linked to a lower suicide intent when death anxiety is high.

These findings highlight the need for specialized fields such as psycho-oncology, in order to understand how death anxiety should be treated in association with distress and symptoms alongside other mental illnesses and medical issues. This way, a more comprehensive approach can be offered so that individuals struggling with death anxiety can receive care that addresses the full scope of their psychological health concerns.

=== Death anxiety amongst patient caregivers ===
In the past couple decades there has been an increase in patients with chronic illnesses. Home care, as opposed to hospital or institutional care, has been favored by those with chronic illnesses as it has been seen to be more cost-effective. Those who may be experiencing physical or mental deterioration from their illnesses depend highly on caregiving assistance. Caregivers share an intimate space with the patient; experiencing the pain and decline of a patient's health alongside them. They also may not have had a choice in their caregiving status, as family and friends are often positioned to give informal care. Caregivers have also historically dealt with significant financial, physical, and emotional burdens, which can exacerbate their fears of death and dying. Death anxiety within caregivers in the case of chronic illnesses (such as cancer or Alzheimer's) is also more common for caregivers as they face possibilities such as witnessing the death of a loved one. While depression and anxiety levels have been reported to be high amongst these individuals, social support has also been found to play a significant role in relieving death anxiety feelings overall.

=== Death anxiety and COVID-19 ===
Millions of people around the world have died from COVID-19 during the COVID-19 pandemic. The pandemic presents a psychological stressor for pre-existent death anxiety fears. COVID-19 death anxiety was found to influence people's judgement throughout their lives. In an Australian study, those who fear that they are more prone to contracting and dying from COVID-19 have higher levels of death anxiety. The study finds a positive correlation with death anxiety and general psychological disturbances such as depression, anxiety, stress, and paranoia. Participants were also found to have greater fears of death from COVID-19 (average 22%) than the Australian fatality case rate (2%). Elderly individuals, who were already likely to experience death anxiety outside of a pandemic situation, now find their fear of death largely exacerbated. The fear of dying from COVID-19 has also been one of the leading factors in psychological distress among many countries during the course of the pandemic. It has particularly affected women and those with a lower level of education. During the COVID-19 pandemic, death anxiety has been a large contributor to declining mental wellbeing among those working in helping professions such as nursing and social work.

== Interventions and death education ==
Psychological and educational interventions to reduce death anxiety have also become more common in cancer patients. Recent meta-analyses have reported that structured death education programs are associated with significant decreases in death anxiety and depressive symptoms, along with improving overall quality of life in patients with advanced cancer. These programs frequently include discussions of mortality, emotional expression, and the meaning of death that helps patients approach end of life issues with greater acceptance and less fear. Evidence supports psychosocial and cognitive behavioral interventions to alleviate fear of death and promote emotional adjustment. Rational-emotive hospice care therapy is another effective psychological treatment for reducing death anxiety, which works by helping patients change distressing cognitions and reinforcing positive self-beliefs. Death education and psychological treatments can enhance quality of life indicators such as emotional well being and spiritual health. These findings suggest that education about death education should be part of palliative care, in which talking about dying is often taboo and considered a source of discomfort. Overall, educational and therapeutic interventions that promote death acceptance have been shown to reduce death anxiety and improve experiences at the end of life in cancer care.

== Treatment ==
Death anxiety can be treated through a variety of approaches that consider psychological and cultural factors. Cognitive behavioral therapy (CBT), for example, is used to help people challenge irrational fears about death while reducing avoidant behaviors, allowing them to reframe their thinking and reduce anxiety. Meaning-centered therapies are another treatment option, as they assist individuals in finding purpose and meaning in their lives, which can lessen existential fears related to death. Mindfulness-based approaches can also help individuals accept their mortality, by focusing on living in the present moment. Depending on the person's spiritual beliefs, existential or spiritual approaches may also offer comfort by exploring their views on death and the afterlife.

Research has shown that supportive interventions often target existential distress in patients with advanced illness. A systematic review found that therapies focusing on dignity, identity, and meaning were rather effective in reducing death-related distress and improving overall emotional well-being in palliative care populations. Meaning-based psychotherapies have also been shown to significantly reduce death anxiety by strengthening a sense of purpose and supporting emotional regulation.

In individuals with advanced cancer in which there is often no curable medical treatment, care for death anxiety also involves a combination of therapeutic approaches in order to address both the psychological and existential distress associated with dying. For instance, dignity therapy focuses on helping terminally ill patients find a sense of purpose and meaning in their lives, by enhancing their sense of self-worth and dignity as they approach the end of life. This intervention can alleviate existential suffering by allowing patients to reflect on their lives, highlight their important memories, tell life stories to their loved ones. Meaning-Centered Group Psychotherapy is another treatment option for terminally ill patients, and it focuses on spiritually searching for meaning within death. Additionally, Cancer and Living Meaningfully psychotherapy, a brief and individualized intervention, allows patients to feel a sense of control over the idea of death which can reduce distress. All of these interventions offer ways to help patients with terminal illnesses come to terms with the complex idea of death, and find peace as they near the end of life. Patients' cultures should also be taken into account when being treated, as their death anxiety type may vary based on their cultural background.

== Death row phenomenon ==
The death row phenomenon is the distress and anxiety seen in inmates awaiting execution, which can cause an increased risk for suicidal tendencies and psychotic delusions. A contributing factor to this phenomenon is solitary confinement, lack of social interaction, as well as the psychological impact as a result of their crimes. One study collected data on death row suicides from 1978 to 2010 and found the rate of death row suicides to be higher than suicides in the male prison population as well as males in society, regardless of the increase in supervision of death row inmates.

In a review of international law, there have been arguments made that support the idea of death row being a violation of human rights. In the past, executions have occurred hours or days after a sentence to death was received. However, in the United States, it can take up to, or more than, 10 years for a prisoner to see their day of execution. This time is spent in an area of a prison known as death row, where inmates are typically in their cells for up to 23 hours each day and have limited interaction with others. This, combined with the extensive time they wait for their day of execution, might correlate with the symptoms of psychological and physical deterioration increasing among those imprisoned on death row.

== Relationship to adult attachment ==
Death anxiety refers to the fear of death and the unknown that comes with it. Adult attachment, on the other hand, refers to the emotional bond between two individuals, often romantic partners, that provides a sense of security and comfort. Research has shown that there is a complex relationship between death anxiety and adult attachment.

According to the attachment theory, people exhibit different attachment patterns. Several studies have found that individuals who are more anxious about death tend to have less secure attachment styles. Insecure attachment styles are characterized by a fear of abandonment and a lack of trust in others, which can make it difficult for individuals to form close, supportive relationships. These individuals may also have difficulty coping with the idea of death, as they may feel a lack of support and security in their relationships.

On the other hand, individuals who have more secure attachment styles tend to have lower levels of death anxiety. This may be because they feel more supported and connected to others, which can provide a sense of comfort and security when dealing with the idea of death.

There is evidence that suggests increasing one's social curiosity, which plays a role in interpersonal relations, can reduce and subdue death anxiety. In the context of particular study, social curiosity and its tendency to foster social connection and relatedness with others acts as a form of symbolic immortality. Symbolic immortality is a conceptual model that can help reduce the fear of death.

=== Children ===
Death anxiety typically begins in childhood. The earliest documentation of the fear of death has been found in children as young as age 5. Psychological measures and reaction times were used to measure fear of death in young children. Recent studies that assess fear of death in children use questionnaire rating scales. There are many tests to study this including The Death Anxiety Scale for Children (DASC) developed by Schell and Seefeldt. However the most common version of this test is the revised Fear Survey Schedule for Children (FSSC-R). The FSSC-R describes specific fearful stimuli and children are asked to rate the degree to which the scenario/item makes them anxious or fearful. The most recent version of the FSSC-R presents the scenarios in a pictorial form to children as young as 4. It is called the Koala Fear Questionnaire (KFQ). The fear studies show that children's fears can be grouped into five categories. One of these categories is death and danger. This response was found amongst children age 4 to 6 on the KFQ, and from age 7 to 10. Death is the most commonly feared item and remains the most commonly feared item throughout adolescence.

A study of 90 children, aged 4–8, done by Virginia Slaughter and Maya Griffiths showed that a more mature understanding of the biological concept of death was correlated to a decreased fear of death. This may suggest that it is helpful to teach children about death (in a biological sense), in order to alleviate the fear.

== See also ==
- Human condition
- Melancholia
- Memento mori
- Mortality salience
- Psychological impact of terminal illness
- The Denial of Death

== Bibliography ==
- Craddock, Nick; Mynors-Wallis, Laurence (2014). "Psychiatric diagnosis: Impersonal, imperfect and important". British Journal of Psychiatry. 204 (2): 93–95. doi:10.1192/bjp.bp.113.133090. PMID 24493652.
