= Chamber of Reflection =

Initiation room in Freemasonry

Within the context of Freemasonry, the Chamber of Reflection, often abbreviated as C.O.R., and alternatively known as the Room of Reflection, Reflection Cabinet, or Meditation Cabinet, plays a pivotal role in the initiation process (in some countries and jurisdictions). This chamber serves as a dedicated space where a critical component of the initiation ritual unfolds, prompting the candidate to undergo a period of isolation designed to foster introspection and self-examination. The experience within the Chamber of Reflection is enriched by the presence of symbolic objects and thought-provoking phrases, which may exhibit minor variations across different Masonic rites and traditions.

The isolation period within the Chamber of Reflection represents the initial phase of the broader initiation ritual, marking the commencement of the candidate's journey as they embark upon their Masonic course. This secluded environment serves as a platform for individuals entering Freemasonry to engage in a deeply contemplative process, setting the stage for their spiritual and intellectual development within the Masonic fraternity.

== Origins in Freemasonry ==
The precise origins of the Chamber of Reflection within Freemasonry remain shrouded in obscurity, primarily owing to the secretive character of the order. Consequently, discerning the exact inception of this ritualistic practice poses a formidable challenge to historians and scholars specializing in Masonic studies. Nonetheless, an array of corroborative evidence suggests a strong and ancient lineage, traceable to first written exposés that described the actual ceremony, and not just the catechism. Historical documentation reveals instances of a "Dark room," also referred to as a "Black room" or "Meditation room," employed in the early phases of speculative masonry. These practices antedate the initiation of new candidates, one of the oldest Masonic exposé, "Reception D'un Frey-Maçon, 1737" mentions:

"the recipient is led by the Proposer, who becomes his Godfather, into one of the Lodge's rooms, where there is no light, & where he is asked if he has the vocation to be received."

This practice is also exemplified in the exposé "Le secret des francs-maçons" (1742):

"The reception room must be composed of several rooms, in one of which there should be no light. It is in this one that the godfather first leads the recipient [...] Then, a blindfold is placed over their eyes, and they are left to their thoughts for about an hour."

The renowned Jachin and Boaz exposé of 1762 states:

"[...]he orders the Wardens to go out and prepare the person, who is generally waiting in a room at some distance from the Lodge room by himself, being left there by his friend who proposed him. He is conducted into another room, which is totally dark [...]"

Furthermore, "Solomon in all his glory; or, the Master-Mason of 1766" explicitly describes:

"It was a dark place with the windows shut, and curtains drawn. This, said he, we call the black room: it is still in your power to go through with the ceremony, or to relinquish it; I leave you to your own reflections. After uttering these words he remained silent, [...]"

=== Origins of the name ===
The room was commonly referred to as the black room or dark room until around 1740–1750. The early Louisiana Ritual "Bonseigneur", which dates between 1740 and 1750, mentions:

"…Brother Tyler, who will rather abruptly guide him to the dark chamber (also known as the Chamber of reflection)…"

This suggests a change in the terminology used for the place.

== The Chamber of Reflection per country ==
=== The Chamber of Reflection in the United States ===
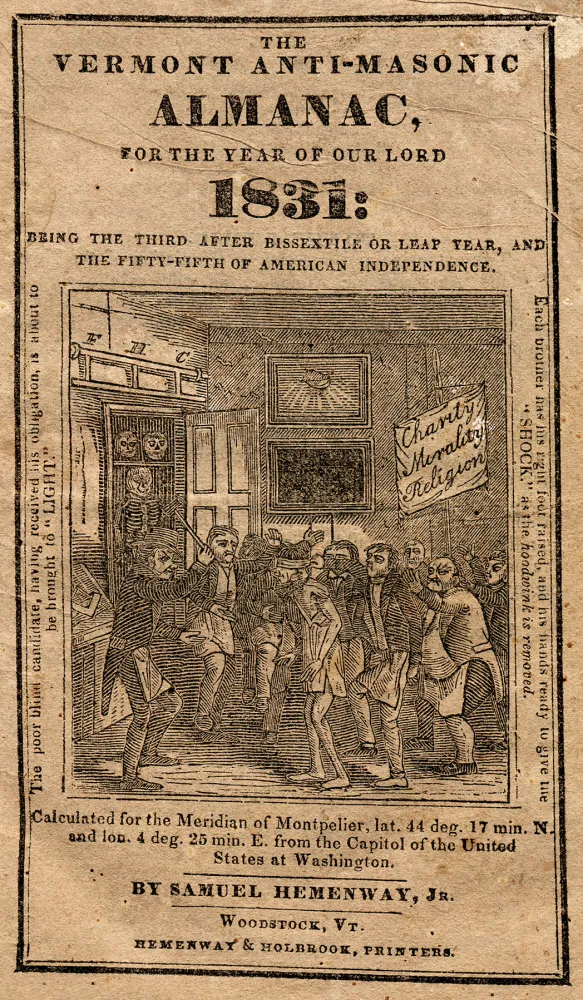
The cover of Samuel Hemenway Jr's "The Vermont Anti-Masonic Almanac for the Hemenway and Holbrook 1830, depicts the initiation of a candidate with a depiction of an early American Chamber of reflection in the back.

The Chamber of Reflection had been used by some American Lodges from the earliest times of the new country, and is even mentioned in the famous Jachin and Boaz exposé of 1762 (this exposé is known to have greatly influenced American Freemasonry); it was wildly incorporated into American Masonic rituals and Lodges by the early 19th century then fell out of widespread use after the anti-Masonic movement following the Morgan affair of 1826. In recent decades, many American Grand Lodges as well as individual Lodges have revived the tradition of the Chamber of Reflection.

==== Early use in the United States ====
By the late 1700s to early 1800s, the Chamber of Reflection had been incorporated into most Masonic rituals in the United States. It was such a popular practice that it got incorporated into the Grand Encampment of New York by 1814 and the General Grand Encampment by 1816. Some American Masons even had small Chambers of Reflection in their homes for private meditation. It was also common for members of a Lodge to frequently use the Chamber of Reflection, for meditation purposes outside of rituals.

==== Decline after the Morgan Affair ====
The mysterious disappearance and presumed murder of former Mason William Morgan in 1826 fueled widespread anti-Masonic sentiment in the United States. While other ritual exposures had been published previously, Morgan's planned book was seen as a betrayal at a pivotal moment in American history. The backlash led many American lodges to close as well as some Grand Lodges, and triggered changes to make Freemasonry less secretive, selective and esoteric. The more esoteric traditions like the Chamber of Reflection moved from mainstream Craft (Blue) Lodges to higher degree bodies. In Craft (Blue) Lodges, the Chamber of Reflection was often transformed into "The preparation room".

Subsequent to the Morgan Affair, Robert Benjamin Folger undertook the compilation of a volume containing encoded rituals pertaining to another Masonic Rite. This Rite, recognized as the Rectified Scottish Rite or alternately as the very "elite" masonic body known worldwide as "CBCS", short for "Chevaliers Bienfaisant de La Cite Sainte", had established a prominent presence across Europe but remained entirely unfamiliar within the United States during that era.

The utilization of the Chamber of Reflection, a symbolic chamber serving contemplative and transformative purposes, resurfaced within the United States primarily through the rituals associated with the Rectified Scottish Rite. However, it did not regain prominence within mainstream Masonic craft lodges, until the latter part of the twentieth century and its recent revival across blue Lodges. This resurgence marked a noteworthy development in the historical evolution of Masonic practices in the United States.

==== Revival in recent times ====
In the 1980s and 90s, Masonic historians such as Arturo de Hoyos explored surviving early American Chamber of Reflection rituals.

In the late 20th and early 21st centuries, interest developed in reclaiming some of the old traditions and improving the Masonic experience. A grassroot, country wide movement, has seen many North American Masonic Lodges and Grand Lodges revive or implement the old tradition of the Chamber of Reflection, seeing it for some as a way to restore historic practices, make more sense of the actual ritual, give candidates a more profound initiatory experience as well as more uniform initiatory process with the rest of the world.

However, the practice remains controversial among some American Masons. Proper protocols, meanings and intent behind the Chamber of Reflection are not widely understood and it has been observed that its restoration requires education to be implemented effectively.

In recent years many individual Lodges and Grand Lodges have been working in educating the Members about the Chamber of Reflection and is solemn, historical and reflective purpose, especially Observant Lodges.

== Description ==
Well known American Freemason Albert G. Mackey, in his 1873 book Mackey's Encyclopedia of Freemasonry, describes the Chamber of Reflection as "...a small room adjoining the Lodge, in which, preparatory to initiation, the candidate is enclosed for the purpose of indulging in those serious meditations which its sombre appearance and the gloomy emblems with which it is furnished are calculated to produce. It is also used in some of the advanced degrees for a similar purpose."

In the 1860, "Rituel de l'Apprenti Maçon" from French Freemason Jean-Marie Ragon, the Chamber of reflection is thus described; "... It is a dark place impenetrable to the rays of the day and lit by a sepulchral lamp. The walls are painted black with funerary emblems in order to bring to meditation the recipient who will have to go through the four elements of the ancients and undergo his first ordeal, that of the EARTH in which he is supposed to be to remind him of his last resting place. In the form of the skeleton that lies next to him in an open coffin symbolizing the nothingness of human vanities. If there were no skeleton, a skull and crossbones would be placed on the table. The furnishings of this room consist of a chair and a table covered with a white carpet on which are paper, ink, powder, pen and lamp. Above the table are represented a Rooster and an Hourglass, and underneath these two words, VIGILANCE (on one's actions) PERSEVERANCE (in good), the hours being counted. The inscriptions, usually placed on the walls, are these: "If curiosity leads you here, go away; if you fear to be enlightened about your faults, you will be badly off among us. If you are capable of concealment, tremble, we will penetrate you! If you are fond of human distinctions, go out, they are not known here. If your soul has felt the fear, don't go further. If you persevere you will be purified by the elements, you will come out of the abyss of darkness, you will see the light. After the patient has had time to examine and reflect, he is given a paper with three questions to answer, which may concern his profession, his position in the world, etc. Here are the ones that are most commonly used: What does the man owe to God? What does he owe to himself? What does he owe to his fellow men? They are summarized by the love of God, the love of oneself and the love of his fellow men. The preparatory brother enters and tells him that he will soon pass to a new life and he is required to make and sign his will that he will come to take as well as his answers."

Famous American Freemason Albert Pike also described the Chamber of Reflection at length, in his Scottish Rite, Secret Work for the first and third degree.

== Function and usage ==
Before the ceremony of Masonic initiation, the candidate is placed for a time in the Chamber of Reflection, in order to meditate and consider how Freemasonry is about to change his life. He is given a series of questions to answer. Typically, he is asked his duties to God, his fellow men, and himself and to write a philosophical last will. In some American Lodges, using Albert Pike's ritual, more questions are asked. At the end of this time, he is led to the Lodge room for initiation.

Nowadays, the Chamber of Reflection is used in various ways in most masonic rites, all across the world with the exception of North America where its usage is sporadic but gaining popularity.

In the modern French Rite, the place is called "Chambre de réflexions" plural. In the Emulation Lodge of Improvement, the candidate is alone in a room adjacent to the lodge called "Meditation room" or "Room of reflection." In the Ancient and Accepted Scottish Rite, it is called the Chamber of Reflection or Cabinet of Reflection. In the York Rite it is most of the time called a Chamber of Reflection. The Brazilian Rite calls it Gabinete de reflexão or cabine de reflexõesa also the Brazilian Rite differs in the way that the candidate, present, in the Chamber of Reflection also receives another piece of paper that he must read. In it are found articles I and II of the Constitution of the jurisdiction, dealing with Freemasonry and its Principles. Moreover, he must also sign a declaration.

== Symbolism ==
A number of evocative symbols and archetypal images are present in the Chamber of Reflection. They may be physically present or represented on a wall poster, painted or engraved on the walls.

In terms of symbolic origins, the French writer and philosopher Daniel Béresniak draws a parallel between the mythological Cretan labyrinth of the Minotaur built by Daedalus and the meditation room. The writer Oswald Wirth played a significant role in the understanding of Masonic symbolism and perpetuated, through several works, the idea of an alchemical origin.

=== Placement ===
The Chamber of Reflection should ideally be situated beneath the Lodge room, featuring a natural dirt floor and walls adorned in either black paint or constructed with rock surfaces to emulate a cave-like ambiance. It is important for the recipient or person being taken to the chamber to go down a flight of stairs (or a ladder) to represent going down to the center of the Earth.

=== The human skull or full skeleton ===
Early Lodges insisted on using a full human skeleton but today most Lodges used a skull and crossbones; it is meant to evoke physical death. In Baroque painting, the still life associated with the presence of a skull was used to illustrate vanity (a defect of a person who thinks too highly of himself). The skull thus acted as a reminder of the fatality of death and as a call to humility. In European and Asian legends, the human skull is a counterpart to the vault of heaven.

=== Mirror ===
In some rites a mirror may be placed on the table of the reflection cabinet; it is meant to signify the search for self-knowledge as well as introspection but also acts as a reminder to the candidate that he is his own judge. In ancient times, the mirror (speculum) was used to observe the sky.

=== Hourglass ===
The hourglass symbolizes time. Inducing the sense of the passage of time, the hourglass recalls an essential reality: the limited duration of earthly existence. The hourglass is thus associated with the immutable cycles of birth and death and with the notions of aging, fatality and irreversibility. The two parts of the hourglass can be likened to heaven and earth.

=== Scythe ===
Representation of the Reaper as one of the allegories of death.

Agricultural instrument and symbol of Death, sometimes drawn behind the hourglass in the chamber of reflection, the scythe intersects with the parable of the harvest and evokes the grain that dies to give life. In ancient mythology, it is Cronos who is represented holding the scythe and the hourglass. In the Middle Ages, during the ravages of the Black Death, an anthropomorphized representation of death appeared, named "The Grim Reaper". The Grim Reaper was said to kill the sick with a blow from a scythe, regardless of their class. Saturn, the ancient Roman god of agriculture and time, armed with a scythe, takes from one side (time, death, epidemics...) and gives back from the other (harvest, summer, abundance) without distinction. The scythe could therefore include a notion of equality.

=== Rooster ===
The rooster is identified with the Sun in the mythologies of India and the Native American Pueblo tribes. In Zoroastrian beliefs, it is the symbol of protection of good from evil. Ancient beliefs report that evil spirits, active at night, were driven away by the crowing of the rooster before dawn: "The dawn bird crows all night; and then, it is said, no spirit dares venture out." (Hamlet, Act I, sc.1).

Two words are also commonly added to the rooster: "PERSEVERANCE,VIGILANCE"

Today in Free-masonry, in the context of the chamber of reflection the Rooster is known as; "the only animal, brave enough to step into the dark and call for the day to come, it is a message of encouragement to the candidate."

=== Bread ===
Associated with wheat, bread evokes life and combined with leaven it symbolizes the spiritual transformation of the recipient. It can also be associated with sorrow and work, as evoked in the Book of Genesis (III-19): "By the sweat of your brow you shall eat bread until you return to the ground, for from it you were taken." This passage can be linked to the first phase of initiation, the symbolic death, the return to the ground. Bread also includes the four basic elements of alchemy: earth (flour and oven), water (liquid), air (fermentation of leaven) and fire (cooking).

=== Water ===
Water is the element without which life is not possible, and is the symbol of all sources of life for the Egyptians. Its presence in Greek-Roman mythology is well known: the Styx, a river whose icy waters symbolize the passage from life to death with its disturbing ferryman Caron. In the Judeo-Christian tradition, water symbolizes purification and renewal.

=== The Candle ===
The Chamber of Reflection's candle symbolizes light, knowledge of oneself and things. In this dark room, the light from the candle will gradually take up more and more space in contrast to the prevailing darkness. It represents the quest for being and the path to oneself. This is why it is crucial that only one source of light be used.

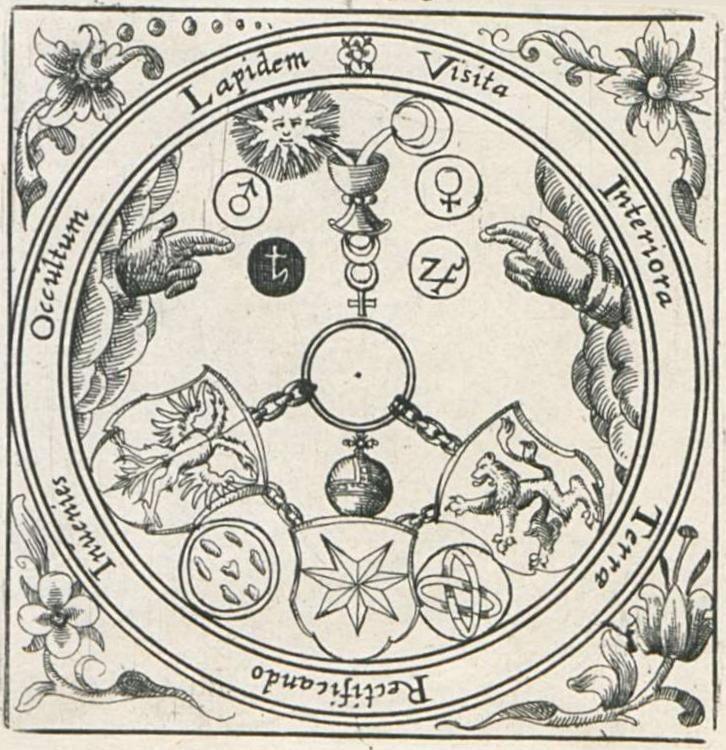
Alchemical representation by Stolz von Stolzenberg in 1624

=== The Phrases and inscriptions ===
Multiple phrases are inscribed onto the walls of the Chamber of Reflection, and they have multiple purposes, some of them discourage the profane from joining freemasonry for a dishonest purpose, some of them warn the profane that his journey will be difficult, other phrases tell the profane that he has nothing to fear if he trusts his future brothers and is a good person.

==== Main phrase ====
V∴I∴T∴R∴I∴O∴L∴ or V∴I∴T∴R∴I∴O∴L∴U∴M∴

1. Meaning;("visita interiora terrae, rectificandoque, invenies occultum lapidem", or "visit the interior of the earth, and purifying it, you will find the hidden stone." This is another way of saying " look within yourself for the truth".) This phrase must be present in all chambers of reflection directly facing the candidate.

==== Other commonly used Phrases ====
- If curiosity has led you here, go away!
- If your soul is in dread, go no further.
- If you care about human distinctions, Get out. We do not know of any. (Meaning there are no Titles in the Lodge ex. a Lord is not above a commoner, all are equals in Freemasonry).
- Know thyself, If you lie, you will be exposed.
- To make better use of your life, think about your incoming death.
- If you persevere, you will be purified by the elements; you will come out of the abyss of darkness and you will see the light.
- VA-T’EN (Ancient French phrase meaning Go Away),(Bellow the Rooster)
- VIGILANCE – PERSEVERANCE.

== See also ==
- Observant Freemasonry
