= Necrophobia =

Fear of dead organisms

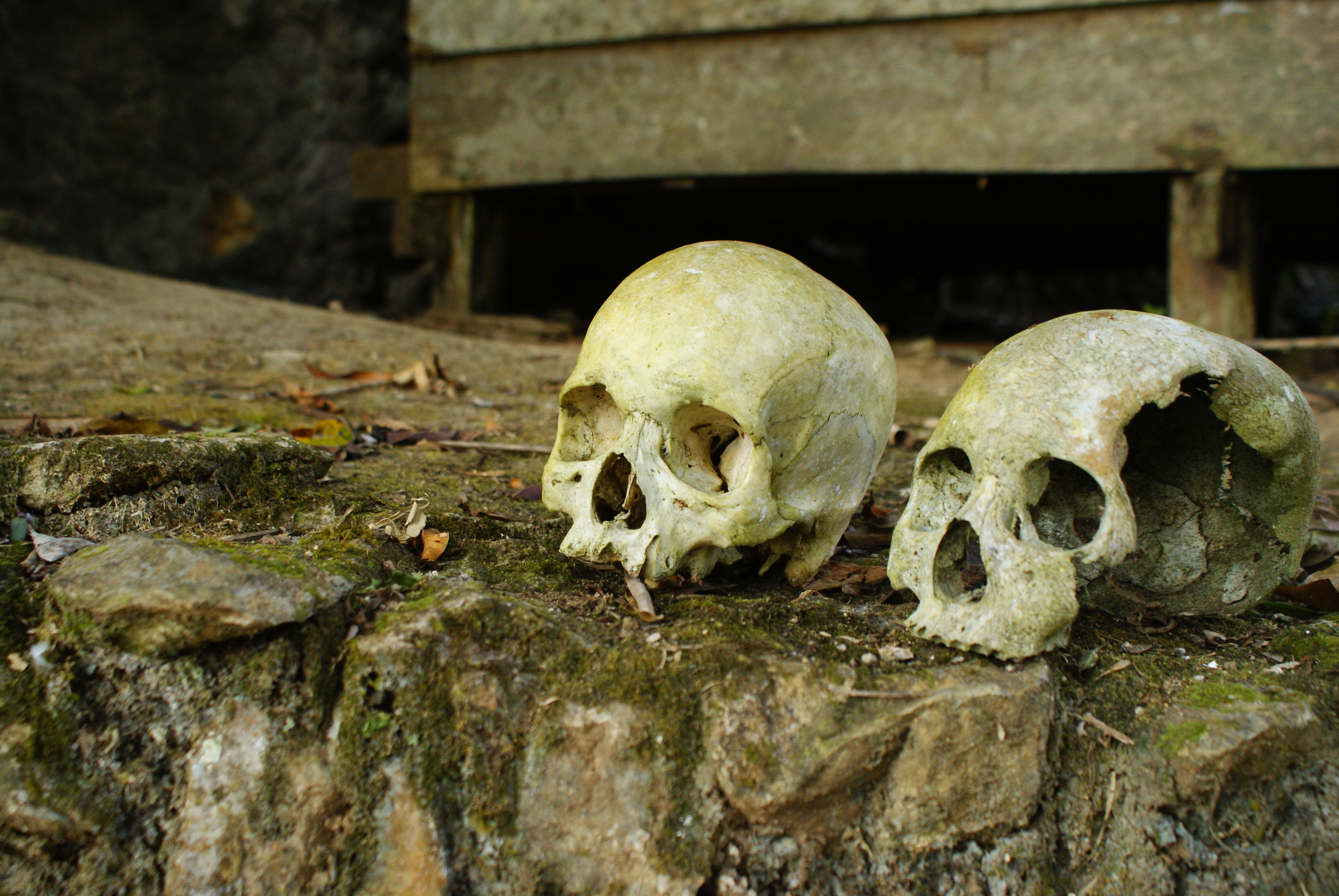
- Human skulls
- Specialty: Psychology

Necrophobia is the specific phobia of dead organisms (e.g., corpses) as well as things associated with death (e.g., coffins, tombstones, funerals, cemeteries). With all types of emotions, obsession with death becomes evident in both fascination and objectification. In a cultural sense, necrophobia may also be used to mean a fear of the dead by a cultural group, e.g., a belief that the spirits of the dead will return to haunt the living.

The sufferer may experience this sensation all the time, or when something triggers the fear, like a close encounter with a dead animal or the funeral of a loved one or friend. The word necrophobia is derived from the Greek nekros (νεκρός) for "corpse" and the Greek phobos (φόβος) for "fear".

== Causes ==
Necrophobia can have a variety of causes, many of which are still being researched. Many cases of Necrophobia are caused by a traumatic incident, such as a close loved one or pet dying, or encountering a dead body. It has also been found that phobias result from a cultural, or learned response, meaning that an adult's anxiety, paranoia, and fear can be taught to a child that is observing it. That being said, some children can be more prone to anxiety and things of that sort through their genetics.

Another being influence can be the type of media that an individual is consuming. Movies and books from the Horror genre tend to generate a lot of fear around the dead. Researcher Matthew Hudson points out that "our brains are continuously anticipating and preparing us for action in response to threat, and horror movies exploit this expertly to enhance our excitement." Although this is meant to be inducing feeling of excitement, it can harbor emotions of fear. In addition to this, unresolved stress tends to invoke 'defensive and escaping behavior' and can be a contributing factor in necrophobia.

== Symptoms ==
When experiencing effects from necrophobia, symptoms can vary for each individual. Some people can experience physical symptoms caused by triggers (e.g. encountering a dead body/animal, portrayal of death, etc.). These symptoms can include:

- Dizziness or lightheadedness
- Choking sensations
- Shortness of breath
- Sweaty palms
- Racing heart
- Prickly sensations like pins and needles
- Excessive sweating
- Tightness in chest
- Hot and cold flashes
- Trembling or shaking
- Numbness

As well as some psychological symptoms, such as:

- An intense feeling of fear and discomfort
- Feeling of losing control or fainting
- Fear of dying
- Inability to distinguish reality
- Feeling of detachment from one’s body
- An urge to escape or avoid the situation

== Origin ==
Necrophobia's known origins stem from Ancient Greek culture and have been present since the Neolithic period. At this time, it was a believed fear that the dead would arise in a state that was "neither living or dead, but rather 'undead.'" They believed that the purpose for this was to harm the living. Because of this fear, many or corpses have been uncovered with stones and amphora fragments placed on them. This was done as a way to pin down the body as a means of ensuring that it will not rise.

The fear that the dead will rejoin the living seemingly connect to their belief in the body and soul separating at death, implying that the soul lives on in another form (e.g., reincarnation, afterlife, etc.). This belief lead people to think that the soul can also be reconnected to the body, or that another spirit could take its place.

== Treatment ==
Although there are no known ways to prevent or cure Necrophobia, there are several treatment options that can help people that people that experienced it. Many treatments involve psychotherapy, such as cognitive behavioral therapy, and Exposure Therapy. Exposure therapy has actually been found to be the most effective at treating this disorder through desensitization. Medication can also be prescribed to treat this phobia. The antibiotic D-cycloserine is believed to facilitate fear extinction, and can be administered to treat specific phobias.

There are also ways to help yourself cope with phobias as well. These include:

- Practice relaxation techniques such as meditation, yoga, deep breathing, etc.
- Confide in a trusted person about your feelings.
- Join a support group to share and learn from the experiences of others.
- Try adopting mindfulness.
- Don’t isolate yourself as that can lead to further complications.

== See also ==
- List of phobias
- Thanatophobia
