= Mortality salience =

Awareness about death

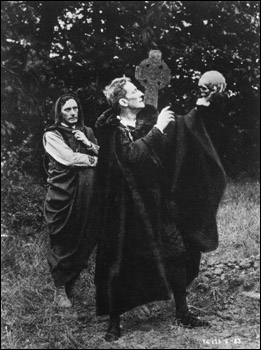
Hamlet contemplates the skull of Yorick, Hamlet (1913).

Mortality salience is the awareness that one's death is inevitable and that all attempts to defer it indefinitely are ultimately futile.

The term derives from terror management theory, which proposes the so-called mortality salience hypothesis: mortality salience causes existential anxiety that may be buffered by one's cultural worldview and/or a sense of self-esteem.

== Terror management theory ==
Mortality salience engages the conflict humans have to face both their instinct to avoid death completely, and their intellectual knowledge that avoiding death is ultimately futile. According to terror management theory, when human beings begin to contemplate their mortality and their vulnerability to death, feelings of terror emerge because of the simple fact that humans want to avoid their inevitable death. Mortality salience comes into effect because humans contribute all of their actions to either avoiding death or distracting themselves from contemplating it. Thus, terror management theory asserts that almost all human activity is driven by the fear of death.

Most research done on terror management theory revolves around the mortality salience paradigm. It has been found that religious people as well as religious fundamentalists are less vulnerable to mortality salience manipulations, and so religious believers engage in cultural worldview defense to a lesser extent than nonreligious people.

== Self-esteem ==
Mortality salience is highly manipulated by one's self-esteem. People with low self-esteem are more apt to experience the effects of mortality salience, whereas people with high self-esteem are better able to cope with the idea that their death is uncontrollable. As an article states, "according to terror management theory, increased self-esteem should enhance the functioning of the cultural anxiety buffer and thereby provide protection against death concerns".

== Potential to cause worldview defense ==
Mortality salience has the potential to cause worldview defense, a psychological mechanism that strengthens people's connection with their in-group as a defense mechanism. Studies also show that mortality salience can lead people to feel more inclined to punish what they believe to be minor moral transgressions. One such study divided a group of judges into two groups—one that was asked to reflect upon their mortality, and one group that was not. The judges were then asked to set a bond for an alleged prostitute. The group that had reflected on mortality set an average bond of $455, while the control group's average bond was $50. What prompted the increase is unclear, only the correlation was demonstrated. Possible interpretations include cultural beliefs about maintaining moral codes leading to a successful afterlife as promised in religions incentivizing the punishment of moral transgressions, or that the increased punishments could simply represent a desire to be more impactful on the world before death, some other cause, or multiple.

Another study found that mortality salience could cause an increase in support for martyrdom and military intervention. It found that students who reflected on their mortality preferred people who supported martyrdom, and indicated they might consider martyrdom themselves. They also found that, especially among politically conservative students, mortality salience increased support for military intervention, but not among students who were politically liberal.

== Gender, emotion and sex ==
A study tested "the hypothesis that mortality salience intensifies gender differences in reactions to sexual and emotional infidelity". In the study, participants were asked to work through packets containing mortality salience manipulation questions. In the results, they found that "sex is more relevant to the self-esteem of men than women and being in a committed relationship is relatively more important to women than for men". Therefore, when linking mortality salience to gender, emotion, and sex, men are more likely to suffer from sexual infidelity, and women are more likely to suffer from emotional infidelity. The results of this study showed that there is a logistic regression revealing a significant three-way interaction between gender, sex value, and mortality salience for the item pitting "passionate sex" against "emotional attachment".

== See also ==
- Awareness of Dying
- Being-toward-death
- Birthday effect
- Chamber of Reflection, initiation ritual in Freemasonry
- Cognitive dissonance
- Death anxiety
- Existential psychology
- Melancholia
- Memento mori, the medieval Latin Christian theory and practice of reflection on mortality
- Social psychology
- Suicidal ideation
