= Tom Pyszczynski =

American social psychologist

Thomas A. Pyszczynski (/pɪzˈtʃɪnskiː/) (born 1954) is an American social psychologist. He is notable, together with Jeff Greenberg and Sheldon Solomon, for founding the field of terror management theory (TMT) in 1986.
