= Jeff Greenberg (professor) =

American social psychologist

Jeff Greenberg is a social psychology professor at the University of Arizona. He is notable for coining the concept of Terror Management Theory, with two of his colleagues, Sheldon Solomon and Tom Pyszczynski.

Jeff Greenberg is also featured in the 2003 documentary Flight From Death, a film that investigates the relationship of human violence to fear of death, as related to subconscious influences.
