= Yalom =

Yalom (Hebrew: יהלום or יאלום, meaning: Diamond) is a surname. Notable people with the surname include:

- Irvin D. Yalom (born 1931), American existential psychiatrist
- Marilyn Yalom (1932–2019), American writer and historian
