= When Nietzsche Wept (novel) =

Book by Irvin D. Yalom

- First edition (publ. Basic Books)
- Author: Irvin D. Yalom
- Language: English
- Publisher: Basic Books
- Publication date: 1992
- ISBN: 0-465-09172-5 (first edition)
- Dewey Decimal: 813.54
- LC Class: PS3575.A39 W47

When Nietzsche Wept is a 1992 novel by Irvin D. Yalom. The book takes place mostly in Vienna, Austria, in the year 1882, and relates a fictional meeting between the doctor Josef Breuer and the German philosopher Friedrich Nietzsche. The novel is a review of the history of philosophy and psychoanalysis and some of the main personalities of the last decades of the 19th century, and revolves around the topic of "limerence".

== Plot ==
Lou Salomé, who was involved with Friedrich Nietzsche, has written a letter stating that the future of the philosophy of Germany is at stake and that Nietzsche needs help desperately. The plot develops into a therapy in which Doctor Josef Breuer needs to have his soul treated to help him get over a patient whom he treated for hysteria and with whom he has fallen in love, while Nietzsche needs help with his migraines. Influenced by the revolutionary ideas of his young disciple Sigmund Freud, Josef Breuer starts the dangerous strategy that will become the origin of psychoanalysis. Thanks to their unusual relation, both of them will see how their perspective of life changes completely. The story also explains how Friedrich Nietzsche received the inspiration to write his famous book, Thus Spoke Zarathustra.

== References to famous personalities ==
Yalom's book is fictional but contains many references to history and historical personalities: Josef and Mathilde Breuer, Friedrich Nietzsche, Lou Salome, Sigmund Freud, Bertha Pappenheim, Paul Rée as well as mentioning Franz Overbeck, and the composer Richard Wagner.

== Adaptations ==
In 2007 Yalom's novel received a film adaptation by the director Pinchas Perry, starring Armand Assante, Ben Cross and Katheryn Winnick. This independent American drama was filmed in Bulgaria.

There is also a theatre play based on the novel, adapted by Luciano Cazaux. The roles of Friedrich Nietzsche and Josef Breuer are performed by the actors Luciano Suardi and Claudio Da Passano. The play reflects the intellectual and philosophical atmosphere of the novel, almost dreamlike sometimes. An example of those details is that the female characters of the play wear colorful dresses, while the male characters wear black or grey suits; that is because the play tries to represent its reality from the point of view of the intellectual men of that period. The theatre play has received positive reviews in general, commending the work of the actors and actresses.

In 2012, on the occasion of the 150th anniversary of the birth of Lou Salome, the woman who plays a key role in the book, another theatrical adaptation of the novel was made by the theatrologist and translator of Yalom in Greek, Evangelia Andritsanou. The performance featured only three male actors (one of whom, Haris Fragoulis, was awarded the Horn Prize for his performance as Sigmund Freud) who brought the play to life, sometimes as narrators and sometimes playing roles. The three women, Lou Salomé, Anna O., and Mrs. Breuer are presented through the eyes and voice of the men.

== See also ==
- When Nietzsche Wept, the film adaptation of the book
- The Schopenhauer Cure
