= When Nietzsche Wept =

- Theatrical release poster
- Directed by: Pinchas Perry
- Written by: Pinchas Perry
- Based on: When Nietzsche Wept by Irvin D. Yalom
- Produced by: Boaz Davidson; Danny Dimbort; Avi Lerner; Kristina Nikolova; Pinchas Perry; Trevor Short; John Thompson
- Starring: Armand Assante; Ben Cross; Katheryn Winnick; Michal Yannai; Jamie Elman; Ivaylo Brusovski; Joanna Pacula
- Cinematography: Georgi Nikolov
- Edited by: David Jakubovic
- Music by: Sharon Farber
- Production company: Millennium Films
- Distributed by: First Look International
- Release date: July 7, 2007 (Israel)
- Running time: 105 minutes
- Countries: Bulgaria; United States
- Language: English

When Nietzsche Wept (German: Als Nietzsche Weinte) is a 2007 American drama film directed by Pinchas Perry and starring Armand Assante, Ben Cross and Katheryn Winnick. Based on the novel of the same name by Irvin D. Yalom, it was filmed in Bulgaria.

== Plot ==
The film opens with the Russian-born novelist—who eventually became a member of Freud's 'Vienna Circle'—Lou Andreas-Salome (Katheryn Winnick) who had an unconsummated (Platonic) 'love affair' with German philosopher Friedrich Nietzsche (Armand Assante), and to whom he allegedly proposed in 1882 (although whether her claims are true is very much up for debate). Writing a letter to Dr Josef Breuer (Ben Cross), after hearing of his newly developed talking cure (Breuer was a friend and mentor of Sigmund Freud (Jamie Elman), who also appears in the story, and one of the influential fathers of psychoanalysis). The two meet, and a reluctant and troubled Breuer agrees to Salome's plan; to cure the intense migraine attacks that plague Nietzsche, and at the same time, without his knowing, cure the despair that her refusal of marriage has inflicted upon him.

Salome has persuaded Franz Overbeck (Nietzsche's friend) to send him to Breuer. However, Nietzsche offers no support to Breuer, thinking that accepting his treatment would be surrendering his power to Breuer, so the course of treatment must end. In a chilling parallel, an encounter with a mistreated horse causes Nietzsche to redeem his appointment with Breuer (Nietzsche finally went mad after stopping a man from whipping a horse using his own body, before breaking down in tears and descending into insanity). Nietzsche later visits a whorehouse, where he has another migraine attack, exacerbated by the overuse of a sleeping draught (a chemical substance with psychoactive properties). Nietzsche decides that he will, instead of pursuing treatment, leave for Basel. Meanwhile, an up-and-coming psychologist, Sigmund Freud, student of Dr. Breuer, suggests that if he was to make some confession to Nietzsche, he may stop seeing any positive sentiment shown as a bid for power, and indulge in confessions of his own. All while still under the guise that Dr. Breuer is only treating Nietzsche's migraines.

So, the next time they met, Breuer makes the suggestion that, while he treats Nietzsche's body, Nietzsche must "treat" Breuer of the despair that he feels after falling in love with one of his patients, Bertha Pappenheim (played by Michal Yannai), otherwise known as Anna O., a famous case which was discussed in a joint book published by Breuer and Freud in 1895, a work largely recognized as having major influences on the early psychoanalysis movement.

The confessions lead to the two becoming open with each other, learning each other's way of life and finally becoming friends, but not before the film has explored a great deal of Nietzsche's philosophy and Breuer's psychoanalysis. Breuer's anguish over his supposed unhappiness is explored by means of his highly symbol-laden dreams, thus showing the importance of dream interpretation as a stepping stone in what would constitute Freud's approach to psychoanalytic techniques.

The film ends with Dr. Breuer reentering a happy relationship with his wife, after finding clearance and reassurance in a hypnotically induced dream, where aspects of Nietzsche's teachings and advice aid in his grand transformation. Nietzsche (now cured of his despair and agonizing migraines) boards a train to move to Switzerland. The film recognizes that there on the shores of Lake Silvaplana, he would write Thus Spoke Zarathustra, his most well-known work.

== Cast ==
- Ben Cross as Josef Breuer
- Armand Assante as Friedrich Nietzsche
- Joanna Pacula as Mathilde Breuer
- Michal Yannai as Bertha Pappenheim
- Jamie Elman as Sigmund Freud
- Andreas Beckett as Zarathustra
- Katheryn Winnick as Lou Salome
- Rachel O'Meara as Frau Becker
- Yzhar Charuzi as Hush Man
- Ilan Charusi as Carmen Barman
- Tal Fructer as Girl by Pianist
- Silvia Terzieva as Mrs. Fiefer
- Ivaylo Brusovki as Mendel Fiefer
- Paula Dominguez as Mia Breuer

== Historical accuracy ==
The film is largely fictional, though many facts and events are taken from the characters' real lives and inserted into the film for narrative purposes. The book from which the film was based was an exploration of the hypothetical conjunction of Nietzsche's, Breuer's, and Freud's destinies, and their later contributions in the development of psychoanalysis, of which Nietzsche's thought played a significant part.

Besides the historical characters directly depicted, there are also references to Paul Rée, Franz Overbeck and Richard Wagner.
