= Leslie H. Farber =

American psychologist and author

Leslie Hillel Farber (July 11, 1912 – March 1981) was an American author, psychiatrist, director of therapy at Austen Riggs Center in Stockbridge, Massachusetts, chairman of the faculty of the Washington School of Psychiatry, and vice president of the William Alanson White Psychiatric Foundation.

He is particularly known for his concept of "two realms of will".

== Life and career ==
Farber received his medical degree from Stanford University in 1938. He became training and supervisory analyst at the Washington Psychoanalytic Institute and director of therapy at Austen Riggs Center in Stockbridge, Massachusetts. Farber was in private practice in Fairfax, Marin County, CA, before practicing in Manhattan. He married twice. His son by his first wife, Midge, was Steven Farber, Ph.D., a psychologist at St. Elizabeth's in Washington, DC, until Steven's death. After divorce from Midge, Leslie Farber had two sons with his widow, Anne, Seth Farber, the jazz pianist, and Luke Farber. His daughter by Anne is Phoebe Farber.

He was chairman of the faculty of the Washington School of Psychiatry from 1955 to 1962 and member of the board of trustees of the William Alanson White Psychiatric Foundation from 1956 to 1961, of which he also served as vice president.

From 1963 to 1977, Farber was chairman of the Association of Existential Psychology and Psychiatry. He was in private practice in Manhattan after 1969.

Leslie Farber had two siblings. His brother David was a psychiatrist and his brother Manny a painter, film critic and writer.

== Work ==
Attention has been frequently drawn to his concept of "two realms of will" which has been cited, among others, by existential psychotherapist Irvin D. Yalom in his 1980 book Existential Psychotherapy.

According to Farber, in the first realm, will is an unconscious phenomenon, whereas in the second realm, will is utilitarian, moves toward an objective and is (at least potentially) conscious. In Farber's words:

"The first realm of will moves in a direction rather than towards a particular object. [...] While this way must, to some degree, remain impenetrable to inspection, its predominant experience is one of freedom—the freedom to think, speak, and act forthrightly and responsibly, without blinking the hazards such freedom entails.
In the second realm of will, will moves us to a particular objective, all such movement being either conscious or potentially conscious. This could be said to be a utilitarian will, in that we do this to get that.
[...] All of us [...] live our lives in both realms, trusting that the achievements of the second realm will correct the indulgences of the first, and that the freedom of the first realm will provide some direction and scope for the activity of the second."

Farber emphasized:

"it seems to me that increasingly we apply the will of the second realm to those portions of life that not only will not comply, but that become distorted—or even vanish—under such coercion.
Let me give a few examples: I can will knowledge, but not wisdom; going to bed, but not sleeping; eating, but not hunger; meekness, but not humility; scrupulosity, but not virtue; self-assertion or bravado, but not courage; lust, but not love; commiseration, but not sympathy; congratulation, but not admiration; religiosity, but not faith; reading, but not understanding. I would emphasize that the consequence of willing what cannot be willed is that we fall into the distress we call anxiety.

He indicated further examples of misdirected "willing what cannot be willed" contributing to anxiety, including for example also a "will to be creative and spontaneous" and "most urgently, will to will".

The first realm has been compared to effortless doing (wu wei) of Taoism, the second to purposive action (yu-wei according to philosophers of the time of Zhuangzi).

Edgar Z. Friedenberg has commented that Farber's conception of the will and the existential plight of man appears to have been strongly influenced by T. S. Eliot.

== Books ==
- Lying, Despair, Jealousy, Envy, Sex, Suicide, Drugs, and the Good Life, 1976
- The Ways of the Will, 1966
