= Lou Andreas-Salomé =

Psychoanalyst and author (1861–1937)

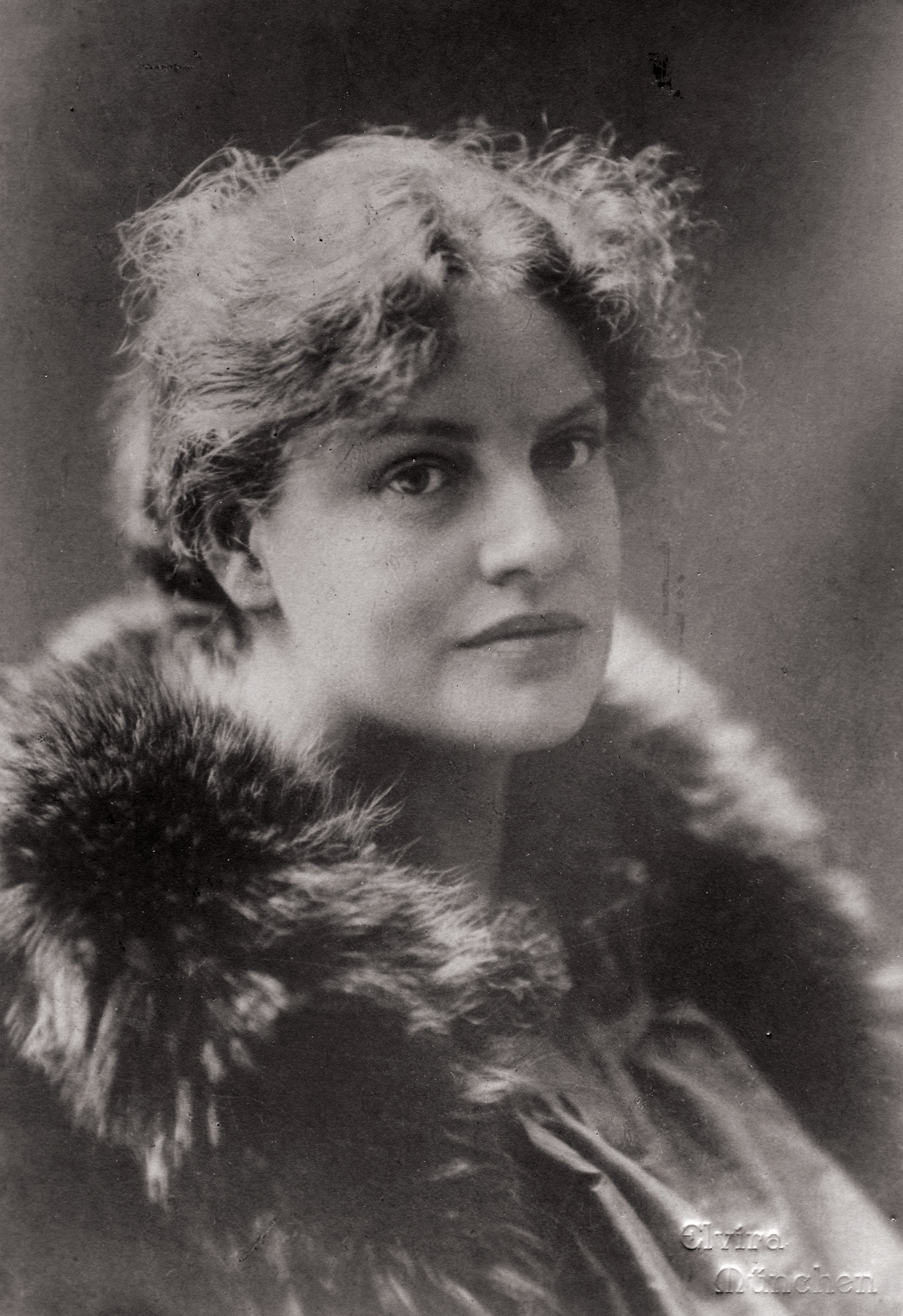
- Lou Andreas-Salomé in 1897
- Born: Louise von Salomé; 12 February 1861; Saint Petersburg, Russian Empire
- Died: 5 February 1937 (aged 75); Göttingen, Germany
- Education: University of Zurich

Lou Andreas-Salomé (born either Louise von Salomé or Luíza Gustavovna Salomé or Lioulia von Salomé, Russian: Луиза Густавовна Саломе; 12 February 1861 – 5 February 1937) was a Russian-born psychoanalyst and a well-traveled author, narrator, and essayist from a French Huguenot-German family. Her diverse intellectual interests led to friendships with a broad array of distinguished thinkers, including Friedrich Nietzsche, Sigmund Freud, Paul Rée, and Rainer Maria Rilke.

== Early years ==
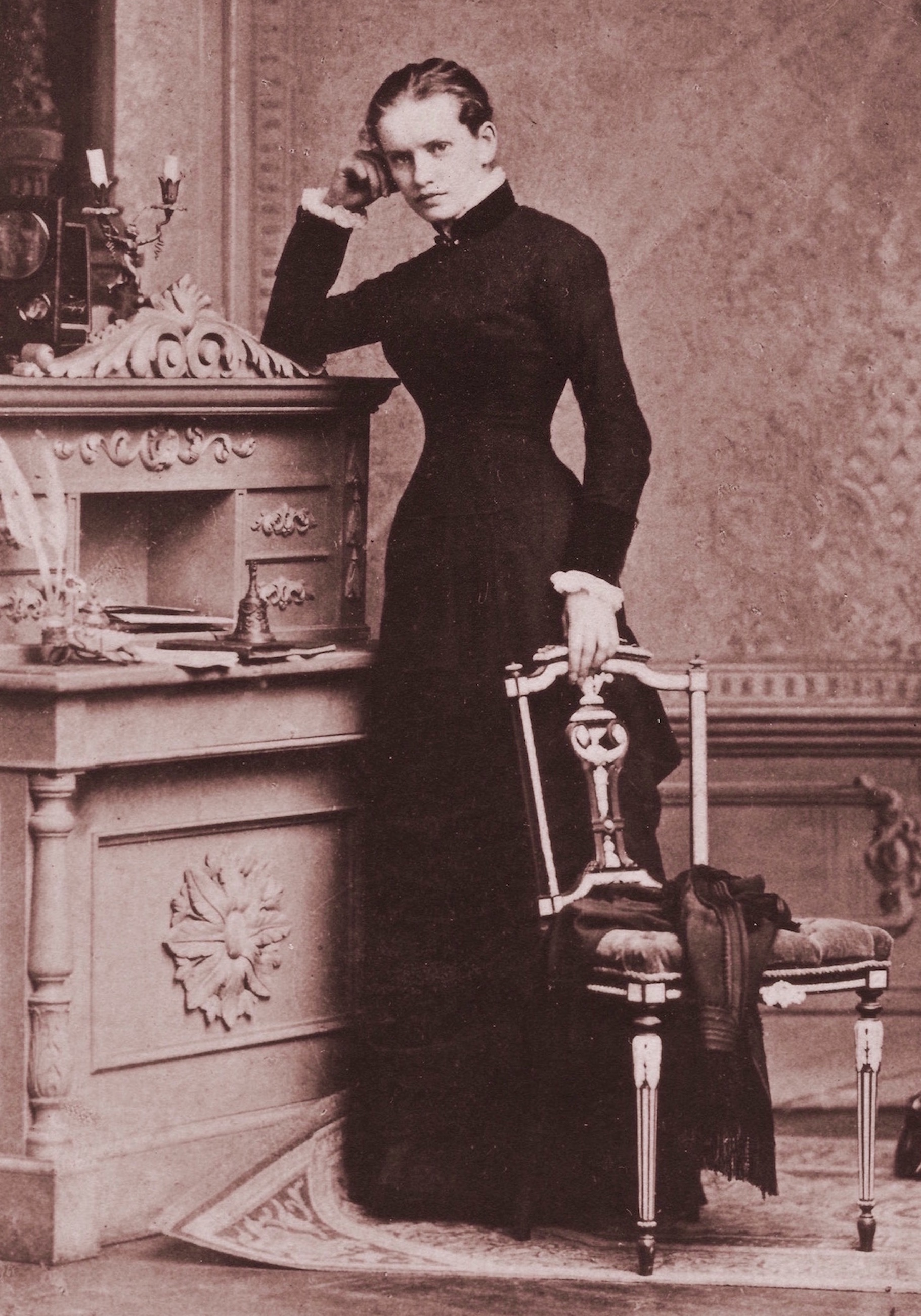
Lou Salomé, circa 1880

Lou Salomé was born in St. Petersburg to Gustav Ludwig von Salomé (1807–1878), and Louise von Salomé (née Wilm) (1823–1913). Lou was their youngest child and only daughter; they had five sons. Although she would later be attacked by the Nazis as a "Finnish Jew", her parents were of French Huguenot and Northern German descent. She grew up in a wealthy and well-cultured household, with all children learning Russian, German, and French; Salomé was allowed to attend her brothers' classes.

Born into a strictly Protestant family, Salomé grew to resent the Reformed church and Hermann Dalton, the Orthodox Protestant pastor. She refused to be confirmed by Dalton, officially left the church at age 16, but remained interested in intellectual pursuits in the areas of philosophy, literature and religion.

She was interested in the sermons of the Dutch pastor Hendrik Gillot, who tutored her in the fields of theology, philosophy, world religions, and French and German literature.

According to Salomé in Ruth, written after Gillot's death, he became so smitten with her that he wanted to divorce his wife and marry her. Her account is doubted by her biographer Rudolph Binion, but in any case, Salomé claims she turned him down.

Following her father's death in 1879, Salomé and her mother went to Zurich so that Salomé could acquire a university education as a "guest student." In her one year at the University of Zurich—one of the few schools that accepted female students—Salomé attended lectures in philosophy (logic, history of philosophy, ancient philosophy, and psychology) and theology (dogmatics). During this time, Salomé's physical health was failing due to lung disease, causing her to cough up blood. Due to this, she was instructed to heal in warmer climates, so in February 1882, Salomé and her mother went to Rome.

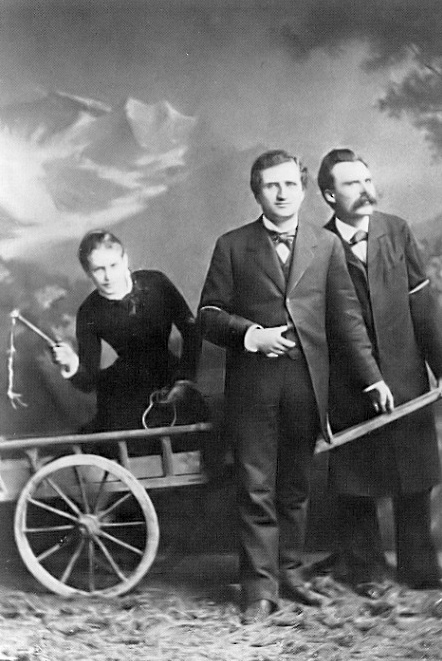
Left to right, Salomé, Rée and Nietzsche (1882)

== Rée and Nietzsche, and later life ==
Salomé's mother took her to Rome when Salomé was 21. At a literary salon in the city, Salomé became acquainted with the author Paul Rée. Rée proposed to her, but she instead suggested that they live and study together as 'brother and sister' along with another man for company, and thereby establish an academic commune. Rée accepted the idea, and suggested that they be joined by his friend Friedrich Nietzsche.

The two met Nietzsche in Rome in April 1882. Nietzsche is believed to have instantly fallen in love with Salomé, as Rée had earlier done. Nietzsche asked Rée to propose marriage to Salomé on his behalf, which she rejected, although interested in Nietzsche as a friend. Nietzsche nonetheless was content to join Rée and Salomé touring through Switzerland and Italy together, planning their commune. On 13 May, in Lucerne, when Nietzsche was alone with Salomé, he earnestly proposed marriage to her again, and she again rejected him. He was happy to continue with the plans for an academic commune.

After discovering the situation, Nietzsche's sister Elisabeth Förster-Nietzsche became determined to separate him from Salomé whom she described as an "immoral woman".

Nonetheless, Nietzsche, Rée, and Salomé travelled with Salomé's mother through Italy and considered where they would set up their "Winterplan" commune. This commune was intended to be set up in an abandoned monastery. Having found no suitable location, the plan was abandoned.

After arriving in Leipzig in October 1882, the three spent a number of weeks together. However, the following month Rée and Salomé parted company with Nietzsche, leaving for Stibbe without any plans to meet again. Nietzsche soon fell into a period of mental anguish, although he continued to write to Rée, asking him, "We shall see one another from time to time, won't we?" In later recriminations, Nietzsche would blame the failure in his attempts to woo Salomé both on Salomé, Rée, and on the intrigues of his sister (who had written letters to the families of Salomé and Rée to disrupt their plans for the commune). Nietzsche wrote of the affair in 1883 that he felt "genuine hatred for [his] sister."

Salomé would later (1894) write a study, Friedrich Nietzsche in seinen Werken (Friedrich Nietzsche in his Works), of Nietzsche's personality and philosophy.

In 1884 Salomé became acquainted with Helene von Druskowitz, the second woman to receive a philosophy doctorate in Zurich. It was also rumoured that Salomé later had a romantic relationship with Sigmund Freud.

== Marriage and relationships ==
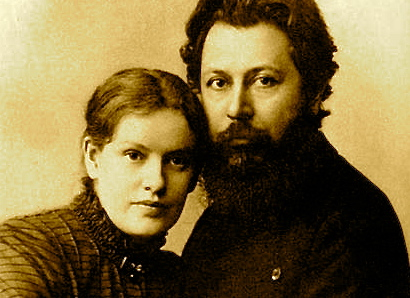
Lou Andreas-Salomé and Friedrich Carl Andreas, 1886

Salomé and Rée moved to Berlin and lived together until a few years before her celibate marriage to linguistics scholar Friedrich Carl Andreas. Salomé's co-habitation with Andreas caused the despairing Rée to fade from Salomé's life despite her assurances. Despite her opposition to marriage and her open relationships with other men, Salomé and Andreas remained married from 1887 until his death in 1930.

Throughout her married life, von Salomé was engaged in affairs, and many in-depth correspondences. Accounts of many of her relationships are given in her volume Lebensrückblick.

Her lovers and/or correspondents included the German journalist and politician Georg Ledebour; the Austrian poet Rainer Maria Rilke, about whom she wrote an analytical memoir and the psychiatrist Sigmund Freud.

Her affair with the Viennese physician Friedrich Pineles ended in an abortion and a renunciation of motherhood.

She was also involved with the handsome and melancholic Victor Tausk, a member of the Vienna Psychoanalytic Society, 18 years her junior.

== Meeting Rilke ==
In May 1897, in Munich, she met Rilke, who had been introduced to her by Jacob Wassermann. She was 36 while Rilke was only 20. She had already published with some success Im Kampf um Gott, "where she exposed the problem of loss of faith (which had been her own for a long time)," several articles, and the study Jesus der Jude, which Rilke had read.

As Philippe Jaccottet reports, Salomé wrote in Lebensrückblick: "I was your wife for years because you were the first reality, where man and body are indistinguishable from each other, an indisputable fact of life itself. I could have said literally what you told me when you confessed your love to me: Only you are real. That is how we became husband and wife even before we became friends, not by choice, but by this unfathomable marriage [...] We were brother and sister, but as in a distant past, before the marriage between brother and sister became sacrilegious."

In 1899, with her husband Friedrich-Carl, then again in 1900, Lou travelled to Russia, the second time with Rilke, whose first name she changed from René to Rainer. She taught him Russian, to read Tolstoy (whom he would later meet) and Pushkin. She introduced him to patrons and other people in the arts, remaining Rilke's advisor, confidante, and muse throughout his adult life. The romance between the poet and Salomé lasted three years, then turned into a friendship, which would continue until Rilke's death, as evidenced by their correspondence. In 1937, Freud said of Salomé's relationship with Rilke: "She was both the muse and the attentive mother of the great poet."

== Meeting Freud ==
Von Salomé met Freud in September 1911, on the occasion of the 3rd Congress of Psychoanalysis held in Weimar. Despite gossip about their romantic involvement, her relationship with Freud was intellectual. In one letter, Freud commends Salomé's deep understanding of people so much that he believed she understood people better than they understood themselves.

Von Salomé also knew Freud's daughter, Anna Freud. They met in Vienna and corresponded for years, as did Sigmund Freud and von Salomé. According to Anna Freud, von Salomé's work, Friedrich Nietzsche in seinen Werken (Friedrich Nietzsche in his works) effectively was psychoanalysis. It was the first book about the German philosopher.

== Death ==
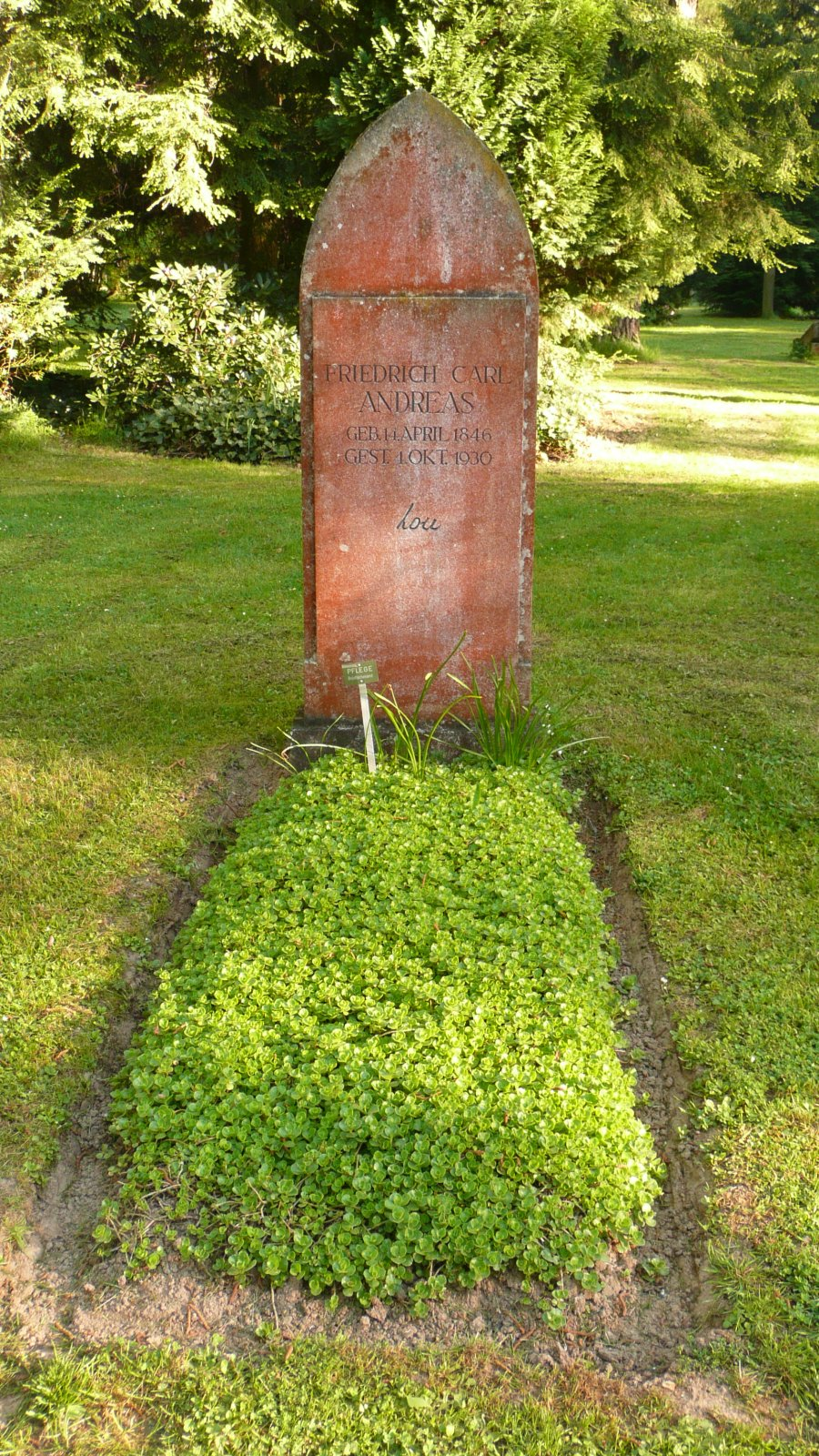
Lou Andreas-Salomé's grave in Göttingen

By 1930, Salomé was increasingly weak, suffered from a heart condition and diabetes, and had to be treated several times in the hospital. Her husband visited her daily during a six-week stay after a foot operation, which was arduous for the old, rather ill man, and this made them grow very close after a forty-year marriage marked by hurtful behaviour on both sides and long periods of non-communication. Freud appreciated this from afar, writing: "Only what is genuinely true proves itself so long-lasting." ("So dauerhaft beweist sich doch nur das Echte.") Friedrich Carl Andreas died of cancer in 1930, and Salomé herself underwent a difficult cancer operation in 1935. At the age of 74, she ceased to work as a psychoanalyst.

Salomé died of uremia in Göttingen on 5 February 1937. Her urn was laid to rest in her husband's grave in the cemetery on the Groner Landstraße in Göttingen. She is commemorated in the city by a memorial plaque outside the property where her house stood, a street named after her (Lou-Andreas-Salomé-Weg), and the name of the Lou Andreas-Salomé Institut für Psychoanalyse und Psychotherapie. A few days before her death, the Gestapo confiscated her library (according to other sources, it was an SA group who destroyed the library shortly after her death). The reasons given for this confiscation were that she had been a colleague of Sigmund Freud, had practised "a Jewish science", and owned many books by Jewish authors.

== Work ==
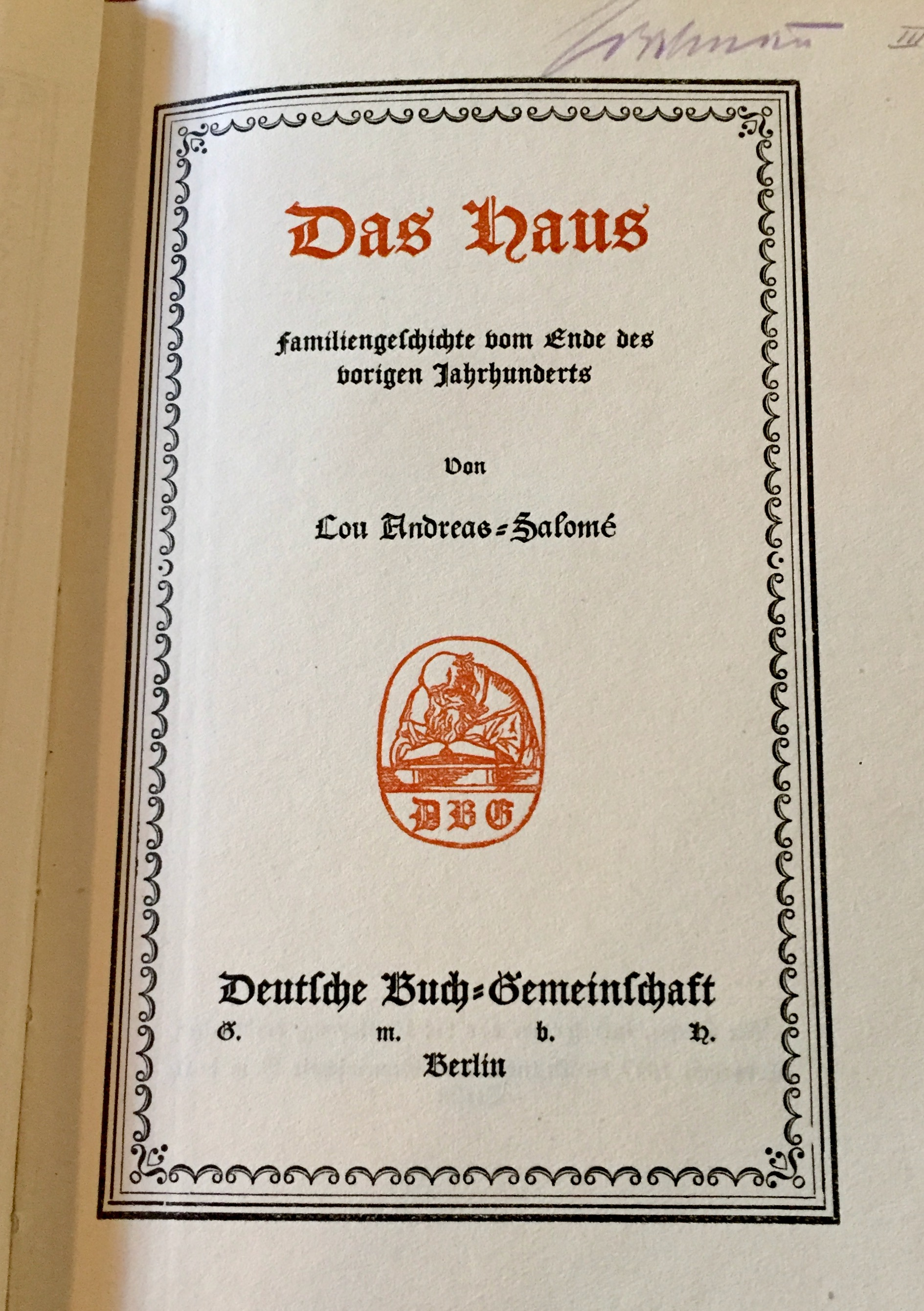
Title page of the 1927 edition of 'Das Haus', published by the German Book Community, a national book club.

Salomé was a prolific writer who wrote fiction, criticism and essays on religion, philosophy, sexuality and psychology. A uniform edition of her works is being published in Germany by MedienEdition Welsch. She authored a "Hymn to Life" that so deeply impressed Nietzsche that he was moved to set it to music. Salomé's literary and analytical studies became such a vogue in Göttingen, where she lived late in her life, that the Gestapo waited until shortly after her death to "clean" her library of works by Jews.

She was one of the first female psychoanalysts and one of the first women to write psychoanalytically on female sexuality, before Helene Deutsch, for instance in her essay on the anal-erotic (1916), an essay admired by Freud. However, she had written about the psychology of female sexuality before she ever met Freud, in her book Die Erotik (1911).

She wrote more than a dozen novels and novellas, including Im Kampf um Gott, Ruth, Rodinka, Ma, Fenitschka – eine Ausschweifung, as well as non-fiction studies such as Henrik Ibsens Frauengestalten (1892), a study of Ibsen's female characters, and a book on Nietzsche, Friedrich Nietzsche in seinen Werken (1894). The first English translation of her novel Das Haus (1921) appeared in 2021 under the title Anneliese's House, in an annotated edition by Frank Beck and Raleigh Whitinger.

Salomé edited a memoir about Rilke after his death in 1926. Among her works is also her Lebensrückblick, which she wrote during her last years based on memories of her life as a free woman. In her memoirs, first published in their original German in 1951, she goes into depth about her faith and her relationships.

Whoever reaches into a rosebush may seize a handful of flowers; but no matter how many one holds, it's only a small portion of the whole. Nevertheless, a handful is enough to experience the nature of the flowers. Only if we refuse to reach into the bush, because we can't possibly seize all the flowers at once, or if we spread out our handful of roses as if it were the whole of the bush itself—only then does it bloom apart from us, unknown to us, and we are left alone.

Salomé is said to have remarked in her last days, "I have really done nothing but work all my life, work ... why?" And in her last hours, as if talking to herself, she is reported to have said, "If I let my thoughts roam I find no one. The best, after all, is death."

== In fiction and film ==
Fictional accounts of Salomé's relationship with Nietzsche occur in four novels: Irvin Yalom's When Nietzsche Wept, Lance Olsen's Nietzsche's Kisses, Beatriz Rivas's La hora sin diosas (The time without goddesses), and William Bayer's The Luzern Photograph, in which two reenactments of the famous image of her with Nietzsche and Rée impact a murder in contemporary Oakland, California.

Mexican playwright Sabina Berman includes Lou Andreas-Salomé as a character in her 2000 play Feliz nuevo siglo, Doktor Freud (Freud Skating).

Salomé is also fictionalized in Angela von der Lippe's The Truth about Lou, in Brenda Webster's Vienna Triangle, in Clare Morgan's A Book for All and None, in Robert Langs' two-act play Freud's Bird of Prey, and in Araceli Bruch's five-act play Re-Call (written in Catalan).

In Liliana Cavani's movie Al di la' del bene e del male (Beyond Good and Evil) Salome is played by Dominique Sanda. In Pinchas Perry's film version of When Nietzsche Wept, Salome is played by Katheryn Winnick.

Lou Salome, an opera in two acts by Giuseppe Sinopoli with libretto from Karl Dietrich Gräwe, premiered in 1981 at the Bavarian State Opera, with August Everding as General Director, staging by Götz Friedrich and set design by Andreas Reinhardt.

Lou Andreas-Salomé, The Audacity to be Free, a German-language movie directed by Cordula Kablitz-Post, was released in German cinemas on 30 June 2016. Andreas-Salome is portrayed onscreen by Katharina Lorenz and as a young woman by Liv Lisa Fries. The film was released in New York City and Los Angeles in April 2018, with a wider release to follow.

The Locked Body of Lou (Заклученото тело на Лу) is a postmodern novel by Macedonian author Olivera Kjorveziroska, published in 2005. The novel explores the character of Lou Andreas-Salomé from a biofictional perspective.

Lou Andreas-Salome is the namesake of the indie rock band Lou Salome.

== Bibliography ==
Lou Andreas-Salomé's published works as cited by An Encyclopedia of Continental Women Writers.

- Im Kampf um Gott, 1885.
- Henrik Ibsens Frau-Gestalten, 1892.
- Friedrich Nietzsche in seinen Werken, 1894.
- Ruth, 1895, 1897.
- Fenitschka. Eine Ausschweifung, 1898,1983.
- Menschenkinder, 1899.
- Aus fremder Seele, 1901.
- Ma, 1901.
- Im Zwischenland, 1902.
- Die Erotik, 1910.
- Drei Briefe an einen Knaben, 1917.
- Das Haus, 1919,1927.
- Die Stunde ohne Gott und andere Kindergeschichten, 1921.
- Der Teufel und seine Grossmutter, 1922.
- Rodinka, 1923.
- Rainer Maria Rilke, 1928.
- Mein Dank an Freud: Offener Brief an Professor Freud zu seinem 75 Geburtstag, 1931.
- Lebensrückblick. Grundriss einiger Lebenserinnerungen, ed. E. Pfeiffer, 1951, 1968.
- Rainer Maria Rilke – Lou Andreas-Salomé. Briefwechsel, ed. E. Pfeiffer, 1952.
- In der Schule bei Freud, ed. E. Pfeiffer, 1958.
- Sigmund Freud – Lou Andreas-Salomé. Briefwechsel, ed. E. Pfeiffer, 1966.
- Friedrich Nietzsche, Paul Rée, Lou von Salomé: Die Dokumente ihrer Begegnung, ed. E. Pfeiffer, 1970.

Translations

- The Freud Journal of Lou Andreas-Salomé, tr. Stanley Leavy, 1964.
- Sigmund Freud and Lou Andreas-Salomé, Letters, tr. byu W. and E. Robson Scott, 1972.
- Ibsen's Heroines, ed., tr., and introd. by Siegfried Mandel, 1985.
- Anneliese's House, edited and translated by Frank Beck and Raleigh Whitinger. Boydell and Brewer, 2021.
