= Existential Psychotherapy =

Existential Psychotherapy can refer to:

- Existential psychotherapy, an approach in the field of psychotherapy
- Existential Psychotherapy (book), a book (1980) on existential psychotherapy by Irvin D. Yalom
