= Michal Yannai =

Israeli actress

- מיכל ינאי
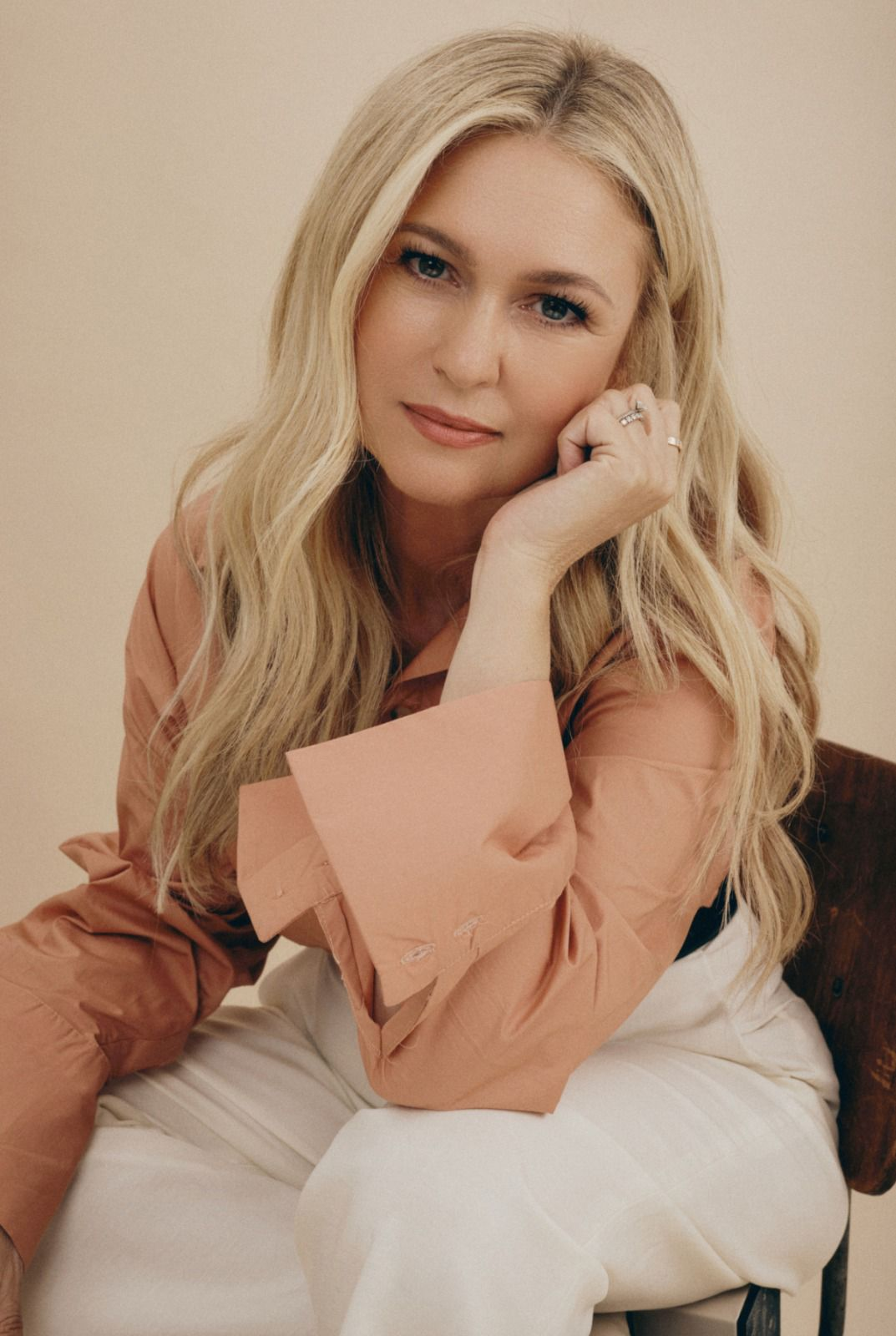
- Yannai in 2023
- Born: 18 June 1972 (age 53); Ramat Gan, Israel
- Occupations: Actress, Singer
- Spouses: Ofer Resles (m. 2003–2005) Ben Muskal (m. 2009)
- Children: 3

Michal Yannai-Muskal (or Yanai, Hebrew: מיכל ינאי; born 18 June 1972) is an Israeli actress and children's television host.

== Early and personal life ==
Yannai was born and raised in Ramat Gan to a family of Jewish background.

In 2003, Yanai married Israeli businessman Ofer Resles. They divorced in 2005. She remarried in March 2009, to Israeli businessman Ben Muskal. In November 2009 their daughter Alex was born, and in December 2010, a son named Yahel. They have another son together named Yuval. As of 2021, they reside in Athens, Greece.

== Career ==
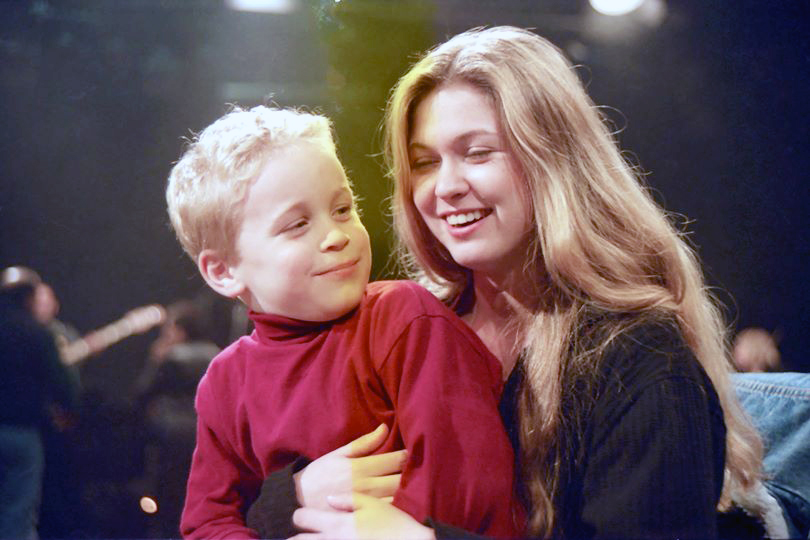
Yannai on Israel's Arutz HaYeladim Channel in 1992

During the 1990s Yannai was a TV host and an actress on Arutz HaYeladim (the Israeli Children's Channel, "Arutz 6", ערוץ הילדים), where she was known as "The Children's Queen" (מלכת הילדים). During the 1990s Michal Yannai also hosted the show "Katzefet" on Arutz HaYeladim. In 2007 she participated in the Israeli version of the stage show, Avenue Q, as a satire of herself.

== Filmography ==
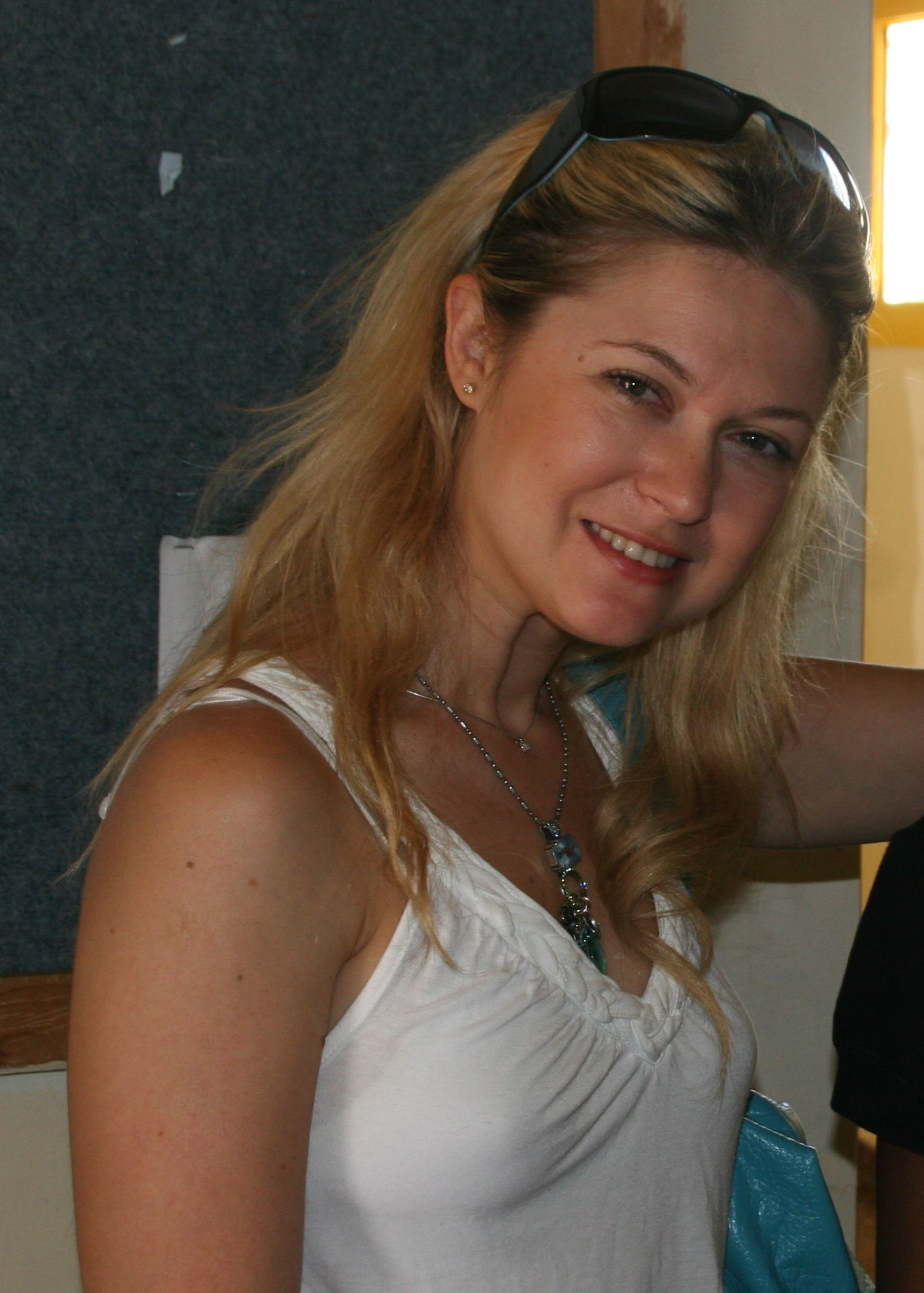
Yannai in 2006

- Neshika Bametzach (The Day We Met, 1990) as Natalie
- Pour Sacha (1991) as English girl #1
- Hakeves Ha Shisha Asar (The Sixteenth Sheep, 1999) as Michal
- 88 Minutes (2007) as Leeza Pearson
- Mega Snake (2007) as Fay
- When Nietzsche Wept (2007) as Bertha

== See also ==
- Television of Israel
- Theater of Israel
