= Responsibility assumption =

Doctrine in existential psychotherapy

In existential psychotherapy, responsibility assumption is the doctrine, practiced by therapists such as Irvin D. Yalom where an individual taking responsibility for the events and circumstances in their lives is seen as a necessary basis for their making any genuine change.

== Overview ==
From the therapist's viewpoint, the goal is to identify these events and circumstances, always operating, in Yalom's words, "within the frame of reference that the patient has created his[/her] own distress". Then the therapist must "find ways to communicate this insight to the patient".

The problem that Yalom seeks to address is that of seemingly passive patients, with therapists shouldering the entire burden of the therapy because they think that that is what they must do. A "sluggish" patient can be "galvaniz[ed] into action" by asking the simple question: "Why do you come?". Other techniques including scenarios where other people assume responsibility, and drawing a parallel between those scenarios and the patient's own.

In detail, techniques involve:

- Highlighting ways in which the client avoids responsibility, such as by using "cannot" for situations where "will not" is the case, and generates defences against the assumption of responsibility. This also involves confronting a client with the client's own behaviours. A client that, for example, complains of loneliness is reminded of this—"Is it any wonder that you are lonely?"—whenever the client belittles other people.
- Highlighting responsibility avoidance even in the therapist-client relationship itself, by observing any transfer of responsibility from the client to the therapist ("Tell me what to do!") and behaviours of the client towards the therapist that reflect responsibility avoidance in the client's life.
- Encouraging the assumption of responsibility for how the client deals with adverse external circumstances, such as serious illness and the client assuming responsibility for behaviour towards doctors.
- Encouraging the conversion of guilt about lack of self-actualization into assuming more responsibility for that lack.
- Confronting low affect, and encouraging the client to have desires and wishes for change, which become the seeds for a will to change, the mere wish to change being the first step towards that.
- Ungluing decision making processes stuck through fear, encouraging empowerment and the exercise of choice.

Assumption of responsibility does not by itself motivate behavioural change. It must be accompanied by a will to change.

== See also ==
- List of counseling topics
