= Giannis Tsoumarakis =

Greek actor

- Γιάννης Τσουμαράκης
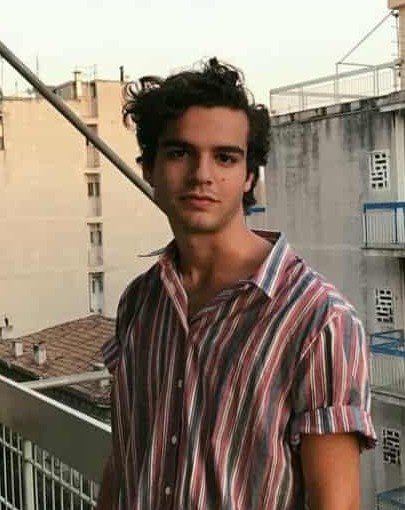
- Tsoumarakis in 2019
- Born: 7 July 2000; Athens, Greece
- Occupation: Actor
- Awards: Dimitris Horn Award, 2025

Giannis Tsoumarakis (Greek: Γιάννης Τσουμαράκης; born on 7 July 2000) is a Greek actor.

Giannis Tsoumarakis was born and raised in Athens on July 7, 2000. He graduated from the Gerakas Art School and was admitted to the Drama School of the National Theatre, from which he graduated in 2021 with honors. He studies Philology at the National and Kapodistrian University of Athens, knows the accordion, piano and speaks English and French.

Examples of his work in the theater include the performances "Antonio or the Message" by Loula Anagnostaki, "in the Stomach of Simone Soul", Billy Elliot the Musical (2015), Romeo and Juliet (2016), Blue Train (2024), The Provocateurs (2022) and "The Tape". He participated in the series The Durrells (2016), At 4 (2023), The Witch (2023) and "I Have Children" (2024–2025) and in the film Shared Balcony (2019).

In May 2025, he was awarded the "Dimitris Horn" theater award.

In June 2025, he participated in the chorus of Sophocles' "Antigone" which was staged in Epidaurus, directed by Ulrich Rasche.

== Sources ==
- "Γιάννης Τσουμαράκης" (in Greek). Greek National Theatre. 28 December 2022.
