= Jamie Elman =

American-Canadian actor (born 1976/77)

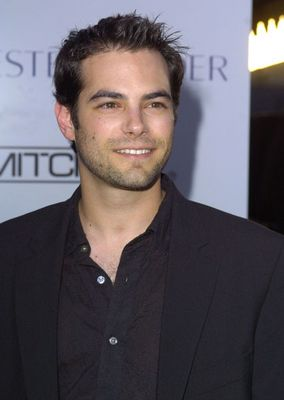
- Elman at the 2004 Movieline Young Hollywood Awards
- Born: 1976 or 1977 (age 49–50); New York City, New York, U.S.
- Education: McGill University (BA)
- Occupation: Actor
- Years active: 1993–present

Jamie Elman (born 1976 or 1977) is a Canadian-American actor, best known for his leading roles of Cody Miller on YTV's Student Bodies, Luke Foley in NBC's American Dreams, and himself in Yidlife Crisis.

== Life and career ==
Elman was born in New York City, and was raised in Montreal, Quebec. He attended Jewish day school in Montreal and has taught fourth-graders at a synagogue religious school in Southern California.

In Montreal, Elman began performing in plays such as The Children's Hour and Annie Get Your Gun before landing his first roles in TV (Are You Afraid of the Dark?) and film (Johnny Mnemonic). Elman graduated from McGill University with a BA in English.

He was part of the ensemble cast of the film Shattered Glass opposite Hayden Christensen and Peter Sarsgaard, and has guest-starred on numerous popular series including Crossing Jordan, Criminal Minds, Without a Trace, CSI: NY and The Closer. Recent roles include starring opposite Armand Assante in California Dreaming which won the Un Certain Regard award at the 2007 Cannes Film Festival; portraying a young Sigmund Freud, again opposite Assante and Ben Cross, in When Nietzsche Wept; and on the small screen, where he improvised with Larry David in HBO's Curb Your Enthusiasm.

In 2009, Elman began work on his first webseries titled Brainstorm for Dailymotion. In April 2010, Elman appeared on the soap opera The Young and the Restless as Jamie Peterson.

Elman and Eli Batalion direct and act in YidLife Crisis, a series of short comedy sketches about two 30-something Jewish friends. Most of the dialog is in Yiddish, which the two use as a secret language, but subtitles are provided in English and French. The duo performed at Montreal's Segal Centre for Performing Arts for a week in January 2022.

== Filmography ==
=== Film ===
Year	Title	Role	Notes
1995	Johnny Mnemonic	Toad	
2000	Stardom		
2001	Girl's Best Friend	Lucas White	
2001	Rave Macbeth	Troy	
2003	Shattered Glass	Aaron Bluth	
2005	Mystery Woman: Game Time	Randy Lawrence	TV movie
2007	California Dreamin'	Sg. David McLaren	
2007	Waking Dreams	Colin	
2007	When Nietzsche Wept	Sigmund Freud	
2008	Squeegees	Dmiti	TV movie
2010	Crazy/Sexy/Awkward	Ben Hoffman	Short movie
2010	The Scientist	David Williams	
2010	Here and Now	Sam Walters	Short movie
2011	The Chicago 8	John Froines	
2012	Crisis Point	Adam Wills	TV movie
2012	A Night at the Office	Henry	Short movie
2012	Wreck-It Ralph	Rancis Fluggerbutter	Voice
2013	Saving Lincoln	General George McClellan	
2013	Random Encounters	Zack Steiner	
2014	Bomb Girls: Facing the Enemy	Jakob	TV movie
2014	YidLife Crisis	Chaimie	Short movie
2017	The Thin Line	Robert Seethis	
2018	Ralph Breaks the Internet	Rancis Fluggerbutter	Voice

=== Television ===
Year	Title	Role	Notes
1992–1993	Are You Afraid of the Dark?	Friend / Student	2 episodes, uncredited
1996	My Hometown	Dennis Thompson	
1997–2000	Student Bodies	Cody Anthony Miller	65 episodes
1999	Undressed	Colin	
2002–2005	American Dreams	Luke Foley	26 episodes
2003	See Jane Date	Larry Fishtail	
2003	Without a Trace	Alex Durphy	Episode: "Sons and Daughters"
2005	The Closer	Dennis Burke	Episode: "Standards and Practices"
2005	CSI: NY	Adam Sorenson	Episode: "Summer in the City"
2006	Criminal Minds	Kenneth Roberts	Episode: "Empty Planet"
2007	What About Brian	Max	Episode: "What About Finding Your Place..."
2007	Crossing Jordan	Jonathan	Episode: "D.O.A."
2007	The Business	The Writer	Episode: "Field Trip to Hollywood: Part 2"
2007	Curb Your Enthusiasm	Jamie the Bartender	Episode: "The Freak Book"
2009	Mad Men	Howard Mann	Episode: "Out of Town"
2009	Brainstorm	Ben Speilman	8 episodes
2010	The Young and the Restless	Jamie Peterson	
2010	NCIS	Realtor	Episode: "Royals & Loyals"
2012	House	Dr. Peter Treiber	Episode: "Post Mortem"
2012	Rizzoli & Isles	Dan Hargrove	Episode: "Throwing Down the Gauntlet"
2012	Covert Affairs	John Dexter	Episode: "Scary Monsters (and Super Creeps)"
2014–2018	Yidlife Crisis	Chaimie	Nominated – Canadian Screen Award for Best Performance by an Actor in a Program or Series Produced for Digital Media (2017)

=== Video games ===
Year	Title	Role	Notes
2011	Star Wars: The Old Republic	Theran Cedrax	
2013	Star Wars: The Old Republic - Rise of the Hutt Cartel	Tharan Cedrax (voice)	
2014	Star Wars: The Old Republic - Shadow of Revan	Tharan Cedrax (voice)	
