= Yidlife Crisis =

Canadian comedy web series

- Genre: Comedy
- Created by: Jamie Elman; Eli Batalion
- Starring: Jamie Elman; Eli Batalion
- Country of origin: Canada
- Original language: English

Production
- Camera setup: single-camera

Original release
- Network: YouTube
- Release: 2014

Yidlife Crisis is a Canadian webTV comedy series starring Jamie Elman and Eli Batalion and launched in 2014.

== Background ==
The comedians of the show grew up together and studied Yiddish at Bialik High School in Côte Saint-Luc in the suburbs of Montreal. Eli Batalion's elders spoke Yiddish at home.

The show launched on YouTube in September 2014. The duo decided to make this show in a move to do something related to their Judaism. In April 2022, the show premiered its first episode in French. In 2023, the duo announced they were working on a show that explores the Arab–Israeli conflict.

== Description ==
Yidlife crisis consists of short comedy sketches about two 30-something Jewish friends. Most of the dialog is in Yiddish, which the two use as a secret language, but subtitles are provided in English and French. The show evolves around the 21st century Jewish culture, and sometimes tackles topics such as antisemitism, Jewish food, Christmas versus Hanukkah or marijuana with a typical Yiddish satire. The comedians were directly inspired by the sitcom Seinfeld.

The slogan of the show is "Sex, Drugs, and Milk & Meat. In Yiddish". The series is humorously rated Chai (18 and over) and gathered 200,000 views on YouTube for its first season. Originally, Jamie Elman does not speak Yiddish (he speaks Hebrew), but he learned the phonetics in four days to act as if he did.

== Characters ==
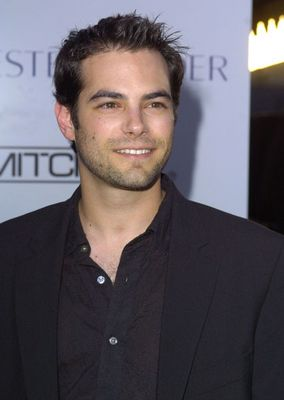
Jamie Elman

- Chaimi (Jamie Elman)
- Leyzer (Eli Batalion)

Mayim Bialik featured in one episode.

== Live performance ==
A live Yidlife crisis show was performed at Montreal's Segal Centre for Performing Arts for a week in January 2022 in front of an empty audience and broadcast online due to pandemic restrictions. The duo also performed in Krakow, Tel Aviv, Toronto, Montreal, Los Angeles and Birmingham (England).

== Awards ==
- 2015: Best comedy series at Toronto's WebFest
- 2016: Canadian Screen Award nomination
- 2016: Recipients of the Natan Fund ($40,000)

== See also ==
- Jewish humor
