= Josef Breuer =

Austrian physician (1842–1925)

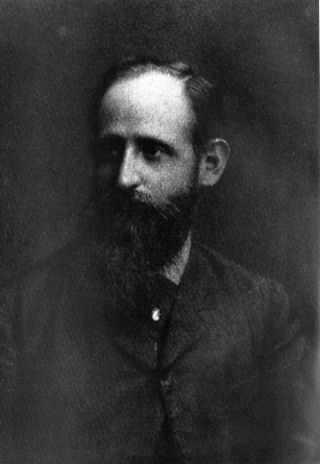
- Born: 15 January 1842; Vienna, Austrian Empire
- Died: 20 June 1925 (aged 83); Vienna, Austria

Education
- Education: University of Vienna

Philosophical work
- School: Psychoanalysis

Josef Breuer (/ˈbrɔɪər/ BROY-ur; Austrian German: [ˈbrɔʏɐ]; 15 January 1842 – 20 June 1925) was an Austrian physician who made discoveries in neurophysiology, and whose work during the 1880s with his patient Bertha Pappenheim, known as Anna O., led to the development of the "cathartic method" (also referred to as the "talking cure") for psychiatric disorders. The method was a major initiatory factor for psychoanalysis, as developed by Breuer's friend and collaborator Sigmund Freud.

== Early life ==
Born in Vienna, his father, Leopold Breuer, taught religion in Vienna's Jewish community. Breuer's mother died when he was quite young, and he was raised by his maternal grandmother and educated by his father until the age of eight. He graduated from the Akademisches Gymnasium of Vienna in 1858 and then studied at the university for one year before enrolling in the medical school of the University of Vienna. He passed his medical examinations in 1867 and went to work as assistant to the internist Johann Oppolzer at the university.

== Neurophysiology ==
Breuer, working for Ewald Hering at the military medical school in Vienna, was the first to demonstrate the role of the vagus nerve in the reflex nature of respiration. This was different from previous physiological belief, and changed the way scientists considered the relationship of the lungs to the nervous system. The mechanism is now known as the Hering–Breuer reflex.

Independent of each other in 1873, Breuer and the physicist and mathematician Ernst Mach discovered how the sense of balance (i.e. the perception of the head's imbalance) functions: that it is managed by information the brain receives from the movement of a fluid in the semicircular canals of the inner ear. That the sense of balance depends on the three semicircular canals was discovered in 1870 by the physiologist Friedrich Goltz, but Goltz did not discover how the balance-sensing apparatus functions.

== Anna O. ==
Breuer is known best perhaps for his work during the 1880s with Anna O. (the case pseudonym of Bertha Pappenheim), a woman suffering from "paralysis of her limbs, and anaesthesias, as well as disturbances of vision and speech". Breuer observed that her symptoms reduced or ended after she described them to him. Anna O. humorously called this procedure chimney sweeping. She also invented the more serious appellation for this form of therapy, talking cure. Breuer later referred to it as the “cathartic method”.

Breuer was then a mentor to the young Sigmund Freud, and had helped establish him in medical practice. Ernest Jones recalled, "Freud was greatly interested in hearing of the case of Anna O, which ... made a deep impression on him"; and in his work of 1909, Five Lectures on Psycho-Analysis, Freud stated, "I was a student and working for my final examinations at the time when ... Breuer, first (in 1880-2) made use of this procedure ... Never before had anyone removed a hysterical symptom by such a method."

Freud and Breuer documented their discussions of Anna O. and other case studies in their 1895 book, Studies in Hysteria. These discussions of Breuer's treatment of Anna O. became "a formative basis of psychoanalytic practice, especially the importance of fantasies (in extreme cases, hallucinations), hysteria [...], and the concept and method of catharsis which were Breuer's major contributions". Louis Breger has observed that in the Studies, "Freud is looking for a grand theory that will make him famous and, because of this, he is always fastening on what he thinks will be a single cause of hysteria, such as sexual conflict...Breuer, on the other hand, writes about the many factors that produce symptoms, including traumas of a variety of kinds. He also gives others, such as Pierre Janet, credit and argues for “eclecticism”; he is open to many different ways of understanding and treating hysteria."

The two men became increasingly estranged. From a Freudian consideration, "while Breuer, with his intelligent and amorous patient Anna O., had unwittingly laid the groundwork for psychoanalysis, it was Freud who drew the consequences from Breuer's case". However, Breger notes that Breuer, while he valued Freud's contributions, didn't agree that sexual issues were the only cause of neurotic symptoms; he wrote in a 1907 letter to a colleague that “Freud is a man given to absolute and exclusive formulations: this is a psychical need which, in my opinion, leads to excessive generalization”. Freud later became hostile to Breuer, no longer giving him credit and helping spread a rumour that Breuer had been unable to manage erotic attention from Anna O. and had abandoned her case, though research indicates this never happened and Breuer remained involved with her case for several years while she remained unwell.

In 1894 Breuer was elected a Corresponding Member of the Vienna Academy of Sciences.

== Family ==
Breuer married Mathilde Altmann in 1868, and they had five children. His daughter Dora later committed suicide rather than be deported by the Nazis. Another one of his daughters, Margarete Schiff, perished in the ghetto of Theresienstadt on September 9, 1942. Breuer's granddaughter, Hanna Schiff, died while imprisoned by the Nazis.

== Works ==
- Zwei Fälle von Hydrophobie. In: Wiener medizinische Wochenschrift 18 (1868). Sp. 178 f., 210-213.
- Das Verhalten der Eigenwärme in Krankheiten. In: Wiener medizinische Wochenschrift 18 (1868). Sp. 982-985, 998-1002.
- Die Selbststeuerung der Athmung durch den Nervus vagus. In: Sitzungsberichte der Akademie der Wissenschaften Wien, math.-naturw. Kl. 58/2 (1868), S. 909-937.
- Bemerkungen zu Senator's „Beiträge zur Lehre von der Eigenwärme und dem Fieber“. In: Arch. path. Anat., Berlin 46 (1969), S. 391 f.
- Über Bogengänge des Labyrinths. In: Allg. Wien. med. Ztg. 18 (1873), S. 598, 606.
- Über die Function der Bogengänge des Ohrlabyrinthes. In: Med. Jb., Wien 1874. S. 72-124.
- Zur Lehre vom statischen Sinne (Gleichgewichtsorgan). Vorläufige Mittheilung. In: Anz. Ges. Ärzte, Wien 1873. Nr. 9 (17. Dezember 1873), S. 31-33.
- Beiträge zur Lehre vom statischen Sinne (Gleichgewichtsorgan, Vestibularapparat des Ohrlabyrinths). Zweite Mittheilung. In: Med. Jb., Wien 1875. S. 87-156.
- Neue Versuche an den Ohrbogengängen. In: Arch. Physiol. 44 (1889), S. 135-152.
- Über die Funktion der Otolithen-Apparate. In: Arch. Physiol. 48 (1891), S. 195-306.
- Über Brommastitis. In: Wien. med. Presse 35 (1894), Sp. 1028.
- Über Bogengänge und Raumsinn. In: Arch. Physiol. 68 (1897), S. 596-648.
- Die Krisis des Darwinismus und die Teleologie. Vortrag, gehalten am 2. Mai 1902. In: Vorträge und Besprechungen. (1902), S. 43-64. Nachdruck der Ausgabe 1902: Edition discord, Tübingen 1986.
- Über Galvanotropismus bei Fischen. In: Zbl. Physiol., Wien 16 (1902), S. 481-483.
- Studien über den Vestibularapparat. In: Sitzungsberichte der Akademie der Wissenschaften Wien, math.-naturw. Kl. 112/3(1903), S. 315-394.
- Über den Galvanotropismus (Galvanotaxis) bei Fischen. In: Sitzungsberichte der Akademie der Wissenschaften Wien, math.-naturw. Kl. 114/3 (1905), S. 27-56.
- Über das Gehörorgan der Vögel. In: Sitzungsberichte der Akademie der Wissenschaften Wien, math.-naturw. Kl. 116/3 (1907), S. 249-292.
- Bemerkungen zu Dr. H. Abels Abhandlung „über Nachempfindungen im Gebiete des kinästhetischen und statischen Sinnes“. In: Zschr. Psychol. Physiol. Sinnesorg. 45 (1907), 1. Abt., S. 78-84.
- Über Ewald's Versuch mit dem pneumatischen Hammer (Bogengangsapparat). In: Zschr. Sinnesphysiol. 42 (1908), S. 373-378.
- Curriculum vitae [1923]. In: Dr. Josef Breuer 1842-1925. Wien o. J. [1927]. S. 9-24.
- Ein telepathisches Dokument. In: Umschau 28 (1924). S. 215 f.
- Josef Breuer / Rudolf Chrobak: Zur Lehre vom Wundfieber. Experimentelle Studie. In: Med. Jb., Wien 22/4 (1867). S. 3-12.
- Josef Breuer / Sigmund Freud: Über den psychischen Mechanismus hysterischer Phänomene. Vorläufige Mittheilung. In: Neurol. Zbl. 12 (1893), S. 4-10, 43-47; zugleich in: Wien. med. Blätter 16 (1893), S. 33-35, 49-51.
- Sigmund Freud / Josef Breuer: Studien über Hysterie. Franz Deuticke, Leipzig + Wien 1895. Neudruck: 6. Auflage. Fischer, Frankfurt a. M. 1991. ISBN 3-596-10446-7
- Josef Breuer / Alois Kreidl: Über die scheinbare Drehung des Gesichtsfeldes während der Einwirkung einer Centrifugalkraft. In: Arch. Physiol. 70 (1898), S. 494-510.
- Marie von Ebner-Eschenbach / Josef Breuer: Ein Briefwechsel. 1889-1916. Bergland-Verlag, Wien 1969

== See also ==
- Hypnoid state
- When Nietzsche Wept
- When Nietzsche Wept (novel)
