= Sharon Farber =

Israeli composer

Sharon Farber (Hebrew: שרון פרבר) is an Israeli composer. She was born in Bat Yam, Israel.

== Early career ==
Farber began her musical career at the age of seven as a classical pianist. After graduating from Thelma-Yelin High School for the Arts, she served in the Israel Defense Forces, and later worked as a theater composer and musical director in Israel. She won the first prize in Colors in Dance in 1992 for her music for choreography. In 1994, she moved to Boston, USA, upon receiving a scholarship from Berklee College of Music. During her studies, she won the first prize in the yearly Professional Writing Division Concert with her first string quartet. After graduating summa cum laude in 1997 (majoring in both classical composition and film scoring), she moved to Los Angeles to begin her professional career. Miss Farber was the recipient of the prestigious Academy of Television Arts and Sciences Internship in Film Scoring, as well as the mentorship program of the Society of Composers and Lyricists, on which she currently serves as a board member. Farber's first professional work in Los Angeles was orchestrating and writing additional music for composer Shirley Walker.

== Film and television music ==
In the film and TV industry, Farber has been working with companies such as NBC (TV series Starting Over and Passions), Showtime (In A Class Of His Own, Call Me Sirr, and WB (Superman & Batman), as well as writing music for independent features and other projects. She won the Telly Award in 1998 for best score for the docu-drama series California 2000 and her work can also be heard at the Museum of Sacramento, as part of the museum's permanent exhibition. Her orchestral score for When Nietzsche Wept was released in October 2008, and she has recently completed the score for Folie a Deux.

== Concert music ==
Farber has been writing concert and choir music in parallel to her film-scoring career, and has many international premieres and performances to her credit. Such performances include The Third Mother/Mothers’ Lament, in memory of slain reporter Daniel Pearl, which was world premiered by the Los Angeles Master Chorale, under the direction of Grant Gershon, and won her the First Prize in the Cincinnati Camerata Composition Competition in 2007. ASHKINA, featuring Omar Faruk Tekbilek, premiered in New York, October 2004, and has had many performances since. Her commissioned piece Translucent Rocks was premiered by the Israeli Chamber Orchestra in October 2007. She was announced Composer in Residence of the 2009 Beverly Hills International Music Festival, and her film music has been featured time and again on "From Stage To Cinema" concerts. Her concerto for cello, orchestra, and narrator has been performed many times and toured the Pacific Northwest with cellist Amit Peled and Maestro Yaniv Attar.

=== Works ===
- Bestemming - For cello, orchestra, and narrator, based on the life of Holocaust survivor and hero of the Dutch resistance, Curt Lowens. Premiered at SABAN Theater in Los Angeles, 2014. Commissioned by the Glendale Philharmonic and cellist Ruslan Buryikov.
- Children of Lights - commissioned and premiered by the National Children's Chorus.
- Mothers’ Lament/ The Third Mother - A Capella work, which was world premiered by the Los Angeles Master Chorale on their Opening Season Concert, September 2002, at the Dorothy Chandler Pavilion, Los Angeles. Published by Roger Dean Music Publishing.
- My Beloved - Commission for a new work for women’s choir and chamber ensemble, premiered in Israel, December 2004.
- From Stage to Cinema concert #1 & 2 - Featured composer at a concert series of Film Music arranged for Oboe Quartet, with Tom Boyd, Oboe, and Marcelo Secena, piano
- Israel Chamber Orchestra commission: "Translucent Rocks", which opened up the 2007-20088 Orchestra’s Season, October 2007
- Piano Ballad - Commissioned by pianist Hagai Yodan. Premiered in Israel, June 2007
- To Always Remember - A song cycle for Soprano & piano, premiered 2005 in Berlin, Germany, and had its Los Angeles soprano and Chamber Ensemble version premier May 29, 2007.
- Foundation for Universal Sacred Music - Commission for a Chamber orchestra and Choir work, premiered in New York, October 2004, with repeated performances in NY and Boston
- Keshet Chaim (Rainbow of Life) Dance Ensemble - Composed and produced music for the ensemble’s event
- The Jewish Symphony Orchestra - Commission to compose a new work for the orchestra. Premiered at the "Women Composers Concert", 2004, Los Angeles
- Time - A song cycle for Soprano & piano, premiered in May 2004 in Beverly Hills, California

== Filmography ==
- California 2000 (1996-2000, docudrama series)
- The Golden - State Museum Project (1997)
- Meaner Than Sin (1997)
- Alien Episode (1997)
- Silicon Towers (1998)
- The Cowboy and the Movie Star (1998)
- Superman (1998-1999, animated series)
- No Regrets (1999)
- Paulie Charmed The Sleeping Woman (1999)
- The Yup - Yup Man (1999)
- Starting Over (1999)
- In a Class of His Own (1999)
- Call Me Sirr (2000)
- The Brother's Grim (2001)
- Runnin’ at Midnite (2002)
- Final Draft (2003)
- Father's Day (2004)
- Passions ( 2004)
- Starting Over (2004-2006)
- When Nietzsche Wept (2007)
- In Twilight's Shadow (2007)
- Folie a Deux (2008)
