= Lebensrückblick =

1951 book by Lou Andreas-Salomé

Lebensrückblick (English: Life Review) is an autobiographical text written by Lou Andreas-Salomé and compiled by Ernst Pfeiffer, who edited and published Andreas-Salomé's literary remains in 1951, some 15 years after her death.

The book recounts her many memories of intellectual and relational encounters with prominent figures such as poet Rainer Maria Rilke (Chapter Seven, entitled "Mit Rainer," or "With Rainer") and psychoanalyst Sigmund Freud (Chapter Eight, entitled "Das Erlebnis Freud," or "The Freud Experience"). The book was translated into English by Breon Mitchell in 1995, yet remains less well-known than Andreas-Salomé's other translated memoir, You Alone Are Real to Me: Remembering Rainer Maria Rilke.
