= Manny Farber =

American painter, film critic and writer

- Born: Emanuel Farber; February 20, 1917; Douglas, Arizona, U.S.
- Died: August 18, 2008 (aged 91); Leucadia, Encinitas, California, U.S.
- Occupations: Painter; film critic
- Spouses: Patricia Patterson (1976–2008); Marsha Picker (1950-1965); Janet Terrace (1938-1946)

Emanuel Farber (February 20, 1917 – August 18, 2008) was an American painter, film critic and writer. Often described as "iconoclastic", Farber developed a distinctive prose style and set of theoretical stances which have had a large influence on later generations of film critics and influence on underground culture. Susan Sontag considered him to be "the liveliest, smartest, most original film critic this country has ever produced."

Farber's writing was distinguished by its "visceral," punchy style and inventive approach towards language; amongst other things, he is credited with coining the term "underground film" in 1957, and was an early advocate of such filmmakers as Howard Hawks, Rainer Werner Fassbinder, Werner Herzog, William Wellman, Raoul Walsh, Anthony Mann, Michael Snow, Chantal Akerman, George Kuchar, Nicolas Roeg, Samuel Fuller and Andy Warhol.

Farber's painting, which was often influenced by his favorite filmmakers, is held in equally high regard; he was dubbed the greatest still life painter of his generation by The New York Times.

== Early life ==
Emanuel Farber was born in Douglas, Arizona, where his father, from Vilna, Lithuania, owned a dry goods store, as the youngest of three brothers. His two older siblings, David and Leslie H. Farber, both became psychiatrists.

After Farber's family moved to Vallejo, California in 1932, Farber enrolled at UC Berkeley for his first-year, before transferring to Stanford University. While at Berkeley, he covered sports at The Daily Californian. At Stanford, he began taking drawing classes. He later enrolled at the California School of Fine Arts, and then to the Rudolph Schaeffer School of Design, both located in San Francisco.

== Career ==
In the early 1930s, Farber worked as a painter and carpenter, in San Francisco. During this time, he attempted to join the Communist Party, though later in his life Farber was often critical of post-New Deal liberal politics.

In 1939, Farber moved to Washington DC with his first wife, Janet Terrace.

Farber, for decades, while also writing and painting, supported himself, as a carpenter, as a member of the Brotherhood of Carpenters and Joiners, working on big construction jobs on the East Coast, eventually quitting because it interfered with painting.

His journalistic career began as an art critic, and in 1942 he moved to New York City. Inspired by Otis Ferguson's writings, Farber took a post as a film and art critic for The New Republic (early 1940s through late 1940s). This was followed by stints at Time (1949), The Nation (1949–1954), New Leader (1958–59), Cavalier (1966) and Artforum (1967–71). He also contributed to Commentary, Film Culture, Film Comment, and Francis Ford Coppola's City Magazine.

In 1970, Farber left New York City to teach and to join the faculty of department of visual arts at the University of California, San Diego. Reportedly, Farber traded his Manhattan loft to artist Don Lewallen in exchange for Lewallen's teaching position at UCSD after the two met at a party. Once in San Diego, he focused on painting and teaching. During his time at UCSD, his faculty colleagues were Newton Harrison, Harold Cohen, Amy Goldin, and David Antin.

All of his film criticism from 1975, until the last published piece in 1977, was co-signed by his wife, Patricia Patterson, and their work has been published primarily in City Magazine and Film Comment.

Originally an art professor only, Farber was approached about teaching a film class because of his background as a critic. He taught several courses, including "History of Film" and "Films in Social Context," which became famous for his unusual teaching style: he usually showed films only in disconnected pieces, sometimes running them backwards or adding in slides and sketches on the blackboard to illustrate his ideas. His exams had a reputation for being demanding and complicated, and occasionally required students to draw storyboards of scenes from memory.

== Style ==
"Manny Farber is the Raymond Chandler of American film criticism."

"Farber’s style was drolly impatient, culturally far-reaching, and addictively conversational. In it, the reader sensed a mind that loved film-going enough to hold filmmakers accountable for their efforts with the same elevated combination of annoyance and appreciation formerly only accorded to playwrights, classical and jazz musicians, and fine artists."

Farber's writing is well known for its distinctive prose style, which he personally described as "a struggle to remain faithful to the transitory, multisuggestive complication of a movie image." He cited the sportswriters of his era as an influence, and frequently used sports metaphors, especially ones related to baseball, in his writings on art and cinema.

Farber frequently championed genre filmmakers like Howard Hawks, Anthony Mann and Raoul Walsh; however, despite his fondness for B-films, Farber was often critical of film noir.

== "White Elephant Art vs. Termite Art" ==
One of Farber's best-known essays is "White Elephant Art vs. Termite Art", which originally appeared in Film Culture, number 27 (Winter 1962–63). In it, he writes on the virtues of "termite art" and the excesses of "white elephant art" and champions the B film and under-appreciated auteurs, which he felt were able, termite-like, to burrow into a topic. Bloated, pretentious, white elephant art lacks the economy of expression found in the greatest works of termite art, according to Farber. Farber saw termite art as spontaneous and subversive, going in bold new directions, and white elephant art as formal and tradition-bound. He offers John Wayne's performance in The Man Who Shot Liberty Valance as a quintessential example of cinematic termite art, but scorns the films of Truffaut and Antonioni.

"Termite-tapeworm-fungus-moss art," Farber contends, "goes always forward eating its own boundaries, and, like as not, leaves nothing in its path other than the signs of eager, industrious, unkempt activity."

== Personal life ==
Farber met his third wife, Patricia Patterson, in New York, in 1966, where Farber had lived since 1942, when he began writing about movies.

Farber retired from teaching in 1987, at age 70. Towards the end of his life, he found it difficult to paint, and instead focused on collages and drawings; his final exhibition of new work occurred just a month before his death.

He died at his home in Leucadia, Encinitas, California, on August 18, 2008. He was survived by Patterson, a daughter from a previous marriage, and a grandson.

"...Manny, who has died aged 91, was tall, lanky and comic looking. He might have played Popeye, or one of those old-timers in the Anthony Mann westerns he cherished. He wore jeans and plaid shirts and the hair had gone back from his great dome of a forehead by the time I met him."

== Reputation and influence ==
"Pauline Kael.. the best movie critic in America. I also respect Andrew Sarris, Manny Farber, Dwight Macdonald and Stephen Farber." — Roger Ebert

Farber is frequently named as one of the greatest film critics, and his work has had a lasting impact on the generations of critics that followed him.

An appearance by Manny Farber at the San Francisco Film Festival is shown in the documentary, For the Love of Movies: The Story of American Film Criticism, in which he is called "criticism's supreme stylist" and his unusual use of language is discussed by The Nation critic Stuart Klawans.

== Works ==
- Farber, Manny (February 2, 2016). Farber on Film: The Complete Film Writings of Manny Farber: A Library of America Special Publication. Library of America. ISBN 978-1-59853-470-2.
- Farber, Manny (2003). Manny Farber: About Face. Museum of Contemporary Art San Diego. ISBN 978-0-934418-63-8.
- Farber, Manny (1998). Negative Space: Manny Farber on the Movies, Expanded Edition. New York: Da Capo Press. ISBN 0-306-80829-3.

Originally released by Praeger Publishers in 1971.

- Farber, Manny (1957). "Underground Films". Commentary.

== Awards ==
- Guggenheim Fellowship (1967 and 1978–79)
- National Endowment for the Humanities Fellowship for Independent Study (1977–78)
- National Endowment for the Arts Grant (1971)
- Graybar Fellowship (1967)

== Tributes ==
- Hudson, David (August 18, 2008). "Manny Farber, 1917 - 2008". GreenCine Daily. Archived from the original on July 18, 2009.
- Sklar, Robert (Spring 2009). "In Memoriam: Manny Farber, 1917-2008". Cinema Journal. 48 (3): 66–69. doi:10.1353/cj.0.0102. — Cover story for the Spring issue. Sklar praises Farber's writing and his view that "movies weren't movies anymore" but regrets that "over time his viewpoint proved unworkable as an effective career strategy."
- "Manny Farber". visarts.ucsd.edu.
- "Manny Farber (1917—2008)". rouge (12). 2008.
- Hoberman, J. (August 19, 2008). "Manny Farber 1917-2008". The Village Voice. Archived from the original on October 7, 2025.
