= Dimitris Horn Award =

Greek theatre award

Dimitris Horn Award is a Greek annual, honorary award and is given for the best performance by a young male actor in the past theatre season. The award, which bears the name of Dimitris Horn, an actor recognised as the best contemporary Greek theatre actor, was established in 2000 by Stamatis Fasoulis and Theodosis Isaakidis, with the financial support of Yannis Horn, the actor's brother.
The prize of the award is the gold cross worn by the actor, which is passed from one awardee to another every year, accompanied by a cash prize of 3000 euro. Candidates must be graduates of a drama school or have performed professionally for the first time no more than five years before the theatre period for which they are honoured.

...these awards are not a simple process. We follow the actors' progress over time and their attitude towards things, towards the theatre, an art form that is primarily handmade. There are many good actors out there, but in order not to be unfair to anyone, the awards are not given for the hit of the moment, but because there has been struggle and dedication. Then the award makes sense.

The award ceremony takes place every year at the "Dimitris Horn Theatre" (formerly "Dionysia Theatre"). The "Committee of the Dimitris Horn Award" is currently composed of: Stamatis Fassoulis (chairman), Lydia Koniordou, theatrologist Irini Moudraki and the journalists Myrto Loverdou and Antigoni Karali as members. Members of the committee have been the theatrologist Kostas Georgousopoulos (chairman), Eleni Chatziargyri and Xenia Kalogeropoulou.

The gradual reduction of the trust fund that financed the award led the Ministry of Culture to take over its funding. With a draft law prepared by the Ministry, which has not yet become state law, the award will become state-sponsored, and the five-member committee evaluating nominations will be appointed by decision of the Minister of Culture.

== Recipients ==
Theater season	Recipient	Play	Role	Production	Refs / Notes
1999 - 2000	Dimitris Imellos	The Illusion (play)	Matamore	Theatre Company "Dolihos"	
2000 - 2001	Argyris Xafis	The Turn of the Screw (play)	The Man	Neos Kosmos Theater	
2001 - 2002	Christos Loulis	Erotokritos	Erotokritos	DipetheK (Μunicipal Regional Theater of Crete)	
2002- 2003	Kostas Vasardanis	Translations (play)	Manus	"Aplo" Theater	
2003 - 2004	Nikos Kardonis	"The one that doesn't end: Greek poetry of the 20th century - Edition II"	dramatized poems	Experimental stage of National Theater of Greece	^{d}
2004 - 2005	Kostas Gakis	"Η κατασαρίδα" (transl. "The cockroach")	he performed 16 different roles	Neos Kosmos Theater	
2005 - 2006	Giannos Perlegas	"Το γάλα" (transl. "The milk")	Adonis	National Theater of Greece	
2006 - 2007	Thanasis Alevras	"Ήρωες" (transl. "Heroes")	Natalia Alexeievna Bratuska Simeonidis	Athens Theater Company	
2007 - 2008	Makis Papadimitriou	"Motortown"	Lee	Neos Kosmos Theater	
2008 - 2009	Mixalis Oikonomou	"Masked (play)	Daoud	Neos Kosmos Theatre	
2009 - 2010	Thanasis Tokakis	Twelfth Night	Sir Andrew Aguecheek	"Elliniki Theamaton"	
2010 - 2011	Dimitris Lalos	La Chunga (play)	Hosefino	"NAMA" group	^{c}
2011 - 2012	Haris Fragoulis	When Nietzsche Wept (novel)	Sigmund Freud	"Thiseion, a theatre for the Arts"	adaptation from the novel
2012 - 2013	Giorgos Hrisostomou	Mistero Buffo	The fool	"Thiseion, a theatre for the Arts"	
2013 - 2014	Michalis Sarantis	"Flantro" (transl. "Flantro"); Hippolytus (play)	Notis Serdaris; Messenger	"National Theater of Greece"	
2014 - 2015	Argyris Pantazaras	King Lear	the fool	Athens Epidaurus Festival	
2015 - 2016	Konstantinos Bibis	"Το δέντρο του Οιδίποδα" (transl. "The Oedipus Tree")	Oedipus	"Thiseion, a theatre for the Arts"	
2016 - 2017	Yiannis Niarros	"Στέλλα κοιμήσου" (transl. "Sleep Stella")	Giorgos Gerakaris	"National Theatre of Greece"	
2017 - 2018	Michalis Syriopoulos	Candide "Η πόλη" (tranls. "The city")	Candide; Kimonas	"Porta" Theater "Athens Epidaurus Festival"	
2018 - 2019	Giorgos Tsouris	"170 τετραγωνικά (Moonwalk)" (transl. "170 square meters (Moonwalk)")	Grigoris	Theater company "Ma Non Troppo"	
2019 - 2020 and 2020 - 2021 ^{b}	Anastasis Roilos	"The Glass Menagerie"	Jim O'Connor	National Theater of Greece	^{a}
2021 - 2022	Fotis Stratigos	"Cost of Living (play)"	John	"Porta" Theater	^{a}
2022 - 2023	Dimitris Kapouranis	"Tebas Land"	Martin/Federico	Neos Kosmos Theater	^{a}
2023 - 2024	Giannis Tsoumarakis	"Κασέτα" (transl. "Tape")	Yiorgakis	"Stathmos" Theater	

== Note ==
^a Due to the COVID-19 pandemic in Greece the award ceremony was postponed. The awards were given at the 2024 award ceremony

^b Because the 2020 2021 theatre season was not completed due to the pandemic, the nominations of the two seasons (2019 - 2020 and 2020 - 2021) were merged into one.

^c Dimitris Lalos, not a drama school graduate, was awarded after the Committee amended the statute to remove the requirement that recipients must be graduates of a recognized drama school.

^d Nikos Kardonis was nominated for the award three years in a row (2002, 2003, 2004).
