= Existential isolation =

Philosophical concept

Existential isolation is the subjective feeling that every human life experience is essentially unique and can be understood only by themselves, creating a gap between a person and other individuals, as well as the rest of the world. Existential isolation falls under existentialism. It was addressed by Martin Heidegger in his book Being and Time (1927) and further explored by Irvin Yalom in his book Existential Psychotherapy (1980). Yalom defined existential isolation as one of three forms of isolation, the other two being intra- and interpersonal isolation. Unlike the other forms, one cannot overcome existential isolation as the gap that separates individuals existentially can never be closed. While every person can experience existential isolation, not everyone might actually feel existentially isolated. Those who do may feel a weaker connection to other individuals and question their beliefs and understanding of the world as they lack social validation.

Much work in psychology has focused on feelings of social isolation and/or loneliness. Only recently have psychologists begun to explore the concept of existential isolation. Existential isolation is the subjective sense that persons are alone in their experience and that others are unable to understand their perspective. Existential isolation thus occurs when people feel that they have a unique worldview unshared by others. Measured as either a state or trait, empirical studies have shown Existential isolation undermines life meaning and decreases well-being; people scoring high on Existential Isolation report lower levels of need satisfaction, purpose in life, and meaningfulness and increased death-related concerns. There is a positive correlation between existential isolation and anxiety, depression, suicidal ideation, and belief in conspiracy theories.

== Clinical perspective ==
People experiencing existential isolation feel disconnected from others around them, including therapists and friends. They tend to perceive lower levels of social support and are less likely to seek and take treatment. Individuals with existential isolation may have poorer therapy outcomes, are less satisfied with the mental health treatment they receive, and have worse beliefs about the therapist's expertise.

People who experience existential isolation are more likely to partake in suicide ideation, and have greater depression, anxiety, distress, and/or worse experience from therapy. A combination of loneliness and existential isolation results in the greatest risk of depression.

Professionals can bypass existential isolation-related issues by ensuring authenticity in the counselling relationship, engaging in I-sharing, and encouraging active participation in behavioral healthcare.

== Measurement ==
Due to the high subjectivity of existential isolation, it has been a key point for psychological researchers to develop measurements that might indicate individual differences regarding feelings of existential isolation.

=== Existential Isolation Scale (EIS) ===
One method of measurement, the Existential Isolation Scale (EIS), was developed by Helm et al., and Pinel et al., which requires respondents to indicate (on a scale from 1 -10 e.g. 1 = Strongly disagree, 10 = Strongly agree) to which extent they agree or disagree to a set of six survey questions. A participant that scores low on the survey is inclined to feel more existentially isolated while high scores on the survey indicate existential connection. The items on the survey are:

1. I usually feel like people share my outlook on life.
2. I often have the same reactions to things that other people around me do.
3. People around me tend to react to things in our environment the same way I do.
4. People do not often share my perspective. (Reverse scored)
5. Other people usually do not understand my experiences. (Reverse scored)
6. People often have the same "take" or perspective on things that I do.

The survey assesses how much individuals do or do not feel a sense of existential isolation or connection. Scores on this scale predict different psychological and interpersonal outcomes such as causing uncertainty about one's perception of reality or impairing one's sense of belonging. Feelings of existential isolation predict heightened depression, anxiety, and stress.

=== State-Trait Existential Isolation Model (STEIM) ===
A different kind of method, developed by Helm et al., proposes that feelings of existential isolation can be differentiated into being either situational (state existential isolation) or dispositional (trait existential isolation), both thought to be caused by acute and chronic influences.

According to his model, different circumstances, that can be both acute and chronic, can elicit either state existential isolation or trait existential isolation.

State existential isolation can be elicited by acute experiences such as specific events or individual comparisons to other reference groups. Individuals who encounter such situations or events and feel existentially isolated through them, are inclined to reduce such feelings. This can lead to feelings of loneliness or a lower identity with any group associated with said experiences. If the individual is unsuccessful in reducing state existential isolation, or those acute experiences seem to happen regularly, state existential isolation can turn into trait existential isolation.

Trait existential isolation can be elicited by chronic causes such as sociocultural factors or aspects of the socialisation process. It is characterised by an experience, in which individuals feel alone in their experience, as though other do not, or cannot relate to or understand their subjective experience. It can lead to social withdrawal, feelings of hopelessness and resulting chronically depleted needs, lower global in-group identity, and increase of an individual's vulnerability to depression.

== Intra and interpersonal isolation ==
In comparison to intra- and interpersonal isolation, existential isolation is a phenomenon that everyone is affected by, because we all are uniquely alone in our sensory experiences. It doesn't matter how much people try to bond with others, and share thoughts or feelings, their experiences are always unique to them. Intra- and interpersonal isolation are forms of isolation which an individual is able to overcome but individuals who experiences existential isolation are unable to overcome it.

Intrapersonal isolation refers to a phenomenon where persons feel disconnected from themselves concerning one's own psyche. Types of intrapersonal isolation are for example repression or dissociative disorders. Patients suffering from intrapersonal isolation often disconnect their emotions from cognition to avoid despair and distress.

Interpersonal isolation refers to a phenomenon where persons feel disconnected from others and experience a shortage of social contact. This can incorporate absence of meaningful connection with others, such as long-lasting relationships, or complete separations, such as staying alone in a room for several days.

== Contributing factors ==
=== Cultural differences ===
Cultural differences play a role in how individuals experience and cope with existential isolation. One cultural factor that impacts existential isolation is the individualistic versus collectivistic orientation of a society. While collectivist cultures have shown to be less likely to experience existential isolation due to their strong sense of community and social support networks, they are also prone to experience feelings of guilt or shame if they perceive themselves as letting down the group or failing to live up to cultural norms. Individuals from individualistic cultures may be more likely to experience existential isolation due to the lack of social support networks and a focus on individualism.

=== Gender differences ===
A distinction between gender can account for different levels of existential isolation. Men are reported to consistently score higher in existential isolation compared to women. This difference may be mediated by the importance of community values. Women tend to place more importance on communal values than men, which are group-oriented and lead to a feeling of interconnection and interdependence. Men may endorse more in agentic values, which are associated with self-reliance.

Cultural differences can be taken into account. Smaller gender differences were found in collectivistic cultures that place more importance on interdependence overall. The gap was greater for individualistic cultures that emphasise independence.

Gender roles and stereotypes may contribute to gender disparity in Existential Isolation. Whereas women are thought to be nurturing and emotionally sensitive, men often take on the role of the provider and are seen as independent and emotionally distant. The lack of emotional expression may lead to a greater feeling of isolation and sense that their feelings and experiences cannot be understood by others.

=== Attachment style ===
The link between existential isolation and attachment is barely explored. In a meta-study, three studies are compared which present a tendency towards a positive correlation between existential isolation and insecure attachment.

The generally accepted theory to describe attachment is attachment theory, which describes attachment in two dimensions, avoidant and anxious. If both of these variables are low, the attachment style is categorised as secure. If the anxious variable is high, the attachment is categorised as anxiously attached. Attachment described by a high score on the avoidant dimension is, as the name proposes, avoidant attachment.

Together anxious and avoidant attachment are broadly called insecure attachment.

While a positive correlation between existential isolation and insecure attachment was found, there is a stronger correlation between existential isolation and avoidant attachment, whereas anxious attachment is closer related to loneliness. The correlation between existential isolation and insecure attachment does not imply a causation from one side or another.

Causality between attachment style and existential isolation is unclear, because attachment is formed in early childhood and therefore not influenced by existential isolation.

=== Stigmatisation ===
Individuals who feel that they do not belong to a social group or community may also experience a greater sense of existential isolation. This includes the population of justice-involved people. Justice involved people are experiencing stigma because they have a history of crime. This has been found to be connected to diminished physical well-being and reduced responsiveness to treatment services concerning improvement of psychosocial functioning.

People who belong to underrepresented communities report higher levels of existential isolation than those people belonging to majority groups.

There is relationship between non normative group memberships, which included race, ethnicity, sexuality, and the experiences of existential isolation. Participants with a non normative group membership, such as lesbians or latinas/latinos reported higher levels of existential isolation.Autistic people are a like cohort.
