= Marilyn Yalom =

American feminist author and historian (1932–2019)

- Born: March 10, 1932; Chicago, Illinois, United States
- Died: November 20, 2019 (aged 87); Palo Alto, California, United States
- Spouse: Irvin Yalom
- Children: 4

Academic background
- Education: Wellesley College, Harvard University, Johns Hopkins University

Academic work
- Discipline: History, Feminism, French studies, Comparative Literature
- Institutions: Stanford University, University of Hawaiʻi, California State University, East Bay

Marilyn Yalom (born Marilyn Koenick; March 10, 1932 – November 20, 2019) was an American feminist author and historian. She was a senior scholar at the Clayman Institute for Gender Research at Stanford University, and a professor of French. She served as the institute's director from 1984 to 1985. Prior to teaching at Stanford, Yalom taught at the University of Hawaiʻi at Mānoa and California State University Hayward (now known as California State University, East Bay).

== Life and work ==
Yalom received her BA in French from Wellesley College in 1954, her MA in French and German from Harvard University in 1956, and her PhD in Comparative Literature from Johns Hopkins University in 1963.

Marilyn Yalom's scholarly publications include Blood Sisters (1993), A History of the Breast (1997), A History of the Wife (2001), Birth of the Chess Queen (2004), The American Resting Place (2008) with photos by Reid Yalom, and How the French Invented Love (2012). Her books have been translated into 20 languages.

In addition to her text, The American Resting Place contains a portfolio of 64 black and white art photos taken by her son Reid Yalom. Marilyn Yalom was presented with a Certificate of Recognition from the California State Assembly "honoring extraordinary leadership in the literary arts and continued commitment to ensuring the quality of reading" via the book The American Resting Place: Four Hundred Years of History, "thereby benefiting the people of the City and County of San Francisco and the State of California."

Her book, How the French Invented Love, was short-listed for the Phi Beta Kappa Gauss literary award and for the American Library in Paris book award, in 2013. Yalom was decorated by the French government as an Officer des Palmes Academiques in 1991, and she received an Alumnae Achievement Award from Wellesley College in 2013.

She was married to the psychiatrist and author Irvin Yalom.

She died on November 20, 2019, from multiple myeloma, a form of cancer that affects the bone marrow.

== Awards and honors ==
- 2013 American Library in Paris Book Award, shortlisted for How the French Invented Love

== Works ==
- Maternity, Mortality, and the Literature of Madness (1985).
- Blood Sisters: The French Revolution in Women's Memory (1993).
- A History of the Breast (1997).
- A History of the Wife (2001).
- Birth of the Chess Queen (2004).
- The American Resting Place: Four Hundred Years of History (2008). ISBN 978-0618624270
- How the French Invented Love (2012).
- The Social Sex: A History of Female Friendship (2015).
- Compelled to Witness: Women's Memoirs of the French Revolution (2015).
- The Amorous Heart: An Unconventional History of Love (2018).
- A Matter of Death and Life with her husband (2021).
