= Existential Psychotherapy (book) =

Book by Irvin D. Yalom

- Author: Irvin D. Yalom
- Language: English
- Subject: Existential psychotherapy
- Publisher: Basic Books
- Publication date: 1980
- Publication place: United States
- Media type: Print (Hardcover)
- Pages: 544
- ISBN: 978-0-465-02147-5
- OCLC: 6580323

Existential Psychotherapy is a book about existential psychotherapy by the American psychiatrist Irvin D. Yalom, in which the author, addressing clinical practitioners, offers a brief and pragmatic introduction to European existential philosophy, as well as to existential approaches to psychotherapy. He presents his four ultimate concerns of life—death, freedom, isolation, and meaninglessness—and discusses developmental changes, psychopathology and psychotherapeutic strategies with regard to these four concerns.

This work is considered to be among Yalom's most influential books, as is his groundbreaking textbook on group therapy The Theory and Practice of Group Psychotherapy (1970).

== Contents ==
=== Introduction ===
In Chapter 1 (Introduction), the author presents three views of the prototype of intrapsychic conflict in the individual: the Freudian view, the neo-Freudian view (as represented by Harry Stack Sullivan, Karen Horney, Erich Fromm), and the existential view. He also offers a short review of the European tradition of existential philosophical thinking (with brief excursions on Søren Kierkegaard, Martin Heidegger and others) as well as existential analytic thought (referring to the presentation in Rollo May's book Existence of 1958), outlining also the American field of humanistic psychology in comparison with the existential tradition in Europe. He points out the influence of European psychoanalysts who emigrated to America as to highlighting particular aspects: the role of the will and of death anxiety (Otto Rank, later built upon by Ernest Becker), the future-oriented motivation of the individual (Horney), fear and freedom (Fromm), and responsibility and isolation (H. Kaiser). Yalom also points out that he frequently refers to works of writers in his book, including Fyodor Dostoyevsky, Leo Tolstoy, Franz Kafka, Jean-Paul Sartre, and Albert Camus.

The further chapters are structured in four parts, each of which is dedicated to one of the four concerns which constitute, in Yalom's approach, the four ultimate concerns rooted in the existence of the individual. These are:

Part I: Death (with Chapters 2–5),
Part II: Freedom (with Chapters 6 and 7),
Part III: Isolation (with Chapters 8 and 9), and
Part IV: Meaninglessness (with Chapters 10 and 11).

It has been noted that Yalom uses the term ultimate concern differently compared to Tillich and Kierkegaard: Yalom speaks of ultimate concerns as "givens of existence" with which the individual is confronted and which form "an inescapable part, of the human being's existence in the world".

In Parts I to IV, the author discusses, for each of these concerns, the changes that occur in the course of the development of the individual, his view on psychopathology in relation to the respective concern, and proposed psychotherapeutic strategies for assisting patients in a crisis.

As other books by Yalom, this book includes descriptions of numerous case studies that illustrate his arguments.

=== Part I: Death ===
In Part I, the author addresses the fear of death and discusses theoretical and empirical findings with regard to the fear of death. He names some philosophers' views, works of literature and examples from clinical practice that assign to death awareness a role in fostering inner changes and personal growth. He offers explanations on its widespread omission in the theory and practice of psychotherapy – in particular also by Sigmund Freud who saw it as a mere disguise for a deeper source of concern. He then discusses the development of the fear of death in children.

He presents two poles of basic defenses against this fear and possible resulting psychopathology: an orientation to personal "specialness" and inviolability, with a tendency to individuation and "life anxiety", versus an orientation to "the ultimate rescuer" with a tendency to fusion and "death anxiety". He outlines individuals' oscillations between these two poles and discusses how a hypertrophy of either of these defenses, or a reaction to a breakdown of either defense, can give rise to disorders (for example schizoid and narcissistic tendencies in the case of an extreme of individuation, or passive-dependent or masochistic tendencies in the case of an extreme of fusion, or depressive symptoms in case of a breakdown of either defense). He points out that individuation co-occurs with psychopathy less often and appears to be a more effective defense compared to fusion.

Yalom sees his notion of "life anxiety" and "death anxiety" as being closely corresponding with May's earlier concept of "fear of life" and "fear of death". Furthermore, he views the dialectic of the poles of "specialness" versus "the ultimate rescuer" as being similar to that of the cognitive styles of field dependence versus field independence and to that of interior versus exterior locus of control.

Quoting the work of Harold Searles on patients with schizophrenia, the author also discusses the special situation in this regard of the schizophrenic patient who, according to Yalom, "clings to his or her denial of death with a fierce desperation".

The author subsequently describes a psychotherapeutic approach based on death awareness. One of the methods he describes is a "disidentification" exercise, in which an individual first notes down answers to the question "Who am I" and then meditates on giving each of these up, one by one.

=== Part II: Freedom ===
In Part II, the author outlines the role of freedom, responsibility and the will. According to Yalom, responsibility means authorship "of one's own self, destiny, life predicament, feelings and, if such be the case, one's own suffering". Responsibility is "a deeply frightening insight". In more illustrative terms, he states:

"To experience existence in this manner is a dizzying sensation. Nothing is as it seemed The very ground beneath one seems to open up. Indeed, groundlessness is a commonly used term for a subjective experience of responsibility awareness. Many existential philosophers have described the anxiety of groundlessness as ″ur-anxiety″—the most fundamental anxiety, an anxiety that cuts deeper even than the anxiety associated with death."

Yalom contends that: "The classical psychoneurotic syndromes have become a rarity. [...] Today's patient has to cope more with freedom than with suppressed drives. [...] the patient has to cope with the problem of choice—what he or she wants to do" and that "at both individual and social level, we engage in a frenetic search to shield ourselves from freedom." Yalom discusses various responsibility-voiding defenses, including: "compulsivity", displacement of responsibility to another, denial of responsibility ("innocent victim", "losing control"), avoidance of autonomous behaviour and decisional pathology.

Yalom recites examples in literature, case studies and therapeutical implications concerning situations in which persons avoid responsibility. He discusses therapeutic approaches to disorders of wishing, willing and deciding, among them Viktor Frankl's paradoxical intention, which he equates with the "symptom prescription" approach in the writings of Don Jackson, Jay Hayley, Milton Erickson and Paul Watzlawick. A further approach he presents is Fritz Perls' approach of asking patients to re-enact a dream and to play the parts of all the objects in the dream drama. He adds however that Perls, although requesting patients to assume responsibility, had a so active and powerful style that he placed patients in a contradictory situation, leading to a double bind. Concerning the therapeutic approach to increase patients' responsibility, he notes that Kaiser's contributions, published 1965 in a book entitled Effective Psychotherapy, stand out for thoughtfulness and consistency. Yalom also refers to best-selling American self-help books that explicitly aim at enhancing the individual's responsibility awareness, but takes a critical stance towards the est-training which claims to improve responsibility and yet is, in his view, itself an authoritarian approach.

He subsequently reviews empirical findings that certain forms of psychopathology, in particular depression, are found to be more likely associated with an external locus of control or, in Martin Seligman's model, with learned helplessness. In this context, he discusses limits of responsibility, yet points out that "when [...] adversity is formidable, still one is responsible for the attitude one adopts toward the adversity—whether to live a life of bitter regret or to find a way to transcend the handicap and to fashion a meaningful life despite it". He also outlines research by O. Carl Simonton and others that go as far as to ascribe an influence of a patient onto the progression of cancer.

Yalom also reflects on "existential guilt", building on the notion of guilt as presented by Heidegger but emphasizing that "one is guilty not only through transgressions against another or against some moral or social code, but one may be guilty of transgression against oneself." He expands on notions such as existential anxiety as seen by the philosopher and theologian Paul Tillich, of the role of anxiety as seen by Rank and of by May. Yalom claims that: "each human being has an innate set of capacities and potentials and, furthermore, has a primordial knowledge of these potentials. One who fails to live as fully as one can, experiences a deep, powerful feeling which I refer to here as "existential guilt"." He cites similar ideas presented in Horney's mature work and in Maslow's work, and concludes that there is a general consensus among Heidegger, Tillich, Maslow and May that existential guilt is a positive constructive force. He cites one example among his patients who experienced existential guilt as regret, which in the course of therapy gave place to a sense of possibility, another example of a patient who experienced existential guilt as self-contempt which later gave place to a sense of choicefulness, to self-confidence and to self-love. He also refers to existential guilt as a recurrent theme in Kafka's work.

In the subsequent chapter, Yalom expands on the will, quoting in particular Hannah Arendt's view of the will as "an organ of the future". He discusses clinical observations on the will made by Rank, Leslie H. Farber, and May.

=== Part III: Isolation ===
In Part III, he addresses three types of isolation: interpersonal isolation (isolation from other individuals, experienced as loneliness), intrapersonal isolation (in which parts of oneself are partitioned off), and existential isolation (an "unbridgeable gulf between oneself and any other being"). He then illustrates "what, in the best of ways, a relationship can be" in terms of need-free love, recalling similar thoughts expressed by Martin Buber (Ich-Du relationship), Abraham Maslow (being-love, a love for the being of another person, in distinction from deficiency-love, a selfish love which relates to others in terms of usefulness) and Fromm (need-less love), and then addresses interpersonal psychopathology. He points out that fusion is a common escape from existential isolation and that this has a high overlap to the "ultimate rescuer" belief. He then addresses therapeutical approaches to understanding interpersonal relationships, in particular also the therapist–patient relationship.

=== Part IV: Meaninglessness ===
In Part IV, the author discusses meaninglessness and its role in psychotherapy. He discusses various answers related to questions around the "meaning of life", distinguishing between "cosmic" and "terrestrial" meaning, and noting that "most Western theological and atheistic existential systems agree [that] it is good and right to immerse oneself in the stream of life", describing hedonism and self-actualization, which have a main focus on the self, and altruism, dedication to a cause, and creativity, which focus more on transcending oneself. He presents in depth Frankl's therapeutic approach, logotherapy, that focusses on the human search for meaning. In terms of clinical research, he speaks of two psychometric instruments designed to measure purpose in life, summarizing criticism and results with regard to the "Purpose–in–Life Test" and briefly mentioning the "Life Regard Index".

Yalom holds that the search for meaning is paradoxical in a similar sense as Frankl sees the search for pleasure to be paradoxical: it cannot be achieved if aimed at directly and must rather be pursued indirectly ("obliquely"). He states that, if a patient reports a lack of meaning in life, it is important for the therapist to first learn whether there are possibly other underlying issues (cultural issues, or issues relating to the concerns of death, freedom, and isolation), and addressing such issues, for example by helping the patient develop curiosity and concern for others within the framework of group therapy. Regarding "pure meaninglessness", Yalom states that the desire to engage life is "always there within the patient"—to engage in satisfying relationships, in social or creative engagement, in satisfying work, in religious or self-transcendent strivings, and other forms of engagement. Therefore, Yalom's proposed therapeutic answer to "pure" meaninglessness is to remove obstacles that prevent the patient from wholehearted engagement. Yalom holds that the therapist's best tool for this is the therapist's own engagement with the patient.

== Influence ==
In his own words, Yalom intended with this book to "demonstrate [..] that the existential approach is a valuable, effective psychotherapeutic paradigm, as rational, as coherent, and as systematic as any other". The book is considered to be among Yalom's most influential books. For example, psychologist Richard Sharf has referred to it as "[p]erhaps the most thorough and comprehensive explanation of existential psychotherapy".

The book, written as "a book for clinicians" and meant to be clinically useful, with "excursions into philosophy" that are "brief and pragmatic", is recognized as having greatly influenced the development of existential thinking and practice among American psychotherapists.
