= Irvin D. Yalom =

American existential psychiatrist (born 1931)

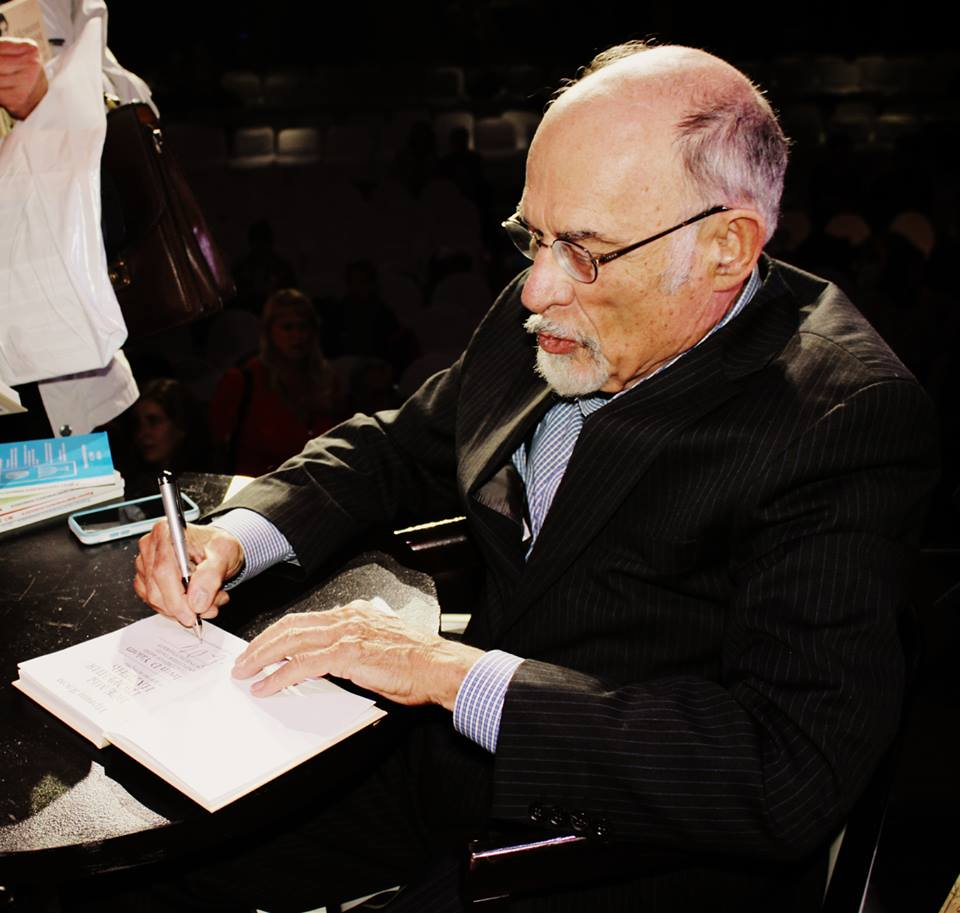
- Yalom in 2014
- Born: Irvin David Yalom; June 13, 1931 (age 95); Washington, D.C., U.S.
- Education: George Washington University (BA); Boston University (MD)
- Known for: Existential isolation; Responsibility assumption
- Spouses: Marilyn Yalom (before 2019) Sakino Sternberg Yalom (m. 2024)
- Children: 4
- Scientific career
- Fields: Psychotherapy, psychiatry
- Workplaces: Stanford University

Irvin David Yalom (/ˈɜːrvɪn ˈjæləm/; born June 13, 1931) is an American existential psychiatrist who is an emeritus professor of psychiatry at Stanford University, as well as author of both fiction and nonfiction.

== Early life and education ==
Yalom was born in Washington, D.C. About fifteen years prior to his birth in the United States, Yalom's Jewish parents emigrated from Belarus and eventually opened a grocery store in Washington DC. Yalom spent much of his childhood reading books in the family home above the grocery store and in a local library. After graduating from high school, he attended George Washington University and then Boston University School of Medicine.

== Career ==
After graduating with a BA from George Washington University in 1952 and a Doctor of Medicine from Boston University School of Medicine in 1956, he went on to complete his internship at Mount Sinai Hospital in New York and his residency at the Phipps Clinic of Johns Hopkins Hospital in Baltimore, where he completed his training in 1960. After two years of Army service at Tripler General Hospital in Honolulu, Yalom began his academic career at Stanford University. He was appointed to the faculty in 1963 and promoted over the following years, being granted tenure in 1968. Soon after this period he made some of his most lasting contributions by teaching about group psychotherapy and developing his model of existential psychotherapy.

Yalom spoke highly of Rollo May, who was his therapist for a while.

His writing on existential psychology centers on what he refers to as the four "givens" of the human condition: isolation, meaninglessness, mortality and freedom, and discusses ways in which the human person can respond to these concerns either in a functional or dysfunctional fashion.

In 1970, Yalom published The Theory and Practice of Group Psychotherapy, speaking about the research literature around group psychotherapy and the social psychology of small group behavior. This work explores how individuals function in a group context, and how each member of group therapy gains from participation in the group.

In addition to his scholarly, non-fiction writing, Yalom has produced a number of novels and also experimented with writing techniques. In Every Day Gets a Little Closer Yalom invited a patient to co-write about the experience of therapy. The book has two distinct voices which are looking at the same experience in alternating sections. Yalom's works have been used as collegiate textbooks and standard reading for psychology students. His new and unique view of the patient/client relationship has been added to curriculum in psychology programs at such schools as John Jay College of Criminal Justice in New York City.

Yalom has continued to maintain a part-time private practice and has authored a number of video documentaries on therapeutic techniques. Yalom is also featured in the 2003 documentary Flight from Death, a film that investigates the relationship of human violence to fear of death, as related to subconscious influences. The Irvin D. Yalom Institute of Psychotherapy, which he co-directs with Professor Ruthellen Josselson, works to advance Yalom's approach to psychotherapy. This unique combination of integrating more philosophy into psychotherapy can be considered as psychosophy.

== Personal life ==
He was married to author and historian Marilyn Yalom, who died on November 20, 2019. They have four children: Eve, a gynecologist; Reid, a photographer; Victor, a psychologist and entrepreneur; and Ben, a theater director. On January 11, 2024, he married Sakino Sternberg, a clinical psychologist in Berlin.

== Awards ==
- 1974: Edward Strecker Award for significant contribution to the field of psychiatry patient by The University Pennsylvania, School of Medicine, Department of Psychiatry
- 1976: Foundation's Fund Award for research in psychiatry by The American Psychiatric Association
- 1977: Fellowship Award by The Center for Advanced Study in the Behavioral Sciences
- 1987: Fellowship Award by The Rockefeller Foundation (Bellagio, Italy)
- 1992: Commonwealth Club Gold Award for fiction best novel (When Nietzsche Wept) by The Commonwealth Club of California
- 2001: Oskar Pfister Award for important contributions to religion and psychiatry by the American Psychiatric Foundation/American Psychiatric Association
- 2009: International Sigmund Freud Award for Psychotherapy of the city of Vienna, Austria by The World Council for Psychotherapy

== Publications ==
=== Fiction and memoir ===
- 1974 Every Day Gets a Little Closer ISBN 0-465-02119-0
- 1989 Love's Executioner and Other Tales of Psychotherapy ISBN 0-465-04280-5
- 1992 When Nietzsche Wept ISBN 0-465-09172-5 (Kindle edition 2019)
- 1996 Lying on the Couch ISBN 0-465-04295-3
- 1999 Momma and the Meaning of Life ISBN 0-749-92038-6
- 2005 The Schopenhauer Cure ISBN 978-0-06-621441-2
- 2005 I'm Calling the Police! A Tale of Regression and Recovery
- 2012 The Spinoza Problem ISBN 0-465-02963-9
- 2015 Creatures of a Day - And Other Tales of Psychotherapy, ISBN 978-0-465-02964-8

=== Nonfiction ===
- 1970 The Theory and Practice of Group Psychotherapy ISBN 0-465-09284-5 (6th edition 2020)
- 1980 Existential Psychotherapy ISBN 0-465-02147-6 (Kindle edition 2020)
- 1983 Inpatient Group Psychotherapy ISBN 0-465-03298-2
- 1996 The Yalom Reader ISBN 0-465-03610-4
- 2001 The Gift of Therapy: An Open Letter to a New Generation of Therapists and Their Patients ISBN 0-066-21440-8
- 2008 Staring at the Sun: Overcoming the Terror of Death ISBN 978-0-7879-9668-0
- 2017 Becoming Myself: A Psychiatrist's Memoir ISBN 0-465-09889-4
- 2021 A Matter of Death and Life, co-written with Marilyn Yalom ISBN 1503613763
- 2024 Hour of the Heart, co-written with Benjamin Yalom ISBN 978-0063321458

== Filmography ==
- 2003 Flight from Death (directed by Patrick Shen, featuring Ron Leifer, Robert Jay Lifton, Merlyn Mowrey and Sheldon Solomon and Irvin D. Yalom)
- 2007 When Nietzsche Wept (directed by Pinchas Perry, featuring Ben Cross, Armand Assante, Katheryn Winnick)
- 2014 Yalom's Cure (directed by Sabine Gisiger)

== Training videos ==
- Irvin Yalom: Live Case Consultation. Psychotherapy.net, 2005.
- Irvin Yalom: Foundations of My Life and Work. Psychotherapy.net, 2006.
- The Gift of Therapy: A Conversation with Irvin Yalom, MD. Psychotherapy.net, 2006.
- Understanding Group Psychotherapy. Psychotherapy.net, 2006.
- The Art of Psychotherapy. Thinking Allowed Productions, 2011.
- Confronting Death and Other Existential Issues in Psychotherapy. Psychotherapy.net, 2011.
- Group Therapy: A Live Demonstration. Psychotherapy.net, 2011.
- Teaching Psychotherapy Through Narrative. Milton H. Erickson Foundation, 2013.
- Irvin Yalom on Psychotherapy and Writing. Psychotherapy.net, 2015.
- Irvin Yalom in Session. Psychotherapy.net, 2017.
- Irvin Yalom on Grief, Loss, and Growing Old. Psychotherapy.net, 2022.
