= The Hero Pattern and the Life of Jesus =

Folklore study applying the hero pattern to the Gospel narratives

- Author: Alan Dundes
- Language: English
- Subject: Folkloristics, Comparative mythology, Biblical studies
- Genre: Nonfiction, essay
- Publication date: 1976
- Publication place: United States
- Media type: Print

The Hero Pattern and the Life of Jesus is a short monograph by American folklorist Alan Dundes that applies comparative hero pattern theory to the canonical Gospels. Published in 1976, the study argues that episodes in the Jesus tradition align with multiple motifs in the cross-cultural hero pattern articulated by Otto Rank and Lord Raglan. Dundes situates the project within folklore method, including motif and pattern analysis, and frames the parallels as interpretive rather than being related or useful for biographical detailing or related to historicity. Dundes states that even if a biographical structure were to align with a hero pattern, it "does not necessarily mean that the hero never existed." Dundes also acknowledges that Raglan's himself admitted that his 22 incidents were arbitrarily chosen. Scholars cite the work in debates about typology, myth theory, and the limits of comparative inference in Gospel studies.

== Synopsis and analysis ==
Dundes presents the hero pattern as a cross-cultural schema for recurring incidents in legendary biographies, then surveys Gospel episodes to test the pattern against the figure of Jesus. He foregrounds classic formulations of the pattern in Rank's The Myth of the Birth of the Hero and Raglan's The Hero, which identify clusters such as unusual birth, threat to the child, exile or hiding, recognition at maturity, public mission, death, and posthumous cult. He argues that the Gospel narratives display many of these incidents, calculating that the life of Jesus scores seventeen out of Raglan's twenty-two points. He emphasizes that this correspondence does not prove or disprove Jesus's existence but rather "suggests that the folk repeatedly insist upon making their versions of the lives of heroes follow the lines of a specific series of incidents."

Dundes emphasizes that "The fact that a hero's biography conforms to the Indo-European hero pattern does not necessarily mean that the hero never existed. It suggests rather that the folk repeatedly insist upon making their versions of the lives of heroes follow the lines of a specific series of incidents. Accordingly, if the life of Jesus conforms in any way with the standard hero pattern, this proves nothing one way or the other with respect to the historicity of Jesus."

Dundes also clarifies that "Raglan himself admitted that his choice of twenty-two incidents (as opposed to some other number of incidents) was arbitrary (Raglan 1956:186)."

The study aligns specific Raglan-style motifs with selected Gospel passages, treating the four Gospels as primary sources for the legend. Dundes applies Raglan's pattern systematically, noting that the life of Jesus conforms fairly well. He interprets the missing motifs, specifically the hero's victory over a king and his marriage to a princess, as a significant deviation that reveals a "male-oriented worldview which denied power to females." He further explores the psychological significance of the pattern, building on Otto Rank's Oedipal interpretation while critiquing Rank's focus on birth symbolism. Dundes argues that the core of the pattern is the son's effort to possess the mother and displace the father, with motifs like the virgin birth and prolonged nursing serving as techniques for denying the father's role.

Dundes maps hero-pattern motifs with episodes from the Gospel narratives:

- Virgin Mother (1), Unusual Conception (4), and Reputed Son of God (5)
  The conception narrative in Matthew 1 and Luke 1–2 directly fulfills these opening motifs of the pattern.
- Attempt to Kill Hero (6) and Being Spirited Away (7)
  Herod's Massacre of the Innocents and the subsequent flight of the Holy Family into Egypt align with the hero's initial persecution and escape.
- Reared by Foster Parents (8)
  Identifies Joseph's role as the foster father who raises the child.
- No Details of Childhood (9)
  Notes that the pattern explains the "lack of information about the youth and growing up of Jesus," a detail that has long puzzled biblical scholars.
- Becomes "King" (13)
  This motif is linked to the mock title of "King of the Jews" (INRI) placed on the cross during the crucifixion.
- Loses Favor (16), Driven from Throne (17), Mysterious Death (18), and Dies Atop a Hill (19)
  The betrayal by Judas, the arrest, and the Crucifixion at Golgotha are interpreted as fulfilling this sequence.
- Body is Not Buried (21) and Has a Holy Sepulcher (22)
  The disappearance of Jesus's body from the tomb and the veneration of the site satisfy the final points of the pattern.

== Reception ==
Folklorist Robert A. Segal praised Dundes's work as a clear demonstration of how hero pattern analysis could be applied to the figure of Jesus, though he, like other commentators, warned that such typological approaches can obscure crucial differences between genres and sources. The biblical scholar Raymond E. Brown recognized the pattern's usefulness, especially for infancy and passion motifs, but cautioned that the four Gospels preserve a range of sometimes-contradictory traditions, making it difficult to impose a single biographical structure. Bart D. Ehrman and other researchers focusing on the historical Jesus argued that identifying narrative similarities through such patterns is not sufficient to resolve debates about Jesus's historicity. Bruce Lincoln and other methodologists in religious studies placed Dundes's analysis in the broader context of twentieth-century debates over typology, structure, and comparative method.

Christopher Hansen observes that The Hero Pattern and the Life of Jesus is used by fringe theorists like proponents of Christ myth theory and observes that when others score the narrative of Jesus using the same hero pattern, they get radically different and inconsistent scoring to the point that it casts doubts on the usefulness of the Raglan scale for historicity such that "it seems prudent to abandon the application of the Raglan hero pattern to Jesus."

=== Legacy ===
Dundes's essay became a common point of reference in folklore and religion courses that survey modern theories of myth and hero narrative. Subsequent handbooks and overviews of myth theory present the hero pattern as one useful, limited model for analyzing recurring narrative incidents, then present cautions about over-generalization and selection bias. New Testament scholarship continues to debate the explanatory reach of cross-cultural typologies, with some authors stressing literary and theological aims in the infancy and passion narratives and others emphasizing the constraints of historical method. Discussions of Jesus in relation to hero patterns often cite Dundes alongside Rank and Raglan, reflecting the study's role in consolidating a comparative framework for evaluating Gospel narratives.
