= OSCL =

OSCL may refer to:

- Organización Socialista del Camino para la Libertad - the Spanish name of Freedom Road Socialist Organization (FRSO)
- Ohio Senior Classical League - the Ohio state chapter of the National Senior Classical League (NSCL);
  also the college-level affiliate of the Ohio Junior Classical League (OJCL)
