= Peter Holliday =

American art historian and author

Peter J. Holliday
- Occupations: Art historian, academic, and author

Academic background
- Education: B.A. M.A. M.Phil. Ph.D.
- Alma mater: Columbia University; Yale University

Academic work
- Institutions: California State University

Peter J. Holliday is an American art historian, academic, and author. He is Emeritus Professor of History of Art and Classical Archaeology at the California State University, Long Beach.

Holliday is most known for his research on the connections between Hellenistic conventions, Etruscan and other Italic artistic traditions, Roman monuments, and cultural practices, as well as the reception and influence of the classical past by later societies. His scholarly contributions include articles and reviews published in Art Bulletin, American Journal of Archaeology, and Memoirs of the American Academy in Rome, as well as edited volumes. His books The Origins of Roman Historical Commemoration in the Visual Arts (2002) and American Arcadia: California and the Classical Tradition (2016) explore how artistic practices are received, adapted, and interpreted by different cultures. Additionally, he has created an interactive map guide to Southern California for classical art audiences.

Holliday has received awards, including fellowships from Samuel H. Kress Foundation, National Endowment for the Humanities, Andrew W. Mellon Foundation, American Academy in Rome, and the Getty Research Institute. He has also participated in committees and juries for the Society of Architectural Historians, the Archaeological Institute of America, and the College Art Association and served on the Board of Directors of the College Art Association's Gay and Lesbian Caucus. Among his significant contributions are a television episode for the Ancient Mysteries series and the exhibition catalog The Fascination with the Past: John Henry Parker’s Photographs of Rome, both of which focus on historical themes and visual representations.

== Education and early career ==
Holliday earned his B.A. in Art History and Archaeology from Columbia University in 1975. He pursued further studies at Yale University, completing his M.A. in 1977 and M.Phil. in 1978. He obtained his Ph.D. in 1983 from Yale.

== Career ==
From 1981 to 1989, Holliday was an assistant professor at the University of Houston and briefly served as a visiting professor at the University of California, Los Angeles, during this time. He joined California State University, San Bernardino, in 1989 as an assistant professor, advancing to associate professor in 1996. He served as a professor at California State University, Long Beach, from 1998 to 2023 and has held the title of emeritus professor since then.

== Scholarship ==
Holliday, a historian of classical art and archaeology, has focused on the connections between Hellenistic conventions, Etruscan and Italic traditions, and Roman monuments. His research has explored how later societies have received, influenced, and constructed the classical past, with particular emphasis on commemorative strategies in the visual arts, collection practices in ancient Rome, and modern interpretations of antiquity. In 1993, he edited and contributed to Narrative and Event in Ancient Art, which examined the intersection of narrative structures and visual representation in ancient monuments, offering a perspective on how these works conveyed historical and cultural events. Ruth Webb from King's College commented that the volume "is most successful when the analyses suggest modes of communication particular to the visual arts: the synoptic condensing of a narrative into a single event."

Holliday published The Origins of Roman Historical Commemoration in the Visual Arts in 2002, in which he demonstrated how Roman commemorative art intertwined narrative, style, and politics, providing insights into elite achievements, societal values, and the ideals of the Roman Republic. Shelley Hales described it as a "clearly written text," supplemented by "helpful, (mostly) well-placed images," and noted that he introduced "rites associated with each theme" before discussing "the theme's pictorial evolution." Additionally, he studied the function, development, and reception of Roman triumphal paintings, highlighting their role in commemorating military victories, shaping political propaganda, and influencing Roman audiences' perceptions of power and authority. In a related journal article, he analyzed the Ara Pacis Augustae, demonstrating how its imagery reflected political symbolism, addressed Roman concerns about cyclical history, and conveyed promises of stability under Augustus. His examination of processional imagery in late Etruscan funerary art similarly revealed how the iconography exalted deceased magistrates and reflected Italy's shifting political landscape as Rome gained power.

Holliday also examined the influence of classical antiquity on California's architecture, landscape, and social ideals in his 2016 work American Arcadia: California and the Classical Tradition, offering perspectives on the state's history, identity, and cultural impact. Michele Valerie Ronnick described it as a "fascinating study" and praised its "beautiful illustrations and well-edited" content.

In 2024, Holliday published Power, Image, and Memory: Historical Subjects in Art. This work explored how art commemorating historical events shapes collective memory and national identities, highlighting the deliberate use of narrative techniques and political ideologies to convey power and influence.

== Awards and honors ==
- 1979-1980 – Fellowship, Samuel H. Kress Foundation
- 1982-1983 – Excellence in Teaching Award, University of Houston
- 1985-1986 – Postdoctoral resident fellowship, Getty Research Institute
- 1994-1995 – Fellow, American Academy in Rome
- 2012 – Andrew W. Mellon Fellow, Huntington Library, Art Museum and Botanical Gardens

== Bibliography ==
=== Books ===
- The Fascination with the Past: John Henry Parker's Photographs of Rome (1991) ISBN 9780945486053
- Narrative and Event in Ancient Art (1993) ISBN 9780521430135
- The Origins of Roman Historical Commemoration in the Visual Arts (2002) ISBN 9780521810135
- American Arcadia: California and the Classical Tradition (2016) ISBN 9780190256517
- Power, Image, and Memory: Historical Subjects in Art (2024) ISBN 9780190901103

=== Selected articles ===
- Holliday, P. J. (1990). Time, History, and Ritual on the Ara Pacis Augustae. The Art Bulletin, 72(4), 542-557.
- Holliday, P. J. (1990). Processional imagery in late Etruscan funerary art. American Journal of Archaeology, 94(1), 73-93.
- Holliday, P. J. (1997). Roman triumphal painting: its function, development, and reception. The Art Bulletin, 79(1), 130-147.
- Holliday, P. J. (2015). Roman art and the state. In Blackwell’s Companion to Roman Art (pp. 195–213). Wiley-Blackwell.
- Holliday, P. J. (2021). Imagery and space. In A Companion to the Political Culture of the Roman Republic (pp. 484–503). Wiley-Blackwell.
