= Eta Sigma Phi =

American honor society for classics

- ΗΣΦ
- Founded: 1914; 112 years ago University of Chicago
- Type: Honor
- Affiliation: Independent
- Status: Active
- Emphasis: Classics
- Scope: National
- Motto: φιλοσοφοῦμεν καὶ φιλοκαλοῦμεν "We love both wisdom and beauty"
- Colors: Purple and Gold
- Publication: NUNTIUS
- Chapters: 180
- Headquarters: Eta Sigma Phi, c/o Stockton University; 101 Vera King Farris Dr. Galloway, New Jersey 08205; United States
- Website: etasigmaphi.org

Eta Sigma Phi (ΗΣΦ) is an American collegiate honor society for the study of Classics. It was established in 1914 at the University of Chicago in Chicago, Illinois. As of 2025, it has 180 chapters.

== History ==
Eta Sigma Phi grew out of a local undergraduate classical club founded by a group of students in the Department of Greek at the University of Chicago in 1914. This organization later united with a similar organization at Northwestern University and became Phi Sigma. Phi Sigma became a national fraternity in 1924, organizing chapters at leading colleges and universities.

On May 14, 1927, Phi Sigma became Eta Sigma Phi, the National Honorary Classical Fraternity, and was incorporated under the laws of the State of Illinois. Though nominally a fraternity, as an honor society it is open to all genders.

== Purpose ==
The Constitution of Eta Sigma Phi states that the purposes of the society are as follows:

- To develop and promote interest in classical study among the students of colleges and universities
- To promote closer fraternal relationship among students who are interested in classical study, including inter-campus relationship
- To engage generally in an effort to stimulate interest in classical study, and in the history, art, and literature of ancient Greece and Rome.

== Symbols ==
The organization's Greek motto, φιλοσοφοῦμεν καὶ φιλοκαλοῦμεν (English transliteration: "philosophoûmen kaì philokaloûmen"), translates into "We love wisdom and beauty." The saying is a paraphrase from Pericles' famous funeral oration delivered to his fellow Athenians. Its colors are purple and gold. Its biennial publication is NUNTIUS.

== Membership ==
There are three categories of membership: Active membership is limited to undergraduates who are enrolled in classes in Latin and/or Greek in the original languages. A student must meet the basic qualification of an attained grade of not less than "B" in courses in Latin and Greek, with completion of at least one semester or two quarters. Associate membership are open to graduate students who were undergraduate members of Eta Sigma Phi and graduate students in Classics who are elected under the requirements of membership.

Honorary membership is conferred upon persons selected by the chapter for their interest in the Classics and contributions to the understanding and appreciation of classical languages, history, and culture. Faculty who did not join Eta Sigma Phi as undergraduates may be elected as honorary members of the local chapter at their institution.

== Governance ==
Eta Sigma Phi is an undergraduate society, and its officers are active (undergraduate) members who are elected to office for a period of one year by the annual national convention. The finances of the society are managed by a board of trustees, composed of seven faculty members from active chapters who are elected for a period of three years. The board administers the contests and scholarship program. The executive secretary is a faculty member of an active chapter who is responsible for carrying out the policies of the society and is required to perform the duties usually assigned to this position.

== Activities ==
Although Eta Sigma Phi is "honorary" in nature, chapters usually must utilize programs or activities to carry out the purposes of the society. Groups of chapters use regional conferences as a means of stimulating interest and exchanging ideas.

Each year the society awards two scholarships for study abroad during the summer, one to the American School of Classical Studies at Athens and the other to the American Academy in Rome, to members who have recently graduated. A third scholarship, to a session of the Vergilian Society at Cumae, is also offered, with preference going to rising juniors and seniors.

Each year the society sponsors contests among college and university students to encourage the study of Latin and Greek on the college level. Participation in the contests is limited to colleges and universities in which there are Eta Sigma Phi chapters. The contests are in Greek translation, Latin translation, and Latin prose composition.

The society makes available to high school teachers inexpensive medals to award to outstanding students. Many Eta Sigma Phi chapters also award the medals in local high schools. These medals are intended to encourage the study of Latin in high school.

The society holds a national convention each year, late in March or in April. At this time, delegates conduct the business of the society, including the election of national officers, and workshops are held. Local chapters bid to host the convention, and an effort is made to move the site from region to region to accommodate chapters in different parts of the country.

== Notable members ==
- Judith P. Hallett, professor emerita at the University of Maryland, College Park
- Alice Kober, classicist best known for her work on the decipherment of Linear B. Educated at Hunter College and Columbia University
- Cecelia Eaton Luschnig, classics scholar, translator, and professor at the University of Idaho
- Frank Clayton Matthews, prelate who served as Suffragan Bishop of Virginia
- John O. Moseley, president of Central State College and the University of Nevada, Reno
- Michele Valerie Ronnick ( Zeta Theta), professor in the College of Liberal Arts and Sciences at Wayne State University
- Ruth Scodel, professor ererita of Greek and Latin at the University of Michigan
- Virginia Staudt Sexton, psychologist and author
- Thomas J. Sienkewicz, professor emeritus of classics at Monmouth College
- Gertrude Smith, professor of Greek at the University of Chicago
- Anthony Spaulding, member of Parliament of Jamaica and Jamaican Minister of Housing
- William Sims Thurman, faculty member at Winthrop University and Harvard University Center for Byzantine Studies; founder of the classics program of University of North Carolina at Asheville

== See also ==
- National Senior Classical League
- National Junior Classical League
- Honor cords
