= List of Eta Sigma Phi chapters =

Eta Sigma Phi is an honorary society for classical studies. Following is a list of Eta Sigma Phi chapters. Active chapters are indicated in bold. Inactive chapters and institutions are in italics.

Chapter	Charter date	Institution	Location	Status	Ref.
Alpha	1914	University of Chicago	Chicago	Inactive	
Beta	1915	Northwestern University	Evanston, Illinois	Inactive	
**Gamma**	1925	Ohio University	Athens, Ohio	Active	
Delta	1925	Franklin College	Franklin, Indiana	Inactive	
**Epsilon**	1925	University of Iowa	Iowa City, Iowa	Active	
**Zeta**	1926	Denison University	Granville, Ohio	Active	
**Eta**	1926	Florida State University	Tallahassee, Florida	Active	
Theta	1926	Indiana University Bloomington	Bloomington, Indiana	Inactive	
**Iota**	1926	University of Vermont	Burlington, Vermont	Active	
**Kappa**	1926	Colorado College	Colorado Springs, Colorado	Active	
**Lambda**	1926	University of Mississippi	Oxford, Mississippi	Active	
**Mu**	1926	University of Cincinnati	Cincinnati	Active	
Nu	1926	Morningside College	Sioux City, Iowa	Inactive	
Xi	1926	University of Kansas	Lawrence, Kansas	Inactive	
**Omicron**	1927	University of Pennsylvania	Philadelphia	Active	
**Pi**	1927	Birmingham–Southern College	Birmingham, Alabama	Inactive	
**Rho**	1927	Drake University	Des Moines, Iowa	Inactive	
**Sigma**	1927	Miami University	Oxford, Ohio	Inactive	
**Tau**	1927	University of Kentucky	Lexington, Kentucky	Active	
Upsilon	1927	Mississippi State College for Women	Columbus, Mississippi	Inactive	
Phi	1927	West Virginia University	Morgantown, West Virginia	Inactive	
Chi	1927	Coe College	Cedar Rapids, Iowa	Inactive	
**Psi**	1927	Vanderbilt University	Nashville, Tennessee	Active	
**Omega**	1927	College of William & Mary	Williamsburg, Virginia	Active	
Alpha Alpha	1927	Winthrop College	Rock Hill, South Carolina	Inactive	
Alpha Beta	1927	University of Denver	Denver	Inactive	
**Alpha Gamma**	1927	Southern Methodist University	Dallas	Active	
**Alpha Delta**	1928	Agnes Scott College	Decatur, Georgia	Active	
Alpha Epsilon	1928	Lehigh University	Bethlehem, Pennsylvania	Inactive	
Alpha Zeta	1928	New York University	New York City	Inactive	
Alpha Eta	1928	University of Michigan	Ann Arbor, Michigan	Inactive	
**Alpha Theta**	1928	Hunter College	Manhattan	Active	
Alpha Iota	1928	University of South Carolina	Columbia, South Carolina	Inactive	
**Alpha Kappa**	1928	University of Illinois Urbana-Champaign	Urbana, Illinois	Active	
**Alpha Lambda**	1928	University of Oklahoma	Norman, Oklahoma	Active	
**Alpha Mu**	1928	University of Missouri	Columbia, Missouri	Active	
Alpha Nu	1929	Davidson College	Davidson, North Carolina	Inactive	
Alpha Xi	1929	Washington University in St. Louis	St. Louis County, Missouri	Inactive	
Alpha Omicron	1929	Lawrence University	Appleton, Wisconsin	Inactive	
**Alpha Pi**	1931	Gettysburg College	Gettysburg, Pennsylvania	Active	
Alpha Rho	1932	Muhlenberg College	Allentown, Pennsylvania	Inactive	
**Alpha Sigma**	1933	Emory University	Atlanta	Active	
Alpha Tau	1934	Ohio State University	Columbus, Ohio	Inactive	
**Alpha Upsilon**	1934	College of Wooster	Wooster, Ohio	Active	
Alpha Phi	1935	Millsaps College	Jackson, Mississippi	Inactive	
Alpha Chi	1936	Tulane University	New Orleans	Inactive	
Alpha Psi	1937	Washington & Jefferson College	Washington, Pennsylvania	Inactive	
Alpha Omega	1937	Louisiana State University	Baton Rouge, Louisiana	Inactive	
Beta Alpha	1938	University of South Dakota	Vermillion, South Dakota	Inactive	
Beta Beta	1939	Furman University	Greenville, South Carolina	Inactive	
**Beta Gamma**	1940	University of Richmond	Richmond, Virginia	Active	
**Beta Delta**	1941	University of Tennessee	Knoxville, Tennessee	Active	
Beta Epsilon	1941	Brooklyn College	Brooklyn	Inactive	
Beta Zeta	1941	Saint Louis University	St. Louis	Inactive	
Beta Eta	1941	Westminster College	Fulton, Missouri	Inactive	
**Beta Theta**	1942	Hampden–Sydney College	Hampden Sydney, Virginia	Active	
**Beta Iota**	1943	Wake Forest University	Winston-Salem, North Carolina	Active	
**Beta Kappa**	1949	Notre Dame of Maryland University	Baltimore	Active	
Beta Lambda	1949	Marymount College	Salina, Kansas	Inactive	
Beta Mu	1950	Butler University	Indianapolis, Indiana	Inactive	
**Beta Nu**	1950	University of Mary Washington	Fredericksburg, Virginia	Active	
Beta Xi	1950	Rosary College	River Forest, Illinois	Inactive	
Beta Omicron	1950	Mount Mary College	Milwaukee	Inactive	
**Beta Pi**	1950	University of Arkansas	Fayetteville, Arkansas	Active	
Beta Rho	1950	Duke University	Durham, North Carolina	Inactive	
**Beta Sigma**	1950	Marquette University	Milwaukee	Active	
Beta Tau	1950	Georgetown University	Washington, D.C.	Inactive	
**Beta Upsilon**	1951	Marshall University	Huntington, West Virginia	Active	
Beta Phi	1951	Adelphi College	Garden City, New York	Inactive	
**Beta Chi**	1951	Loyola University Maryland	Baltimore	Active	
**Beta Psi**	1952	Rhodes College	Memphis, Tennessee	Active	
**Beta Omega**	1952	Ball State University	Muncie, Indiana	Active	
Gamma Alpha	1952	Indiana State University	Terre Haute, Indiana	Inactive	
Gamma Beta	1952	Bowling Green State University	Bowling Green, Ohio	Inactive	
Gamma Gamma	1952	University of Wisconsin–Milwaukee	Milwaukee	Inactive	
Gamma Delta	1952	Yeshiva University	New York City	Inactive	
Gamma Epsilon	1952	University of Wisconsin–Madison	Madison, Wisconsin	Inactive	
Gamma Zeta	1952	Albion College	Albion, Michigan	Inactive	
Gamma Eta	1953	Louisiana Christian College	Pineville, Louisiana	Inactive	
Gamma Theta	1953	Georgetown College	Georgetown, Kentucky	Inactive	
**Gamma Iota**	1954	Wabash College	Crawfordsville, Indiana	Active	
Gamma Kappa	1954	Heidelberg College	Tiffin, Ohio	Inactive	
Gamma Lambda	1954	St. Mary's College of Maryland	St. Mary's City, Maryland	Inactive	
Gamma Mu	1954	Westminster College	New Wilmington, Pennsylvania	Inactive	
Gamma Nu	1955	Montclair State University	Montclair, New Jersey	Inactive	
Gamma Xi	1956	Howard University	Washington, D.C.	Inactive	
**Gamma Omicron**	1956	Monmouth College	Monmouth, Illinois	Active	
Gamma Pi	1957	St. Peter's College		Inactive	
Gamma Rho	1958	Hope College	Holland, Michigan	Inactive	
Gamma Sigma	1958	University of Texas at Austin	Austin, Texas	Inactive	
Gamma Tau	1958	Mississippi College	Clinton, Mississippi	Inactive	
**Gamma Upsilon**	1960	Austin College	Sherman, Texas	Active	
Gamma Phi	1960	LeMoyne–Owen College	Memphis, Tennessee	Inactive	
Gamma Chi	1960	Lindenwood College	St. Charles, Missouri	Inactive	
Gamma Psi	1960	Ursuline College	Pepper Pike, Ohio	Inactive	
**Gamma Omega**	1960	Baylor University	Waco, Texas	Active	
**Delta Alpha**	1961	Randolph College	Lynchburg, Virginia	Active	
**Delta Beta**	1961	Canisius University	Buffalo, New York	Active	
Delta Gamma	1962	Marywood University	Scranton, Pennsylvania	Inactive	
Delta Delta	1963	University of Alberta	Edmonton, Alberta, Canada	Inactive	
Delta Epsilon	1963	Belhaven University	Jackson, Mississippi	Inactive	
**Delta Zeta**	1963	Colgate University	Hamilton, New York	Active	
Delta Eta	1964	Seton Hill University	Greensburg, Pennsylvania	Inactive	
**Delta Theta**	1964	Dickinson College	Carlisle, Pennsylvania	Active	
Delta Iota	1964	College of Saint Teresa	Winona, Minnesota	Inactive	
Delta Kappa	1964	Carroll College	Helena, Montana	Inactive	
**Delta Lambda**	1964	College of the Holy Cross	Worcester, Massachusetts	Active	
Delta Mu	1965	Illinois State University	Normal, Illinois	Inactive	
Delta Nu	1968	LaSalle College	Quebec, Montreal, Canada	Inactive	
Delta Xi	1968	Eckerd College	St. Petersburg, Florida	Inactive	
Delta Omicron	1968	Texas Tech University	Lubbock, Texas	Inactive	
Delta Pi	1968	Randolph–Macon College	Ashland, Virginia	Inactive	
Delta Rho	1968	Radford University	Radford, Virginia	Inactive	
**Delta Sigma**	1968	University of California, Irvine	Irvine, California	Active	
**Delta Tau**	1968	University of Delaware	Newark, Delaware	Active	
**Delta Upsilon**	1969	Valparaiso University	Valparaiso, Indiana	Active	
Delta Phi	1970	Missouri State University	Springfield, Missouri	Inactive	
**Delta Chi**	1971	St. Olaf College	Northfield, Minnesota	Active	
Delta Psi	1971	Thiel College	Greenville, Pennsylvania	Inactive	
Delta Omega	1971	Macalester College	Saint Paul, Minnesota	Inactive	
Epsilon Alpha	1971	Centenary College of Louisiana	Shreveport, Louisiana	Inactive	
**Epsilon Beta**	1971	George Washington University	Washington, D.C.	Active	
Epsilon Gamma	1972	University of Scranton	Scranton, Pennsylvania	Inactive	
**Epsilon Epsilon**	1974	Rockford University	Rockford, Illinois	Active	
Epsilon Zeta	1975	University of Idaho	Moscow, Idaho	Inactive	
Epsilon Eta	1976	Kent State University	Kent, Ohio	Inactive	
Epsilon Theta	1977	Duquesne University	Pittsburgh	Inactive	
Epsilon Iota	1978	University of Florida	Gainesville, Florida	Inactive	
**Epsilon Kappa**	1979	Brigham Young University	Provo, Utah	Active	
Epsilon Lambda	1980	St. Catherine University	Saint Paul, Minnesota	Inactive	
Epsilon Mu	1982	Fordham University	New York City	Inactive	
**Epsilon Nu**	1981	Creighton University	Omaha, Nebraska	Active	
**Epsilon Xi**	1981	Gustavus Adolphus College	St. Peter, Minnesota	Active	
**Epsilon Omicron**	1982	University of Massachusetts Amherst	Amherst, Massachusetts	Active	
Epsilon Pi	1982	Concordia College		Inactive	
**Epsilon Rho**	1983	College of Charleston	Charleston, South Carolina	Active	
**Epsilon Sigma**	1983	Augustana College	Rock Island, Illinois	Active	
Epsilon Tau	1983	Beloit College	Beloit, Wisconsin	Inactive	
**Epsilon Upsilon**	1984	University of New Hampshire	Durham, New Hampshire	Active	
**Epsilon Phi**	1985	Knox College	Galesburg, Illinois	Active	
Epsilon Chi	1986	University of South Florida	Tampa, Florida	Inactive	
**Epsilon Psi**	1987	Santa Clara University	Santa Clara, California	Active	
Epsilon Omega	1987	Syracuse University	Syracuse, New York	Inactive	
Zeta Alpha	1987	Saint John's University	New York City	Inactive	
**Zeta Beta**	1988	Temple University	Philadelphia	Active	
**Zeta Gamma**	1989	San Diego State University	San Diego	Active	
**Zeta Delta**	1989	Sewanee: The University of the South	Sewanee, Tennessee	Active	
**Zeta Epsilon**	1990	Rutgers University–New Brunswick	New Brunswick, New Jersey	Active	
Zeta Zeta	1990	University of Washington	Seattle	Inactive	
**Zeta Eta**	1993	Loyola Marymount University	Los Angeles	Active	
**Zeta Theta**	1991	Pennsylvania State University	State College, Pennsylvania	Active	
**Zeta Iota**	1991	University of Georgia	Athens, Georgia	Active	
**Zeta Kappa**	1996	Trinity College	Hartford, Connecticut	Active	
**Zeta Lambda**	1992	University of Louisville	Louisville, Kentucky	Active	
Zeta Mu	1992	Troy University	Troy, Alabama	Inactive	
**Zeta Nu**	1994	University of Maryland, College Park	College Park, Maryland	Active	
Zeta Xi	1994	Iowa State University	Ames, Iowa	Inactive	
Zeta Omicron	1996	Wayne State University	Detroit	Inactive	
Zeta Pi	1994	University of Utah	Salt Lake City	Inactive	
**Zeta Rho**	1996	University of Texas at Arlington	Arlington, Texas	Active	
Zeta Sigma	1995	University of Minnesota	Minneapolis and Saint Paul, Minnesota	Inactive	
**Zeta Tau**	1997	University of Pittsburgh	Pittsburgh	Active	
Zeta Upsilon	1997	Sweet Briar College	Amherst County, Virginia	Inactive	
**Zeta Phi**	1995	University of California, Santa Barbara	Santa Barbara, California	Active	
Zeta Chi	1995	Xavier University	Cincinnati	Inactive	
**Zeta Psi**	1996	Hollins University	Hollins, Virginia	Active	
Zeta Omega	1996	University of North Carolina at Greensboro	Greensboro, North Carolina	Inactive	
Eta Alpha	1996	University of North Carolina at Chapel Hill	Chapel Hill, North Carolina	Inactive	
Eta Beta	1997	Southern Illinois University		Inactive	
Eta Gamma	1996	Loyola University New Orleans	New Orleans	Inactive	
**Eta Delta**	1996	Hillsdale College	Hillsdale, Michigan	Active	
Eta Epsilon	1996	Amherst College	Amherst, Massachusetts	Inactive	
**Eta Zeta**	1998	Truman State University	Kirksville, Missouri	Active	
**Eta Eta**	1999	Virginia Tech	Blacksburg, Virginia	Active	
**Eta Theta**	1998	DePauw University	Greencastle, Indiana	Active	
**Eta Iota**	1999	University of Arizona	Tucson, Arizona	Active	
**Eta Kappa**	1999	Catholic University of America	Washington, D.C.	Active	
**Eta Lambda**	1999	University of Dallas	Irving, Texas	Active	
**Eta Mu**	2000	University of California, Davis	Davis, California	Active	
Eta Nu	2001	University of Rochester	Rochester, New York	Inactive	
Eta Xi	2001	California State University, Long Beach	Long Beach, California	Inactive	
**Eta Omicron**	2002	Assumption College		Active	
**Eta Pi**	2002	Hobart and William Smith Colleges	Geneva, New York	Active	
Eta Rho	2002	University of Illinois at Chicago	Chicago	Inactive	
Eta Sigma	2003	California State University, Fresno	Fresno, California	Inactive	
**Eta Tau**	2003	University of North Carolina at Asheville	Asheville, North Carolina	Active	
Eta Upsilon	2003	University of Southern California	Los Angeles	Inactive	
**Eta Phi**	2005	Union College	Schenectady, New York	Active	
**Eta Chi**	2005	Purdue University	West Lafayette, Indiana	Active	
Eta Psi	2003	Michigan State University	East Lansing, Michigan	Inactive	
**Eta Omega**	2005	Austin Peay State University	Clarksville, Tennessee	Active	
Theta Alpha	2005	Franklin & Marshall College	Lancaster, Pennsylvania	Inactive	
Theta Beta	2005	University of Alabama	Tuscaloosa, Alabama	Inactive	
Theta Gamma	2006	Roger Williams University	Bristol, Rhode Island	Inactive	
**Theta Delta**	2006	Seton Hall University	South Orange, New Jersey	Active	
**Theta Epsilon**	2006	Trinity University	San Antonio	Active	
Theta Zeta	2006	Case Western Reserve University	Cleveland	Inactive	
Theta Eta	2006	Transylvania University	Lexington, Kentucky	Inactive	
Theta Theta	2006	University of Connecticut	Storrs, Connecticut	Inactive	
Theta Iota	2007	Illinois Wesleyan University	Bloomington, Illinois	Inactive	
Theta Kappa	2007	University of Texas at Tyler	Tyler, Texas	Inactive	
**Theta Lambda**	2007	Hamilton College	Clinton, New York	Active	
**Theta Mu**	2007	University of Nebraska		Active	
Theta Nu	2007	Cornell University	Ithaca, New York	Inactive	
**Theta Xi**	2007	Gonzaga University	Spokane, Washington	Active	
Theta Omicron	2007	Carthage College	Kenosha, Wisconsin	Inactive	
**Theta Pi**	2007	Kenyon College	Gambier, Ohio	Active	
Theta Rho	2008	University of Miami	Coral Gables, Florida	Inactive	
**Theta Sigma**	2008	Wright State University	Fairborn, Ohio	Active	
**Theta Tau**	2008	Stockton University	Galloway Township, New Jersey	Active	
Theta Upsilon	2008	University of North Texas	Denton, Texas	Inactive	
**Theta Phi**	2008	Franciscan University of Steubenville	Steubenville, Ohio	Active	
Theta Chi	2009	Mount Holyoke College	South Hadley, Massachusetts	Inactive	
**Theta Psi**	2009	Washington and Lee University	Lexington, Virginia	Active	
Theta Omega	2009	John Carroll University	University Heights, Ohio	Inactive	
**Iota Alpha**	2009	The College of New Jersey	Ewing Township, New Jersey	Active	
**Iota Beta**	2009	Northwestern State University	Natchitoches, Louisiana	Active	
**Iota Gamma**	2009	Samford University	Homewood, Alabama	Active	
**Iota Delta**	2010	Arizona State University	Tempe, Arizona	Active	
Iota Epsilon	2010	Villanova University	Villanova, Pennsylvania	Inactive	
**Iota Zeta**	2011	Christopher Newport University	Newport News, Virginia	Active	
Iota Eta	2012	Ohio Wesleyan University	Delaware, Ohio	Inactive	
Iota Theta	2012	Whitman College	Walla Walla, Washington	Inactive	
Iota Iota	2012	University of Texas at San Antonio	San Antonio	Inactive	
**Iota Kappa**	2012	Loyola University Chicago	Chicago	Active	
Iota Lambda	2012	Luther College		Inactive	
**Iota Mu**	2013	Virginia Wesleyan College	Virginia Beach, Virginia	Active	
**Iota Nu**	2013	Skidmore College	Saratoga Springs, New York	Active	
**Iota Xi**	2013	Bucknell University	Lewisburg, Pennsylvania	Active	
Iota Omicron	2013	Siena College	Loudonville, New York	Inactive	
Iota Pi	2014	Tufts University	Medford, Massachusetts	Inactive	
**Iota Rho**	2014	Christendom College	Front Royal, Virginia	Active	
**Iota Sigma**	2014	Grand Valley State University	Allendale, Michigan	Active	
Iota Tau	2015	University of Colorado Boulder	Boulder, Colorado	Inactive	
**Iota Upsilon**	2015	University of Oregon	Eugene, Oregon	Active	
Iota Phi	2015	San Francisco State University	San Francisco	Inactive	
Iota Chi	2016	Brandeis University	Waltham, Massachusetts	Inactive	
**Iota Psi**	2017	University of California, Los Angeles	Los Angeles	Active	
**Iota Omega**	2017	University of Virginia	Charlottesville, Virginia	Active	
**Kappa Alpha**	2017	Augustana University	Sioux Falls, South Dakota	Active	
Kappa Beta	2017	Houston Christian University	Houston	Inactive	
**Kappa Gamma**	2017	Bates College	Lewiston, Maine	Active	
Kappa Delta	2018	University of Montana	Missoula, Montana	Inactive	
Kappa Epsilon	2019	Haverford College	Haverford, Pennsylvania	Inactive	
Kappa Zeta	2019	Elon University	Elon, North Carolina	Inactive	
**Kappa Eta**	2019	Asbury University	Wilmore, Kentucky	Active	
**Kappa Theta**	2019	Mississippi State University	Starkville, Mississippi	Active	
Kappa Iota	2021	Centre College	Danville, Kentucky	Inactive	
**Kappa Kappa**	2022	Providence College	Providence, Rhode Island	Active	
**Kappa Lambda**	2022	College of Saint Benedict & Saint John's University	St. Joseph and Collegeville Township, Minnesota	Active	
**Kappa Mu**	2023	Belmont University	Nashville, Tennessee	Active	
