= Liberty Classical Academy =

Location
- White Bear Lake, MN; USA
- 45°3′30″N 93°1′10″W

Information
- Type: Private, day
- Motto: Academic Distinction. Classical Tradition. Christian Worldview.
- Established: 2003
- Director: Rebekah Hagstrom, M.A.
- Faculty: 50
- Enrollment: 387 total
- Average class size: 17 students
- Student to teacher ratio: 8:1
- Colors: Navy and Bronze
- Athletics: Baseball; Football; Basketball; Soccer; Track; Volleyball; Golf; Softball
- Mascot: Lion
- Website: www.LibertyClassicalAcademy.org

Liberty Classical Academy is an independent college-preparatory private Christian school in White Bear Lake, Minnesota, United States, serving students in prekindergarten through grade 12. Liberty Classical's stated purpose is to "classically educate children to be moral leaders who impact the culture for Christ." It is a member of the Association of Classical Christian Schools, and is accredited by Christian Schools International.

Liberty Classical was launched in the autumn of 2003 by a group of parents seeking to give their children a solid Christian education along with rigorous academic standards, and to teach them how to think critically and learn for themselves. The first 28 students, in grades K–8, met at Lake Phalen Community Church in Maplewood. By 2006 the school had grown to over 100 students, and it expanded by moving grades 6–11 into classrooms at First Evangelical Free Church, a few miles to the north. (In the fall of 2009, grades PK-5 moved to Christ the King Lutheran Church in White Bear Lake.) In June 2008, the first class of four seniors graduated, and that fall, the preschool was opened. Both campuses merged in the fall of 2014 at their new campus in White Bear Lake, MN. Despite its small size, Liberty has already had one National Merit Scholarship Finalist and another student Commended.

Liberty Classical Academy believes homosexuality and same-sex marriage are immoral, and will not employ members of LGBTQ community.

== Academics ==
A classical education teaches students how to learn, reason, and communicate effectively. These three phases are known as the Trivium, and correspond to the natural stages of child cognitive development. In the grammar stage, roughly from grades PK–6, children "amaze adults with their ability to absorb large amounts of information." At Liberty, these students use fun songs, chants, skits, and rhymes to memorize everything from punctuation and sentence-structure rules to chemical elements to U.S. Presidents. Mastery of reading is emphasized, with 15 minutes oral reading part of daily homework. Between grades 7 and 9, children enter the logic phase, asking "why?" questions in their quest for deeper understanding. At this stage, Liberty introduces formal logic, equipping students with the tools they need for critical thinking and sound reasoning. Finally, in grades 10 through 11, students move into the rhetoric stage, where they naturally seek to express their own conclusions about what they have learned. At this point, Liberty teaches formal rhetoric, "[enabling] students to clearly and persuasively communicate their own ideas."

Liberty's first graduating class

Liberty believes that all children can learn and achieve at a high level, when the expectations are high and the classroom is an exciting place that engages their attention. From the earliest grades, students memorize famous poems or speeches and recite them to their peers. Extra credit and prizes are awarded to students for reading "challenge books" beyond their grade level. Science Fair projects begin in second grade. "By the time students are in high school, they are writing 20-page thesis papers on what they believe." Every member of the senior class researches, writes and presents a formal Senior Thesis to the Liberty school body and receives a grade from a panel of faculty judges trained in rhetorical exercise. This rite of passage provides students the opportunity to put into practice all of the self-directed learning and logical evaluation and communication skills they have obtained at Liberty and thereby demonstrate their readiness for higher education.

Latin is taught from grades 3 to 8, both to improve analytical thinking skills and "because of its broad application in a variety of areas," including medicine, classical literature, and the foundations of the English language. Since 2004, Liberty students have earned honors in the National Latin Exam. Two years of a modern foreign language (Spanish and German are the 2008-09 offerings) are also required before graduation.

== Christian worldview ==
Cantamus Christi choir in concert

Liberty is a multi-denominational Christian school, and welcomes students of any or no religious background, with the understanding that only basic Christian doctrine will be taught.

"The Christian element gives kids a moral grounding, and it is so important for our culture to have a moral grounding. When kids are taught that they are created by God and that he has a plan for them, it gives them a purpose—which in turn gives them motivation and self-confidence outside of what the world can provide."
—Rebekah Hagstrom, Director

As the classical approach also encourages the development of virtue and leadership, students at every level participate in community service and ministry projects. Seniors must provide leadership roles in campus activities and fulfill 30 hours of community service, which culminates in a ministry trip every spring. In May 2009, they will "spend a week helping lower-income elderly in Washington D.C. maintain their homes' exteriors and yards through Episcopal Senior Ministries, a program that helps older folks stay in their homes as long as possible. The students will also visit and encourage elderly residents in group and nursing homes."

== Extracurriculars ==
Grades 4–5 performing Julius Caesar

The school offers visual arts and drama in every grade, highlighted at an Art & Drama Show at each school. In May 2008, the first graders presented Pinocchio Goes To School, in costume, with all lines memorized. The kindergarteners joined grades 2–3 in staging a 45-minute version of C.S. Lewis' The Lion, the Witch, and the Wardrobe. Grades 4–5 did The Taming of the Shrew in Shakespeare's original iambic pentameter. Middle school students put on Arabian Nights, grades 9–10 performed Knights of the Rad Table, and the juniors and seniors presented The Somewhat True Tale of Robin Hood.

Music is an equally important part of life at Liberty. Choir is required through fourth grade and elective afterward, with the Cantamus Christi group (pictured above) open to grades 9–12 by audition. Band is offered at both the Upper and Lower Schools beginning in fourth grade. All music groups perform at the All-School Christmas Program in December, the Annual Band/Choir Concert, and Graduation.

Liberty has a well stocked library, helped by a $10,000 award from retail chain Target that was the subject of a full-page ad in Newsweek magazine.

The school's numerous social activities include field trips to museums, bowling excursions, Harvest Festival, literary "Character Day", hayrides, theater nights, ice skating, and an all-school day of skiing and snowboarding each February. The Upper School has a Spring Formal, and the senior class goes on a retreat each fall.

== Athletics ==
Liberty Lions baseball in action

As of 2008-19, Liberty offers boys' teams in baseball (grades 4–12), basketball (4–12), track (6–12), and cross-country skiing (grades 9-12). Girls' sports include basketball (grades 4-12), volleyball (6–12), and track (6–12). The soccer teams (grades 6–8, and 9–12) are coed. Sports teams are continually being added as enrollment, participation, and parent volunteering increase.

Liberty is a member school of the Minnesota State High School League for soccer, boys' basketball, baseball, and track. The middle and lower school teams participate in the St. Paul Catholic Athletic Association, where the middle school girls basketball team won the Class C Championship in 2008. Local homeschooled students are invited to join Liberty's teams (PSEO excluded), providing these students an opportunity for organized sports they would not otherwise have, and helping to fill out the squads.
