= Virginia Staudt Sexton =

American psychologist (1916–1997)

- Born: Virginia Mary Staudt; August 30, 1916; New York City, U.S.
- Died: May 24, 1997 (aged 80); Cincinnati, Ohio, U.S.
- Education: Fordham University
- Occupation: Psychologist
- Years active: 1952-1990
- Employer(s): St. Peter and St. Paul's School (1936-1939); Hunter High School (1939); New York City Department of Welfare (1938-1944); Notre Dame College of Staten Island (1944-1952)
- Organization(s): International Council of Psychologists (1978-1982), International Organization for the Study of Group Tensions, Interamerican Society of Psychology, International Society for the History of the Behavioral and Social Sciences, International Association of Applied Society
- Spouse: Richard J. Sexton (m. 1961; died 1997)
- Children: 4
- Scientific career
- Known for: Research on shock therapy and psychosurgery for schizophrenic patients
- Fields: History and philosophy of psychology; feminine, international, and Humanistic psychology
- Workplaces: Hunter College; Notre Dame College

Virginia Mary Staudt (Sexton) (August 30, 1916–May 24, 1997) was an American psychologist who was the author of numerous publications in the history of American and international psychology. Virginia began to list history as her major field of interest in APA directories as early as 1957, and it retained its importance in her entries from then on. When the Division of the History of Psychology was organized as APA's 26th division in1965, she became a charter member. She served two terms as the division's Secretary-Treasurer (1972-1978) and served as Program Chair (1975), President- Elect (1978), and President (1979-1980).

== Early life and education ==
Virginia Mary Staudt was born in New York City, as the youngest of four children to Philip Henry Staudt, a special patrol officer for the Interborough Rapid Transit Company, and Kathryn Philippa (Burkard) Staudt, who was a designer and sample maker of infant’s and children’s wear prior to marrying Philip. Staudt’s parents highly valued academic achievements when it came to raising their children.

In 1933, Staudt entered Hunter College of the City University of New York (CUNY) after graduating from Cathedral High School in New York City. Staudt graduated from CUNY in 1936 with a B.A. cum laude in the classics and was also elected to Phi Beta Kappa and to Eta Sigma Phi, the classics’ honor society. During her senior year of college, she worked as a teacher for Hunter College Model Elementary School, Hunter College High School, and George Washington High School. Her goal after graduating was to become a high school teacher of Latin or Greek, but unable to fulfill her dream, due to the scarcity of jobs caused by the Great Depression, she decided to get her master's degree in experimental psychology at the Fordham University Graduate School of Arts and Science in February 1938. Staudt received her postdoctoral training in clinical psychology at New York State Psychiatric Institute and another one in neuroanatomy at Columbia University.

On January 21, 1961, she married Richard J. Sexton, Ph.D., an English professor at Fordham University. With this marriage Sexton became a stepmother to three girls and one boy ranging from the ages of eight to twenty-one. The youngest of her stepchildren Richard Sexton holds a Ph.D. in psychology and the second youngest Mary Sexton is a doctoral candidate in educational administration.

== Contributions and achievements ==
After quitting her job as a lecturer at Notre Dame College of Staten Island, Virginia Staudt Sexton worked as a guidance director at Fordham University. While at Notre Dame College she opened a psychology lab, created a psychology major, and became associate professor and chair of the psychology department. While working at Fordham she conducted research on shock therapy and psychosurgery for schizophrenic patients. Sexton had published over one hundred articles, several scholarly monographs, and seven books. She spent the bulk of her career at Lehman College in the Bronx.vAfter her retirement there, she continued working at St. John's University in Queens, NY.

=== History and philosophy of psychology ===
Virginia Staudt Sexton had contributed to national and internationally in the history and philosophy of psychology. Sexton is known for her contributions of linking psychology to Catholicism, one of the books that reflected this linkage is Catholics in Psychology: A Historical Survey which was translated in Spanish. Sexton works drew attention to the contribution of Catholic psychologists, including Edward A. Pace, the first American Catholic and priest to study with Wilhelm Wundt. She aided in the affiliation of the American Catholic Psychological Association (ACPA) with the APA where she served as president of the APA’s Division of Philosophical Psychology and its Division of Humanistic Psychology. Sexton work with ACPA was aimed at helping facilitate employment opportunities for Catholic psychologists. She also promoted many international issues because she believed that psychologists “must develop an international vision of their field” and research.

== Later life ==
Sexton died on May 24, 1997, at home in Cincinnati, Ohio.
