= National Latin Exam =

Test given to Latin students

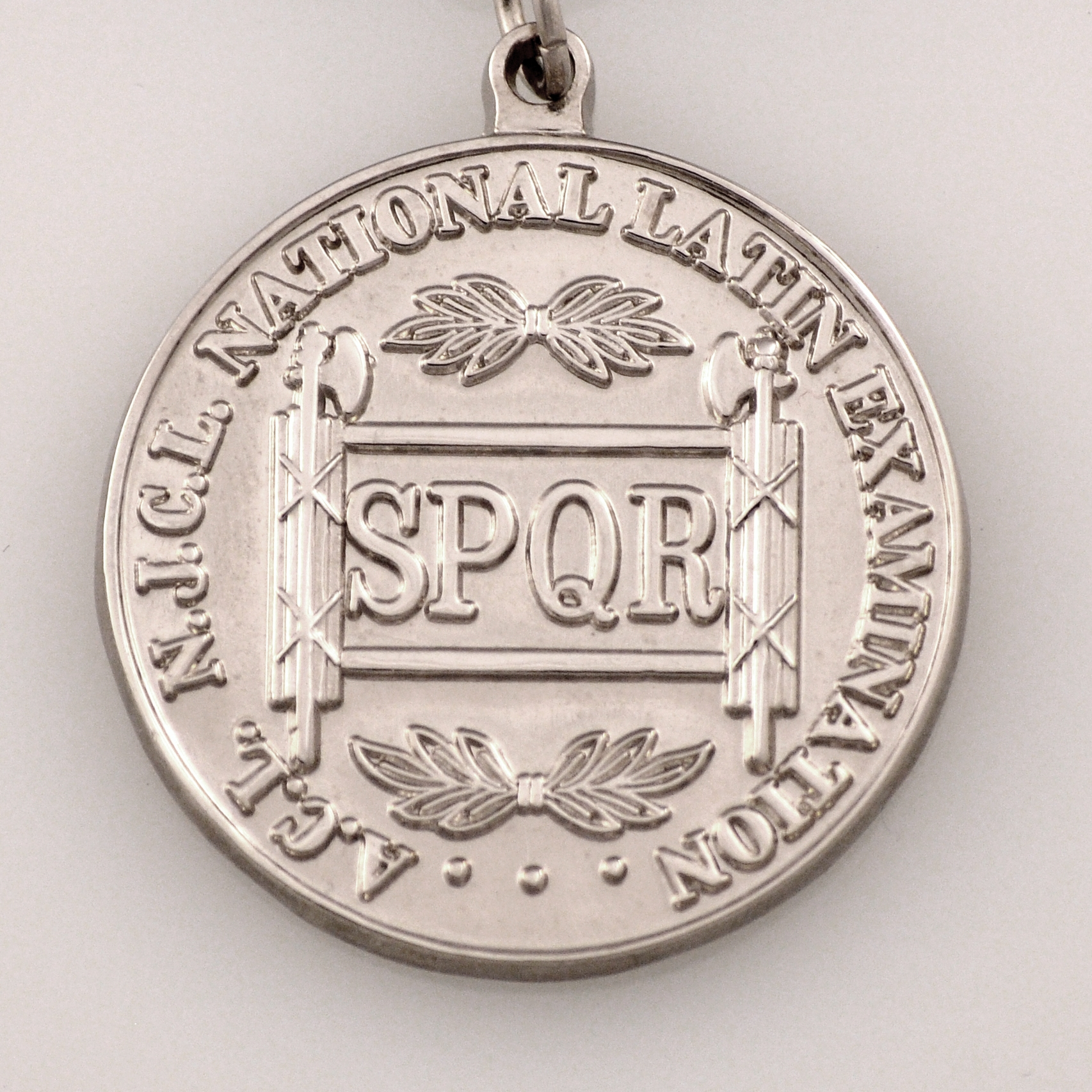
National Latin Exam silver medal

The National Latin Exam is a test given to Latin students. Sponsored by the U.S.-based American Classical League and the National Junior Classical League, the exam was given in 2023 to over 107,000 students in the U.S., Australia, Canada, China, France, Germany, Iran, Italy, Japan, New Zealand, Poland, United Kingdom, Zimbabwe, and Taiwan. The test covers general knowledge of Latin grammar and vocabulary, mythology, Roman culture, derivatives, and translation abilities.

The office of the National Latin Exam is located in James Farmer Hall on the campus of the University of Mary Washington in Fredericksburg, Virginia.

== Philosophy ==
The philosophy of the National Latin Exam is predicated on providing every Latin student the opportunity to experience a sense of personal accomplishment and success in their study of the Latin language and culture. This opportunity exists for all students on the National Latin Exam since they are not competing with their fellow students on a comparative basis, but are evaluated solely on their own performance on the exam. The basic purposes of the NLE are to promote the study of Latin and to encourage the individual student.

== Format ==
The National Latin Exam is a forty-question, multiple-choice test with a time limit of forty minutes; it is offered to students on seven levels.

In 2021, the exam names changed from traditional "Latin I," "Latin II" etc to descriptive titles. This was done to allow teachers and students to better choose exams that correlate to their program of studies. On the Introduction to Latin, Beginning Latin, Intermediate Latin, Advanced Latin Prose, and Advanced Latin Poetry exams, there are questions on grammar, comprehension, mythology, derivatives, literature, Roman life, history, geography, oral Latin, and Latin in use in the modern world. A new exam was introduced in 2021 which replaced the previous Latin III exam called the Intermediate Latin Reading Comprehension Exam. This exam contains two adapted Latin passages with questions focusing on reading comprehension, with some pertinent background questions on history, mythology, or derivatives. The Advanced Latin Reading Comprehension exam contains two authentic Latin passages, one prose and one poetry, as the basis for questions on grammar, comprehension, historical background, classical literature, and literary devices.

The exam is scored based on the number of questions answered correctly, with no penalty for guessing.

With the exception of the Introduction to Latin Exam, any of the other exams can be taken two years in a row, if that is what best aligns with the school's or district's Latin program. However, teachers are encouraged to keep students moving forward and not "stagnate" on a level that is too elementary. The student is not required to take an actual Latin class to take an exam; however, the student must have an official sponsor to take an exam. The test can either be taken in person or online.

== Awards ==
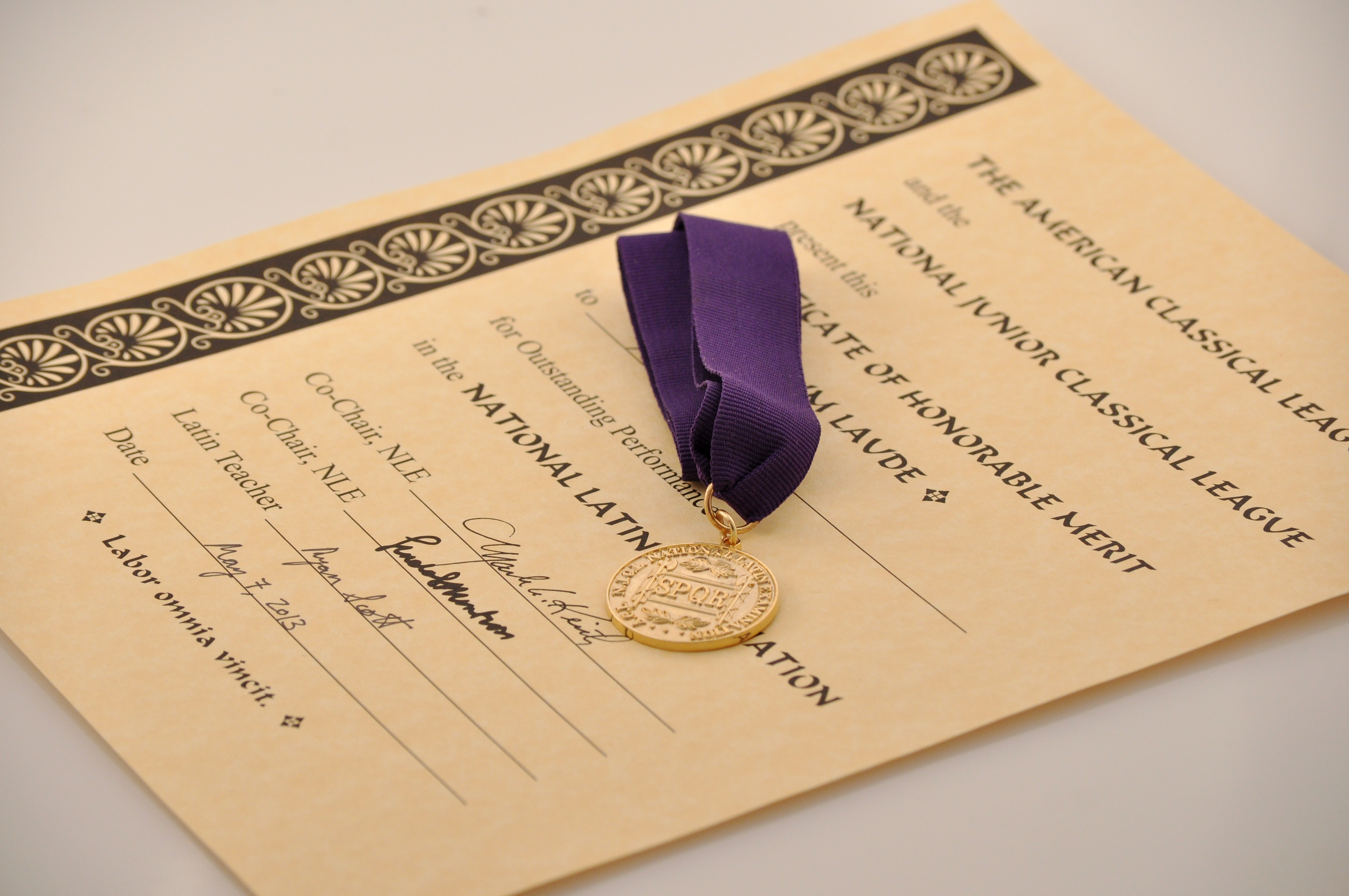
The National Latin Exam gold medal and certificate

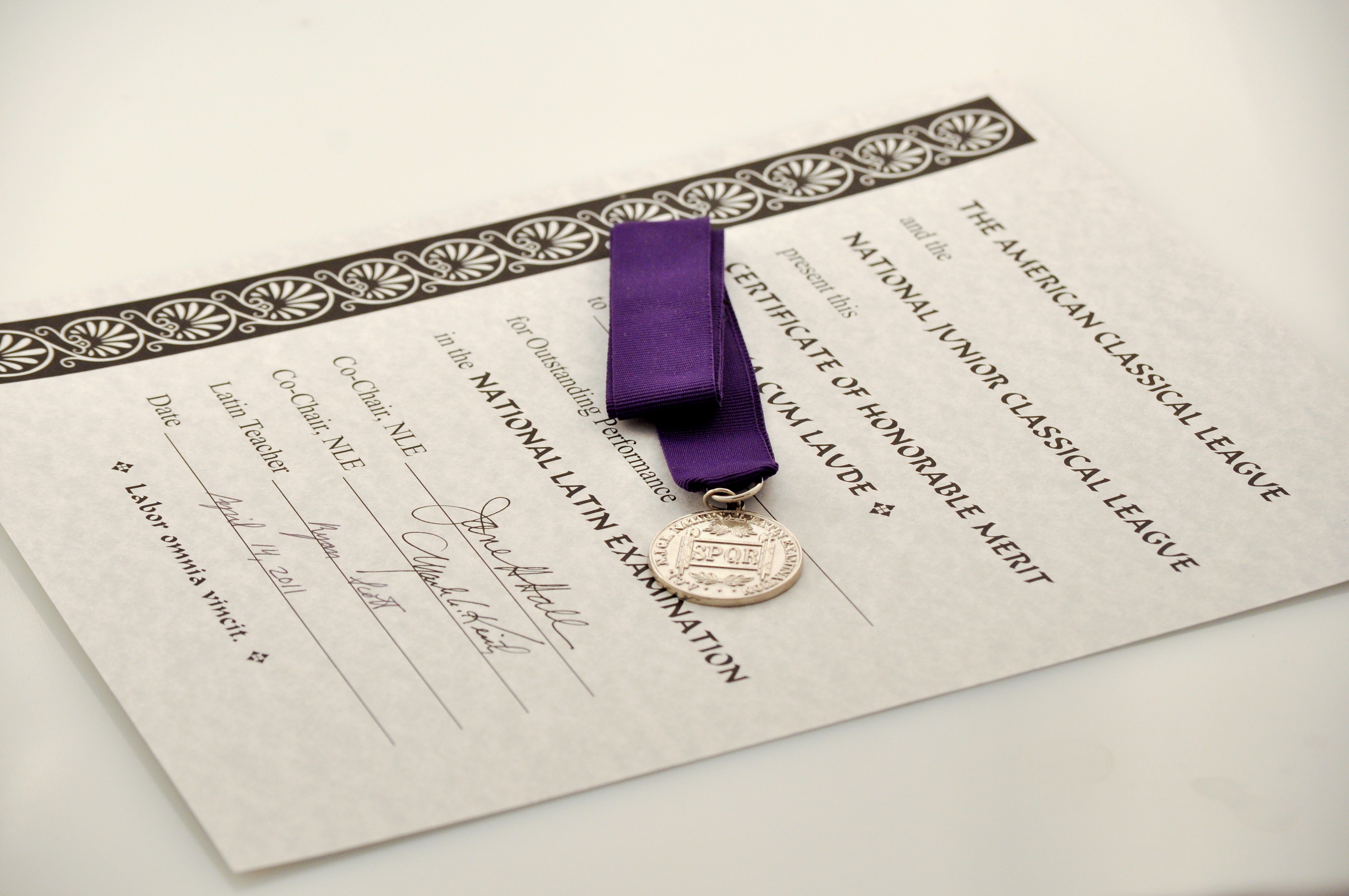
The National Latin Exam silver medal and certificate

Several awards are available to those students who excel on the NLE:

=== Medals and Certificates ===
- Perfect paper: Colored certificate with name printed
- Gold medal and a summa cum laude certificate awarded to top scorers (roughly top 10%)
- Silver medal and a maxima cum laude certificate to next high scorers (roughly top 25%)
- Magna cum laude certificate to next high scorers (roughly top 35%)
- Cum Laude certificate to those who score above the national average for that year

An NLE Certificate of Merit is also provided for each school participating in the exam.

=== Special Book Awards ===
Students who have three or more years of perfect papers, or four or more years of gold medals are sent special book awards in addition to the special certificate. The perfect papers/ gold medals must be different levels of the exam and at least one must be on an Advanced level.

== Scholarships ==
The National Latin Exam offers several different types of scholarships:

=== Maureen O'Donnell Academic Scholarships ===
Seniors who win a gold medal on any of the Advanced exams are eligible to apply for one of up to twelve $2,000 scholarships awarded annually. Those who apply must agree to take a least one course per semester of Latin or Classical Greek in their first year of college. Recipients may reapply, if they continue their study of Latin or Greek. More than $2 million has been awarded since the inception of this scholarship

=== Linda S. Montross New Latin Educator Scholarships ===
Beginning in 2017, The National Latin Exam began giving out new scholarships to those interested in becoming a Latin teacher. High School seniors, college students, and those in a Master's Program may apply for the $2000 scholarships, which are renewable. One does not need to have ever taken the NLE to apply. Up to eight of these scholarships are awarded annually. As part of this scholarship, awardees are also assigned a mentor and their expenses paid to attend one American Classical League Institute within their first three years of teaching.

=== Sally Davis Graduate Scholarship ===
Students or teachers who are continuing their Latin or Greek on the post-graduate level are eligible to apply for one $2,000 scholarship awarded annually.

=== The Jane Harriman Hall Professional Development Scholarship ===
The Jane Harriman Hall Professional Development Scholarship program is designed to support teachers in their ability to teach Latin. The scholarship was developed in honor of Jane Harriman Hall, founder of the National Latin Exam, in order to continue her efforts to bring high quality Latin instruction to their students.

== See also ==
- National French Contest
- National Spanish Examinations
