= Cecelia Eaton Luschnig =

American college professor

- Born: Cecelia Anne Eaton; March 22, 1942; New York City, New York, US
- Died: June 19, 2022 (aged 80); Moscow, Idaho, US
- Other names: C. A. E. Luschnig
- Occupations: College professor, classics scholar, writer

Cecelia Anne Eaton Luschnig (March 22, 1942 – June 19, 2022) was an American classics scholar, translator, and writer. She was a professor at the University of Idaho.

== Early life and education ==
Cecelia Anne Eaton was born in New York City, the daughter of James C. "Jimmy" Eaton and Olive Findlay Eaton. She had two brothers. Her father was a club owner in Syosset. She graduated from Hunter College High School and the City College of New York. She completed doctoral studies at the University of Cincinnati, with a dissertation titled "The Logos-Ergon Conflict: A Study of Euripidean Tragedy" (1972).

== Career ==
Luschnig was a classics professor at the University of Idaho. She was a noted expert on Euripides. She received the American Philological Association Award for Excellence in Teaching. She was president of the Classical Association of the Pacific Northwest, and edited the association's newsletter. She was active in the classics honor society Eta Sigma Phi, and advised the society's University of Idaho chapter from 1975 to 2003.

== Publications ==
=== Books ===
- ETYMA: An Introduction to Vocabulary Building from Latin & Greek (1982, with Lance J. Luschnig)
- Etymidion: A Students' Workbook (1985)
- Tragic Aporia: A Study of Euripides’ Iphigenia at Aulis (1988)
- Time Holds the Mirror: A Study of Knowledge in Euripides’ Hippolytus (1988)
- The Gorgon’s Severed Head: Studies in Alcestis, Electra, and Phoenissae (1995)
- Euripides’ Alcestis: A Commentary (2003, with Hanna M. Roisman)
- The Worlds of Roman Women: A Latin Reader (2005, edited with A. R. Raia and J.L. Sebesta)
- Latin Letters; Reading Roman Correspondence (2006)
- An Introduction to Ancient Greek: A Literary Approach (2007)
- Granddaughter of the Sun: A Study of Euripides’ Medea (2007)
- Euripides’ Electra: A Commentary (2011, with Hanna M. Roisman)
- Electra, Phoenician Women, Bacchae, & Iphigenia at Aulis (2011, translated with Paul Woodruff)
- The Orestes Plays (2016)
- Three Other Theban Plays: Aeschylus' Seven against Thebes; Euripides' Suppliants; Euripides' Phoenician Women (2016)

=== Articles ===
- "Euripides' Trojan Women: All Is Vanity" (1971)
- "Euripides' Hecabe: The Time Is out of Joint" (1976)
- "Time and Memory in Euripides' Iphigenia at Aulis" (1982)
- "The Value of Ignorance in the Hippolytus" (1983)
- "Interiors: Imaginary Spaces in Alcestis and Medea" (1992)

== Personal life ==
Eaton married photographer Lance J. Luschnig in 1970. She died from cancer in 2022, at the age of 80, in Moscow, Idaho. She donated some of her papers to the University of Idaho Library.
