= Rank–Raglan hero archetype =

Hero archetype

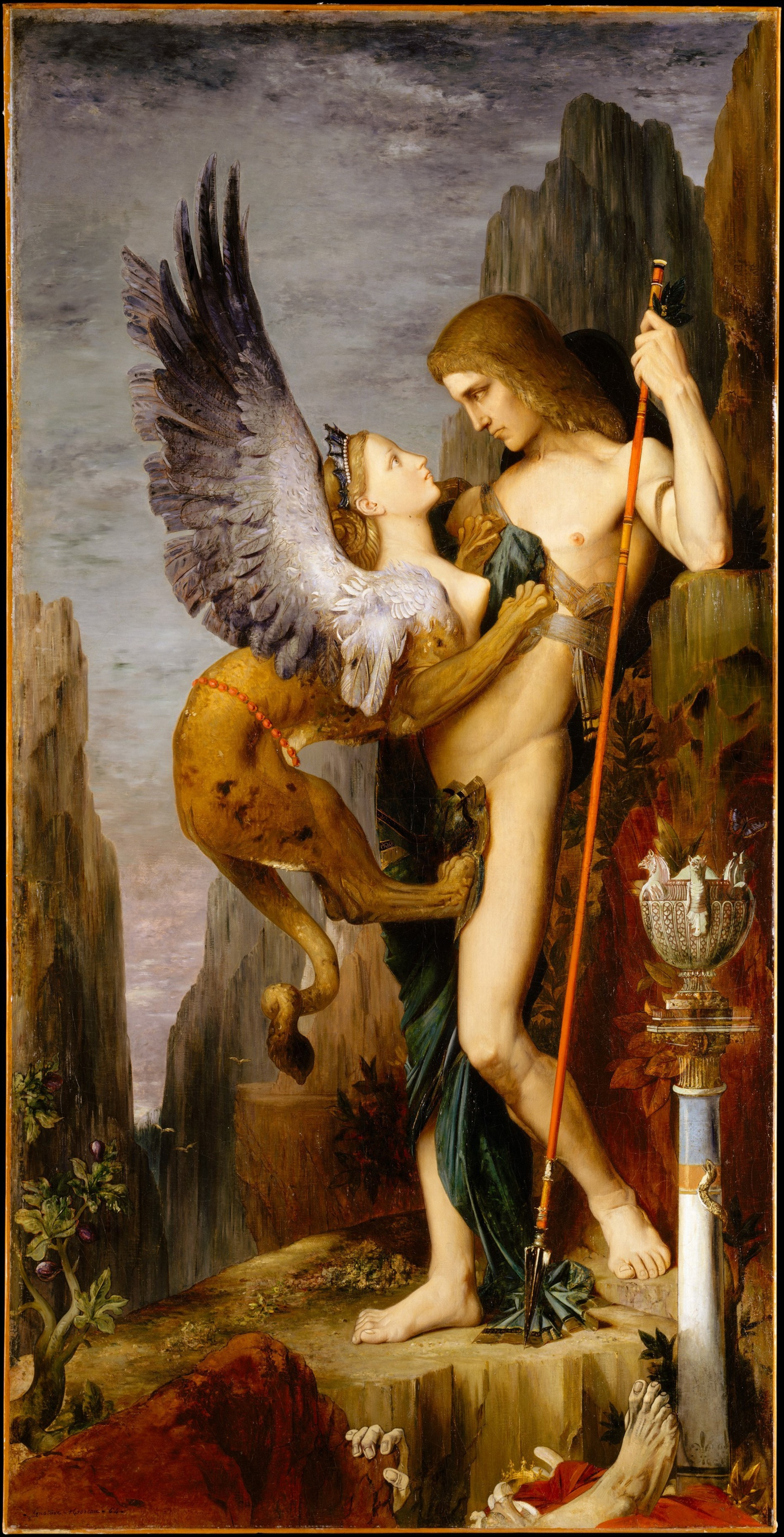
- Oedipus and the Sphinx by Gustave Moreau (1864)
- Field: Comparative mythology; Narratology; Folkloristics
- Origin: Otto Rank, The Myth of the Birth of the Hero (1909); Lord Raglan, The Hero (1936)
- Key people: Otto Rank; Lord Raglan; Alan Dundes; Robert A. Segal
- Purpose: Checklist of hero biography motifs, spanning birth, kingship, exile, and death

In narratology and comparative mythology, the Rank–Raglan hero archetype is a combined or independent set of narrative patterns proposed by the Austrian psychoanalyst Otto Rank and later on by the British amateur anthropologist Lord Raglan that list different cross-cultural traits often found in the accounts of heroes, including mythical heroes.

Otto Rank developed his concept of the "Mythic Hero" in his 1909 text, The Myth of the Birth of the Hero that was based on Freudian ideas. It includes a set of 12 traits that are commonly found in hero myth narratives. Lord Raglan developed his concept of the "Mythic Hero" as an archetype, based on a ritualistic interpretation of myth, in his 1936 book, The Hero, A Study in Tradition, Myth and Drama. It is a set of 22 common traits that he said were shared by many heroes in various cultures, myths and religions throughout history and around the world. Raglan argued that the higher the score, the more likely the figure's biography is mythical. Raglan did not categorically deny the historicity of the heroes he looked at, rather it was their common biographies he considered as nonhistorical.

Comparative mythologists have continued to deploy the checklist in teaching and research, with Jaan Puhvel adopting it as a baseline for Indo-European hero studies and Michael Witzel integrating its royal hero arc into a global survey of mythic kingship.

Scholars have criticized the Rank-Raglan scale's methodology, noting that while it automatically awards points to historical rulers due to their royal status, it was not designed to determine historicity. Scholars have debated how to consistently score hero biographies due to differing interpretations of the criteria. Rather, as folklorist Alan Dundes argues, it demonstrates how folk traditions shape biographical accounts of heroes along common narrative patterns, regardless of whether the figure actually existed.

== History ==
Developed independently, modern comparative myth scholar Robert A. Segal combined Rank's birth-myth schema with Raglan's life-course pattern. However, Raglan is the dominant scale when discussing hero-myth patterns.

=== Rank ===
In 1909, Otto Rank developed a hero birth pattern heavily influenced by the legend of Oedipus. Following Freudian "family romance" psychoanalytic theory, Rank's pattern focused on the hero's parental relationships and only covered the first half of the hero's life:

1. Child of distinguished parents
2. Father is a king
3. Difficulty in conception
4. Prophecy warning against birth
5. Hero surrendered to the water in a box
6. Saved by animals or lowly people
7. Suckled by female animal or humble woman
8. Hero grows up
9. Hero finds distinguished parents
10. Hero takes revenge on the father
11. Acknowledged by people
12. Achieves rank and honors

Rank closely analyzed birth myths for Sargon of Akkad, Moses, Karna, Oedipus, Paris, Telephos, Perseus, Dionysus, Gilgamesh, Cyrus the Great, Trakhan, Tristan, Romulus, Hercules, Jesus, Siegfried, Lohengrin, and Sceafa.

=== Raglan ===
In 1936, Lord Raglan developed a 22-point hero archetype pattern that identified common narrative elements found across Indo-European heroic traditions. Building on the work of myth-ritual theorists like James Frazer and S. H. Hooke, Raglan's framework aimed to systematically analyze the recurring motifs in hero stories:

1. Mother is a royal virgin
2. Father is a king
3. Father often a near relative to mother
4. Unusual conception
5. Hero reputed to be son of god
6. Attempt to kill hero as an infant, often by father or maternal grandfather
7. Hero spirited away as a child
8. Reared by foster parents in a far country
9. No details of childhood
10. Returns or goes to future kingdom
11. Is victor over king, giant, dragon or wild beast
12. Marries a princess (often daughter of predecessor)
13. Becomes king
14. For a time he reigns uneventfully
15. He prescribes laws
16. Later loses favor with gods or his subjects
17. Driven from throne and city
18. Meets with mysterious death
19. Often at the top of a hill
20. His children, if any, do not succeed him
21. His body is not buried
22. Has one or more holy sepulchers or tombs

When Raglan's 22 point outline is used, a Hero's tradition is considered more likely to be mythical the more of these traits they hold (a point is added per trait). Raglan himself scored the following heroes: Oedipus (21 or 22 points), Theseus (20 points), Romulus (18 points), Heracles (17 points), Perseus (18 points), Jason (15 points), Bellerophon (16 points), Pelops (13 points), Dionysos (19 points), Apollo (11 points), Zeus (15 points), Joseph (12 points), Moses (20 points), Elijah (9 points), Watu Gunung (18 points), Nyikang (14 points), Sigurd (11 points), Lleu Llaw Gyffes (17 points), King Arthur (19 points), Robin Hood (13 points), and Alexander the Great (7 points).

==== Modern analysis ====
Classicist Thomas J. Sienkewicz analyzed additional heroes using Raglan's pattern, including Mithridates VI of Pontus (22 points), Krishna (21 points), Jesus (18 points), Mohammad (17 points), Beowulf (15 points), Buddha (15 points), Czar Nicholas II (14 points), Samson (13 points), Sunjata, the Lion-King of Ancient Mali (11 points), Achilles (10 points), and Harry Potter (8 points).

Additionally, in 1999, Sienkewicz analyzed female figures against Raglan's pattern, including Penelope (13 points), Helen of Troy, Guinevere (11 points), Joan of Arc (13 points), Hero in Shakespeare's Much Ado about Nothing (10 points), Princess Diana, Princess Leia (12 points), Tori Amos (15 points), Nefertiti (13 points), Cleopatra (13 points), Irene of Athens, Susan B. Anthony (12 points), Helen Keller, Harriet Tubman, Sacagawea, Semiramis, Antigone, Jane Addams, and Marie de' Medici, with most female candidates scoring lower than mythic male heroes and fulfilling traits differently, illustrating both flexibility and cultural limitations of the pattern.

== Reception ==
Comparative mythologists continue to employ the Rank–Raglan checklist as a descriptive framework for heroic biography. Jaan Puhvel presented the combined pattern as a baseline for Indo-European hero studies, and Michael Witzel integrated its royal birth, exile, and death sequence into his global survey of mythic kingship. Alan Dundes' scoring method in In Quest of the Hero continued to circulate in classrooms and comparative religion surveys, reinforcing the hero archetype's utility for cross-cultural comparison.

Raglan's framework influenced later studies of hero myth patterns. As Segal noted in his introduction to In Quest of the Hero, a notable parallel development was the "monomyth" concept developed by Joseph Campbell in his seminal work The Hero with a Thousand Faces (1949). While Campbell's work shared some similarities with the approaches of Otto Rank and Lord Raglan, he did not cite or acknowledge their work in his book, instead drawing primarily from Carl Jung's analytical psychology to analyze heroic narratives across world religions and mythologies. Segal concisely summarizes the key differences between these theorists:

The theories of Rank, Campbell, and Raglan typify the array of analyses of hero myths. For Rank, the true subject of hero myths is the family. For Campbell, it is the mind. For Raglan, it is the physical world and, even more, the gods who control that world.

Both Rank and Campbell read myth symbolically. Because the real subject of hero myths for Rank is the family, the figures in a hero myth symbolize the mythmaker or reader and his parents. It is, then, confusing for Rank to identify the hero with the ego—as if the hero's parents represent other parts of the mind. Because the real subject of hero myths for Campbell is the mind, figures in a hero myth symbolize parts of the mythmaker's or reader's mind: the ego and the archetypes of the collective unconscious.

By contrast to both Rank and Campbell, Raglan reads myth literally. Stories about heroes are really about heroes. While Raglan relentlessly impugns the historicity of heroes, he takes for granted that stories about them are meant literally. While Raglan equates heroes with gods, heroes for him do not symbolize gods. They are gods.

— Robert Segal

The 1990 anthology In Quest of the Hero drew favorable reviews for preserving Rank and Raglan's essays alongside Dundes' operational analysis. Richard S. Caldwell called the collection "a magnificent idea" for mythology courses, William G. Doty praised it as a "masterful short review" of hero pattern scholarship, and Jonathan Z. Smith recommended it as a compact map of twentieth-century debates. H. R. Ellis Davidson likewise described the volume as essential for understanding hero studies, and Burton L. Mack highlighted its clarity for readers sorting through competing theories.

=== Criticism ===
The Rank–Raglan hero archetype draws sustained criticism for resting on contested psychoanalytic and myth-ritualist premises, for treating dependent and ambiguously worded traits as independent data, for privileging royal male biographies that travel poorly across cultures, and for inflating cumulative scores into claims about historicity. Recent analysts respond by tightening coding rules and grounding comparisons in explicit source criticism, as when Allen reorganizes Raglan's items into a sequenced cycle and Witzel situates the pattern within a broader survey of royal hero narratives.

Folklorist Alan Dundes observed that Raglan never categorically denied the historical existence of any of the heroes, instead he was gauging the biographical pattern which he believed stemmed from ritual regicide. Furthermore, Dundes noted that Raglan himself had admitted that his choice of 22 incidents, as opposed to any other number of incidents, was arbitrarily chosen. Though Lord Raglan took stories about heroes as literal and even equated heroes with gods, Otto Rank took stories as symbolic.

Folklorist Francis Utley tested Raglan's hero pattern by applying it to Abraham Lincoln, John F. Kennedy, Winston Churchill, Napoleon and William Wallace. His critique argues that these historical figures matched the mythological pattern closely, proving that the pattern could not reliably separate myth from historical fact.

New Testament researcher James McGrath argues that fictional non-royal figures will score low on the scale and thus would be misclassified as "historical", while historical rulers will start off with a number of points automatically which would make them more likely to be misclassified as "mythical", for instance, Czar Nicholas II was historical and scores high and Harry Potter is clearly fictional and yet scores lower. Since the Rank and Raglan scales depend on the narratives about individuals, there is also an inherent problem in that sources will depict the same individual in a contradictory light as in the case of political figures who have supporters and opponents who wish to push contradictory narratives.

Christopher Hansen notes that selection bias is a major problem in using hero patterns to assess any useful information on historical figures, their lives, or the narratives that exist in the historical record. Furthermore, he states that numerous cases of dubious usage can be identified and that the archetype points are so generic that "they could probably apply to an average ruler with a problematic birth".
