= Michele Valerie Ronnick =

American philologist

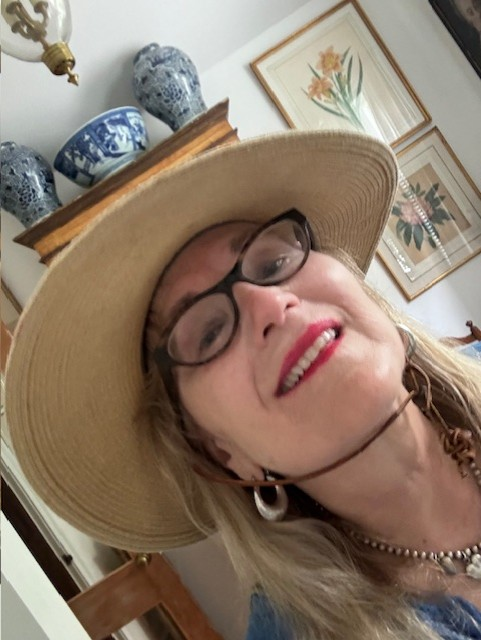
- Born: Westerly, Rhode Island
- Occupations: Philologist, author and academic

Academic background
- Education: BA., Classics and Sociology; MS., Library Science; MA., Latin; PhD., Classical Studies
- Alma mater: University of South Florida; Florida State University; University of Florida; Boston University

Academic work
- Institutions: Wayne State University

Michele Valerie Ronnick is an American philologist, author and academic. She is a Distinguished Service Professor in the College of Liberal Arts and Sciences at Wayne State University.

Ronnick is known for her studies in classical philology and reception studies of ancient and modern figures such as John Gower, John Milton, Edgar Allan Poe, Herman Melville, T.S. Eliot, Gertrude Stein, Gwendolyn Brooks, Audre Lorde, Sarah Ruhl, Tom Stoppard, and David Lynch. Her publications comprise journal articles, chapters and books including Cicero's Paradoxa Stoicorum: A Commentary, an Interpretation, and a Study of Its Influence, Band 62 in the series Studien zur klassischen Philologie, The Autobiography of William Sanders Scarborough: An American Journey from Slavery to Scholarship, for which she won the 2006 Outreach Award from the American Philological Association, The Works of William Sanders Scarborough: Black Classicist and Race Leader, and William Sanders Scarborough's First Lessons in Greek: A Facsimile of the 1881 First Edition.

Ronnick has received teaching and scholarship awards such as the 1994 Classical and Modern Literature's Incentive Award for Younger Scholars, the 2017 Lifetime Achievement and Service Award from Eta Sigma Phi, the Classical Association of the Middle West and South's 2018 Outstanding Promotional Activity Award, the Inaugural Ambassador Award from the Southern Conference on African American Studies in 2019, the 2021 American Classical League's Merita Award and the 2024 Emerita Award from the Michigan Classical Consortium.

For her work on William Sanders Scarborough, Ronnick was awarded the "Key to the City of Macon, Georgia," a proclamation from Bibb County, Georgia, and March 12, 2005, named in her honor by the city of Sarasota, Florida. She is an Honorary Lifetime Member of the Classical Association of New England and serves on the advisory board of EOS Africana Reception.

== Education ==
Ronnick graduated from Sarasota High School in 1972 and earned a BA in Classics and Sociology from the University of South Florida in 1975. She went on to complete an MS in Library Science at Florida State University in 1977, followed by an MA in Latin at the University of Florida in 1986, and a PhD in Classical Studies at Boston University in 1990.

== Career ==
Ronnick joined Wayne State University in 1993, initially as an assistant professor, and later became associate professor in 1996. In 2007, she was appointed professor and has been serving as distinguished service professor since 2021.

At Wayne State University, Ronnick has served as an advisory board member of the Humanities Center and also on the Academic Senate. In 2007, she organized the "Second Annual Tribute to Scarborough," where WSU students presented ideas and read excerpts from Scarborough's writings at WSU's David Adamany Undergraduate Library.

Ronnick has been engaged with professional associations such as the Classical Association of the Middle West and South (CAMWS) where she was president (2009–2010), and has served on various CAMWS committees including the Merit Committee, the History Committee and the Ladislaus J. Bolchazy Pedagogy Book Award Committee. She was twice president of the Michigan Classical Consortium, and is a member of the membership committee for the American Classical League and the editorial board of Anthem Press.

== Contributions ==
Ronnick has contributed to her field through the establishment of Black classicism, also known as Classica Africana and Afro-Classicism. In 1994, she published her first article on the subject, titled "The Latin Quotations in the Correspondence of Edward Wilmot Blyden," in The Negro Educational Review. In 1999, she conceptualized this new field with an entry titled "Classicism, Black, in the United States." She defined Black classicism as "the history and analysis of the influence of Greco-Roman civilization on the professional and creative lives of people of African descent", and her definition was reissued in 2005 and in 2006 on the website of the Oxford African American Studies Center.

In the late 1990s, Ronnick discovered a 368-page manuscript in Ohio by William Sanders Scarborough (1852–1926). Scarborough was enslaved in his youth and became later a foundational African American philologist. The manuscript had remained unpublished for many decades. The manuscript was published with introduction, notes, and photographs as The Autobiography of William Sanders Scarborough: An American Journey from Slavery to Scholarship, which details Scarborough's rise from enslavement in Macon, Georgia to becoming a prominent African American scholar. Ronnick then compiled Scarborough's publications written between 1875 and 1926 for The Works of William Sanders Scarborough: Black Classicist and Race Leader. In the foreword, Henry Louis Gates Jr. underscored Scarborough's importance to African American intellectual life, stating, "If W. E. B. Du Bois, the antecedent of today's black public intellectuals, himself has an antecedent, it is W. S. Scarborough, the black scholar." In 2019, she reissued William Sanders Scarborough's First Lessons in Greek: A Facsimile of the 1881 Edition, which is the earliest foreign language textbook by an African American.

In 1996, Ronnick organized the first panel on Black classicism. It was presented in New York City at the annual meeting of the American Philological Association (renamed as the Society for Classical Studies (SCS). The panel led to the formation of Eos, a group formed by the SCS in 2017 dedicated to studying the interaction, interpretation, and reception of Graeco-Roman antiquity by people of African descent. In 2000, Ronnick's article confirmed Scarborough as the first black member of the Modern Language Association (MLA), leading to the establishment of the MLA William Sanders Scarborough Book Prize, an annual prize given in honor of important new scholarly works in African American studies. Additionally, in 2019, the American School of Classical Studies at Athens created the William Sanders Scarborough Fellowship to support the study of the classical world by underrepresented students in Greece.

In the early 2000s, Ronnick created a photo installation titled 12 Black Classicists to illustrate the history of African American engagement with classical studies through their portraits. First displayed in September 2003 at the Detroit Public Library, it has since been expanded to include additional portraits. It has been exhibited in 78 locations across the United States, the United Kingdom, and Canada, with a 79th exhibition at California State University, Sacramento. She described the installation's impact: "With them begins the serious study and teaching of philology by African Americans. All who study language and literature in the U.S. today, be it Italian, Swahili, Sanskrit, English, or Arabic, trace the origin of their disciplines to the men and women featured in this photo installation."

== Media ==
Ronnick's discovery and edition of William Sanders Scarborough's autobiography has been featured in media outlets, including The University of Michigan Record, The Detroit News, Ebony, Washington Post, and the Chronicle of Higher Education. Her efforts to highlight black classicists have also been documented by BU Today, Times Literary Supplement, CBC Radio, and The Guardian.

== Awards and honors ==
- 1994 – Incentive Award for Younger Scholars, Classical and Modern Literature
- 2002 – Ovatio, Classical Association of the Middle West and South
- 2005 – Key to the City of Macon, Bibb County, Georgia
- 2017 – Lifetime Achievement and Service Award, Eta Sigma Phi
- 2018 – Outstanding Promotional Activity Award, Classical Association of the Middle West and South
- 2019 – Ambassador Award, Conference on African American Studies
- 2021 – Merita Award, American Classical League
- 2024 – Emerita Award, Michigan Classical Consortium

== Bibliography ==
=== Books ===
- Cicero’s Paradoxa Stoicorum: A Commentary, an Interpretation, and a Study of Its Influence (1991) ISBN 978-3-631-42446-9
- The Autobiography of William Sanders Scarborough: An American Journey from Slavery to Scholarship (2004) ISBN 978-0-8143-3224-5
- The Works of William Sanders Scarborough: Black Classicist and Race Leader (2006) ISBN 978-0-19-530962-1
- William Sanders Scarborough's First Lessons in Greek: A Facsimile of the 1881 Edition (2019) ISBN 978-0-86516-863-3

=== Selected articles ===
- Ronnick, M. V. (1992). Buck Mulligan's Latin in “Ulysses”, 14.705-10: Ciceronic Not Ciceronian. Arion: A Journal of Humanities and the Classics, 2(1), 217–221.
- Ronnick, M. V. (1994). The Latin Quotations in the Correspondence of Edward Wilmot Blyden. The Negro Educational Review, 45(3), 101–106.
- Ronnick, M. V. (1997). Res Gestae 25: Damnatio Memoriae as a Strategy of Rhetoric. Maia: Rivista di letterature classiche, 49(3), 381–384.
- Ronnick, M. V. (1998). Francis Williams: An Eighteenth-Century Tertium Quid. Negro History Bulletin, 61(2), 19–29.
- Ronnick, M. V. (1999). The meaning and method of Milton's panegyric of Cromwell in the Pro Populo Anglicano Defensio Prima. Humanistica Lovaniensia, 48, 307–316.
- Ronnick, M. V. (2000). William Sanders Scarborough: The First African American Member of the Modern Language Association. PMLA, 115(7), 1787–1796.
- Ronnick, M. V. (2005). Versace's Medusa: (capita)lizing upon classical antiquity. Helios, 32(2), 173–182.
- Ronnick, M. V. (2014). ‘Saintly Souls’: White Teachers’ Advocacy and Instruction of Greek and Latin to African American Freedmen. In T. Ramsby & S. Bell (Eds.), Free at Last! The Impact of Freed Slaves on the Roman Empire, 177–95.
- Ronnick, M. V. (2019). A look at Herbert P. J. Marshall and Do Somethin' Addy Man! or The Black Alcestis, Theatre Royal, Stratford East (1962). In E. Olechowska & D. Movrin (Eds.), Classics & communism in theatre: Graeco-Roman antiquity on the communist stage (pp. 45–59, 309–317).
- Ronnick, M. V. (2021). In Search of Helen Maria Chesnutt (1880–1969), Black Latinist. New England Classical Journal, 48(1), 110–121.

== Art: Works and writings ==
=== Catalogues and installations ===
- Ronnick, M. V. (2023). Penelope rediviva: Emma Amos's classical weave. In E. Renia (Ed.), Emma Amos: Classical Legacies (Catalogue essay). New York, NY: Ryan Lee Galleries.
- Black Classicists: A Mural Mosaic, Center for Hellenic Studies, Permanent Collection, Harvard University, Washington, D.C.

=== Selected articles ===
- Ronnick, M. V. (1997). The meaning of ‘Mascon’ words: An image from Greek drama in Henry Louis Gates Jr.’s Literary theory and the Black tradition. Res Publica Litterarum, 20, 203–206.
- Ronnick, M. V. (2002). New Tanner document. The International Review of African American Art, 18, 53–54.
