= The Myth of the Birth of the Hero =

Book by Otto Rank

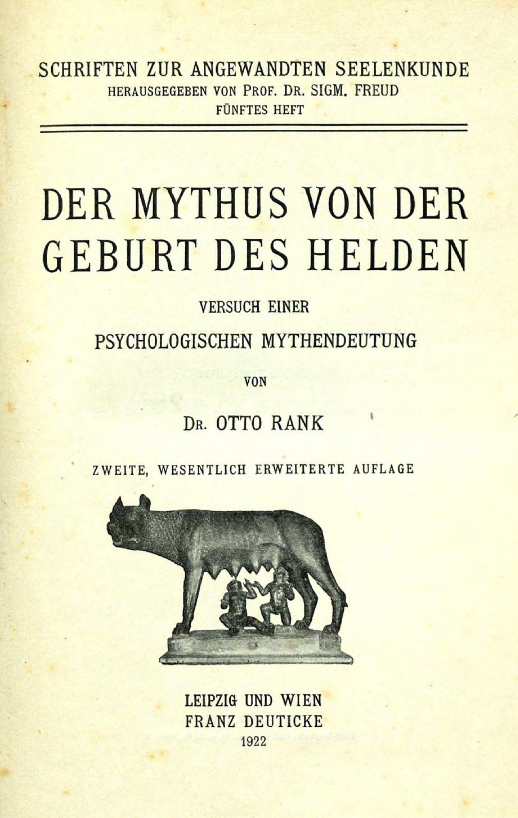
- Cover for the 1922 German edition
- Author: Otto Rank
- Original title: Der Mythus von der Geburt des Helden
- Translator: E. Robbins and Smith Ely Jelliffe (1914 translation); Gregory C. Richter and E. James Lieberman (2004 translation)
- Language: German
- Published: 1909 (1st ed. in German); 1914 (1st ed. in English); 1922 (2nd ed. in German); 2004 (2nd ed. in English)
- Publication place: Germany

The Myth of the Birth of the Hero (German: Der Mythus von der Geburt des Helden) is a book by Austrian psychoanalyst Otto Rank in which the author puts forth a psychoanalytical interpretation of mythological heroes, specifically with regard to legends about their births. The first edition of the book was published in 1909, and a greatly expanded second edition was published in 1922. The work was later translated into English in 2004 by Gregory C. Richter and E. James Lieberman.

== Summary ==
The Myth of the Birth of the Hero comprises three parts (the first two sections were originally published in 1909, and the final section was added when the work was republished in 1922). In the first section, Rank introduces his topic of investigation, noting: "Whatever one’s opinion as to their origin, one is struck by an insistent tendency in the myths to make all heroic figures fit the framework of a specific birth legend." He then emphasizes "the role played by unconscious psychosexual life in myth formation." In the work's second section, Rank closely analyzes mythes about the births of Sargon of Akkad, Moses, Karna, Oedipus, Paris, Telephos, Perseus, Dionysus, Gilgamesh, Cyrus the Great, Trakhan, Tristan, Romulus, Hercules, Jesus, Sigurd, Lohengrin, and Sceafa. In the final section, Rank lays out a rough outline that he claims can be applied to almost all mythical birth stories:

The hero is the child of very distinguished parents, and usually the son of a king. His origin is preceded by difficulties, such as sexual abstinence, prolonged infertility, or secret intercourse of the parents due to external prohibition or obstacles. During or before the pregnancy, a prophecy, in the form of a dream or oracle, warns against his birth, usually threatening harm to the father. Therefore the newborn child, usually at the instigation of the father or his representative, is doomed to be killed or exposed. As a rule, he is surrendered to the water, in a box. He is then saved by animals, or by lowly people (herders), and suckled by a female animal or a lowly woman. After he has grown up, he finds his distinguished parents in a variety of ways. He takes revenge on his father, on the one hand, and is acknowledged, on the other, achieving greatness and fame.

== Publication history ==
The first edition of The Myth of the Birth of the Hero was published in 1909 by Franz Deuticke. An English translation of this edition (translated by E. Robbins and Smith Ely Jelliffe) was later issued in 1914 as an eighteenth entry in the "Nervous and Mental Disease" monograph series by the Nervous and Mental Disease Publishing Company. An expanded second edition was published in German by Franz Deuticke in 1922. This edition remained officially unavailable in English until 2004, when a version translated by Gregory C. Richter and E. James Lieberman was published by the Johns Hopkins University Press.

== Reception ==
Kaës René, writing in The International Dictionary of Psychoanalysis, called The Myth of the Birth of the Hero a "'cornerstone' of the psychoanalytic study of mythology," which "open[ed] up original perspectives in the methodological approach to the problem of the formation and function of myths."

== See also ==
- Joseph Campbell's Hero with a Thousand Faces (1949)
- James George Frazer's The Golden Bough (1890–1915)
- The Rank–Raglan mythotype
