= Thomas J. Sienkewicz =

American classicist

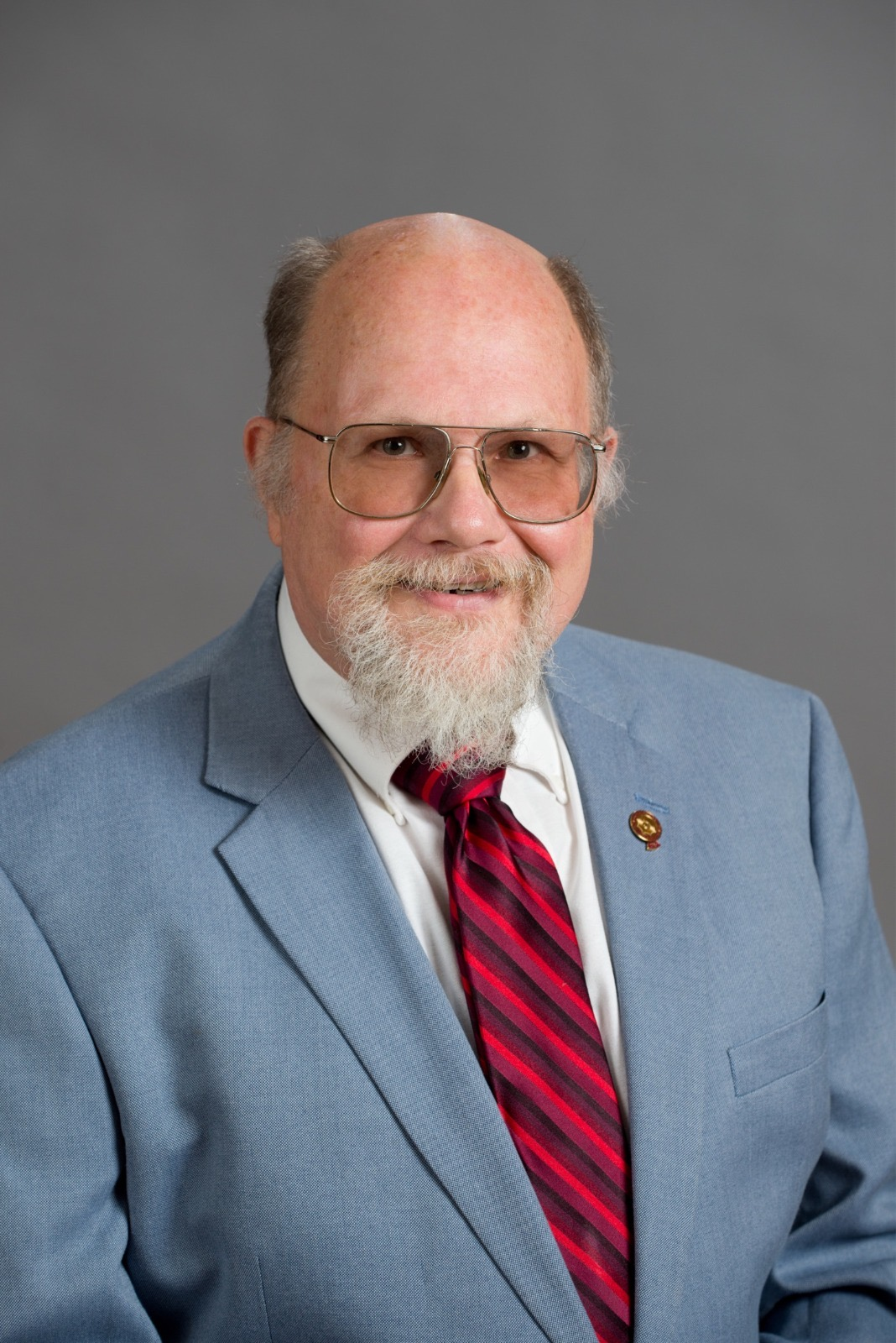
- Sienkewicz in 2025
- Born: April 29, 1950 (age 76); Hoboken, New Jersey, U.S.
- Education: College of the Holy Cross (BA); Johns Hopkins University (MA, PhD)
- Occupations: Classicist; academic; author
- Website: tomsienkewicz.com

Thomas J. Sienkewicz is an American classicist, academic, and author. He is the Minnie Billings Capron Professor Emeritus of Classics at Monmouth College. He has also served as secretary-treasurer of the Classical Association of the Middle West and South (CAMWS).

== Early life and education ==
Sienkewicz was born on April 29, 1950, in Hoboken, New Jersey. He attended St. Peter's Preparatory School in Jersey City, New Jersey, from 1964 to 1968.

Sienkewicz graduated from the College of the Holy Cross with a Bachelor of Arts, summa cum laude, in classics in 1971. As an undergraduate, he also studied at the Aegean Institute in Poros, Greece, in 1970. He then obtained an M.A. in classics in 1973 and his Ph.D. in classics in 1975 from Johns Hopkins University. His doctoral dissertation, completed under Marsh McCall of Stanford University, was titled, "Euripides' Trojan Women: An Interpretative Study based upon the Role of the Chorus and Ironic Development".

During his doctoral studies, he was supported by a National Defense Education Act (NDEA) Graduate Fellowship at Johns Hopkins (1971–1974), and conducted dissertation and archaeological research in Paris, France, in 1973.^{[}

== Career ==
Sienkewicz worked as a graduate instructor at Johns Hopkins University for a year, between 1974 and 1975. For the next ten years, he was employed at Howard University, where he served as Assistant Professor from 1975 to 1981, rising to the rank of Associate Professor before his departure in 1985. During his time at Howard, he served in several administrative roles, including Acting Chairman of the Department of Classics during the summers of 1978 and 1980.

During the academic year 1984-85 he was a visiting professor at Monmouth College where he was appointed the Minnie Billings Capron Chair in Classics in 1985. He was chair of the Monmouth College Classics Department from 1984 until his retirement in 2017, when he was named Emeritus of Classics.”

He served as Coordinator of Off-Campus Studies at Monmouth College from 1993 to 1995 and again from 1998 to 2010, and as Faculty Secretary from 1994 to 2005.

In 1984, Sienkewicz founded the Western Illinois Society of the Archaeological Institute of America, which has since hosted hundreds of archaeological lectures at Monmouth College His department at Monmouth College, along with the Western Illinois Society of the Archaeological Institute of America, established the Thomas and Anne Sienkewicz Lecture on Roman Archaeology in 2017 to honor his and his wife's contributions to the field. Beyond Monmouth, he served as a Visiting Faculty Member at a National Endowment for the Humanities (NEH) Summer Institute on "Homer and Oral Traditions" at the University of Arizona in 1994, and as Visiting Director of the Associated Colleges of the Midwest (ACM) Florence in the Arts Programs in 1992–93, returning as Visiting Professor in 2011.

Sienkewicz was president of the Illinois Classical Conference from 1988 to 1990 and executive secretary of Eta Sigma Phi from 2003 to 2011. He was Secretary-Treasurer of CAMWS and business manager of The Classical Journal from 2012 to 2020 He is a member of the Board of Directors for the Warren County History Museum.”

In 2019 he gave the 34th annual Bernice L. Fox Classics Lecture at Monmouth College. The title of his presentation was “Hercules Poliiticus: The Mythic Hero as Political Role Model from Alexander the Great to Vladimir Putin"

== Teaching ==
Sienkewicz taught all levels of Latin and Greek language throughout his career, as well as a broad range of interdisciplinary courses including Classical Mythology and Star Wars, Africa and Blacks in Antiquity, Sport and Recreation in the Ancient World, Women in Classical Mythology, The Ancient Novel, and Sacred Places. At Howard University, he taught Renaissance and modern literature as part of the university's general education program, and participated in Honors Program instruction at both Howard University and Monmouth College.

The American Philological Association recognised his contributions to pedagogy with its Award for Excellence in the Teaching of Classics at the College Level in 1989, its highest educational honour in the field.

== Works ==
His first book, Classical Gods and Heroes in the National Gallery of Art (1983), was a handbook connecting artworks in the National Gallery of Art to themes from Greco-Roman mythology, published by the University Press of America.

In 1991, Sienkewicz co-authored, with Viv Edwards, a book titled Oral Cultures Past and Present: Rappin' and Homer. This work examined oral traditions across six continents and 3,000 years. J.T. Hooker, in his review of the book, found the material "enlightening"; however, he also critiqued the author's attempt to tie Homer closely to modern oral forms like rap, and further suggested that similarities were "incidental," not structural. Additionally, Ruth Finnegan's review of the book framed it as "lively", "sensible" and "informative", however, also somewhat "naive in places", precisely due to lesser engagement with recent literary and anthropological theory. In the same year, he also published, The Classical Epic: An Annotated Bibliography. This work was an annotated guidance on Homer’s Iliad and Odyssey and Vergil's Aeneid.

Sienkewicz’s 1996 publication, World Mythology: An Annotated Guide to Collections and Anthologies, was focused on global myths. It featured annotated entries, indexes, and a focus on cultural traditions. Paolo Villani appreciated Sienkewicz's efforts in "summarizing a single volume the broad range of myth-related materials from all over the world", however, he also highlighted "gaps in the bibliographical entries" in some research areas. Marianne Cawley also reviewed the book and commended Sienkewicz's efforts in coming up with a "clear, concise, and to the point" write-up. His book Theories of Myth: An Annotated Bibliography presented English-language studies of myth theory, highlighting myth's function and interpretation across cultures.

In 1999, he co-edited the World Dictionary of Foreign Expressions with James McDonough Jr., a reference work originally compiled by Gabriel Adeleye and Kofi Acquah-Dadzie, published by Bolchazy-Carducci. The volume was reviewed in the Library Journal and covered by the Chicago Sun-Times and the Chicago Daily Herald.

Sienkewicz edited the Encyclopedia of the Ancient World, which explored global cultures from prehistory to 700 CE. Clay Williams remarked it as a useful resource for "high school students and first- or second-year college students". However, he also noted the "lack of depth" in many articles. The book was also reviewed by Abigail F. Ellsworth, who described the content of the book as "timely and well-written" and a "must-have for libraries of every sort" due to its finding aids. In collaboration with LeaAnn Osburn, he authored Vergil: A Legamus Transitional Reader, which underscored the structured readings, resources, and centered on authentic Vergilian texts. In her review of the book, Edith Foster praised the authors for their thoughtful organization of pedagogical components. He also co-authored the book Disce! – An Introductory Latin Course with Kenneth Kitchell. In 2022 with Jinyu Li he edited and contributed to Ovid in China: Reception, Translation, and Comparison, exploring Ovid's influence in China through historical, literary, and cultural lenses with a focus on translation and thematic comparisons.

More recently, Sienkewicz has continued to contribute to collaborative scholarship through edited volumes and thematic publications. In 2026, he co-edited, with Jeff Rankin, Urbanfest: A Collection of Writings in Honor of William L. Urban, a festschrift celebrating the contributions of the medieval historian William L. Urban. The same year, he edited Practice of Religious Media in the Twenty-First Century, a special issue of the journal Religions published by MDPI, bringing together interdisciplinary research on the evolving role of digital media, communication technologies, and religious practice in the contemporary world. These publications illustrate the continuing breadth of his scholarly interests, ranging from classical reception and medieval history to religion, media, and cultural studies.

In 2007, Sienkewicz edited the Encyclopedia of the Ancient Greek World, a companion reference volume to his earlier Encyclopedia of the Ancient World, also published by Salem Press.

He served as series editor, with Kenneth Kitchell, of the LEGAMUS Transitional Readers series published by Bolchazy-Carducci, covering Latin authors including Vergil (2004), Catullus (2006), Ovid (2008), Horace (2008), Cicero (2010), and Plato (2010). The series was designed to bridge the transition between introductory Latin study and the reading of original authors.

In 2012, he co-edited The Power of Place: A Festschrift for Janet Goodhue Smith with Robert Timothy Chasson, published by the Associated Colleges of the Midwest.

== Media appearances ==
Sienkewicz made several appearances in national and regional media discussing the relevance of classical studies. On July 6, 2001, he appeared on National Public Radio's The Connection, broadcast on WBUR Boston, in a segment titled "Latin Renaissance". On December 6, 1999, he appeared on Milton Rosenberg's Extension 720 on WGN Chicago.On September 17, 2009, he was a guest on Colin McEnroe's nationally syndicated programme on WNPR, speaking on making the classics relevant in the 21st century.

== Awards and honors ==
Sienkewicz has received awards including Lifetime Achievement Award from Eta Sigma Phi, and an ovatio and Special Service Award from the Classical Association of the Middle West and South (CAMWS). Monmouth College and the Western Illinois Society of the Archaeological Institute of America established the Thomas and Anne Sienkewicz Lecture on Roman Archaeology in 2017 to honor his and his wife's contributions to the field.

- 1971 – NDEA Graduate Fellowship, The Johns Hopkins University
- 1976 – Phi Beta Kappa, Hopkins Chapter
- 1982 – Honorary Fellowship, Institute for Advanced Studies in the Humanities, University of Edinburgh
- 1989 – Awards for Excellence in Collegiate Teaching, Society for Classical Studies
- 1991 – Burlington-Northern Award for Outstanding Teaching and Professional Development
- 1993 – Lieutenant Governor's Award, Illinois Council on the Teaching of Foreign Languages
- 1995 – CAMWS Outstanding State Vice-President
- 1997 – CAMWS Outstanding Regional Vice-President
- 2002 – Ovatio and Special Service Award from the Classical Association of the Middle West and South
- 2005 – Hatch Distinguished Faculty Award for Scholarship, Monmouth College
- 2012 – Hatch Distinguished Teaching Award, Monmouth College
- 2014 – Lifetime Achievement Award, Illinois Classical Conference
- 2014 – Meritus Award, American Classical League
- 2014 – Lifetime Achievement Award, Eta Sigma Phi
- 2015 – Hatch Distinguished Service Award, Monmouth College

== Bibliography ==
=== Books ===
- Sienkewicz, Thomas J. (1983). Classical Gods and Heroes in the National Gallery of Art. University Press of America. ISBN 978-0-8191-2967-3.
- Sienkewicz, Thomas J. (1983). Classical gods and heroes in the National Gallery of Art. University Press of America. ISBN 9780819129673.
- Edwards, Viv; Sienkewicz, Thomas J. (1991). Oral Cultures Past and Present: Rappin' and Homer. Blackwell Pub. ISBN 9780631165699.
- Sienkewicz, Thomas J. (1991). The Classical Epic: An Annotated Bibliography. Salem Press. ISBN 9780893566630.
- Sienkewicz, Thomas J. (1996). World Mythology: An Annotated Guide to Collections and Anthologies. Salem Press. ISBN 9780810831544.
- Sienkewicz, Thomas J. (1997). Theories of Myth: An Annotated Bibliography. Scarecrow Press. ISBN 9780810833883.
- Adeleye, Gabriel; Acquah-Dadzie, Kofi (1999). World Dictionary of Foreign Expressions. Edited by Thomas J. Sienkewicz and James McDonough Jr. Bolchazy-Carducci Publishers. ISBN 978-0-86516-422-2.
- Sienkewicz, Thomas J. (2002). Encyclopedia of the Ancient World. Salem Press. ISBN 9780893560386.
- Sienkewicz, Thomas J.; Osburn, LeaAnn A. (2004). Vergil: A Legamus Transitional Reader. Bolchazy-Carducci Publishers. ISBN 9780865165786.
- LEGAMUS Transitional Readers Series. Series editors: Sienkewicz, Thomas J.; Kitchell, Kenneth (2004–2010). Bolchazy-Carducci Publishers. Volumes: Vergil (2004), Catullus (2006), Ovid (2008), Horace (2008), Cicero (2010), Plato (2010).
- Sienkewicz, Thomas J. (2007). Encyclopedia of the Ancient Greek World. Salem Press. ISBN 978-1-4381-1020-2.
- Sienkewicz, Thomas J.; Kitchell, Kenneth (2011). Disce! – An Introductory Latin Course. Savvas Learning Company. ISBN 9780205823345.
- Chasson, Robert Timothy; Sienkewicz, Thomas J. (2012). The Power of Place: A Festschrift for Janet Goodhue Smith. Associated Colleges of the Midwest.
- Liu, Jinyu; Sienkewicz, Thomas J. (2022). Ovid in China: Reception, Translation, and Comparison. Verlag Ferdinand Schöningh. ISBN 9789004467286.

=== Selected articles ===
- Sienkewicz, Thomas J.; Genung, D.; Ihlendorf, C.; Robertson, S. (1999). "Latin Teaching Standards: Process, Philosophy, and Application". The Classical Journal. 95 (1): 55–63. JSTOR 3298234.
- Sienkewicz, Thomas J.; Mulberry, Alice; Reaves, Patricia; Kann, Elizabeth; Bell, Barbara (2004). "Lingua Latina Liberis: Four Models for Latin in the Elementary School". The Classical Journal. 99 (3): 301–312.
- Sienkewicz, Thomas J. (2018). "Experiencing and Teaching Pilgrimage in a Sacred Spaces Course". Religions. 9 (4): 102. doi:10.3390/rel9040102.
- Sienkewicz, Thomas J. (2023). "Greek to Me: A Memoire of Academic Life by Richard Clogg". The Classical Journal. 118 (4): 477–479. doi:10.1353/tcj.2023.0013.
- Sienkewicz, Thomas J. (2024). "Secretary Treasurer: 2012–2020". The Classical Journal. 120 (2): 149–158. doi:10.1353/tcj.2024.a947785.
- A Tale of Two Epics: Homer's Odyssey and the West African Sunjata," in Sienkewicz, Thomas J. and Jeff Rankin (eds), Urbanfest: A Collection of Writings in Honor of William L. Urban, Monmouth, IL: 2026, pp. 292-310
- "Scenes from Ovid's Metamorphoses on Four 18th-Century Chinese Export Porcelain Punchbowls," in Sienkewicz, Thomas J. and Liu, Jinyu (eds), Ovid in China: Reception, Translation and Comparison, Leiden: Brill, 2022, pp, 88–109
- The Greeks Are Too Like the Others: The Sunjata epic of West Africa" in Myth and Polis, edited by John Wickersham and Dora Pozzi Cornell University Press, 1991. Reviewed by Daniel P. Tompkins in Bryn Mawr Classical Review 3.2 (1992), 152-157.
