= American Classical League =

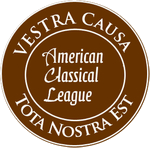
- ACL official seal
- Abbreviation: ACL
- Formation: 1919
- Type: Professional, educational
- Legal status: Non-profit
- Purpose: Classical studies
- Headquarters: 860 NW Washington Blvd., Suite A Hamilton, Ohio, Ohio 45013
- Location(s): United States Canada
- Coordinates: 39°30′25.25″N 84°44′42.75″W
- President Vice President Programs Vice President Membership Secretary Treasurer: Jennie Luongo; Mark Pearsall; Traci Dougherty; Sue Robertson; Debra Heaton
- Affiliations: National Junior Classical League; Junior Classical League state chapters National Senior Classical League
- Website: aclclassics.org

Founded in 1919, the American Classical League (ACL) is a professional organization which promotes the study of classical civilization at all levels of education in the United States and Canada. Teachers of Latin, Ancient Greek and the Classics account for the majority of its membership, though the ACL is open to any person interested in preserving the language, literature and culture of both Ancient Rome and Ancient Greece. Currently based in Hamilton, Ohio, the league publishes and provides hundreds of teaching aids; runs a national placement service for teachers of Latin and Greek; sponsors the National Latin Examination (NLE); functions as the parent organization of both the National Junior Classical League (NJCL) and National Senior Classical League (NSCL); and annually holds a convention — the Annual Institute — to promote excellence in the teaching of classical studies. The ACL also encourages and supports ongoing dialogue with other classical and modern language associations.

== Allied organizations ==
- Society for Classical Studies (SCS)
- American Council on the Teaching of Foreign Languages (ACTFL)
- Archaeological Institute of America (AIA)
- Classical Association of the Middle West and South (CAMWS)
- Center for Hellenic Studies (CHS)

== See also ==
- National Latin Exam (NLE)
- National Junior Classical League (NJCL)
  - Junior Classical League state chapters
  - Certamen (quiz bowl)
- National Senior Classical League (NSCL)
