= National Senior Classical League =

- NSCL official emblem
- Abbreviation: National SCL, NSCL
- Formation: 1960
- Type: Educational, service
- Legal status: Non-profit
- Purpose: Classical studies
- Location: United States
- President: Jake Presson
- Vice-President: Jameson Sheehy
- Secretary: Allie Kratochvil
- Treasurer Parliamentarian Editor Historian Advisor: Nic Collier; Alden Okoh-Aduako; Lucas Colson; Reesey Lai; Bennett Henkel
- Parent organization: American Classical League
- Affiliations: National Junior Classical League
- Website: nscl.org

The National Senior Classical League (National SCL or NSCL) is an organization – mostly of college students – which promotes the study, appreciation and advancement of the Classics. It is the college-level affiliate of the National Junior Classical League (NJCL), and both organizations are sponsored by the American Classical League (ACL). Many graduates of NJCL go on to be members in NSCL; high school seniors on the cusp are known as "Slashers" – a reference to their status as "JCL/SCL" members. The organization also awards an annual scholarship to a Classics major, in hopes of producing capable Classics teachers for the future.

Every year, members of the NSCL attend the NJCL convention to assist with and oversee some parts of the convention. The group's main contributions during the week are the administration of the Olympika sporting events; the daily publication of the Convention Ear, a humorous newsletter; and the production of "That's Entertainment", a talent show for JCL members, hosted and featuring skits by SCL members. While SCL members may attend the JCL General Assembly meetings, the SCL also holds separate meetings and elects officers during the week. These meetings are open to slashers as well.

== Purpose ==
According to the NSCL Constitution, the objectives of the organization are as follows:

- To enhance and promote the appreciation of the classics and classical scholarship in postsecondary education
- To advise, encourage, and help the Junior Classical League.

== Creed and Song ==
NSCL Creed
We, the members of the Senior Classical League, strive to promote the study of Greek, Latin, and ancient cultures. We believe this study will help us examine the world and expand our understanding of literature, language, arts, sciences, and humanity.

We affirm the SCL experience develops responsibility, fosters community, promotes enthusiasm, encourages competition, inspires dedication and enriches our total growth.

NSCL Song
Seeking to learn, with wisdom our goal,
looking for lessons through stories of old,
searching the realms of the ancient past,
we study the classics' works so vast.

In knowledge, truth, and fellowship,
we're growing every day;
the iron fist of SCL aids in every way.

We'll join our arms and sing along
with every dear colleague,,
and forever we'll hold
to the Purple and Gold
of the Senior Classical League.

== Officers ==
Listed below are the current NSCL Officers (as of July 25, 2026).

Office	Officer
President	Jake Presson
Vice-President	Jameson Sheehy
Secretary	Allie Kratochvil
Treasurer	Nic Collier
Parliamentarian	Alden Okoh-Aduako
Editor	Lucas Colson
Historian	Reesey Lai
Advisor	Bennett Henkel

== State chapters ==
As of 2020, current State Chapters of the NSCL:

- Alabama SCL
- California SCL
- Florida SCL
- Georgia SCL
- Illinois SCL
- Indiana SCL
- Kentucky SCL
- Louisiana SCL
- Maine SCL
- Maryland SCL
- Massachusetts SCL
- Ohio SCL
- Oklahoma SCL
- Ontario SCL
- Pennsylvania SCL
- Texas SCL
- Virginia SCL
- Wisconsin SCL

== See also ==
- Eta Sigma Phi - collegiate honor society/co-ed fraternity for Latin, Greek, and Classics majors
