= National Junior Classical League =

Student organization

- NJCL official emblem
- Abbreviation: National JCL, NJCL
- Formation: 1936
- Type: Educational, service
- Legal status: Non-profit
- Headquarters: 860 NW Washington Blvd Suite A Hamilton, Ohio 45013
- Location: USA
- Coordinates: 39°30′17.75″N 84°44′59.50″W
- Region served: Worldwide
- Members: 45,771
- President 1st Vice-President 2nd Vice-President Comm. Coord. Parliamentarian Historian Editor: Olivia Chen; Srushti Gudipati; Aurelia Shaitelman; Angela Wu; Sarah Pati; Bani Gourab; Shreyas Karnam
- Committee Chair: Todd Wegenhart
- Parent organization: American Classical League
- Affiliations: National Senior Classical League
- Website: njcl.org

The National Junior Classical League (National JCL or NJCL) is a youth organization of secondary school students sponsored and organized by the American Classical League (ACL). Founded in 1936, the NJCL comprises more than 1,000 Latin, Greek and Classical chapters in the United States, Canada, South Korea and the United Kingdom, and with over 45,000 members, is the largest Classical organization in the world today. Its mission is "to encourage an interest in and an appreciation of the language, literature and culture of ancient Greece and Rome and to impart an understanding of the debt of our own culture to that of classical antiquity."

NJCL official colors are Roman purple and gold. It sponsors a Latin Honor Society and Greek Honor Society for high school students.

== History ==
The idea of creating a junior organization to the American Classical League was first proposed in 1927 at the organization's annual meeting. A committee was appointed to study the matter, but it decided two years later that it wouldn't be worth pursuing at the time. In 1936, a pin was made and lifetime membership cost thirty cents, as it was decided to pursue the creation of a junior organization. The Junior Classical League was announced in November 1936 in Classical Outlook, with headquarters being established at New York University.

Today, chapters exist in the United States, Canada, and Australia and has over 50,000 members.

== National convention ==
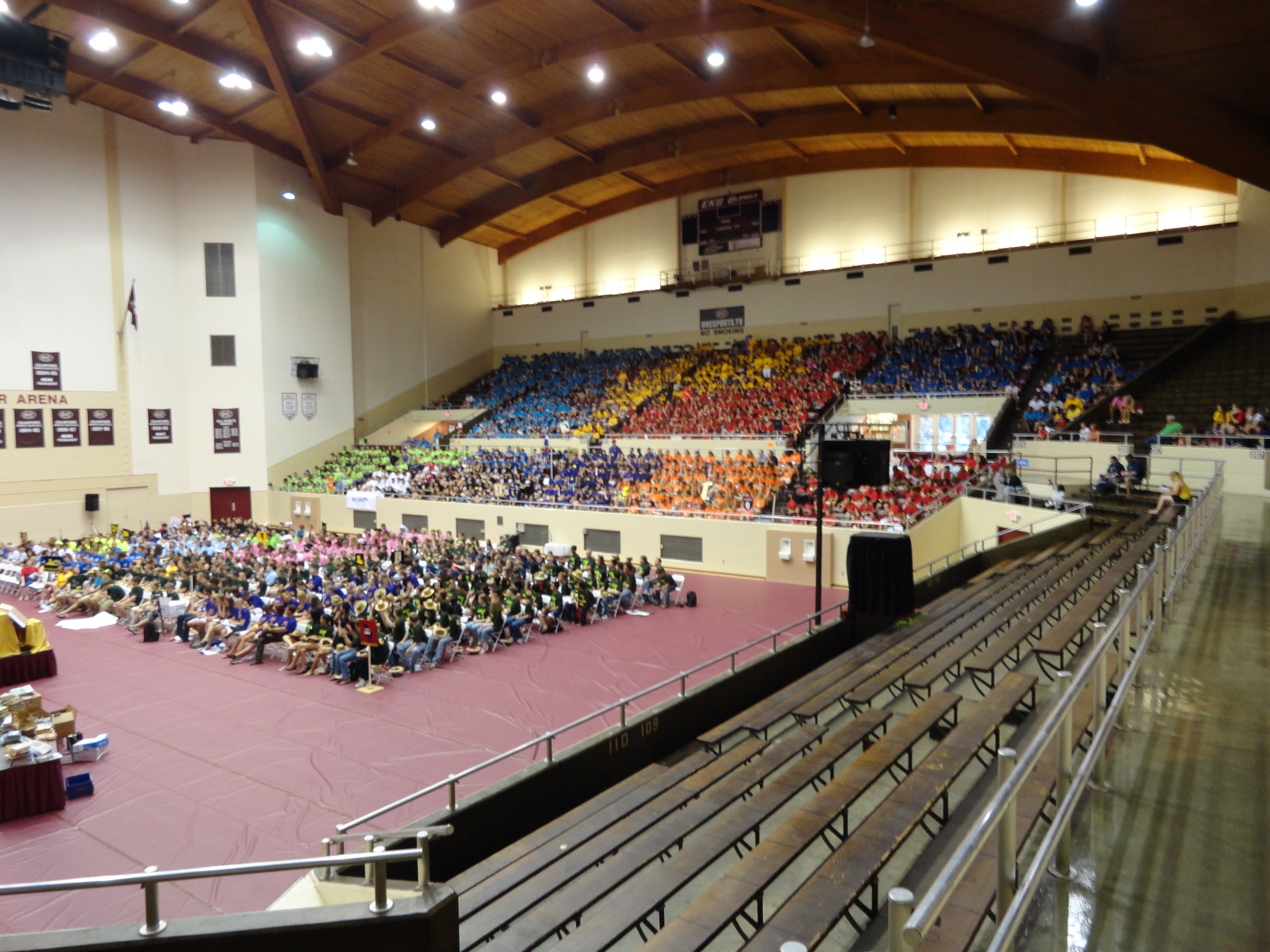
2011 General Assembly at Eastern Kentucky University, looking at convention participants

The NJCL hosts a week-long national convention annually at a college campus in late July or early August, where 1200–1500 students compete in academic tests, graphic and creative arts competitions, and meet many classics students from around the country.

Other components of the convention in which students may participate include Certamen, a quizbowl-like trivia competition, seminars commonly known as Colloquia, and Ludi (literally "games"—various athletic and recreational events). Students may also campaign for public offices within the NJCL, including President, Treasurer, and Historian. Starting regularly in 1972, every convention is given a motto/theme from Latin poetry or literature. A theme for the following year's convention is chosen by the incoming president each year.

Most state-level NJCL chapters hold their own annual conventions at locations central to their attendees, where schools compete in varied events. These events are divided into academic levels for scoring purposes; participation can be countywide, regional, or even statewide. Awards are given out to schools based on sweepstakes points, earned by placing high in competitive events.

The 2018 national convention was held at Miami University in Oxford, Ohio from July 23–28. The 2019 national convention was held at North Dakota State University in Fargo, North Dakota from July 26–31. The 2020 national convention was held digitally due to the COVID-19 pandemic from July 24–29. Likewise, the 2021 NJCL was digital, held The NJCL convention returned to in person meetings in 2022, when members met July 24-29. The 2022 NJCL returned to in person assembly for the 24-30 July NJCL at the University of Louisiana in Lafayette, Louisiana. In 2023, members returned to Emory University in Atlanta, GA 23-28 July. In 2024, the NJCL convention met just a few hours away at the University of Tennessee, Knoxville from July 22-27. In 2025, the NJCL returned to Miami University in Oxford, Ohio for its July 21-26 meeting. The 2026 NJCL convention will meet once again at Indiana University, Bloomington from July 21-26. The 2027 site will be the College of William and Mary.

== State chapters ==
As of 2025, 44 U.S. states, the District of Columbia, one Canadian province, and the United United Kingdom and South Korea each maintain a state (or state-level) chapter of the NJCL. Many chapters hold their own annual State Convention in addition to the National Convention.

== Publications ==
Torch: U.S. is the NJCL's official publication, which details the events of the organization, reports scores, and issues stories. Published four times a year, the only issue sent to all convention attendees (including non-subscribers) is the fall issue, shortly after convention.

Until October 2007, the NJCL also published JCL Highlights in months when the Torch: U.S. was not published. JCL Highlights publicized administrative details about the League, including details about applying for JCL scholarships, information about the upcoming Convention, and requests for information from NJCL officers and national committee members. According to the Fall 2007 Torch: U.S., the National Committee decided at the October 2007 Fall Planning Meeting to eliminate the JCL Highlights in favor of online distribution of the same information.

During national conventions, a student published newspaper, The Convention Ear, is produced. The Ear highlights convention events and gives information about candidates for NJCL office.

== See also ==
- National Senior Classical League (NSCL) – The college-level affiliate of NJCL
- Living Latin – A movement dedicated to promoting spoken Latin
- Ontario Student Classics Conference – An annual conference begun in 1968 which has roots in the National Junior Classical League.
