= Endorsements in the 2017 United Kingdom general election =

  - 2010 general election
  - Endorsements
  - 2015 general election
  - Endorsements
  - 2017 general election
  - Endorsements
  - 2019 general election
  - Endorsements
  - 2024 general election
  - Endorsements

Various newspapers, organisations and individuals endorsed parties or individual candidates for the 2017 general election.

== Endorsements for parties ==
=== Newspapers and magazines ===
==== National daily newspapers ====
Newspapers	Endorsement	Notes	Link
Daily Express	Conservative Party		
Daily Mail	Conservative Party		
Daily Mirror	Labour Party		
Daily Star	None		
The Daily Telegraph	Conservative Party		
Financial Times	Conservative Party		
The Guardian	Labour Party	Prioritised tactical voting against the Conservatives, including votes for Liberal Democrats and Greens.	
The Guardian	Various (Scotland)	In Scotland: supported opposition to the Conservatives, either SNP or Labour.	
i	None		
The Independent	None	Backed Labour's Shadow Secretary of State for Exiting the European Union Keir Starmer to negotiate Brexit. Supported unionist candidates in Northern Ireland, Scotland and Wales.	
Metro	None		
Morning Star	Labour Party		
The Sun	Conservative Party		
The Times	Conservative Party		

==== National Sunday newspapers ====
Newspaper	Endorsement	Notes	Link
The Mail on Sunday	Conservative Party		
The Observer	None	Endorsed voting against the Conservatives and for candidates opposing austerity and a hard Brexit.	
Sunday Express	Conservative Party		
Sunday Mirror	Labour Party		
The Sunday People	None	Endorsed tactical voting against the Conservatives.	
The Sun on Sunday	Conservative Party		
The Sunday Telegraph	Conservative Party		
The Sunday Times	Conservative Party		

==== National weekly newspapers ====
Newspaper	Endorsement	Notes	Link
The New European	None	Endorsed voting against the Conservatives and UKIP and for candidates that support a second EU referendum, although the guide also advised voting for Pro-EU Labour and Conservative politicians such as Kenneth Clarke, unless the Liberal Democrats had a chance of winning the seat.	
Socialist Worker	Labour Party		
The New Worker	Labour Party		
Weekly Worker	Labour Party		

==== National political magazines ====
Newspaper	Endorsement	Notes	Link
New Statesman	Labour Party		
The Economist	Liberal Democrats	This was the Economist's first endorsement of a non-dominant party in the publication's history.	
The Spectator	Conservative Party		
Tribune	Labour Party		
Socialist Standard	Socialist Party of Great Britain		

==== Other national publications ====
Newspaper	Endorsement	Notes	Link
DIY	Labour Party	Monthly music magazine.	
Kerrang!	Labour Party	Weekly rock music magazine.	
NME	Labour Party	Weekly music magazine.	

==== Scottish newspapers ====
Newspaper	Endorsement	Notes	Link
Daily Record	Labour Party	Supported voting for the SNP in SNP/Conservative marginal seats.	
The National	Scottish National Party		
The Scottish Sun	Scottish National Party		
Sunday Herald	Scottish National Party		

==== Northern Irish newspapers ====
Newspaper	Endorsement	Notes	Link
Irish News	None	Supported candidates who oppose a hard Brexit.	
The News Letter	Ulster Unionist Party	Supported unionists. Opposes an SDLP-supported Corbyn coalition at a national level, but opposes Sinn Féin more.	
The News Letter	Democratic Unionist Party	Supported unionists. Opposes an SDLP-supported Corbyn coalition at a national level, but opposes Sinn Féin more.	

==== Local publications ====
Newspaper	Endorsement	Location	Link
City A.M.	Conservative Party	Greater London and surrounding area.	
Evening Standard	Conservative Party	Greater London.	
Express & Star	Conservative Party	West Midlands and Staffordshire.	
The Plymouth Herald	None	West Devon, South East Cornwall and South Hams.	
Yorkshire Post	None	Yorkshire.	

=== Individuals ===
==== Conservative Party ====
- Carl Benjamin, aka Sargon of Akkad, YouTube commentator.
- Douglas Carswell, Independent MP for Clacton since 2005, formerly of the UK Independence Party and the Conservatives.
- Jim Davidson, comedian.
- Tim Dawson, screenwriter.
- Geoff Downes, musician in The Buggles and Yes.
- Sean Gabb, writer and director of the Libertarian Alliance
- Andy Goode, former rugby union footballer.
- Chloe Goodman, model and television personality.
- Andy Jordan, reality television personality.
- Jodie Marsh, television personality, bodybuilder and model.
- John McCririck, horse racing pundit.
- Rod Stewart, singer.
- Georgia Toffolo, reality television personality.
- Anne Marie Waters, political activist. (endorsed both Conservatives and UKIP).

==== Green Party of England and Wales ====
- Rebecca Atkinson-Lord, theatre director and writer (endorsing the Greens, Liberal Democrats and Labour).
- Michaela Coel, poet, singer-songwriter, screenwriter and actress (endorsing the Greens and Labour).
- Matt Haig, novelist and journalist.

==== Labour Party ====
- Afrikan Boy, grime MC.
- Akala, rapper and poet.
- Olly Alexander, singer, songwriter and actor.
- Lily Allen, singer-songwriter.
- Anthony Anaxagorou, poet and writer.
- Jacob Anderson, aka Raleigh Ritchie, actor, singer-songwriter, rapper, and record producer.
- James Anderson, actor.
- László Andor, Hungarian economist.
- Nonso Anozie, actor.
- Daniele Archibugi, Italian economic and political theorist.
- Alexander Arnold, actor.
- Jason Arnopp, novelist and scriptwriter.
- Rebecca Atkinson-Lord, theatre director and writer (endorsing the Greens, Liberal Democrats and Labour).
- Rhea Bailey, actress.
- Danny Baker, comedy writer, journalist, radio DJ and screenwriter.
- Dean Baker, American macroeconomist.
- Frances Barber, actress.
- Joey Barton, footballer.
- Gaz Beadle, reality television personality.
- Beardyman, multivocalist, musician and comedian.
- Brace Belden, American volunteer with the People's Protection Units (YPG).
- Andy Bell, musician.
- Tony Bellew, boxer.
- Sean Biggerstaff, actor and musician.
- Stephen Billington, actor.
- Lethal Bizzle, rapper and actor.
- David Blanchflower, economist.
- Jon Bounds, writer and blogger.
- David Bowers, animator, director, screenwriter and voice actor.
- Russell Brand, comedian, actor, radio host and activist.
- Louise Brealey, actress, writer and journalist.
- Rachel Bright, actress.
- Thom Brooks, political philosopher and legal scholar.
- Omari Caro, rugby league footballer.
- Ha-Joon Chang, economist.
- Neil Claxton, musician.
- Noam Chomsky, American linguist, philosopher and political activist.
- Stanley Chow, artist and illustrator.
- Alexa Chung, model, fashion designer, television presenter and writer.
- Emilia Clarke, actress.
- Clean Bandit, classical crossover band.
- John Cleese, comedian, actor (endorsing the Liberal Democrats and Labour).
- Sam Clemmett, actor.
- Michaela Coel, poet, singer-songwriter, screenwriter and actress (endorsing the Greens and Labour).
- Roger Cohen, journalist.
- Neil Cole, presenter, comedian, broadcaster and actor.
- Karl Collins, actor.
- Steve Coogan, comedian, impressionist, screenwriter and producer.
- Beckii Cruel, pop dancer and singer.
- Hal Cruttenden, comedian.
- Delilah, singer-songwriter.
- Dan Croll, singer-songwriter.
- Alan Davies, comedian, writer and actor.
- Rob Delaney, comedian
- Charlotte Devaney, DJ, producer, singer, dancer and actress.
- Danny DeVito, American actor.
- Rori Donaghy, refugee and labour related issues researcher.
- Siobhán Donaghy, singer and member of Mutya Keisha Siobhan.
- Shaun Dooley, actor.
- Danny Dorling, social geographer.
- Lena Dunham, actress and writer.
- Ade Edmondson, comedian, actor and writer.
- Beatie Edney, actress.
- Ben Elton, comedian, author and actor.
- Esben and the Witch, rock band.
- Jeff Faux, American economist.
- Mehmet Ferda, actor.
- Noel Fielding, comedian, actor and television presenter.
- Ben Fine, economist.
- Charlie Fink, singer-songwriter, producer and filmmaker.
- Heiner Flassbeck, German economist and public intellectual.
- Dawn Foster, journalist, broadcaster and author.
- Four Tet, musician.
- Frankie & The Heartstrings, indie rock band.
- Mat Fraser, rock musician, actor and writer.
- Sadie Frost, actress, producer and fashion designer.
- James K. Galbraith, American economist.
- Liam Gallagher, singer, former member of Oasis.
- Nitin Ganatra, actor.
- Guy Garvey, lead singer of Elbow.
- Tony Gardner, actor and doctor.
- Ricky Gervais, comedian, actor and director.
- Annabel Giles, television and radio presenter.
- David Gilmour, rock musician.
- Kerry Godliman, comedian and actress.
- Ben Goldacre, physician, academic and science writer (endorsing the Liberal Democrats and Labour).
- Goldie, musician and DJ.
- Neil Grainger, actor and comedian.
- Professor Green, rapper.
- John Grahl, academic.
- Sofie Hagen, comedian.
- Geoff Harcourt, Australian economist.
- Jonathan Harden, actor.
- Simon Hattenstone, journalist and writer.
- Richard Hawley, musician.
- Stephen Hawking, theoretical physicist.
- Julie Hesmondhalgh, actress.
- Susan Himmelweit, economist.
- Michael Holt, professional snooker player.
- Hookworms, psychedelic rock band.
- Rufus Hound, comedian.
- Jonathan L. Howard, writer and game designer.
- London Hughes, comedian, television writer and presenter.
- Jessica Hynes, actress and writer.
- Eddie Izzard, actor and comedian.
- Jermain Jackman, singer.
- JME, grime MC.
- Holly Johnson, musician.
- Owen Jones, author, newspaper columnist and commentator.
- Kero Kero Bonito, British-Japanese pop trio.
- Mushtaq Khan, heterodox economist.
- Soul Khan, musician.
- Killer Mike, rapper, member of Run the Jewels.
- Lawrence King, sociologist and political economist.
- Costas Lapavitsas, Greek economist and former Popular Unity politician.
- Luke Lennon-Ford, sprinter.
- The Libertines, rock band.
- Limmy, comedian, actor and web developer (endorsed the SNP in Scotland).
- Sally Lindsay, actress and television persenter.
- Ken Loach, film director and political activist.
- Josie Long, comedian.
- Lowkey, rapper and activist.
- Sabrina Mahfouz, poet, playwright and performer.
- Jason Manford, comedian.
- Ian Martin, writer.
- Francesca Martinez, comedian.
- Paul Mason, journalist and broadcaster.
- Massive Attack, trip-hop duo.
- Holly Matthews, actress.
- Liz May Brice, actress.
- Maxsta, grime MC.
- Tyrone McCarthy, professional rugby league footballer.
- Paul McGann, Eighth Doctor in Doctor Who.
- Alan Mehdizadeh, actor.
- Kerry-Anne Mendoza, editor-in-chief of The Canary.
- M.I.A., rapper, record producer and activist.
- Jonathan Michie, economist.
- Mark Millar, comic book writer.
- Ann Mitchell, actress
- George Monbiot, writer and environmentalist.
- Jack Monroe, writer and campaigner (also supporting the Green Party and the National Health Action Party).
- Alan Moore, comic book writer and novelist.
- Christopher Moore, American comic fantasy writer.
- Mark Moraghan, actor and singer.
- Samantha Morton, actress, screenwriter and director.
- Richard Murphy, chartered accountant and political economist.
- Kate Nash, musician.
- Robert Neild, economist.
- Jason Netherton, former professional rugby league footballer.
- Alison Newman, actress.
- Novelist, grime MC.
- Panjabi MC, musician.
- Ronnie O'Sullivan, professional snooker player.
- David Owen, former leader of the Social Democratic Party.
- Kai Owen, actor.
- Richard Parker, American economist.
- Tamaryn Payne, actress.
- Maxine Peake, actress.
- Ann Pettifor, analyst and economist.
- Kate Pickett, epidemiologist.
- PINS, rock band.
- Plastician, electronic musician.
- Primal Scream, rock band.
- Robert Pollin, American economist.
- Sophie Porley, actress.
- Billie JD Porter, journalist and television presenter.
- David Preece, goalkeeper.
- Dave Prentis, general secretary of UNISON.
- Rag'n'Bone Man, singer-songwriter.
- Eddi Reader, singer-songwriter (endorsed both Labour and SNP).
- Vanessa Redgrave, actress.
- Reverend and the Makers, rock band.
- Rizzle Kicks, hip hop duo.
- Rou Reynolds, lead vocalist of Enter Shikari.
- Lizzie Roper, actress.
- Nadia Rose, rapper.
- Michael Rosen, children's novelist and poet.
- Ellie Rowsell, lead vocalist of Wolf Alice.
- Robert Rowthorn, economist.
- Mark Ruffalo, actor.
- Bill Ryder-Jones, musician
- S-Endz, vocalist, producer and songwriter.
- Alfredo Saad-Filho, Marxian economist.
- Zack Sabre Jr., professional wrestler.
- Sabrepulse, chiptune musician.
- Bernie Sanders, US Senator and 2016 Democratic Party presidential candidate.
- Emmett J. Scanlan, actor.
- David Schneider, actor, comedian.
- Mohammed Shafiq, chief executive of the Ramadhan Foundation.
- Anwar Shaikh, economist.
- Asad Shan, actor, model and presenter.
- Caroline Sheen, actress.
- Ariane Sherine, stand-up comedian, writer and journalist.
- Enter Shikari, rock band.
- Mista Silva, musician.
- Andrew Simms, author and analyst.
- Slix, grime MC, former member of Ruff Sqwad.
- Barry Sloane, actor.
- Harry Leslie Smith, writer, activist, World War II veteran and political commentator.
- Neville Southall, former Welsh international footballer.
- Guy Standing, economist.
- Hollie Steel, singer and actress.
- Frances Stewart, developmental economist.
- Joseph Stiglitz, former chief economist of the World Bank.
- Stormzy, grime MC.
- Summer Camp, indie pop duo.
- Sundara Karma, indie band.
- Scotty T, reality television personality.
- Eddy Temple-Morris, DJ, record producer and television presenter.
- Ashley Theophane, professional boxer.
- This Is the Kit, musician.
- Joseph Thompson, actor.
- TomSka, writer, producer, director, actor, and filmmaker.
- Polly Toynbee, journalist and writer.
- AJ Tracey, grime MC.
- Chris van Tulleken, doctor and TV presenter.
- Yanis Varoufakis, former Greek Minister of Finance and economist.
- Johnny Vegas, actor and comedian.
- Ava Vidal, comedian.
- Dua Lipa, singer-songwriter.
- Terri Walker, singer-songwriter.
- Dave Ward, General Secretary of the Communication Workers Union
- Samuel West, actor and director.
- Vivienne Westwood, fashion designer.
- Richard G. Wilkinson, social epidemiologist, author and advocate.
- Scot Williams, actor, writer and producer.
- Hannah Witton, YouTuber, broadcaster and author.
- Samantha Womack, actress.
- Wolf People, psychedelic rock band.
- Simon Wren-Lewis, economist.
- Gary Younge, writer and columnist.
- Bilal Zafar, comedian.
- Slavoj Žižek, philosopher, cultural critic, and Hegelian Marxist.
- Zomby, electronic musician.

==== Liberal Democrats ====
- Rebecca Atkinson-Lord, theatre director and writer (endorsing the Greens, Liberal Democrats and Labour).
- Samantha Bond, actress.
- Adam Christopher, novelist.
- John Cleese, actor, screenwriter, producer and comedian (endorsing the Liberal Democrats and Labour).
- Paul Connew, former editor of the Sunday Mirror.
- Richard Dawkins, ethologist, professor, evolutionary biologist and author.
- Dinesh Dhamija, business entrepreneur.
- Peter Frankopan, historian.
- Bob Geldof, singer-songwriter, author, political activist.
- Clare Gerada, former Chair of the Council of the Royal College of General Practitioners.
- Ben Goldacre, physician, academic and science writer (endorsing the Liberal Democrats and Labour).
- Hugh Grant, actor
- Robert Harris, novelist and former Labour donor.
- Nicola Horlick, investment fund manager.
- Rachel Johnson, editor, journalist, television presenter and author. Sister to the then Foreign Secretary Boris Johnson.
- Bob Marshall-Andrews, Labour MP for Medway from 1997 to 2010.
- Megaman, member of the So Solid Crew.
- Alex Proud, entrepreneur.
- Jay Rayner, journalist, writer, broadcaster, food critic and jazz musician.
- Richard Reed, co-founder, Innocent Drinks.
- John Rentoul, journalist.
- Roy Stride, lead singer of Scouting for Girls.

==== Plaid Cymru ====
- Rhodri Lloyd, rugby league player.

==== Scottish National Party ====
- Limmy, comedian, actor and web developer (endorsed Labour outside of Scotland).
- Eddi Reader, singer-songwriter (endorsed Labour outside of Scotland).

==== UK Independence Party ====
- Anne Marie Waters, political activist (endorsed both Conservatives and UKIP).

==== Sinn Féin ====
- James McClean, professional footballer

=== Organisations ===
==== Conservative Party ====
- Leave.EU (have also endorsed candidates of other parties in some specific constituencies)

==== Labour Party ====
- Alliance for Workers' Liberty (AWL)
- Associated Society of Locomotive Engineers and Firemen (ASLEF)
- Bob Crow Brigade
- Communication Workers Union (CWU)
- Communist Party of Britain
- Fire Brigades Union (FBU)
- General, Municipal, Boilermakers and Allied Trade Union (GMB)
- The Hemp Trading Company
- Left Unity
- National Union of Rail, Maritime and Transport Workers (RMT)
- Ninja Tune
- Odd Box Records
- Public and Commercial Services Union
- Stop the War Coalition
- Trade Union and Socialist Coalition (TUSC)
- Union of Shop, Distributive and Allied Workers (USDAW)
- Unite the Union
- University and College Union (UCU)

=== Parties ===
Some parties which only contest elections in certain parts of the United Kingdom have endorsed political parties in areas they don't contest.

- The Liberal Democrats (standing in Great Britain) and Alliance Party of Northern Ireland (standing in Northern Ireland) endorsed each other.
- Workers Revolutionary Party endorsed Labour in constituencies they are not contesting.

== Endorsements for individual candidates ==
=== Aberavon ===
For Stephen Kinnock (Labour):

- More United
- Ross Kemp, English actor, author and investigative journalist.

=== Amber Valley ===
For Nigel Mills (Conservative):

- UKIP local party

=== Arfon ===
For Hywel Williams (Plaid Cymru):

- Democracy in Europe Movement 2025

=== Ashfield ===
For Gloria De Piero (Labour):

- More United

=== Banbury ===
For Roseanne Edwards (Independent):

- National Health Action Party

=== Barrow and Furness ===
For John Woodcock (Labour Co-operative):

- More United

=== Bassetlaw ===
For John Mann (Labour):

- Leave.EU

=== Belfast East ===
For Gavin Robinson (DUP):

- Loyalist Communities Council, umbrella group backed by the three main loyalist paramilitary organisations: Ulster Defence Association, the Ulster Volunteer Force and the Red Hand Commando

For Naomi Long (Alliance):

- Open Britain

=== Belfast North ===
For Nigel Dodds (DUP):

- Loyalist Communities Council, umbrella group backed by the three main loyalist paramilitary organisations: Ulster Defence Association, the Ulster Volunteer Force and the Red Hand Commando

=== Belfast South ===
For Emma Little Pengelly (DUP):

- Ulster Political Research Group
- Loyalist Communities Council, umbrella group backed by the three main loyalist paramilitary organisations: Ulster Defence Association, the Ulster Volunteer Force and the Red Hand Commando

=== Birmingham Edgbaston ===
For Preet Gill (Labour):

- Sikh Federation

=== Birmingham Erdington ===
For Jack Dromey (Labour):

- More United

=== Birmingham Yardley ===
For Jess Phillips (Labour):

- Iain Dale, political commentator and former Conservative Party politician

=== Bishop Auckland ===
For Helen Goodman (Labour):

- Open Britain

=== Bournemouth West ===
For Conor Burns (Conservative):

- UKIP local party

=== Brecon and Radnorshire ===
For James Gibson-Watt (Liberal Democrat):

- Open Britain

=== Brentford and Isleworth ===
For Ruth Cadbury (Labour):

- Eddie Marsan, actor.
- More United

=== Brighton Kemptown ===
For Lloyd Russell-Moyle (Labour):

- The Green Party local party.

=== Brighton Pavilion ===
For Caroline Lucas (Green):

- Open Britain
- More United
- Liberal Democrat local party
- Vince Cable, former Liberal Democrat MP
- Matt Haig, novelist and journalist
- Best for Britain
- Democracy in Europe Movement 2025

=== Bristol East ===
For Kerry McCarthy (Labour):

- Best for Britain

=== Bristol North West ===
For Darren Jones (Labour):

- Open Britain

=== Bristol West ===
For Molly Scott Cato (Green):

- Hugh Fearnley-Whittingstall, chef and campaigner
- George Monbiot, environmentalist and writer
- Jonathon Porritt, environmentalist and writer
- Chris T-T, singer and songwriter
- National Health Action Party

=== Broxtowe ===
For Anna Soubry (Conservative):

- More United

=== Caithness, Sutherland and Easter Ross ===
For Jamie Stone (Liberal Democrat):

- More United

=== Camberwell and Peckham ===
For Harriet Harman (Labour):

- Janice Turner

=== Cambridge ===
For Julian Huppert (Liberal Democrat):

- Iain Dale, political commentator and former Conservative Party politician

=== Canterbury ===
For Julian Brazier (Conservative):

- UKIP local party

=== Cannock Chase ===
For Paul Dadge (Labour):

- Hugh Grant, English actor and film producer
- Steve Coogan, Actor and comedian

=== Cardiff Central ===
For Jo Stevens (Labour):

- Best for Britain

=== Cardiff South and Penarth ===
For Stephen Doughty (Labour Co-operative):

- More United

=== Cardiff West ===
For Kevin Brennan (Labour):

- Best for Britain
- Dafydd Elis-Thomas, former leader of Plaid Cymru.

=== Carshalton and Wallington ===
For Tom Brake (Liberal Democrat):

- Open Britain
- Best for Britain
- Ranulph Fiennes, English explorer

For Matthew Maxwell-Scott (Conservative Party)

- UKIP local party

=== Ceredigion ===
For Mark Williams (Liberal Democrat):

- More United

=== Chatham and Aylesford ===
For Tracey Crouch (Conservative):

- Iain Dale, political commentator and former Conservative Party politician

=== Cheadle ===
For Mark Hunter (Liberal Democrat):

- More United
- Best for Britain

=== Chingford and Woodford Green ===
For Bilal Mahmood (Labour):

- Open Britain

For Iain Duncan Smith (Conservative):

- UKIP local party

=== Christchurch ===
For Christopher Chope (Conservative):

- UKIP local party

=== Chipping Barnet ===
For Emma Whysall (Labour):

- Open Britain

=== Dulwich and West Norwood ===
For Rachel Wolf (Conservative):

- UKIP local branch

For Rashid Nix (Green):

- Save Central Hill

=== Ealing Central and Acton ===
For Rupa Huq (Labour):

- Best for Britain
- The Green Party local party
- Konnie Huq, television presenter and writer, candidate's sister.
- Shappi Khorsandi, comedian and author.

=== East Dunbartonshire ===
For Jo Swinson (Liberal Democrat):

- More United

=== Eastbourne ===
For Stephen Lloyd (Liberal Democrat):

- Open Britain

=== Edinburgh South ===
For Ian Murray (Labour):

- Open Britain
- More United

=== Edinburgh West ===
For Christine Jardine (Liberal Democrat):

- More United

For Toni Giugliano (Scottish National Party):

- Democracy in Europe Movement 2025

=== Enfield Southgate ===
For Bambos Charalambous (Labour):

- Open Britain

=== Exeter ===
For Ben Bradshaw (Labour):

- Open Britain

=== Feltham and Heston ===
For Seema Malhotra (Labour):

- More United

=== Fermanagh and South Tyrone ===
For Tom Elliott (UUP):

- Leave.EU
- Loyalist Communities Council, umbrella group backed by the three main loyalist paramilitary organisations: Ulster Defence Association, the Ulster Volunteer Force and the Red Hand Commando

=== Glasgow South West ===
For Matt Kerr (Labour and Co-operative):

- Democracy in Europe Movement 2025

=== Gower ===
For Tonia Antoniazzi (Labour):

- The Green Party local party
- Open Britain

=== Guildford ===
For Mark Bray-Perry (Green):

- National Health Action Party

=== Hackney South and Shoreditch ===
For Meg Hillier (Labour):

- Oliver Kamm, journalist and writer

=== Hampstead and Kilburn ===
For Tulip Siddiq (Labour):

- Best for Britain
- More United
- Robert Webb, comedian and actor.

=== Hammersmith ===
For Andy Slaughter (Labour):

- Best for Britain

=== Harborough ===
For Teck Khong (UKIP):

- Leave.EU

=== Harrogate and Knaresborough ===
For Helen Flynn (Liberal Democrat):

- The Green Party local party

=== Hayes and Harlington ===
For John McDonnell (Labour):

- Democracy in Europe Movement 2025

=== Harrow West ===
For Gareth Thomas (Labour Co-operative):

- More United
- Best for Britain

=== Hazel Grove ===
For Lisa Smart (Liberal Democrat):

- Open Britain
- Best for Britain

=== Hendon ===
For Mike Katz (Labour):

- Open Britain

=== High Peak ===
For Andrew Bingham (Conservative):

- UKIP local party

=== Hornsey and Wood Green ===
For Catherine West (Labour):

- Phil Davis, actor, writer and director
- Linda Grant, novelist and journalist

For Nimco Ali (Women's Equality):

- Sue Black, computer scientist, academic and social entrepreneur
- Hibo Wardere, author, anti-female genital mutilation campaigner
- Angela Saini, science journalist, broadcaster and author
- Heydon Prowse activist, journalist, and comedian

=== Hove ===
For Peter Kyle (Labour):

- Open Britain
- More United
- Best for Britain

=== Ilford North ===
For Lee Scott (Conservative):

- UKIP local party

For Wes Streeting (Labour):

- The Green Party local party
- Ian McKellen, actor
- Open Britain

=== Isle of Wight ===
For Vix Lowthion (Green):

- More United
- Best for Britain
- National Health Action Party

=== Kensington ===
For Emma Dent Coad (Labour):

- Open Britain

=== Kettering ===
For Philip Hollobone (Conservative):

- UKIP local party

=== Kingston and Surbiton ===
For Ed Davey (Liberal Democrat):

- Open Britain

=== Kingston upon Hull West and Hessle ===
For Michelle Dewberry (Independent):

- Alan Sugar, business magnate and crossbench peer.

=== Leeds North East ===
For Fabian Hamilton (Labour):

- Best for Britain

=== Leeds West ===
For Rachel Reeves (Labour):

- More United

=== Leicester West ===
For Liz Kendall (Labour):

- Grace Petrie, singer-songwriter
- Open Britain
- More United

=== Lewes ===
For Kelly-Marie Blundell (Liberal Democrat):

- Open Britain
- More United
- Democracy in Europe Movement 2025

=== Leyton and Wanstead ===
For John Cryer (Labour):

- UKIP local party

=== Lincoln ===
For Karl McCartney (Conservative):

- UKIP local party

=== Luton North ===
For Kelvin Hopkins (Labour);

- Leave.EU
- Democracy in Europe Movement 2025

=== Luton South ===
For Gavin Shuker (Labour):

- More United

=== Maidenhead ===
For Gerard Batten (UKIP):

- Leave.EU

=== Manchester Gorton ===
For George Galloway (Independent):

- Leave.EU

For Afzal Khan (Labour):

- Bethany Black, comedian.

=== Mitcham and Morden ===
For Siobhain McDonagh (Labour):

- Steve Brookstein
- Ross Kemp

=== Morley and Outwood ===
For Neil Dawson (Labour):

- The Green Party local party

=== Montgomeryshire ===
For Jane Dodds (Liberal Democrat):

- More United

=== New Forest East ===
For Julian Lewis (Conservative):

- UKIP local party

=== New Forest West ===
For Desmond Swayne (Conservative):

- UKIP local party

=== Newcastle upon Tyne North ===
For Catherine McKinnell (Labour):

- Open Britain

=== Nottingham South ===
For Lilian Greenwood (Labour):

- Open Britain

=== North East Fife ===
For Elizabeth Riches (Liberal Democrat):

- More United

=== North East Somerset ===
For Robin Moss (Labour):

- Los Campesinos!, indie pop band

=== North Norfolk ===
For Norman Lamb (Liberal Democrat):

- Open Britain
- More United
- Frank Bruno, boxer

For James Wild (Conservative):

- UKIP local party

=== North West Leicestershire ===
For Andrew Bridgen (Conservative):

- UKIP local party

=== Norwich North ===
For Chloe Smith (Conservative):

- UKIP local party.

=== Norwich South ===
For Lana Hempsall (Conservative):

- UKIP local party.

For Clive Lewis (Labour):

- More United
- Best for Britain
- Democracy in Europe Movement 2025

=== Orkney and Shetland ===
For Alistair Carmichael (Liberal Democrat):

- More United

=== Oxford East ===
For Larry Sanders (Green):

- National Health Action Party

=== Oxford West and Abingdon ===
For Layla Moran (Liberal Democrat):

- Open Britain
- Green Party local party

=== Paisley and Renfrewshire South ===
For Mhairi Black (Scottish National Party):

- Democracy in Europe Movement 2025

=== Penistone and Stocksbridge ===
For Angela Smith (Labour):

- Open Britain

=== Peterborough ===
For Stewart Jackson (Conservative):

- UKIP local party

=== Plymouth Moor View ===
For Sue Dann (Labour):

- Billy Bragg, singer, songwriter and activist.

=== Plymouth Sutton and Devonport ===
For Luke Pollard (Labour):

- Billy Bragg, singer, songwriter and activist.

=== Pontypridd ===
For Owen Smith (Labour):

- More United
- Open Britain

=== Pudsey ===
For Ian McCargo (Labour):

- The Green Party local party

=== Rhondda ===
For Chris Bryant (Labour):

- More United

=== Richmond Park ===
For Sarah Olney (Liberal Democrat):

- The Green Party local party
- Best for Britain

=== Salford and Eccles ===
For Rebecca Long-Bailey (Labour):

- Democracy in Europe Movement 2025

=== Sedgefield ===
For Phil Wilson (Labour):

- Open Britain

=== Sheffield Central ===
For Natalie Bennett (Green):

- National Health Action Party

=== Sheffield Hallam ===
For Nick Clegg (Liberal Democrat):

- Open Britain
- Best for Britain
- Democracy in Europe Movement 2025

=== Shipley ===
For Philip Davies (Conservative):

- UKIP local party

For Sophie Walker (Women's Equality):

- The Green Party local party
- More United
- Caroline Criado Perez, feminist activist and journalist
- June Sarpong, television presenter
- Democracy in Europe Movement 2025

=== Skipton and Ripon ===
For Andy Brown (Green):

- Liberal Democrat local party

=== Somerton and Frome ===
For David Warburton (Conservative):

- UKIP local party

=== South Leicestershire ===
For Roger Helmer (UKIP):

- Leave.EU

=== South West Surrey ===
For Louise Irvine (National Health Action):

- The Green Party local party
- Brian May, musician and astrophysicist
- Marcus Chown, science writer, journalist and broadcaster
- Democracy in Europe Movement 2025

=== Southampton Test ===
For Alan Whitehead (Labour):

- Open Britain
- The Green Party local party

=== Southport ===
For Sue McGuire (Liberal Democrat):

- More United

=== St Albans ===
For Daisy Cooper (Liberal Democrat):

- More United

=== St Ives ===
For Andrew George (Liberal Democrat):

- Open Britain
- More United

=== Stalybridge and Hyde ===
For Jonathan Reynolds (Labour):

- More United

=== Stockton South ===
For James Wharton (Conservative):

- Steve Gibson, chairman of Middlesbrough football club and former Labour councillor

=== Streatham ===
For Chuka Umunna (Labour):

- More United

=== Surrey Heath ===
For Ann-Marie Barker (Liberal Democrat):

- Emma Kennedy, actress, writer and presenter.

=== Sutton and Cheam ===
For Amna Ahmad (Liberal Democrat):

- Open Britain
- More United

=== Swindon South ===
For Martin Costello (UKIP):

- Leave.EU

=== Thornbury and Yate ===
For Claire Young (Liberal Democrat):

- Open Britain

=== Thurrock ===
For Tim Aker (UKIP):

- Leave.EU

For Jackie Doyle-Price (Conservative):

- Sue Moxley, television presenter and beauty editor
- David Van Day, singer and media personality

=== Tooting ===
For Rosena Allin-Khan (Labour):

- More United

=== Tottenham ===
For David Lammy (Labour):

- David Eldridge, dramatist
- More United

=== Twickenham ===
For Vince Cable (Liberal Democrat):

- The Green Party local party
- More United
- Samantha Bond, actress.

=== Vauxhall ===
For Kate Hoey (Labour)

- UK Independence Party local branch
- Paul Nuttall, former leader of the UK Independence Party
- Tony Adams, former captain of Arsenal football team.
- Piers Corbyn, eurosceptic meteorologist and brother to Labour Leader Jeremy Corbyn.

For George Turner (Liberal Democrat):

- Gia Milinovich, television presenter and writer
- Gina Miller, business owner and campaigner against Brexit
- Oliver Kamm, leader writer and columnist for The Times
- More United
- Open Britain

=== Wakefield ===
For Antony Calvert (Conservative):

- UKIP local party

For Mary Creagh (Labour):

- Open Britain
- Lewis Thompson, UKIP candidate for Normanton, Pontefract and Castleford

=== Wellingborough ===
For Peter Bone (Conservative):

- UKIP local party

=== Wells ===
For James Heappey (Conservative):

- UKIP local party

For Tessa Munt (Liberal Democrat):

- Open Britain
- More United

=== Wigan ===
For Lisa Nandy (Labour):

- Democracy in Europe Movement 2025

=== Wirral South ===
For Alison McGovern (Labour):

- Open Britain
- More United

=== Wolverhampton North East ===
For Emma Reynolds (Labour):

- More United

=== Wolverhampton South East ===
For Pat McFadden (Labour):

- Open Britain

=== Wrexham ===
For Ian Lucas (Labour):

- More United

=== Wycombe ===
For Rafiq Raqa (Labour):

- Open Britain

=== Yeovil ===
For Marcus Fysh (Conservative):

- UKIP local party

For Jo Roundell Greene (Liberal Democrat):

- More United

=== York Central ===
For Rachael Maskell (Labour):

- The Green Party local party

For Ed Young (Conservative):

- UKIP local party

=== York Outer ===
For Julian Sturdy (Conservative)

- UKIP local party
