= Endorsements in the 2024 United Kingdom general election =

  - 2010 general election
  - Endorsements
  - 2015 general election
  - Endorsements
  - 2017 general election
  - Endorsements
  - 2019 general election
  - Endorsements
  - 2024 general election
  - Endorsements

Various newspapers, organisations and individuals endorsed parties or individual candidates for the 2024 United Kingdom general election.

== Endorsements for parties ==
=== Newspapers and magazines ===
==== National daily newspapers ====
Newspaper	Endorsement	Notes	Ref
Daily Express	Conservative Party		
Daily Mail	Conservative Party	Advocated tactical voting for the Conservative Party to ensure it provided an effective opposition to a prospective Labour government.	
Daily Mirror	Labour Party		
Financial Times	Labour Party	Last backed Labour in 2005.	
i	None	Have never endorsed a political party.	
Morning Star	None	Advocated for voting against the Conservatives, but did not endorse any specific party.	
The Daily Telegraph	Conservative Party		
The Guardian	Labour Party	Advocated tactical voting against the government.	
The Independent	Labour Party		
The Sun	Labour Party	Last backed Labour in 2005. Labour Party leader, Keir Starmer responded to the endorsement by saying, "I am delighted to have the support and backing of The Sun" and that it "shows how much this is a changed Labour Party".	
The Times	None	Backed Conservatives in 2019.	

==== National Sunday newspapers ====
Newspaper	Endorsement	Notes	Link
The Observer	Labour Party	Last backed Labour in 2015. Advocated tactical voting for the Liberal Democrats "wherever they are best placed to defeat a Conservative opponent".	
Sunday Express	Conservative Party		
Sunday Mirror	Labour Party		
The Sun on Sunday	None	Backed Conservatives in 2019.	
The Sunday Telegraph	Conservative Party		
Mail on Sunday	Conservative Party		
Sunday People	Labour Party		
The Sunday Times	Labour Party	Last backed Labour in 2001.	

==== National political magazines ====
Publication	Endorsement	Notes	Link
The Economist	Labour Party	Backed Liberal Democrats in 2019	
New Statesman	Labour Party	In addition, "in seats where the Liberal Democrats are the strongest opponent to the Tories, readers should vote tactically."	
Socialist Standard	None	Called on voters to write "world socialism" on their ballot	

==== English regional newspapers ====
Newspaper	Endorsement	Notes	Ref
City A.M.	None	Advocated for voting against the Conservatives, but did not endorse any specific party.	
Evening Standard	Labour Party	Last backed Labour in 2005.	
Express and Star	Labour Party		
Liverpool Echo	Labour Party		
The Yorkshire Post	None	"Set out its own manifesto for Yorkshire"	

==== Northern Irish newspapers ====
Newspaper	Endorsement	Notes	Ref
Irish News	None		

==== Scottish newspapers ====
Newspaper	Endorsement	Notes	Ref
Daily Record	Scottish Labour	Last backed Labour in 2010	
The Scotsman	None		
Sunday Mail	Scottish Labour		
The Scottish Sun	Scottish Labour	Last backed Labour in 2005.	

=== Endorsements from individuals ===
==== Conservative Party ====
- Richard Harpin, CEO of HomeServe
- Frank Hester, CEO of The Phoenix Partnership
- Fraser Nelson, editor of The Spectator
- Peter Wood, CEO of Direct Line Group

==== Green Party ====
- Grace Blakeley, journalist, economist and former member of the Labour Party's National Policy Forum
- Jennie Formby, former General Secretary of the Labour Party (2018 to 2020)
- Lynne Jones, former Labour MP for Birmingham Selly Oak (1992 to 2010)
- George Monbiot, journalist, author and activist
- Gary Stevenson, economist, YouTuber, activist, and former financial trader
- Owen Jones, journalist and activist

==== Labour Party ====
- Lewis Arnold, director
- Syima Aslam, CEO of the Bradford Literature Festival
- Bill Bailey, comedian
- Alison Balsom, trumpet player
- Emily Berrington, actor
- Karen Blackett, businessperson
- Claudie Blakley, actor
- Nick Boles, former Minister of State for Skills (2014 to 2016) and former Conservative—and later independent—MP for Grantham and Stamford (2010 to 2019)
- Hugh Bonneville, actor
- Susan Bullock, opera singer
- Richard Burge, former Director General of the Zoological Society of London
- Matt Cain, writer and broadcaster
- Mark Carney, former governor of the Bank of England (2013 to 2020)
- John Caudwell, founder of Phones 4u
- Lolita Chakrabarti, actress and writer
- Nazrin Choudhury, screenwriter, director and actor
- David Cleevely, founder of Abcam
- Rachel Coldicutt, former CEO of Doteveryone
- Charlie Condou, actor
- Antony Cotton, actor
- Stephen Daldry, director and producer
- Shaun Dooley, actor
- Jeremy Dyson, writer
- Ben Elton, comedian and writer
- Ben Evans, director
- Sophie Evans, singer and actor
- Jane Featherstone, television producer
- Jamie Fobert, architect and designer
- Matt Forde, impressionist, writer and presenter
- Esther Freud, novelist
- Matthew Freud, founder of Freud Communications
- Sonia Friedman, theatre producer
- David Furnish, filmmaker
- Martino Gamper, designer
- Guy Garvey, musician and radio presenter
- Mark Gatiss, actor and writer
- Tom Goodman-Hill, actor
- Jonathan Goodwin, banker and investor
- Trudie Goodwin, actor
- Stephen Graham, actor and producer
- Michael Grandage, director, producer and actor
- Carrie Grant, vocal coach, presenter and singer
- Patrick Grant, clothier and businessperson
- Paul Greengrass, director
- Bonnie Greer, writer
- Edward Hall
- Maggi Hambling, artist
- Kit Harington, actor
- Robin Harper, former co-convener of the Scottish Greens (2004–2008) and former MSP for Lothians (1999 to 2011)
- Pippa Harris, film and television producer
- Jonathan Harvey, writer
- Keeley Hawes, actor
- Benny Higgins, former CEO of Tesco Bank
- Andrew Higginson, chairman of JD Sports
- Douglas Hodge, actor, director and musician
- Nicholas Hynter, director and producer
- Seeta Indrani, dancer and actor
- Elton John, musician
- Jennifer Johnston, opera singer
- Mark Lewis Jones, actor
- Toby Jones, actor
- Cush Jumbo, actor and writer
- Dan Kieran, former CEO of Unbound
- Tom Kerridge, chef
- Beverley Knight, musician
- Låpsley, singer-songwriter
- Paul Lindley, founder of Ella's Kitchen
- Sally Lindsay, actor and presenter
- Piers Linney, businessperson and Dragon's Den media personality
- Jamie Lloyd, theatre director
- Mark Logan, former Conservative MP for Bolton North East (2019 to 2024)
- Matthew Macfadyen, actor
- Jason Manford, comedian
- Perminder Mann, CEO of Bonnier Books UK
- Lesley Manville, actor
- Anna Maxwell Martin, actor
- Kevin McGrath, businessperson
- Deborah Meaden, businessperson and Dragon's Den media personality
- Erdem Moralıoğlu, fashion designer
- Abi Morgan, playwright and screenwriter
- Kate Mosse, writer and broadcaster
- Gary Neville, footballer
- Bill Nighy, actor
- James Norton, actor
- John O'Farrell, writer and campaigner
- Michael O'Leary, CEO of Ryanair
- Ken Owens, former Wales and British and Irish Lions rugby player
- Elsie Owusu, architect
- Andy Palmer, former CEO of Aston Martin
- Theo Paphitis, businessperson and former Dragon's Den media personality
- David Parfitt, film producer and actor
- Nathaniel Parker, actor
- Grayson Perry, artist
- Philippa Perry, psychotherapist and author
- Naomi Pohl, trade union leader
- Dan Poulter, former Parliamentary Under-Secretary of State for Health Services (2012–2015) and former Conservative MP for Central Suffolk and North Ipswich (2010 to 2024) (defected to Labour in April 2024)
- Hugh Quarshie, actor
- Jessica Raine, actor
- Jim Ratcliffe, CEO of Ineos
- Bella Ramsey, actor
- Charles Randell, former chair of the Financial Conduct Authority
- Alice Rawsthorn, design critic and author
- Steffan Rhodri, actor
- Tony Robinson, actor, author and campaigner
- Barrie Rutter, actor and director
- June Sarpong, television presenter and executive
- Feargal Sharkey, singer
- Ed Sheeran, musician
- Chris Skidmore, former Minister of State for Universities, Science, Research and Innovation (2019 to 2020) and former Conservative—and later independent—MP for Kingswood (2010 to 2024)
- Fatboy Slim, musician and record producer
- Rosemary Squire, theatre owner
- Imelda Staunton, actress
- Toby Stephens, actor
- Patrick Stewart, actor
- Jason Stockwood, former CEO of Simply Business and chair of Grimsby Town F.C.
- James Strong, director and writer
- Meera Syal, writer and actor
- Owen Teale, actor
- Bill Thomas, chairman of Spirent
- Edwin Thomas, actor
- Rhys Thomas, writer, producer, director and actor
- Jack Thorne, screenwriter and playwright
- John Tiffany, theatre director
- Jane Tranter, television executive
- Dale Vince, owner of Ecotricity
- Jimmy Wales, co-founder of Wikipedia
- Malcolm Walker, founder of the Iceland supermarket chain
- Richard Walker, chair of the Iceland supermarket chain
- Hannah Walters, actor and producer
- Ian "H" Watkins, singer and actor
- Emily Watson, actor
- Kevin Whately, actor
- Lia Williams, actor and director
- Ruth Wilson, actor
- Helen Worth, actor

==== Reform UK ====
- Derek Chisora, boxer
- Mark Collett, leader of Patriotic Alternative
- Gordon Gibb, businessman and owner of Flamingo Land
- John Hall, property developer and former owner of Newcastle United Football Club
- Tommy Robinson, far-right activist
- James Spencer-Churchill, 12th Duke of Marlborough
- Holly Valance, model, actor and singer
- Toby Young, associate editor of The Spectator
- Charlie Veitch, YouTuber

==== Scottish National Party ====
- Lesley Riddoch, journalist and broadcaster
- Stuart Braithwaite, musician

=== Endorsements from organisations ===
==== Labour Party ====
- Alliance for Workers' Liberty
- Associated Society of Locomotive Engineers and Firemen
- Communication Workers Union
- Community
- Fire Brigades Union
- GMB
- Musicians' Union
- National Union of Mineworkers
- National Union of Rail, Maritime and Transport Workers
- Transport Salaried Staffs' Association
- UNISON
- Union of Shop, Distributive and Allied Workers
- Unite the Union

==== Reform UK ====
- Reclaim Party

== Endorsements in individual constituencies ==
=== East of England ===
==== Basildon and Billericay ====
For Dave Murray (TUSC):

- Transform

==== Bedford ====
For Tarek Javed (independent):

- The Muslim Vote

==== Cambridge ====
For Khalid Abu-Tayyem (Workers Party of Britain):

- The Muslim Vote

==== Clacton ====
For Nigel Farage (Reform UK)

- Douglas Carswell, former Conservative and UKIP MP for Harwich and then Clacton (2005 to 2017)
- Tim Montgomerie, political blogger

==== Lowestoft ====
For Jess Asato (Labour):

- Compass

==== Luton North ====
For Toqueer Shah (independent):

- The Muslim Vote
- Transform

==== Luton South and South Bedfordshire ====
For Attiq Malik (independent):

- The Muslim Vote
- Transform

==== Norwich South ====
For Clive Lewis (Labour):

- Compass
- Momentum

==== South West Norfolk ====
For James Bagge (independent)

- Martin Bell, former Independent MP for Tatton (1997 to 2001)
- David Gauke, former Secretary of State for Justice (2018 to 2019) and Conservative—and later independent—MP for South West Hertfordshire (2005 to 2019)
- Dominic Grieve, former Attorney General for England and Wales (2010 to 2014) and Conservative—and later independent—MP for Beaconsfield (1997 to 2019)
- Rory Stewart, former Secretary of State for International Development (2019) and Conservative—and later independent—MP for Penrith and The Border (2010 to 2019)

==== St Neots and Mid Cambridgeshire ====
For Stephen Ferguson (independent):

- Transform

==== Suffolk Coastal ====
For Julia Ewart (Lib Dem):

- Compass

==== Watford ====
For Khalid Chohan (Workers Party of Britain):

- The Muslim Vote

==== Waveney Valley ====
For Adrian Ramsay (Green Party)

- Compass
- Norman Lamb, former Liberal Democrat MP for North Norfolk (2001 to 2019)
- Steve Coogan, actor and comedian

=== East Midlands ===
==== Boston and Skegness ====
For Richard Tice (Reform UK):

- Tim Montgomerie, political blogger

==== Erewash ====
For Maggie Throup (Conservative):

- Liam Booth-Isherwood, Reform UK candidate for Erewash in 2024 election

==== Derby South ====
For Chris Williamson (Workers Party of Britain):

- The Muslim Vote

==== Grantham and Bourne ====
For Charmaine Morgan (Lincolnshire Independents):

- Transform

==== Leicester East ====
For Claudia Webbe (independent):

- Democracy in Europe Movement 2025
- The Muslim Vote
- Transform
- Workers Party of Britain

==== Leicester South ====
For Shockat Adam (independent):

- The Muslim Vote
- Transform
- Workers Party of Britain
- Azeem Rafiq, cricketer

==== Leicester West ====
For Liz Kendall (Labour):

- Compass

For Steve Score (TUSC):

- Transform

==== Nottingham East ====
For Nadia Whittome (Labour):

- Compass

==== Nottingham South ====
For Paris Ghazni (Workers Party of Britain):

- The Muslim Vote

==== Rushcliffe ====
For James Naish (Labour):

- Compass

==== Scunthorpe ====
For Abdul Butt (independent):

- The Muslim Vote

=== Greater London ===
==== Barking ====
For Muhammad Asim (Workers Party of Britain):

- The Muslim Vote

==== Bethnal Green and Stepney ====
For Rushanara Ali (Labour):

- Compass

For Ajmal Masroor (independent):

- The Muslim Vote
- Workers Party of Britain

==== Bermondsey and Old Southwark ====
For Barry Duckett (independent):

- Transform

==== Brent East ====
For Aadil Sheikh (independent):

- The Muslim Vote

==== Brentford and Isleworth ====
For Nisar Malik (Workers Party of Britain):

- The Muslim Vote

For Zebunisa Rao (independent):

- Transform

==== Chingford and Woodford Green ====
For Faiza Shaheen (independent):

- Democracy in Europe Movement 2025
- Transform
- Ronnie O'Sullivan, professional snooker player
- Workers Party of Britain

==== Cities of London and Westminster ====
For Rachel Blake (Labour):

- Compass

For Rajiv Sinha (Green):

- The Muslim Vote

==== Croydon East ====
For Peter Underwood (Green):

- The Muslim Vote

==== Croydon South ====
For Richard Howard (Lib Dem):

- The Muslim Vote

==== Croydon West ====
For Jahir Hussain (Lib Dem):

- The Muslim Vote

For Donna Murray-Turner (Taking the Initiative Party):

- Transform

==== Dagenham and Rainham ====
For Margaret Mullane (Labour):

- Momentum

==== Ealing North ====
For Sameh Akram Habeeb (Workers Party of Britain):

- The Muslim Vote

==== Ealing Southall ====
For Darshan Singh Azad (Workers Party of Britain):

- The Muslim Vote

==== East Ham ====
For Tahir Mirza (independent):

- Democracy in Europe Movement 2025
- Transform
- Workers Party of Britain

==== Edmonton and Winchmore Hill ====
For Khalid Sadur (independent):

- Transform

==== Enfield North ====
For Ertan Karpazli (independent):

- The Muslim Vote
- Transform

==== Feltham and Heston ====
For Amrit Mann (Workers Party of Britain):

- The Muslim Vote

For Damian Read (independent):

- Transform

==== Finchley and Golders Green ====
For Sarah Hoyle (Lib Dem):

- The Muslim Vote

==== Hackney North and Stoke Newington ====
For Diane Abbott (Labour):

- Democracy in Europe Movement 2025

==== Harrow East ====
For Sabira Lakha (independent):

- The Muslim Vote

==== Harrow West ====
For Pamela Fitzpatrick (independent):

- Democracy in Europe Movement 2025
- The Muslim Vote
- Transform

==== Hayes and Harlington ====
For John McDonnell (Labour):

- Compass
- Momentum

==== Holborn and St Pancras ====
For Andrew Feinstein (independent):

- Eric Clapton, musician
- Democracy in Europe Movement 2025
- Muslim Public Affairs Committee UK
- The Muslim Vote
- Transform
- Workers Party of Britain
- Roger Waters, musician

==== Ilford North ====
For Leanne Mohamad (independent):

- Democracy in Europe Movement 2025
- The Muslim Vote
- Transform

==== Ilford South ====
For Noorjahan Begum (independent):

- The Muslim Vote

==== Islington North ====
For Jeremy Corbyn (independent):

- Rob Delaney, comedian
- Democracy in Europe Movement 2025
- Bobby Gillespie, musician
- Owen Jones, journalist and activist
- Mohammed Kozbar, general secretary of Finsbury Park Mosque
- The Muslim Vote
- National Union of Rail, Maritime and Transport Workers
- Socialist Workers Party
- Stop the War Coalition
- Trade Unionist and Socialist Coalition
- Transform
- Workers Party of Britain

==== Islington South and Finsbury ====
For Carne Ross (Green):

- Owen Jones, journalist and activist
- The Muslim Vote

==== Kensington and Bayswater ====
For Emma Dent Coad (independent):

- Transform

For Joe Powell (Labour):

- Charles Tannock, former Conservative MEP for London (1999 to 2019)
- Compass

==== Lewisham North ====
For John Lloyd (Alliance for Green Socialism):

- Transform

==== Leyton and Wanstead ====
For Shanell Johnson (independent):

- Democracy in Europe Movement 2025
- Muslim Public Affairs Committee UK
- The Muslim Vote
- Transform

==== Poplar and Limehouse ====
For Apsana Begum (Labour):

- Momentum

==== Queen's Park and Maida Vale ====
For Helen Baxter (Lib Dems)

- Stanley Johnson, former Conservative MEP and writer

==== Southgate and Wood Green ====
For Karl Vidol (TUSC):

- The Muslim Vote
- Transform

==== Stratford and Bow ====
For Omar Faruk (independent):

- The Muslim Vote

For Fiona Lali (independent):

- Revolutionary Communist International (party member but ran as independent)
- Transform

==== Streatham and Croydon North ====
For Scott Ainslie (Green):

- The Muslim Vote

==== Tottenham ====
For Nandita Lal (independent):

- The Muslim Vote
- Transform

==== Uxbridge and South Ruislip ====
For Sarah Green (Green):

- The Muslim Vote

For Gary Harbord (TUSC):

- Transform

==== Walthamstow ====
For Imran Arshad (Workers Party of Britain):

- The Muslim Vote

==== West Ham and Beckton ====
For Sophia Naqvi (independent):

- The Muslim Vote
- Transform

=== Northern Ireland ===
==== Belfast East ====
For John Ross (Traditional Unionist Voice):

- Jamie Bryson, Ulster loyalist activist

==== Belfast North ====
For John Finucane (Sinn Féin):

- The Muslim Vote

For David Clarke (Traditional Unionist Voice):

- Jamie Bryson, Ulster loyalist activist

==== Belfast South and Mid Down ====
For Claire Hanna (SDLP):

- Clare Bailey, former leader of Green Party Northern Ireland

==== East Antrim ====
For Sammy Wilson (Democratic Unionist Party):

- Nigel Farage, Reform UK leader

==== East Londonderry ====
For Allister Kyle (Traditional Unionist Voice):

- Jamie Bryson, Ulster loyalist activist

==== Fermanagh and South Tyrone ====
For Diana Armstrong (Ulster Unionist Party):

- Democratic Unionist Party

==== North Antrim ====
For Ian Paisley Jr (Democratic Unionist Party):

- Nigel Farage, Reform UK leader

==== North Down ====
For Alex Easton (independent):

- Jamie Bryson, Ulster loyalist activist
- Democratic Unionist Party
- David Healy, football manager
- Reform UK
- Traditional Unionist Voice

For Stephen Farry (Alliance):

- The Muslim Vote

=== North East England ===
==== Gateshead Central and Whickham ====
For Norman Hall (TUSC):

- Transform

==== Middlesbrough South and East Cleveland ====
For Jemma Joy (Lib Dem):

- The Muslim Vote

For Rod Liddle (SDP):

- Reform UK

==== Newcastle upon Tyne Central and West ====
For Yvonne Ridley (independent):

- The Muslim Vote
- Workers Party of Britain

=== North West England ===
==== Ashton-under-Lyne ====
For Aroma Hassan (Workers Party of Britain):

- The Muslim Vote

==== Birkenhead ====
For Jo Bird (Green):

- Democracy in Europe Movement 2025
- Transform
- Jamie Driscoll, former Labour—then independent—mayor of the North of Tyne

==== Blackley and Middleton South ====
For Dylan Lewis-Creser (Green):

- The Muslim Vote

==== Blackburn ====
For Adnan Hussain (independent):

- The Muslim Vote

For Craig Murray (Workers Party of Britain):

- Stella Assange, lawyer
- Lowkey, rapper and activist
- Roger Waters, musician and co-founder of Pink Floyd

==== Blackpool South ====
For Chris Webb (Labour):

- Momentum

==== Bolton North East ====
For Kevin Allsop (independent):

- Transform

For Rebecca Forrest (Lib Dem):

- The Muslim Vote

==== Burnley ====
For Gordon Birtwistle (Lib Dem):

- The Muslim Vote

==== Bury North ====
For Mark Alcock (Lib Dem):

- The Muslim Vote

==== Carlisle ====
For John Stevenson (Conservative):

- Rory Stewart, former Secretary of State for International Development (2019) and former Conservative, then independent, MP for Penrith and the Border (2010 to 2019)

==== Cheadle ====
For Tom Morrison (Lib Dem):

- Compass

==== Chorley ====
For Martin Powell-Davies (TUSC):

- Transform

==== Crewe and Nantwich ====
For Connor Naismith (Labour):

- Momentum

==== Gorton and Denton ====
For Amanda Gardner (Green):

- The Muslim Vote

==== Hazel Grove ====
For Lisa Smart (Lib Dem):

- Compass

==== Heywood and Middleton North ====
For Chris Furlong (independent):

- Transform

==== Hyndburn ====
For Shabir Faizal (Green):

- The Muslim Vote

==== Lancaster and Wyre ====
For Cat Smith (Labour):

- Compass

==== Liverpool Garston ====
For Sam Gorst (Liverpool Community Independents):

- Democracy in Europe Movement 2025
- Transform
- Workers Party of Britain

==== Liverpool Wavertree ====
For Ann San (independent):

- Democracy in Europe Movement 2025
- Transform
- Workers Party of Britain

==== Macclesfield ====
For Tim Roca (Labour):

- Compass

==== Manchester Central ====
For Ekua Bayunu (Green):

- The Muslim Vote
- Transform

==== Manchester Withington ====
For Richard Kilpatrick (Lib Dem):

- The Muslim Vote

==== Mid Cheshire ====
For Helen Clawson (independent):

- Transform

==== Morecambe and Lunesdale ====
For Lizzi Collinge (Labour):

- Compass

==== Oldham East and Saddleworth ====
For Shanaz Siddique (Workers Party of Britain):

- The Muslim Vote

==== Oldham West, Chadderton and Royton ====
For Zaffar Iqbal (independent):

- The Muslim Vote

==== Preston ====
For Michael Lavalette (independent):

- The Muslim Vote
- Transform

==== Rochdale ====
For George Galloway (Workers Party of Britain):

- The Muslim Vote

==== Southport ====
For Sean Halsall (independent):

- Democracy in Europe Movement 2025
- Transform

==== Stockport ====
For Ayesha Khan (Workers Party of Britain):

- The Muslim Vote

==== Stretford and Urmston ====
For Khalila Chaudry (Workers Party of Britain):

- The Muslim Vote

==== Tatton ====
For Nigel Hennerley (Green):

- The Muslim Vote

==== Westmorland and Lonsdale ====
For Tim Farron (Lib Dem):

- Compass

==== Wigan ====
For Jan Cunliffe (independent):

- Transform

=== Scotland ===
==== Aberdeen North ====
For Lucas Grant (TUSC):

- Transform

==== Aberdeen North ====
For Sophie Molly (independent):

- Transform

==== Alloa and Grangemouth ====
For Brian Leishman (Labour):

- Campaign for Socialism

==== Dundee Central ====
For Jim McFarlane (TUSC):

- Transform

==== Dunfermline and Dollar ====
For Naz Anis-Miah (SNP):

- The Muslim Vote

==== Edinburgh South West ====
For Joanna Cherry (SNP):

- J. K. Rowling, author

==== Glasgow North East ====
For Chris Sermanni (TUSC):

- Transform

==== Glasgow South ====
For Brian Smith (TUSC):

- Transform

==== Glasgow South West ====
For Chris Stephens (SNP):

- The Muslim Vote

==== Na h-Eileanan an Iar ====
For Angus MacNeil (independent, formerly SNP until July 2023):

- Alba Party

=== South East England ===
==== Banbury ====
For Cassi Bellingham (independent):

- Transform

For Sean Woodcock (Labour):

- Compass

==== Brighton Pavilion ====
for Siân Berry (Green):

- Steve Backshall
- Steve Coogan
- Compass
- Women's Equality Party

==== Chesham and Amersham ====
For Sarah Green (Lib Dem):

- Compass

==== Crawley ====
For Robin Burnham (TUSC):

- Transform

==== Didcot and Wantage ====
For Olly Glover (Lib Dem):

- Compass

==== Godalming and Ash ====
For Paul Follows (Lib Dem):

- Compass

==== Henley and Thame ====
For Freddie van Mierlo (Lib Dem):

- Compass

==== Herne Bay and Sandwich ====
For Helen Whitehead (Labour):

- Compass

==== Horsham ====
For John Milne (Lib Dem):

- Compass

==== Hove and Portslade ====
For Tanushka Marah (independent):

- Democracy in Europe Movement 2025
- Transform
- Workers Party of Britain

==== Lewes ====
For James MacCleary (Lib Dem):

- Compass

==== Maidenhead ====
For George Wright (independent):

- Wessex Regionalist Party

==== Oxford East ====
For Jabu Nala-Hartley (independent):

- Democracy in Europe Movement 2025
- Transform

==== Reading Central ====
For Adam Gillman (TUSC):

- Transform

==== Slough ====
For Azhara Chohan (independent):

- The Muslim Vote
- Transform

==== Southampton Itchen ====
For Declan Peter Clune (TUSC):

- Transform

==== Southampton Test ====
For Maggie Fricker (independent):

- Transform

==== Tunbridge Wells ====
For Hassan Kassem (independent):

- Transform

For Mike Martin (Lib Dem):

- Compass

==== Warrington North ====
For Maddison Wheeldon (independent):

- Transform

==== Witney ====
For Charlie Maynard (Lib Dem):

- Compass
- Steve Coogan, actor and comedian

==== Wokingham ====
For Clive Jones (Lib Dem):

- Compass

==== Worthing West ====
For Beccy Cooper (Labour):

- Compass

==== Wycombe ====
For Khalil Ahmed (Workers Party of Britain):

- The Muslim Vote

For Ajaz Rehman (independent):

- Transform

For Emma Reynolds (Labour):

- Compass

=== South West England and Cornwall ===
==== Bristol Central ====
For Thangam Debbonaire (Labour):

- Jonathan Dimbleby, presenter and journalist

For Carla Denyer (Green Party of England and Wales):

- Transform
- Owen Jones, journalist and activist
- Hugh Grant, actor
- Massive Attack, band from Bristol

==== Bristol North East ====
For Dan Smart (TUSC):

- Transform

==== Camborne and Redruth ====
For Perran Moon (Labour):

- Compass

==== Exeter ====
For William Poulter (independent):

- Transform

==== Exmouth and Exeter East ====
For Paul Arnott (Lib Dem):

- Compass

==== Gloucester ====
For Steve Gower (Workers Party of Britain):

- The Muslim Vote

==== Honiton and Sidmouth ====
For Richard Foord (Lib Dem):

- Compass

==== North Cornwall ====
For Phil Hutty (Lib Dem):

- Compass

==== North Devon ====
For Ian Roome (Lib Dem):

- Compass

==== North East Somerset and Hanham ====
For Dan Norris (Labour):

- Compass

==== South Dorset ====
For Giovanna Lewis (independent):

- Transform

==== South East Cornwall ====
For Anna Gelderd (Labour):

- Dawn French, actress, comedian and writer

==== South Cotswolds ====
For Roz Savage (Lib Dem):

- Compass

==== South West Devon ====
For Ben Davy (TUSC):

- Transform

==== South West Wiltshire ====
For Thomas Culshaw (independent):

- Transform

==== St Ives ====
For Andrew George (Lib Dem):

- Compass

==== Stroud ====
For Simon Opher (Labour):

- Compass

==== Swindon North ====
For Scott Hunter (TUSC):

- Transform

==== Tewkesbury ====
For Cameron Thomas (Lib Dem):

- Compass

==== Truro and Falmouth ====
For Jayne Kirkham (Labour):

- Compass

=== Wales ===
==== Cardiff East ====
For John Aaron Williams (TUSC):

- Transform

==== Cardiff North ====
For Irfan Latif (Lib Dem):

- The Muslim Vote

==== Cardiff South and Penarth ====
For Anthony Slaughter (Green Party of England and Wales):

- The Muslim Vote

==== Neath and Swansea East ====
For Carolyn Harris (Labour)

==== Newport East ====
For Pippa Bartolotti (independent):

- The Muslim Vote

==== Swansea West ====
For Gareth Bromhall (TUSC):

- Transform

For Gwyn Williams (Plaid Cymru):

- The Muslim Vote

=== West Midlands ===
==== Aldridge-Brownhills ====
For Ian Garrett (Lib Dem):

- The Muslim Vote

==== Birmingham Edgbaston ====
For Ammar Warraich (independent):

- Democracy in Europe Movement 2025
- The Muslim Vote

==== Birmingham Erdington ====
For Shaukat Ali (independent):

- The Muslim Vote

==== Birmingham Hall Green and Moseley ====
For Mohammad Hafeez (independent):

- Democracy in Europe Movement 2025
- Transform

For Shakeel Afsar (independent):

- Akhmed Yakoob, candidate in Birmingham Ladywood
- Jody McIntyre, candidate in Birmingham Yardley

==== Birmingham Hodge Hill ====
For James Giles (Workers Party of Britain):

- Muslim Public Affairs Committee UK

==== Birmingham Ladywood ====
For Akhmed Yakoob (independent):

- Muslim Public Affairs Committee UK
- The Muslim Vote
- Workers Party of Britain

==== Birmingham Perry Barr ====
For Ayoub Khan (independent):

- The Muslim Vote

==== Birmingham Selly Oak ====
For Kamel Hawwash (independent):

- Democracy in Europe Movement 2025
- The Muslim Vote
- Transform

==== Birmingham Yardley ====
For Jody McIntyre (Workers Party of Britain):

- Muslim Public Affairs Committee UK
- The Muslim Vote

==== Coventry East ====
For Dave Nellist (TUSC):

- Democracy in Europe Movement 2025
- Transform

==== Coventry South ====
For Zarah Sultana (Labour):

- Momentum

==== Dudley ====
For Shakeela Bibi (independent):

- Transform

==== Kingswinford and South Staffordshire ====
For Shaz Saleem (independent):

- The Muslim Vote

==== Monmouthshire ====
For Owen Lewis (independent):

- Transform

==== North Herefordshire ====
For Ellie Chowns (Green Party of England and Wales):

- Kevin McCloud, designer and TV presenter
- Hugh Fearnley-Whittingstall, TV presenter and author

==== Smethwick ====
For Nahim Rabani (Workers Party of Britain):

- The Muslim Vote

==== Stoke-on-Trent Central ====
For Navid Kaleem (independent):

- The Muslim Vote

==== Sutton Coldfield ====
For Andrew Mitchell (Conservative Party)

- Bob Geldof, singer-songwriter

==== Telford ====
For Alan Adams (Reform UK):

- Lucy Allan, former Conservative MP for Telford (2015 to 2024)

==== The Wrekin ====
For Roh Yakobi (Labour):

- Mary Beard, classicist

==== Walsall and Bloxwich ====
For Aftab Nawaz (independent):

- The Muslim Vote
- Transform

==== West Bromwich ====
For Parmjit Singh Gill (Lib Dem):

- The Muslim Vote

==== Wolverhampton West ====
For Zahid Shah (independent):

- The Muslim Vote

==== Worcester ====
For Mark Davies (TUSC):

- Transform

=== Yorkshire and the Humber ===
==== Dewsbury and Batley ====
For Iqbal Mohamed (independent):

- Transform

==== Doncaster North ====
For Andy Hiles (TUSC):

- Transform

==== Great Grimsby and Cleethorpes ====
For Mark Gee (TUSC):

- Transform

==== Harrogate and Knaresborough ====
For Tom Gordon (Lib Dem):

- Compass

==== Huddersfield ====
For Andrew Cooper (Green):

- The Muslim Vote

==== Keighley and Ilkley ====
For John Grogan (Labour):

- Compass

For Vaz Shabir (Workers Party of Britain):

- The Muslim Vote

==== Leeds Central and Headingley ====
For Louie George Fulton (TUSC):

- Transform

For Owais Rajput (Workers Party of Britain):

- The Muslim Vote

==== Leeds North East ====
For Mike Davies (Alliance for Green Socialism):

- Transform

For Dawud Islam (Workers Party of Britain):

- The Muslim Vote

==== Leeds South ====
For Ed Carlisle (Green):

- The Muslim Vote

==== Leeds South West and Morley ====
For Andrea Jenkyns (Conservative):

- Henry Bolton, former UK Independence Party leader

==== Scarborough and Whitby ====
For Asa Jones (SJP):

- Transform

==== Sheffield Brightside and Hillsborough ====
For Maxine Browler (independent):

- Transform

For Christine Gilligan Kubo (Green):

- The Muslim Vote

==== Sheffield Central ====
For Isabelle France (TUSC):

- Transform

==== Sheffield Hallam ====
For Olivia Blake (Labour):

- Momentum

==== Sheffield Heeley ====
For Mick Suter (TUSC):

- Transform

==== Wetherby and Easingwold ====
For Arnold Warneken (Green):

- Compass

==== York Outer ====
For Luke Charters (Labour):

- Compass
