= The Greek Gods =

American yogurt company

- Type: Subsidiary
- Industry: Food
- Founded: 2003
- Headquarters: Seattle, Washington
- Products: Yogurt
- Parent: Hain Celestial Group
- Website: www.greekgodsyogurt.com

The Greek Gods is an American yogurt company based in Seattle, Washington. Their products include Greek-style yogurt, kefir and lebni. The company was founded in 2003 and acquired by the Hain Celestial Group in 2010.
