= Hain Celestial =

Natural foods company

The Hain Celestial Group, Inc.
- Type: Public
- Traded as: Nasdaq: HAIN
- Industry: Food and beverage; personal care products
- Founded: 1993; 33 years ago
- Headquarters: Hoboken, New Jersey, U.S.
- Number of locations: Products sold in 75 countries worldwide
- Area served: North America; Europe; India
- Key people: Wendy Davidson (CEO); Lee Boyce (CFO)
- Revenue: ▼US$1.56 billion (2025)
- Net income: ▼ −US$531 million (2025)
- Total assets: US$2.26 billion (2023)
- Number of employees: 3,087 (June 30, 2021)
- Subsidiaries: Hain Daniels
- Website: hain.com

The Hain Celestial Group, Inc. is an international food and personal-care company based in the United States. Its products include natural foods and organic personal-care items. Founded in 1993 as Hain Food Group, it changed its name to Hain Celestial Group after merging with Celestial Seasonings in 2000. It is publicly traded on the NASDAQ with brands that include Ella's Kitchen, Frank Cooper's, and Linda McCartney Foods.

== History ==
Hain Celestial Group was founded by Irwin D. Simon in 1993. It was originally called Hain Food Group when founded, making acquisitions of other companies that included Barricini Foods and Kineret. It went public on the NASDAQ in 1993.

The H. J. Heinz Company acquired 19.5% of the company in September 1999, subsequently divesting its holdings in the company in 2005. Hain purchased Celestial Seasonings in 2000 for a deal valued at approximately $390 million. It subsequently changed its name to Hain Celestial Group. In 2002, it restated prior years promotional allowances and other sales incentives of $16.8 million.

By 2012, Hain was the world's largest natural food company with $1.4 billion in revenue. By 2013, it owned approximately 50 brands and offered 5,000 products internationally.

In 2015, the company acquired the non-dairy company Mona Naturprodukte GmbH with its brand Joya.

== Operations ==
In June 2018, Hain Celestial announced that CEO Irwin Simon would step down. He was replaced by Mark Schiller who became the company's president and CEO until January 2023 when he was replaced by Wendy Davidson. The company moved its headquarters to Hoboken, New Jersey in 2023.

== Products ==
Hain Celestial Group sells natural and organic foods as well as personal-care brands through retailers such as Whole Foods, Costco, Wal-Mart, and other mass-market grocery stores. Its food brands have included Celestial Seasonings, Terra vegetable chips, Earth's Best, Garden Veggie Snacks, ParmCrisps, and Thinster snacks.

== Litigation ==
In 2011, Hain Celestial Group was one of 25 companies named in a class-action lawsuit alleging false labeling of its personal care products under California law. The company settled the lawsuit in 2015, paying $7.5 million in compensation with an additional $2.4 million worth of coupons to consumers.

In February 2021, Hain Celestial Group was named in a series of consumer class-action lawsuits alleging that its Earth's Best baby food products contained unsafe or undisclosed levels of naturally occurring heavy metals, including lead, arsenic, cadmium, and mercury. The cases were subsequently transferred and consolidated in the U.S. District Court for the Eastern District of New York. Plaintiffs alleged violations of state consumer-protection laws and other claims related to the alleged failure to disclose the presence of heavy metals in the baby food. In 2026, the court excluded the plaintiffs' general-causation experts in February, and Hain filed a motion for summary judgment in May.

=== List of brands ===
- Alba Botanica
- Avalon Organics
- Celestial Seasonings
- Clarks (a sweetener brand)
- Cully & Sully
- Earth's Best
- Ella's Kitchen
- Frank Cooper's
- Garden of Eatin'
- Hartley's
- Imagine Foods
- JĀSÖN Natural Products
- Joya (European plant-based company)
- Lima
- Linda McCartney Foods
- Live Clean
- MaraNatha
- Natumi
- New Covent Garden Soup Co.
- Robertson's
- Rose's
- Garden Veggie Snacks
- Spectrum
- Sun-Pat Peanut Butter
- Terra Chips
- The Greek Gods
- Thinsters
- Walnut Acres
- Yorkshire Provender
- Yves Veggie Cuisine

== See also ==
- List of food companies
