= Linda McCartney Foods =

British food brand

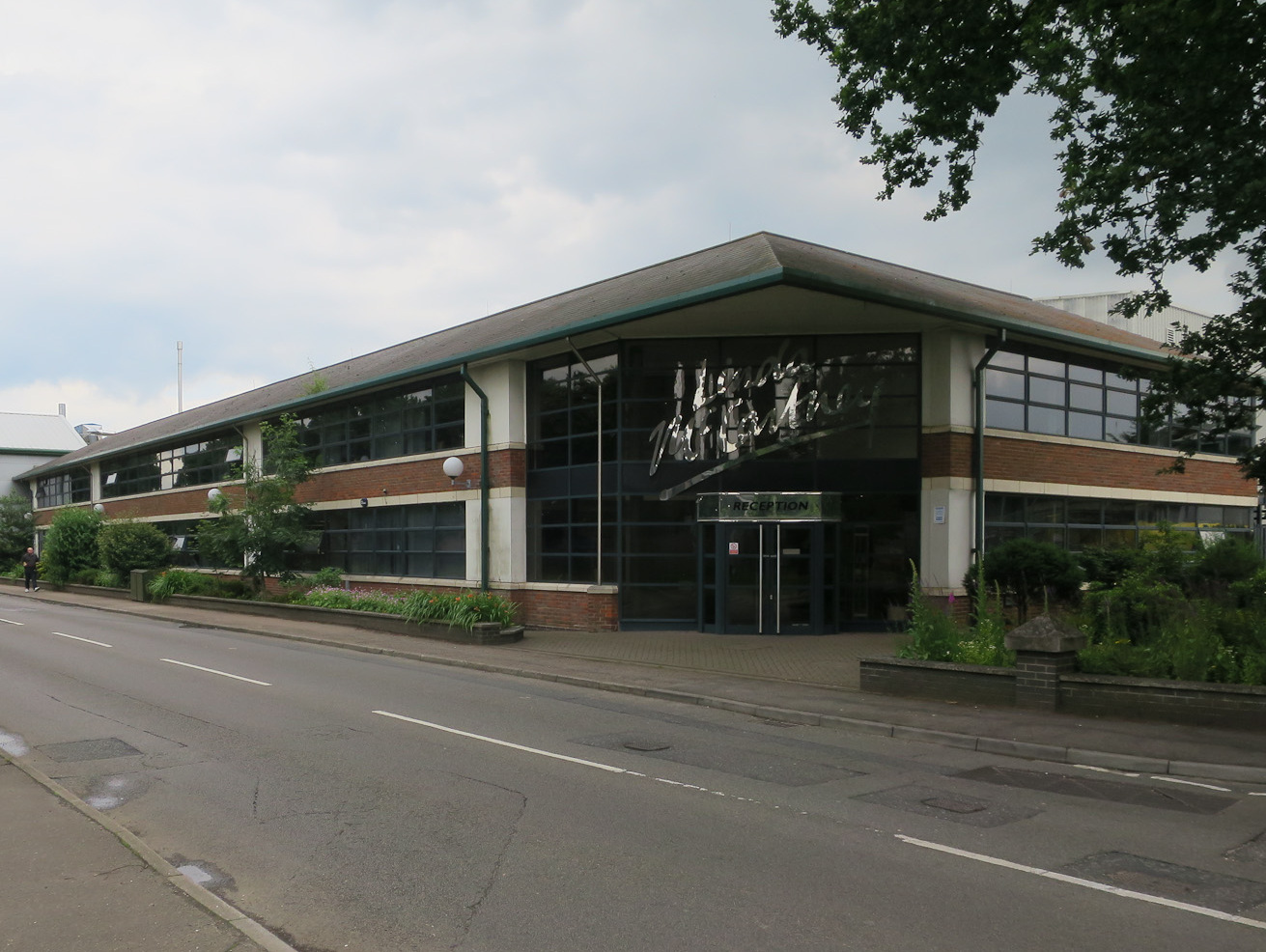
- Linda McCartney Foods in Holt Road, Fakenham
- Industry: Vegetarian cuisine
- Founded: 1991; 35 years ago
- Founder: Linda McCartney
- Parent: Hain Celestial Group
- Website: lindamccartneyfoods.co.uk

Linda McCartney Foods is a British food brand specialising in vegetarian and vegan food. Available in the UK, as well as Norway, Ireland, Austria, Australia, South Africa and New Zealand, the range includes chilled and frozen meat analogues in the form of burgers, sausages, sausage rolls, meatballs, stir-fry dishes and pastas.

The brand was created in 1991 by musician, photographer and activist Linda McCartney, and has been described as one of the most successful mass-market celebrity brands. It has changed ownership several times, with its past owners including McVitie's and Heinz. Since 2006, it has been owned by Hain Celestial Group.

== History ==
=== Early history ===
Linda McCartney Foods was founded by Linda McCartney in 1991. It launched with a range of frozen vegetarian products including golden nuggets, ploughman's pie, ploughman's pasties, lasagna, Italian-style toppers and beefless burgers, with recipes based on dehydrated textured vegetable protein (TVP). The brand was preceded by McCartney's cookbook, Linda McCartney's Home Cooking, which was used by the tour chef for the McCartney's band for the 1989 exclusively-vegetarian catered tour "rock's first veggie tour."

The original packaging graphics featured Linda McCartney's portrait and signature, a black and white illustration by artist Jonathan Mercer, and the Vegetarian Society's seal of approval. The ready meals were manufactured by frozen food company Ross Young's, and were the first to not feature either the Ross or the Young's name.

Further products were added in 1991 and 1992, including Spaghetti Bolognese-style, Deep country pies, cauliflower and broccoli potato gratin and vegetable wedges. The Spaghetti Bolognese style was marketed as being the "...only meat analog version of the product" available on the market. The brand was introduced across Europe in 1992. and America.

The products changed ingredients in 1993, switching from TVP to wheat protein. This was marketed as providing a more meat-like taste than other meat analogue brands. In 1995, it was noted that the sausages were manufactured from TVP seasoned with parsley. The product range was expanded in 1995, coinciding with the brand's television commercial and the opening of a dedicated factory in Fakenham. The new and updated products included beefless burgers, country-style Kievs, savoury burgers, crunchy garlic grills and vegetable cheese burgers.

In December 1993, McCartney announced a range of vegetarian frozen entrees to be released in America under the brand name Linda McCartney's Foods from the Heart. The range was made under and agreement with Fairmont Foods of Minnesota (FFM). The range was launched in March 1994 as Linda McCartney's Home Style Cooking, and was the first American company with a completely meatless range of food products. Products included boil-in Fetticini Alfredo, Pasta Provencale, Pasta Primavera, Rigatone Marinara, Bavarian Goulash, Spaghetti Milano and Chili Non-Carne; and preplated dishes: Lasagna Roma and Burrito Grande.

=== 1996-present; McVitie's, Heinz, and Hain Celestial Group ===
The brand became part of United Biscuits' McVitie's Prepared Foods division in March 1996. In October 1996 as part of United Biscuits' McVitie's Prepared Foods, the range was improved to reduce fat and sodium and increase protein levels. At relaunch, a total of 14 products were offered, which included pepperoni-style main meal pizza, and modified existing offerings included: creamy garlic kievs, cannelloni, Linda's original stew and dumplings, chilli non carne with mozzarella potato wedges, and farmhouse-style pies.

The company was sold in December 1999 to H.J. Heinz Co., who planned to sell the vegetarian food products worldwide. It was acquired as part of purchasing United Biscuits' frozen and chilled foods division.

It was sold again in 2006 to the Hain Celestial Group. The McCartney family remains involved in its development.

== Products ==
Linda McCartney Foods products include chilled and frozen meat analogues in the form of burgers, sausages, sausage rolls, meatballs, stir-fry dishes and pastas. In 1995, in addition to Pasta Primavera, Fettucini Alfredo, Lasagne Roma, Burrito Grande, other products were American Barbecue, Tex-Mex Tostada and Traditional Stew.

The food range faced recalls in the 1990's, including pies containing too much meat in 1992 and beefless burgers containing more fat than advertised in 1995. A 1999 report from BBC Two alleged products contained genetically modified soya.

== Sponsorships ==
Linda McCartney Foods sponsored the Linda McCartney cycle team set up by Julian Clarke in 1998. In 2000, it became the first British team to compete in the Giro d'Italia with rider David McKenzie winning one of the stages. The team disbanded the same year with debts owed to some of the team members.

== See also ==
- List of meat substitutes
- List of vegetarian and vegan companies
