= St Dominic's Grammar School =

Coordinates: 52.67726°N 2.175824°W

Location
- Bargate Street; Brewood, Staffordshire, ST19 9BA; England

Information
- Type: Private day school
- Motto: Veritas ("Truth")
- Religious affiliation: Christian
- Established: 1920
- Department for Education URN: 124471 Tables
- Headmaster: P McNabb
- Gender: Mixed
- Age: 3 to 18
- Enrolment: 280
- Former pupils: Dominicans
- Website: https://www.stdominicsgrammarschool.co.uk

St Dominic's Grammar School (formerly St Dominic's Brewood and St Dominic's High School For Girls) is a private day school for girls and boys aged 2 to 18 in the village of Brewood, Staffordshire, England. The school is centred on a large Victorian brick building in rural Staffordshire, just north of Wolverhampton. Founded in 1920 by the Dominican Order resident in Staffordshire, it is now an inter-denominational school but retains its Christian ethos and the historic logo featuring the cross from the order's seal.

== History ==
St Dominic's was founded by the Dominican Sisters in 1920 as a small convent school for girls to train them in the "domestic arts". Dominican Convent School opened with half a dozen girls but grew steadily over the years. In 1974 it became St Dominic's Brewood Trust and an inter-denominational Christian school. A sixth form was opened in 2007. In September 2010 it changed its name from St Dominic's School to St Dominic's High School for Girls and later changed to St Dominic's Brewood and then became a co-educational school from September 2017. The first male headmaster was appointed in 2012.

=== Bargate House ===
The building it was founded in is Bargate House, now occupied by the senior school. Bargate was a workhouse for the Penkridge Union during the Industrial Revolution and was sold to Wolverhampton wine merchant Louis Connolly in 1919. Connolly, who was a Catholic, sold it to Fr O'Toole, a local priest. Fr O'Toole then offered it to the Sisters to use it as a school or an invalid home. Bargate was designated a Grade II listed building in 1985.

== Notable alumnae ==
- Philippa Marshall (1920-2005) – Director of the Women's Royal Air Force 1969–1973
- Rebecca Atkinson-Lord - Artistic director at Ovalhouse in London.
- Anthea Turner (b. 1960) - television presenter
- Jacqui Oatley (b. 1975) - sports broadcaster
- Anya Chalotra (b. 1994) - actress
