= Sun-Pat =

British peanut butter brand

- Product type: Food
- Current owner: Hain Celestial Group
- Country: United Kingdom
- Previous owners: Rowntree's; Premier Foods
- Website: www.sunpat.co.uk

Sun-Pat is a UK brand of peanut butter founded in 1946 by H S Whiteside, a family run firm, from their factory in Parkhouse Street, Camberwell, London. Sun-Pat is now owned by American company Hain Celestial Group.

== History ==
Sun-Pat opened a factory in Peckham, south London which was bombed on October 15, 1940 during the blitz. Several women were killed and many injured.

In 1958, H S Whiteside acquired Maconochie Brothers, and production was moved up to their factory in Hadfield, near Manchester. In 1965, Whitesides overstretched themselves financially, and the company was bought by Rowntrees in 1967. Rowntrees, in turn, was taken over by Nestlé in June 1988.

In the beginning of the 1990s, a range of cheese spreads were also produced under the Sun-Pat brand, but were later discontinued.

In May 2002, after its acquisition of Nestlé's ambient food business, Premier Foods acquired Sun-Pat. The factory in Hadfield was closed down in 2004, and production then moved to Histon, Cambridgeshire. In October 2012, after its acquisition of Premier Foods' spreads and jellies business, Sun-Pat is currently owned by Hain Celestial Group.
