= Terra Chips =

Brand of root vegetable chips

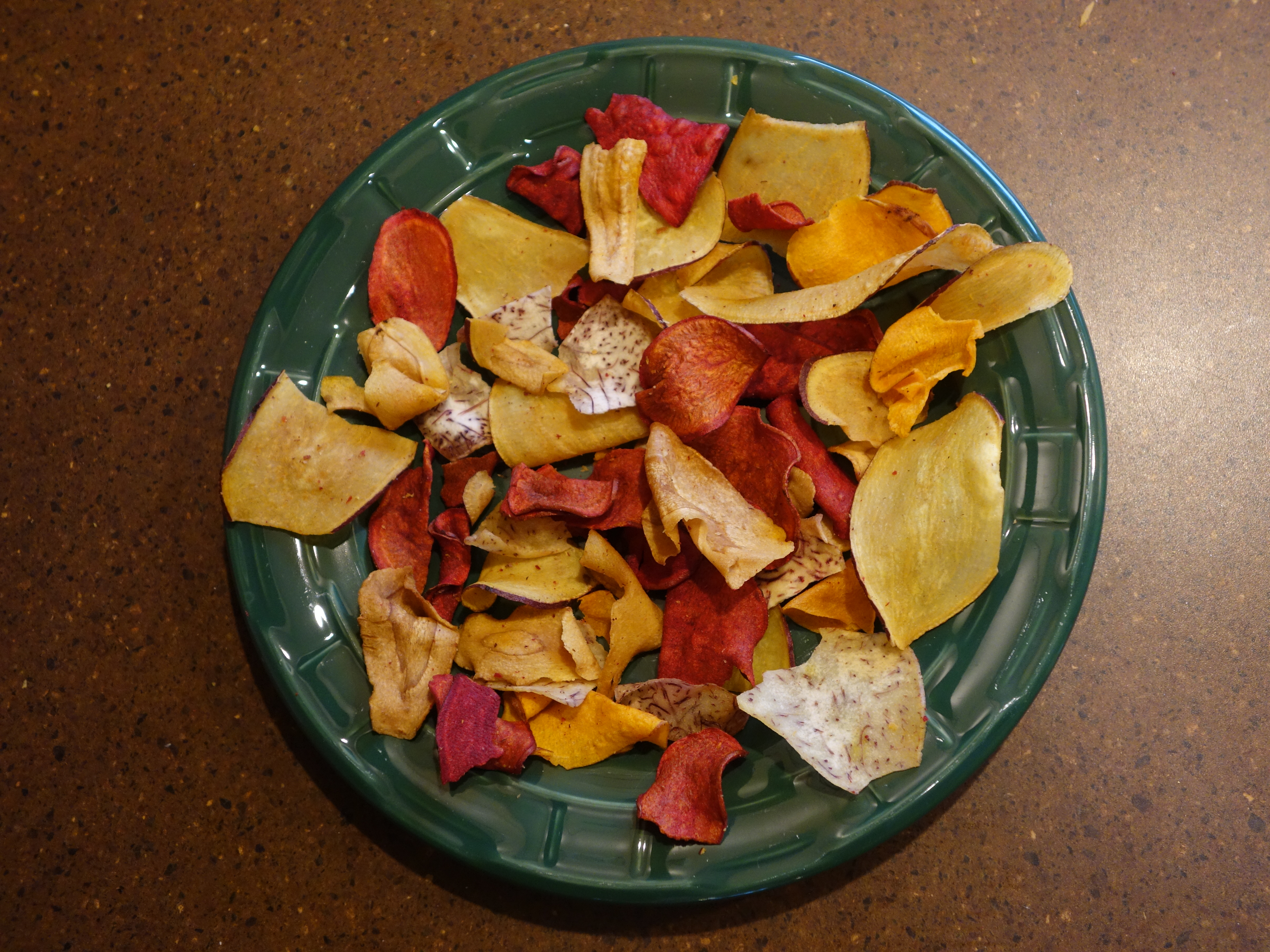
- Bowl of Terra Chips shown in 2013.
- Product type: Root vegetable chips
- Current owner: Hain Celestial Group
- Introduced: 1990
- Website: Official website

Terra Chips is an American brand of root vegetable chips. Launched in 1990, the brand is owned by Hain Celestial Group.

== History ==
Terra Chips were created by chefs Dana Sinkler and Alex Dzieduszycki who quit their jobs at a four-star restaurant to start a catering business. During the process, they launched Terra Chips as an appetizer for the catering business. The product consisted of multi-colored chips made from root vegetables and made the business $1 million in the first year of sales. In 1990, the company received a large order from Saks and gave up catering to focus on the brand full-time. The brand was purchased by Hain Celestial Group in 2001.

== Products ==
Terra Chips are produced in various flavors and made with parsnips, sweet potatoes, and other vegetables.
