= Earth's Best =

Organic baby food brand

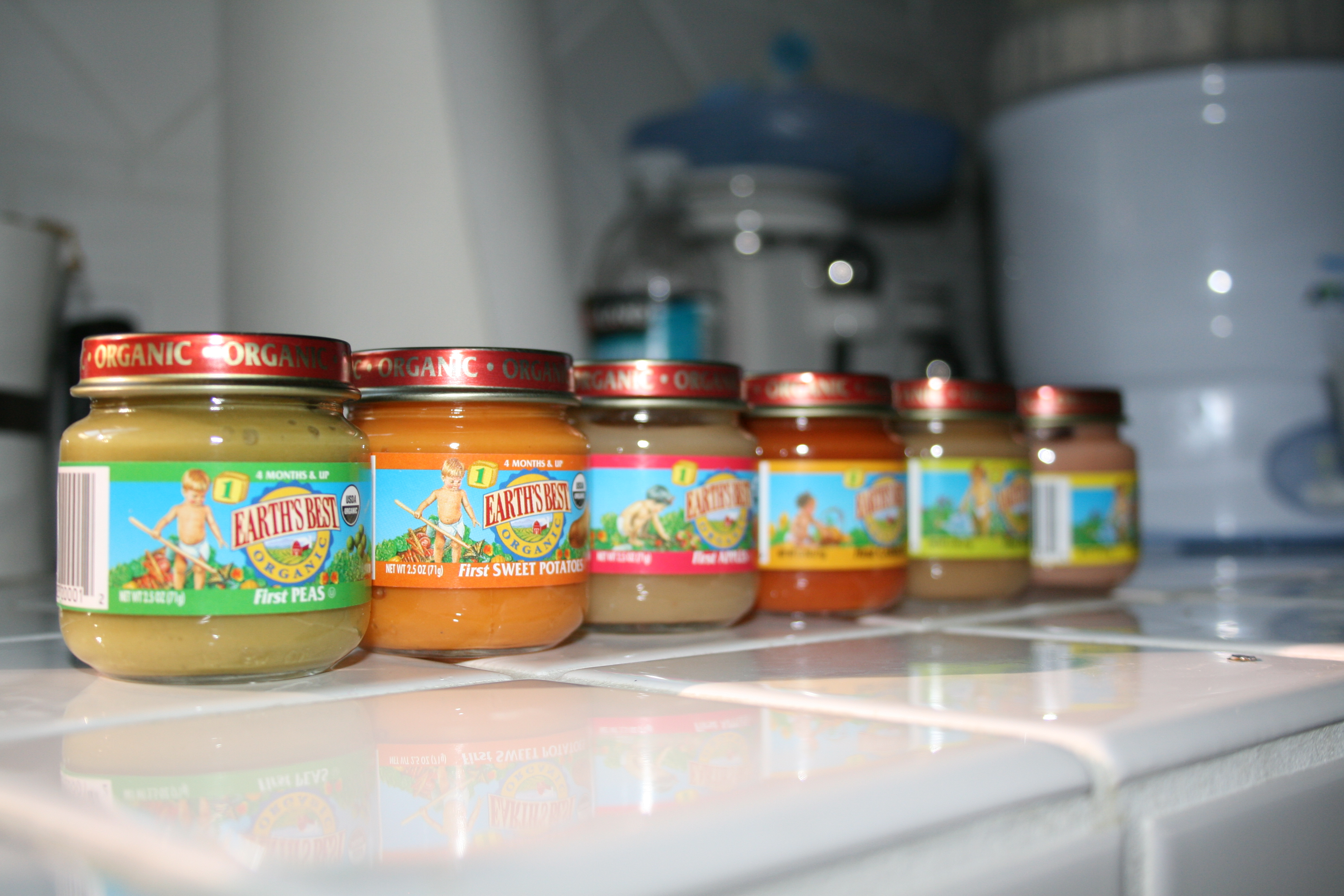
- Product type: Organic baby food
- Current owner: Hain Celestial Group
- Introduced: 1987
- Website: Official website

Earth's Best is a brand of organic baby food made from organically grown fruits and vegetables.

== History ==
Earth's Best was founded by twins Ron and Arnie Koss. The idea for the brand was developed in the mid-1970's while they were working at a natural food store in New York, seeing few natural food items for babies. They began to develop the brand in 1984 and officially launched in 1987 after receiving funding to manufacture the product. By 1990, it was the fourth ranked baby food based on sales. The brand was purchased by Heinz in 1991.

Earth's Best was purchased by Hain Celstial Group in 1999. As of 2022, it held 29 percent market share of the baby food industry in the United States.

== Products ==
Earth's Best is made from food that is organically grown and was the first organic baby food brand. In addition to baby food, it also manufactures organic baby formula.
