= Endorsements in the 2010 United Kingdom general election =

  - 2010 general election
  - Endorsements
  - 2015 general election
  - Endorsements
  - 2017 general election
  - Endorsements
  - 2019 general election
  - Endorsements
  - 2024 general election
  - Endorsements

During the 2010 general election, a number of newspapers made endorsements of a political party. This is an incomplete list.

A number of newspapers changed their endorsements from the previous general election, in 2005. The most notable changes were those of The Sun, The Times, The Sunday Times and the News of the World (all owned by News International), to the Conservative Party, having all backed Labour since 1997.

The Financial Times, the Evening Standard, The Economist also switched their endorsement from Labour to the Conservatives. The Liberal Democrats picked up the endorsement of The Guardian and The Observer.

== National newspapers ==
=== British daily newspapers ===
Newspaper	Party endorsed	Notes
Daily Express	Conservative Party	
Daily Mail	Conservative Party	
Daily Mirror	Labour Party	
Daily Star	None	
Daily Telegraph	Conservative Party	
Financial Times	Conservative Party	Backed Labour in 2005.
Guardian	Liberal Democrats	Backed Labour in 2005. Backed Labour in 2015. Supports anti-Conservative tactical voting with view to pro-electoral reform coalition.
Independent	Liberal Democrats	Supports proportional representation. Urged anti-Conservative tactical voting.
Morning Star	None	Calls for a Labour vote where Communist or similar left-wing candidates are not standing.
Sun	Conservative Party	Backed Labour in 2005.
Times	Conservative Party	Backed Labour in 2005.

=== British Sunday newspapers ===
Newspaper	Party endorsed	Notes
Independent on Sunday	None	Supports a hung parliament.
Mail on Sunday	Conservative Party	
News of the World	Conservative Party	Backed Labour in 2005.
Observer	Liberal Democrats	Backed Labour in 2005.
Sunday Mirror	Labour Party	
People	None	Supports a hung parliament.
Sunday Express	Conservative Party	
Sunday Telegraph	Conservative Party	
Sunday Times	Conservative Party	Backed Labour in 2005.

=== British news magazines ===
Newspaper	Party endorsed	Notes
The Economist	Conservative Party	Backed Labour in 2005.
New Statesman	None	Anti-Conservative tactical voting
The Spectator	Conservative Party	

== Regional newspapers ==
=== England ===
Newspaper	Party endorsed	Notes
City A.M.	Conservative Party	
Evening Standard	Conservative Party	Backed Labour in 2005
Liverpool Echo	Labour Party	
Manchester Evening News	Labour Party	
Metro	None	
Yorkshire Post	Conservative Party	

=== Northern Ireland ===
Newspaper	Party endorsed	Notes
Belfast Telegraph	DUP/UUP	
Irish News	Sinn Fein	
News Letter	Unionists	Pro-Unionist Parties. Back Unity candidate Rodney Connor.

=== Scotland ===
Newspaper	Party endorsed	Notes
Daily Record	Labour Party	
The Herald	None	Backed "No" in independence referendum
The Scotsman	None	
The Scottish Sun	Scottish National Party	
Greenock Telegraph	Green Party	
Kilmarnock Standard	Labour Party	
Evening Telegraph		
Paisley Daily Express	Labour Party	
The National	Scottish National Party	
The Press and Journal	Conservative Party	
The Courier	Conservative Party	

== See also ==
- List of newspapers in the United Kingdom
- Endorsements in the 2015 United Kingdom general election
