= Cully & Sully =

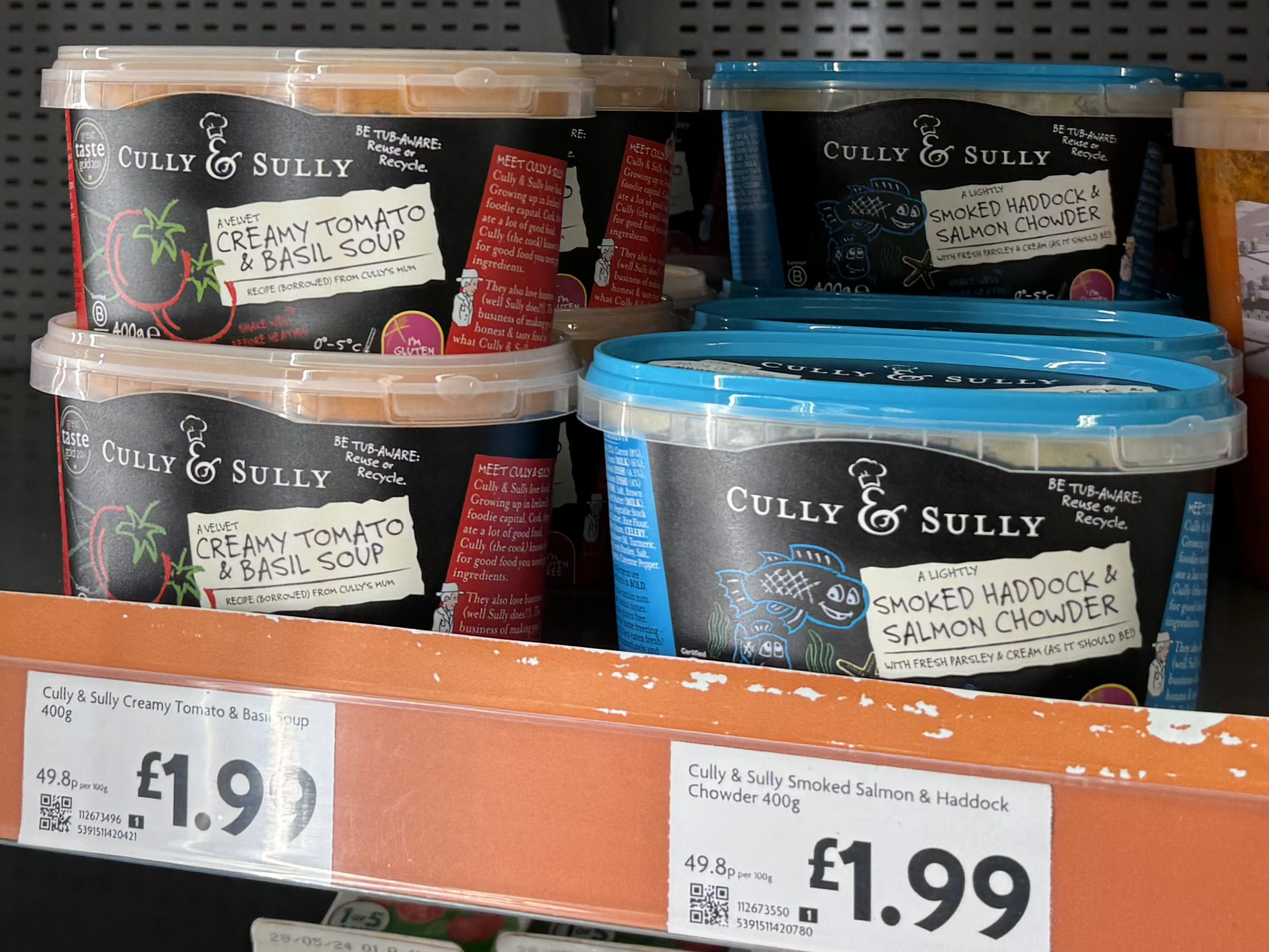
- Current owner: Hain Celestial Group
- Introduced: 2004
- Previous owners: Cullen Allen; Colum O'Sullivan
- Website: Official website

Cully & Sully is a brand of ready-to-eat soups, pies, and risottos.

== History ==
Cully & Sully was founded by Cullen Allen and Colum O'Sullivan. The company began with a line of pies which it launched in 2004 and then five different soups which it launched in 2006. In 2012, Cully & Sully was purchased by Hain Celestial Group with both Allen and O'Sullivan staying on to run the brand. It also moved some of its manufacturing to the UK after the purchase.

The company expanded into the United Kingdom in 2017, releasing six of its soups in Britain through Tesco and in 2020 it received B Corporation status, one of only three companies in Ireland to do so.
