= Endorsements in the 2015 United Kingdom general election =

  - 2010 general election
  - Endorsements
  - 2015 general election
  - Endorsements
  - 2017 general election
  - Endorsements
  - 2019 general election
  - Endorsements
  - 2024 general election
  - Endorsements

Various newspapers, organisations and individuals endorsed parties or individual candidates for the 2015 general election

== Endorsements for parties ==
=== Newspapers and magazines ===
==== National daily newspapers ====
Newspaper	Main endorsement	Secondary endorsement(s)	Notes	Link
Daily Express	UKIP	Conservative	Endorsed the UK Independence Party.	
Daily Mail	Conservative Party	UKIP	Supported a Conservative government. Encouraged anti-Labour tactical voting.	
Daily Mail	Conservative Party	Liberal Democrats	Supported a Conservative government. Encouraged anti-Labour tactical voting.	
Daily Mirror (& other Reach plc owned papers)	Labour	Liberal Democrats	Endorsed a Labour government. Supported tactically voting LibDem against the Conservatives in marginal seats.	
Daily Telegraph	Conservative	None		
Financial Times	Conservative	Liberal Democrats	Endorsed a Conservative-led coalition.	
The Guardian	Labour Party	Green	Endorsed the Labour Party. Also supported Green and Liberal Democrat candidates where they were the main opposition to the Conservatives.	
The Guardian	Labour Party	Liberal Democrats	Endorsed the Labour Party. Also supported Green and Liberal Democrat candidates where they were the main opposition to the Conservatives.	
The Independent	Liberal Democrats	Conservative	Endorsed a second term of the Conservative-Liberal Democrat coalition.	
Metro	None			
Morning Star	Labour	Communist	Endorsed the Labour Party in opposition to the Conservative Party.	
News Line	Workers Revolutionary	Labour	Endorsed a vote for the seven Workers Revolutionary Party candidates, Labour elsewhere.	
The Sun	Conservative	Liberal Democrats	Supported voting for the Liberal Democrats in 14 Labour/LibDem marginals.	
The Times	Conservative	Liberal Democrats	Endorsed a second term of Conservative-Liberal Democrat coalition.	

==== National weekly newspapers ====
Newspaper	Main endorsement	Secondary endorsement(s)	Notes	Link
New Worker	Labour	None		
Weekly Worker	Labour	Minor left-wing and far-left parties.	Endorsed 39 left-wing Labour candidates. The paper also supported Left Unity, Trade Unionist and Socialist Coalition, Communist Party of Britain, Respect Party, Socialist Labour Party, Socialist Party of Great Britain, Workers Revolutionary Party, Class War Party, Socialist Equality Party, Republican Socialists and Communist League.	

==== National monthly newspapers ====
Newspaper	Main endorsement	Secondary endorsement(s)	Notes	Link
Peace News	Green	Labour	Endorsed Greens and left-wing Labour candidates. Supported candidates who commit to the '2050 decarbonisation goal and/or to not replacing Trident'.	

==== National Sunday newspapers ====
Newspaper	Party endorsed	Notes	Link
Independent on Sunday	None	Newspaper stated in an editorial that it was not advising readers how to vote in 2015.	
Mail on Sunday	Conservative		
The Observer	Labour		
Sunday Express	UKIP		
Sunday Mirror	Labour		
Sunday People	Labour		
Sunday Telegraph	Conservative		
Sunday Times	Conservative		

==== News magazines ====
Magazine	Party endorsed	Notes	Link
Economist	Conservative	Endorsed a Conservative-led coalition.	

==== Political magazines ====
Magazine	Party endorsed	Notes	Link
New Statesman	Labour		
Spectator	Conservative		

==== English newspapers ====
Newspaper	Party endorsed	Notes	Link
City A.M.	Conservative		
Express & Star	Conservative		
Liverpool Echo	Labour		
London Evening Standard	Conservative	Endorsed the Conservative Party, and selective tactical voting for the Liberal Democrats.	
Manchester Evening News	None		
Southern Daily Echo	Conservative	Urged voters to support the Conservative Party with the exception of those where Liberal Democrats were in lead.	
The Yorkshire Post	Conservative	Endorsed a continuation of the Conservative-Lib Dem coalition.	
The Yorkshire Post	Liberal Democrats	Endorsed a continuation of the Conservative-Lib Dem coalition.	

==== Northern Irish newspapers ====
Newspaper	Party endorsed	Notes	Link
Belfast Telegraph	None	Encouraged everyone in Northern Ireland to exercise their voting rights.	
Irish News	None		
The News Letter	None	Backed unionist candidates.	

==== Scottish newspapers ====
Newspaper	Party endorsed	Notes	Link
Daily Record	Labour		
The Herald	None	Endorsed no political parties.	
The National	SNP		
Scotland on Sunday	None	Urged voters to 'vote for the party that comes closest to what you believe in'.	
The Scotsman	None	Warned against tactical voting.	
The Scottish Sun	SNP		
Sunday Herald	SNP		
Daily Mail; Mail on Sunday	Conservative	Praise in one article for SNP leader Nicola Sturgeon, but otherwise anti-SNP and tactical for Tories.	

=== Individuals ===
==== Animal Welfare Party ====
- Piers Morgan, journalist and television personality

==== Conservative Party ====
- Michael Bloomberg, American businessman and politician
- Sol Campbell, footballer
- Bob Dudley, American businessman
- Ron Dennis, businessman
- Charles Dunstone, businessman
- George Iacobescu, businessman
- Stuart Rose, businessman
- Tidjane Thiam, French-Ivorian businessman and former politician
- Paul S. Walsh, businessman
- Andrew Lloyd Webber, composer and Conservative member of the House of Lords
- Michael Vaughan, England cricketer

==== Green Party of England and Wales ====
- George Monbiot, writer and environmentalist
- Jack Monroe, writer and social activist
- Grace Petrie. activist and singer-songwriter
- Peter Tatchell, political campaigner and journalist

==== Labour Party ====
- Duncan Bannatyne, businessman and author
- Trevor Beattie, advertising executive
- Jo Brand, comedian, writer, actress and former nurse
- Russell Brand (in England and Wales, except Brighton), comedian, activist
- Michelle Collins, actress
- Steve Coogan, actor and comedian
- Peter Duncan, actor
- Ben Elton, comedian
- Martin Freeman, actor
- Stephen Fry, comedian, writer, actor and presenter
- Stephen Hawking, professor, theoretical physicist, cosmologist, author
- Wayne Hemingway, fashion designer and businessman
- Mathew Horne, actor
- Jason Isaacs, actor
- Eddie Izzard, comedian, actor and writer
- Owen Jones, author, newspaper columnist and commentator
- Kathy Lette, author
- David Morrissey, actor, director, producer and screenwriter
- Susie Orbach, writer and social critic
- Paul O'Grady, broadcaster
- Ronnie O'Sullivan, professional snooker player
- Grayson Perry, artist
- Will Self, author, journalist, broadcaster
- Delia Smith, cook, author and television presenter
- Patrick Stewart, actor
- Harry Styles, singer of One Direction
- David Tennant, actor
- Polly Toynbee, journalist, author
- Dale Vince, entrepreneur
- Robert Webb, comedian

==== Liberal Democrats ====
- John Cleese, actor and comedian

==== Scottish National Party ====
- Dennis Canavan, former Scottish Labour Party and independent politician
- Martin Compston, former footballer and actor
- Brian Cox, actor
- Ian McElhinney, actor
- Tommy Sheridan, former Scottish Socialist Party and Solidarity member of the Scottish Parliament for Glasgow. Co-leader of Solidarity
- Elaine C. Smith, actress and comedian

==== Trade Unionist and Socialist Coalition ====
- Jawad Ahmad, singer, musician and activist

==== UK Independence Party ====
- Richard Desmond, publisher, adult industry businessman
- Nick Griffin, former leader of the British National Party, former MEP
- Tommy Robinson, former leader and founder of the English Defence League, founder of the European Defence League, former Vice-Chairman of British Freedom Party
- Paul Sykes, businessman, philanthropist

=== Organisations ===
==== Conservative Party ====
- Young Republicans International Committee, youth wing of US Republican Party

==== Labour Party ====
- Australian Labor Party, abroad
- Socialist Environment and Resources Association, environmental activist group
- Union of Construction, Allied Trades and Technicians, trade union
- UNISON, trade union
- USDAW, trade union

==== Trade Unionist and Socialist Coalition ====
- National Union of Rail, Maritime and Transport Workers, trade union

==== UKIP ====
- Britain First, far-right 'street-defence' organisation

=== Parties ===
Some parties which only contest elections in certain parts of the United Kingdom have endorsed political parties in areas they don't contest

- The Labour Party (Great Britain) endorsed the Social Democratic and Labour Party in Northern Ireland.
- Plaid Cymru (Wales) endorsed the Green Party in England and the Scottish National Party in Scotland.
- The SNP (Scotland) endorsed the Green Party in England, and Plaid Cymru in Wales.
- The DUP and UUP (Northern Ireland) formed a unionist pact in four seats, with DUP candidates standing in Belfast East and Belfast North, and UUP candidates standing in Fermanagh and South Tyrone and Newry and Armagh.
- The 3 Green Parties in the United Kingdom, the Green Party of England and Wales, the Scottish Green Party and the Green Party in Northern Ireland, endorsed each other in their respective areas.

== Endorsements for individual candidates ==
=== Danny Alexander, Liberal Democrat candidate for Inverness, Nairn, Badenoch and Strathspey ===
- Hugh Grant, actor

=== Ed Balls, Labour Party candidate for Morley and Outwood ===
- PinkNews

=== Nick Clegg, Liberal Democrat candidate for Sheffield Hallam ===
- The Times

=== Oliver Coppard, Labour Party candidate for Sheffield Hallam ===
- Owen Jones, Guardian journalist.
- Ronnie O'Sullivan, professional snooker player

=== Andrew Dismore, Labour Party candidate for Hendon ===
- PinkNews

=== Lynne Featherstone, Liberal Democrat candidate for Hornsey and Wood Green ===
- PinkNews

=== Mike Freer, Conservative Party candidate for Finchley and Golders Green ===
- PinkNews

=== Andrew George, Liberal Democrat candidate for St Ives ===
- Brian May, Guitarist of Queen

=== Naomi Long, Alliance Party candidate for Belfast East ===
- PinkNews

=== Caroline Lucas, Green candidate for Brighton Pavilion ===
- Julia Chanteray, President of the Brighton & Hove Chamber of Commerce
- Tom Burke, environmentalist, former Executive Director of Friends of the Earth
- Tony Juniper, activist, writer, environmentalist
- Charles Secrett, author, environmentalist broadcaster
- Russell Brand, comedian, activist
- David Attenborough, naturalist and broadcaster
- Joanna Lumley, actress and author
- Thom Yorke, musician and songwriter; member of Radiohead
- Brian May, musician, astrophysicist and animal welfare campaigner; member of Queen
- Billy Bragg, singer-songwriter
- Rory Bremner, impressionist and satirist
- Stephen Frears, film director
- Katharine Hamnett, fashion designer
- Jeremy Irons, actor
- Diana Quick, actress
- Bianca Jagger, human rights activist
- Kevin McCloud, Grand Designs presenter
- Alistair McGowan, actor and impressionist
- Cornelia Parker, sculptor and installation artist
- Tracy Worcester, former actress and animal welfare campaigner
- Mark Constantine, founder of Lush cosmetics
- Joseph Corré, co-founder, Agent Provocateur
- John Ashton, former special representative for climate change at the Foreign Office
- Prof. Tim Jackson, sustainable development, University of Surrey
- Jane Goodall, primatologist and UN messenger of peace
- Satish Kumar, former monk and peace activist
- Jeremy Leggett, green energy entrepreneur
- Jonathon Porritt, environmentalist and broadcaster
- Chris Rapley, former director of the Science Museum and the British Antarctic Survey
- Gordon Roddick, founder of 38 Degrees and co-founder, The Big Issue and The Body Shop
- Charles Secrett, former head of Friends of the Earth, England, Wales and Northern Ireland
- Dale Vince, Ecotricity founder
- Sir Tim Smit, co-founder of the Eden Project
- George Monbiot, journalist and author
- Michael Morpurgo, children's author, poet, playwright
- Mark Steel, writer and comedian
- Mark Thomas, comedian and journalist
- PinkNews

=== Maajid Nawaz, Liberal Democrat candidate for Hampstead and Kilburn ===
- David Aaronovitch, journalist
- Richard Dawkins, scientist and writer

=== Derek Wall, Green candidate for Windsor ===
- Democratic Union Party, Syrian Kurdish political party

=== Tom Watson, Labour candidate for West Bromwich East ===
- Hugh Grant, actor

=== Hywel Williams, Plaid Cymru candidate for Arfon ===
- Caroline Lucas, Green candidate for Brighton Pavilion

== See also ==
- Newspaper endorsements in the United Kingdom general election, 2010
- United Kingdom general election, 2010 (Endorsements)
- Endorsements in the United Kingdom general election, 2017
- Endorsements in the 2019 United Kingdom general election
