= Best for Britain =

Civil society campaign to fight Brexit

- Formation: 26 April 2017
- Founders: Gina Miller; Clive Cowdery; Stephen Peel; Eloise Todd
- Type: Civil society group
- Purpose: Improving the UK-EU relationship
- Chairperson: Peter Norris (since 1 January 2024)
- Key people: Naomi Smith (CEO)
- Website: bestforbritain.org

Best for Britain is a civil society campaign formed of researchers, data scientists, strategists, and activists who say that they are working to fix "the problems Britain faces after Brexit". Originally launched on 26 April 2017 to stop Brexit and continue the UK's membership of the European Union (EU), the organisation's aim since 2021 has been strengthening UK-EU ties as well as protecting democratic rights within the UK.

== Aims ==
Prior to the finalisation of Brexit, Best for Britain's goal was a democratic way to stop Brexit. Since 2021, Best for Britain aims to keep the UK open to EU membership in the future, but in the short-term aims at re-engagement with Europe, internationalist policies, and cooperation with business. As part of the organisation's relaunch in April 2021, chief executive Naomi Smith wrote in The Times that the organisation had shifted from a “reactive campaign in response to an emergent threat to Britain’s place in the world” to a “proactive organisation that will stand up against a decline in internationalist values happening again”.

Since 2021, Best for Britain says that it aims to fix the problems Britain faces after Brexit through a combination of evidence gathering, policy creation, public engagement and political campaigning. They aim to secure better outcomes for the UK by seeking improvements to the UK-EU relationship, advocating evidence-based policy recommendations to decision makers.

Best for Britain campaigns to strengthen democratic rights and government accountability within the UK, and opposes restrictions to public right to protest and new barriers to voting. They campaign for reform of the UK's first-past-the-post electoral system and advocate tactical voting until this has been achieved. Best for Britain also acts as a watchdog on reported governmental waste, corruption and scandal.

== Leadership ==
Best for Britain is currently chaired by Peter Norris who is also the Chairman of Virgin Group. It had previously been chaired by former British diplomats Lord Malloch-Brown (2017–2021) and Lord Sir Kim Darroch (2021–2023). Its CEO is Naomi Smith who in 2024 was named among the 100 most influential women in Westminster by House Magazine.

== Campaign activities ==
=== Tell the Remain parties to work together ===
Following the 2019 European elections Best for Britain launched a campaign and petition that called for the leaders of political parties that supported remaining in the EU to work together to achieve that goal.

=== Voter registration campaign for European elections ===
On 8 May 2019, Best for Britain launched a national campaign urging the 7.9 million unregistered eligible voters to sign up before the European elections. Best for Britain CEO, Naomi Smith called the figures “staggering” and said: “These people have a big part to play in the future direction of our country, and we will do everything in our power to ensure their voice is heard on polling day with everyone else's.” Best for Britain also created a tool to help voters register and/or obtain a postal vote.

=== Letters campaign ===
In the first part of 2019, Best for Britain provided support for a nationwide ‘Letters to the Editors’ campaign. This drew upon industry professionals from different sectors, such as midwives and doctors, who signed open letters for local and national publications. These highlighted their concerns about what they saw as the damage being done by Brexit to their fields in particular to the NHS.

=== People's Vote collaboration ===
Best for Britain has partnered with the People's Vote campaign on marches and rallies. On 23 June 2018 Best for Britain supported and participated in the People's Vote march in London to mark the second anniversary of the referendum to leave the European Union. and also supported and participated in the marches in October 2018 and in March and October 2019. The two organisations also held join rallies for supporters in Westminster Central Hall on 23 November 2018 and the Excel Centre on 9 December 2018.

=== Bringing Britain Back Together Again ===
In June 2018, Best for Britain launched its manifesto "Bringing Britain Back Together" to improve public understanding of the process to another referendum, emphasising the "it's still possible to stay" message and drawing attention to what it says was the government's delay and confusion over Brexit. It included an open letter to the country and a road map to stopping Brexit, calling for both sides of the Brexit debate to embrace the idea of another vote to settle the question of the UK's membership of the EU and to avoid the risk that "the entire establishment sleepwalks the country over the Brexit finish line in March 2019".

Best for Britain coupled this manifesto launch with the stated intention to campaign in around 70 key marginal seats, trying to persuade both Labour and Conservative MPs to support a second referendum.

=== When will we know what we voted for? advertising campaign ===
Between March and June 2018, Best for Britain ran an advertising campaign across the UK. It featured citizens asking: "When will we know what we voted for?" The campaign slogan, displayed on billboards and in newspaper ads in Birmingham, Carlisle, Manchester, Liverpool, London and Stoke was: "We all deserve a final say on the Brexit deal." Best for Britain was reported to have spent £500,000 on this campaign.

=== Tactical voting campaign ===
On 19 April 2017 it launched a crowdfunding appeal in an immediate response to Theresa May's announcement of a snap election to be held on 8 June 2017. In April and May, Best for Britain ran what it hoped would be the UK's largest ever tactical voting campaign.

The crowdfunding campaign received donations from more than 10,000 people and raised over £350,000. The tactical vote campaign was launched at a press conference on 26 April by co-founder Gina Miller and then CEO Eloise Todd. Miller said: "We need to prevent MPs and the people being forced into an extreme Brexit that is not in Britain's best interests. ... We will support candidates who campaign for a real final vote on Brexit, including rejecting any deal that leaves Britain worse off." Miller was the chief spokesperson for this campaign.

Miller left Best for Britain after the 2017 election, expressing concern that the group had become more anti-Tory than Brexit-focused and described it as "a room full of white males deciding what's going to happen to the country" and as "undemocratic".

In 2019, the campaign launched a tactical voting tool for the 2019 general election. The tool attracted immediate controversy after claims that its source data lacked transparency, and recommended that voters vote for the Liberal Democrats in seats that that party had never won and where it had polled well behind the main opposition Labour Party in the previous election. However, the recommendations were updated in line with new polling and by late November 83 constituency recommendations had been changed to support Labour candidates instead.

=== APPG Gaps in Support ===
In November 2020, Best for Britain took on the secretariat role of the APPG Gaps in Support, calling for the UK government to ensure nobody was left out from the COVID-19 support packages available for workers and businesses.

A letter was sent to Chancellor Rishi Sunak in February 2021 by a group of 60 MPs calling on the government to consider support proposals drawn up by tax expert Rebecca Seely Harris. Harris was formerly policy adviser at the Office of Tax Simplification, an independent body of HM Treasury.

=== UK Trade and Business Commission ===
In April 2021, Best for Britain launched the UK Trade and Business Commission to scrutinise the UK's trade deals with Europe and the rest of the world. The commission is co-chaired by Peter Norris of the Virgin Group and Hilary Benn. When asked if this would be a replacement for the select committee on the Future Relationship with the European Union previously led by Hilary Benn he said that it would have an “intensely practical focus” on the problems being faced by business.

== Funding ==
In February 2018, it was reported in The Daily Telegraph, and confirmed by Best for Britain, that George Soros, through his foundations, had contributed £400,000 to the campaign. The Telegraph's report was described as an "antisemitic dogwhistle" and also criticised for calling Best for Britain's public aim to stop Brexit a "secret plot". In response, Best for Britain launched a crowdfunder, which raised over £200,000 and led to Soros donating a further £100,000.
