= Open Britain =

British campaigning organization

- Predecessor: Britain Stronger in Europe
- Headquarters: Millbank Tower, 21–24 Millbank, London, England, SW1P 4QP
- Owner: PV Campaign Ltd (75%) (until 2022); Mark Kieran (since 2022)
- Affiliations: People's Vote (historically)
- Website: open-britain.co.uk

Open Britain is a British political campaign group that was set up in the aftermath of the 2016 European Union referendum to advocate for pro-European politics.

== Background ==
Following the 2016 EU referendum in the United Kingdom, the official remain campaign group, Britain Stronger in Europe, changed its name on 25 August 2016 to Open Britain. In October 2016, Open Britain called for the UK to remain in the European single market as part of the outcome of the Brexit negotiations, and also launched a 'Write to Remain' letter-writing campaign directed at Theresa May asking her to guarantee the right of EU nationals to stay in the UK.

The individuals involved with the campaign group have included former government ministers such as Pat McFadden (Labour) and Norman Lamb (Liberal Democrat). Conservatives Anna Soubry, Nicky Morgan, and Dominic Grieve cut their ties with Open Britain in April 2017 after it began to campaign against the re-election of anti-EU members of parliament, mostly Conservatives.

In April 2018, Open Britain was involved with the launch and promotion of the People's Vote campaign for a second referendum.

In October 2019, executive director James McGrory and director Tom Baldwin were forced out of the organisation by Chairperson Roland Rudd. Following this, most directors resigned, and as the lead organisation behind the People's Vote campaign, this led to a major staff walkout in protest.

== Leadership ==
The organisation's past leadership has included Trevor Phillips, Richard Reed, Lord Peter Mandelson, Roland Rudd, June Sarpong, William Straw, and Sir Michael Rake as directors of the company.

Mark Kieran currently leads the organisation.

== Stop the Rot ==
In 2022 Open Britain began a campaign called 'Stop The Rot' promising "Enough is Enough - Johnson Must Go Join the #StopTheRot Summer of Action".. The campaign to remove Boris Johnson was backed by 'Fairvote UK' and 'Let's Take Back Control Ltd' run by campaigner Kyle Gregory Taylor, a former candidate for the Advance Together party in the 2019 general election.
