= The Muslim Vote =

British pressure group

Logo of The Muslim Vote

The Muslim Vote is a British pressure group established in December 2023 that seeks to consolidate the electoral influence of Muslims living in the UK and put "Muslim issues at the forefront" of British politics. During the 2024 UK general election, it commonly supported independent and third party candidates who opposed the Conservative and Labour leadership stances on the Gaza war, among other policy positions. Since then, it has increased focus particularly on domestic issues and Islamophobia (politically referred to as 'anti-Muslim hate'), funding husting events, endorsing supportive candidates, and leading election GOTV campaigns within Muslim communities during various local and high profile by-elections across the UK.

== Background ==
Historically, the British Muslim electorate has been largely aligned with the Labour Party, which received positive support for its grassroots connections with ethnic minorities, and public anti-discrimination posture with regards to workers rights and immigration.

A survey of Muslim voters reported that 86% voted Labour in the 2019 general election. After Labour initially supported Israeli military action in the Gaza war following the 2023 Hamas-led attack on Israel, widespread discontent emerged among political third parties, Muslim Labour MPs, and British Muslim organisations over Westminster's response. Then Labour Party leader Keir Starmer faced growing backlash from British media and NGOs, particularly for his initial reluctance to call for a ceasefire, and for comments made during an LBC interview that were perceived by the Muslim pro-Palestine community as supportive of Israel enacting collective punishment on the Gaza population as self-defence.

Support for the party quickly fell among Muslims, with a poll by Survation finding only 43% saying they would vote Labour in the upcoming election. BBC analysis of the 2024 local elections results said that Labour voteshare had fallen 21 percentage points in council wards where more than 20% of residents are Muslim and analysis by Number Cruncher Politics found that Labour lost 33 percentage points in majority-Muslim areas.

== History ==
The Muslim Vote was launched in December 2023. It is "modelled along the lines of Operation Black Vote". Its then national co-ordinator, Abubakr Nanabawa, was previously a Labour activist as a student at the University of Birmingham. The former leader of Hizb ut-Tahrir Britain and current podcaster Jalaluddin Patel, said he helped The Muslim Vote, and Anas Altikriti said he advised it.

In May 2024, it released a list of eighteen demands for the Labour leader Keir Starmer, including apologising for his previous stance on the Gaza war.

The organisation's May 2024 launch in Wales was supported by local branches of the Palestine Solidarity Campaign and the Stop the War Coalition.

In May and June 2024 it endorsed candidates in the 2024 general election. It says it chose candidates who oppose the UK government's approach to "the ongoing genocide and apartheid in Gaza" alongside a list of other priorities relating to funding for public services; religious sensitivity in school classrooms; and opposition to the government's counter-extremism programme 'Prevent'. The Muslim Vote said that voters should consider alternative parties, or spoil their ballots as a "register of dissatisfaction" if they do not have a "pro-Palestine, pro-peace" candidate.

The organisation was criticised by some Muslims for supporting four Labour MPs who voted for a motion that called for a ceasefire in Gaza, manifesting an outcome of the polarising divide between party MPs and the leadership stance during the first few months of the Israeli military onslaught.

The independent candidates endorsed by The Muslim Vote received over 462,728 votes in the election (1.61%), and were elected in 5 constituencies, an anomalously high number in British general election history. Jeremy Corbyn, Ayoub Khan, Adnan Hussain, Iqbal Mohamed, Shockat Adam outright defeated incumbent Labour candidates, which included former Shadow Cabinet minister Jonathan Ashworth in Liecester South, and former MP Kate Hollern in Blackburn. In addition to the independent victories, TMV successfully endorsed 45 other winning candidates, including from the Liberal Democrats, the Green Party, and many others. Notable figures included former co-leader of the Green Party Carla Denyer in Bristol Central, and British-Palestinian Layla Moran in Oxford West and Abingdon.

The Muslim Vote endorsed the Green Party for the Gorton and Denton by-election held in February 2026.

== Reception ==
The Muslim Vote has been supported by a number of Muslim organisations including:

- Muslim Association of Britain (MAB)
- Muslim Council of Scotland
- Muslim Council of Wales
- Muslim Engagement and Development (MEND)

Two of the organisations supporting the group, MAB and MEND, were named by former Conservative Secretary Michael Gove as being assessed against a new non-statutory definition of extremism. No formal designation or penalties were applied before the dissolution of Parliament in May 2024.

The Conservative politicians Andrew Percy and Iain Duncan Smith called the organisation a "threat to democracy", and the Labour politician Tan Dhesi said they were trying to "import toxic politics of persuading people to vote based on religion". Stephen Evans of the National Secular Society called on the Labour Party to ignore the demands of The Muslim Vote, stating that the organisation "represent themselves, not Muslim voters", adding that Muslims are not a monolithic voting bloc and warning that "abandoning universalism to pander to this kind of sectarianism would be dangerous and divisive".

Some British media outlets have framed the group as a grassroots campaign and mobilisation effort, with the organisation maintaining it is "not a religious group and not representative of all Muslims".

== See also ==
- Independent Alliance (UK)
- Gaza war protest vote movements
- Islamophobia in the United Kingdom
- 2024 United Kingdom general election
