= The Hemp Trading Company =

British clothing company

THTC (The Hemp Trading Company)
- Industry: clothing retailer
- Founded: 1999
- Founders: Drew Lawson, Gavin Lawson and Daniel Sodergren.
- Headquarters: London, W3; United Kingdom
- Products: Apparel
- Website: www.thtc.co.uk

THTC (The Hemp Trading Company) is an ethically driven underground clothing label, specialising in environmentally friendly, politically conscious street wear made of hemp, bamboo, organic cotton and other sustainable fabrics. It was founded by brothers Drew (Dru) and Gav Lawson, and Dan Sodegren in 1999.

== Origins ==
The Hemp Trading Company had its origins in Hempology, a "hemp awareness group" at University of Hull. Offshoots of the group appeared on other campuses, helping consolidate the brand's clubbing and music image. In 1999, the founders, brothers Dru and Gav Lawson and their friend, Dan Sodergren, then set up their business in Bristol and London.

== Company history ==
In 2008, Jeremy Smith, editor of The Ecologist said that when he started at the magazine in 2001, the general idea of fashionable clothing that was also environmentally friendly was "laughable," but that the Lawson brothers had proved this wrong. He is quoted as saying: "While everyone else seemed to be making ill fitting and deeply unflattering clothes that wouldn't make it into a Littlewoods catalogue, they were – years before anyone else that I knew of – actually responding to what the young people with whom they remain so connected wanted to be seen wearing. Now of course every Kate, Sienna and Lily wants to be seen in green, but for me it will always be THTC that got there first and did and said it best."

In addition to hemp, THTC clothing uses bamboo and organic cotton.

The firm networked widely with DJs, MCs, musicians and celebrities, to build up their business. In 2006 they were shortlisted for The Observer's annual Ethical Fashion Awards partly due to the support of Woody Harrelson, who was on the judging panel. By 2008 they had produced merchandise for the bands Beardyman, Morcheeba and Braintax, widening their customer reach and increasing awareness of sustainable design. By 2011, the company had an annual turnover of £100,000 and a London-based team of nine staff, and their clothing had been worn by people as diverse as the performance poet Benjamin Zephaniah, the American rap group De La Soul, and the actor Brad Pitt.

In 2012 THTC collaborated with the Soil Association, Carbon Trust and Fair Wear Foundation to produce a line of shirts made from 100% organic, hand-harvested cotton, specifically produced using wind power and stated to have a carbon footprint that was 90% smaller than that of more typically produced equivalents. Some of the earliest THTC designs were explicitly political, such as a slogan reading "George Bush & son, family butchers (est.1989)" This combination of political activism, urban music, and street art is central to the brand, which also produces clothing with prints designed by street artists such as the British graffiti artist Mau Mau.

== See also ==
- The Hempest
