= Rachel Coldicutt =

British technology expert

Rachel Coldicutt OBE
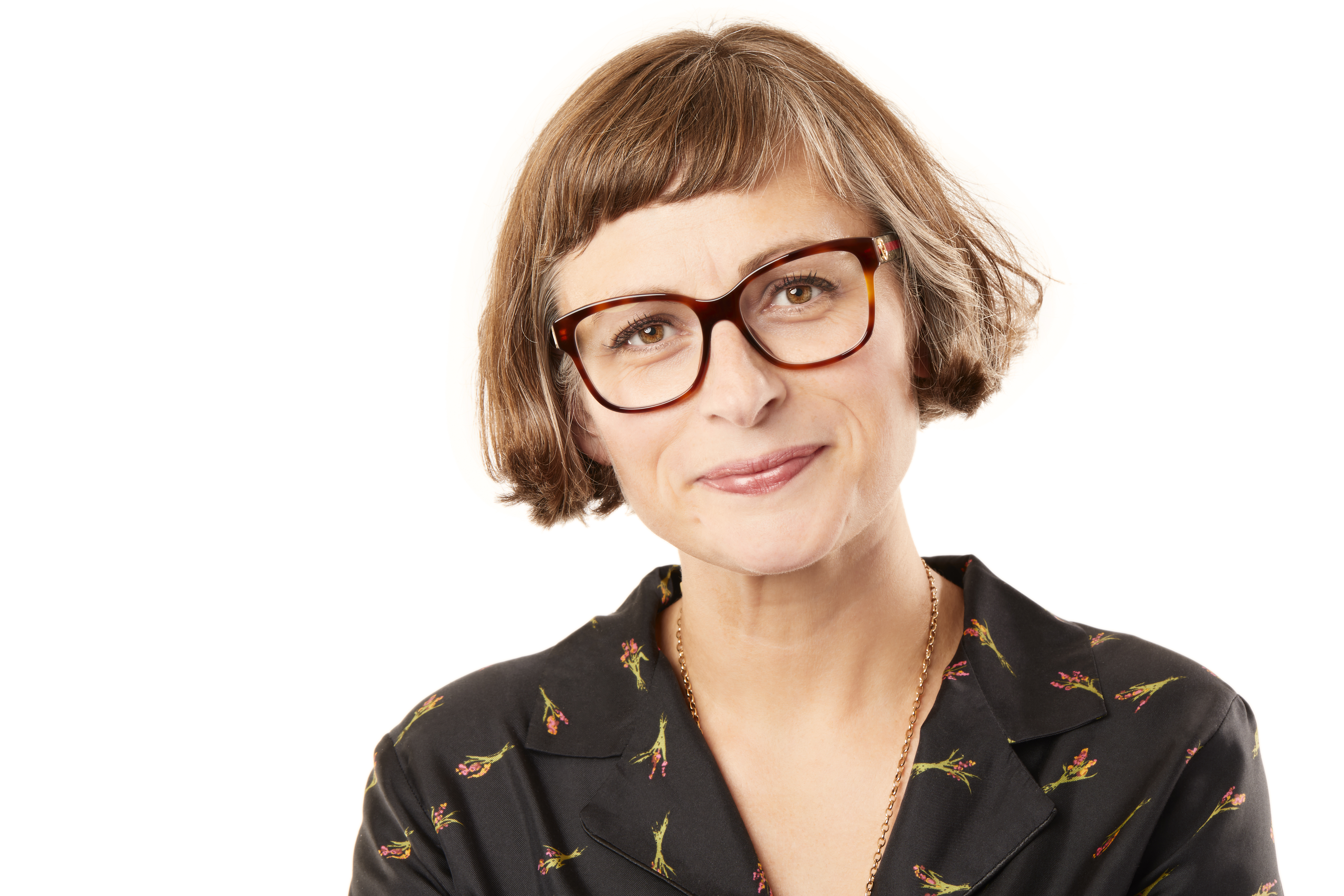
- Education: University of Cambridge (BA)
- Employer(s): Doteveryone; BBC; Royal Opera House; Encyclopædia Britannica Oxford University Press
- Notable work: She serves on the Ethics Taskforce of The Law Society and the Royal Academy of Engineering.
- Awards: Order of the British Empire (2020)
- Website: www.rachelcoldicutt.com

Rachel Coldicutt OBE is a British technology expert who works on ethics, regulation and the social impacts of technology. She is the former chief executive officer of Doteveryone, a UK-based responsible technology think tank. Her career has focussed on transforming emerging technologies into products and services particularly developing new forms of expression for cultural institutions. Coldicutt is a trustee of Battersea Arts Centre and a member of the Ofcom Content Board. She previously was on the Ethics Taskforce of the Law Society and the Royal Academy of Engineering.

== Education ==
Coldicutt studied English at King's College, Cambridge and graduated in 1995.

== Career ==
She worked as a database assistant at Oxford University Press and the Cassell Concise Dictionary. In 1997 she joined Microsoft Encarta, where she worked as an editor and proof-reader. She continued to work as a copy-editor, supporting authors in a range of different subjects. She started her career as a lexicographer, where she supported dictionaries and encyclopaedias transition into CD-ROMs.

Coldicutt works on transforming emerging technologies into products and systems. In 1999 she joined Encyclopædia Britannica, as an online history editor. After briefly working at BT Openworld on their Entertainment and Lifestyle content Coldicutt joined the BBC, where she was teens editor, running the young adult portal "So...". In this capacity she supported hundreds of thousands of teenagers in learning how to interact with one another online.

In 2003, Coldicutt joined the Victoria and Albert Museum and Channel 4 as Project Manager for Every Object Tells A Story. Every Object Tells A Story was an interactive project that digitised 1,600 objects from V&A collections alongside inviting members of the public to submit their own stories and experiences of the objects. The online collection brought together national treasures and every day objects, as well as expert insight and personal anecdotes. In 2005 she launched the first podcast of any UK museum. In 2006 she worked as an multi-platform editor for several television shows, including the reality show Big Brother. At the same time worked freelance for the Royal Opera House (ROH), before formerly joining as Head of Digital Media in 2008. Coldicutt was responsible for developing new technologies and social media strategies to bring opera and ballet to new audiences. She led the ROH in being one of the first cultural institutions on YouTube, as well as developing content to make opera more accessible. In 2009 Coldicutt and the ROH stage an opera through Twitter, encouraging people to submit 140 character tweets to form a new libretto.

In 2011, Coldicutt and Katy Beale founded Caper, a creative agency that made content for the Southbank Centre and Royal Shakespeare Company. While at Caper Coldicutt co-founded Culture Hack Day, an event that brought together the culture and tech sector. In 2012 they led the Happenstance project that provided residencies for tech workers to join arts organisations.

From 2015, Coldicutt was chief executive officer for Doteveryone, a responsible tech think tank founded by Martha Lane Fox. She joined in the early days of the organisation, with interests to democratise and open access to the internet. Doteveryone looks to make technology responsible through internet regulation and educating those working in technology on how to mitigate the unintended consequences of their products. Doteveryone have research the public attitudes of British people to technology. Having identified that UK tech workers frequently leave their jobs due to ethical concerns, Coldicutt argued that there is a business case for developing more ethical tech products.

There are almost one hundred organisations in the United Kingdom that look to regulate technology and data, but they are not well connected to other sectors, and scandals such as Cambridge Analytica's interference with political campaigns increase public distrust. Doteveryone has proposed offering tech and ethics training to regulatory bodies, such as those working in electoral fairness. Coldicutt has spoken about the need for internet companies to be held accountable for their actions. In 2017 she delivered a TED talk about how to be "good" at the internet. She was named as one of the UK's Top 50 Most Influential Women in Technology in 2019. In 2020 Coldicutt left Doteveryone to concentrate on writing a book about equality, climate change and automation.

In 2025, Coldicutt launched the Society for Hopeful Technologists, which aims to connect, activate and strengthen technologists with positive visions of technology with skills, knowledge, resources and networks to demystify tech, inspire and support best practice.

=== Awards and honours ===
Coldicutt was made an Officer of the Order of the British Empire in the 2020 New Year Honours for services to technology.
