= Ella's Kitchen =

Food company

Ella's Kitchen (Brands) Limited
- Trade name: Ella's Kitchen
- Formerly: C2'S Productions Limited (2004–2005)
- Company type: Private
- Founded: August 19, 2004; 21 years ago in Reading, Berkshire, England, UK
- Founder: Paul Lindley
- Headquarters: Henley-on-Thames, Oxfordshire, England, UK
- Products: Organic baby and toddler food
- Number of employees: 62
- Parent: Ella's Kitchen Group Limited
- Website: ellaskitchen.co.uk

Ella's Kitchen (Brands) Limited, trading as Ella's Kitchen, is a company that makes organic baby and toddler food, sold in through retail and e-commerce internationally. Founded in 2004, the company was purchased by Hain Celestial Group in 2013.

== History ==
Ella's Kitchen was started by Paul Lindley in 2004, naming the brand after his daughter Ella. He left his job as managing director at Nickelodeon and launched the business with personal savings. The first store to launch the organic baby food was Sainsbury's in 2006. Original advertising was done through Nickelodeon whom he offered a share of revenue in exchange for free advertising.

In 2009, the company expanded to Sweden, Norway, and the United States and by 2014 was the UK's best-selling baby food company. The company was purchased by Hain Celestial Group in 2013 and became part of the company's global infant, toddler and kids division.

== Products ==
Ella's Kitchen manufactures and distributes organic baby food. It has approximately 80 branded food products including baby and toddler food, smoothies, snack ranges and more. It was the first brand to bring pouches to the baby food market.
