= Paul Lindley =

British entrepreneur and children's welfare campaigner

Paul Lindley OBE
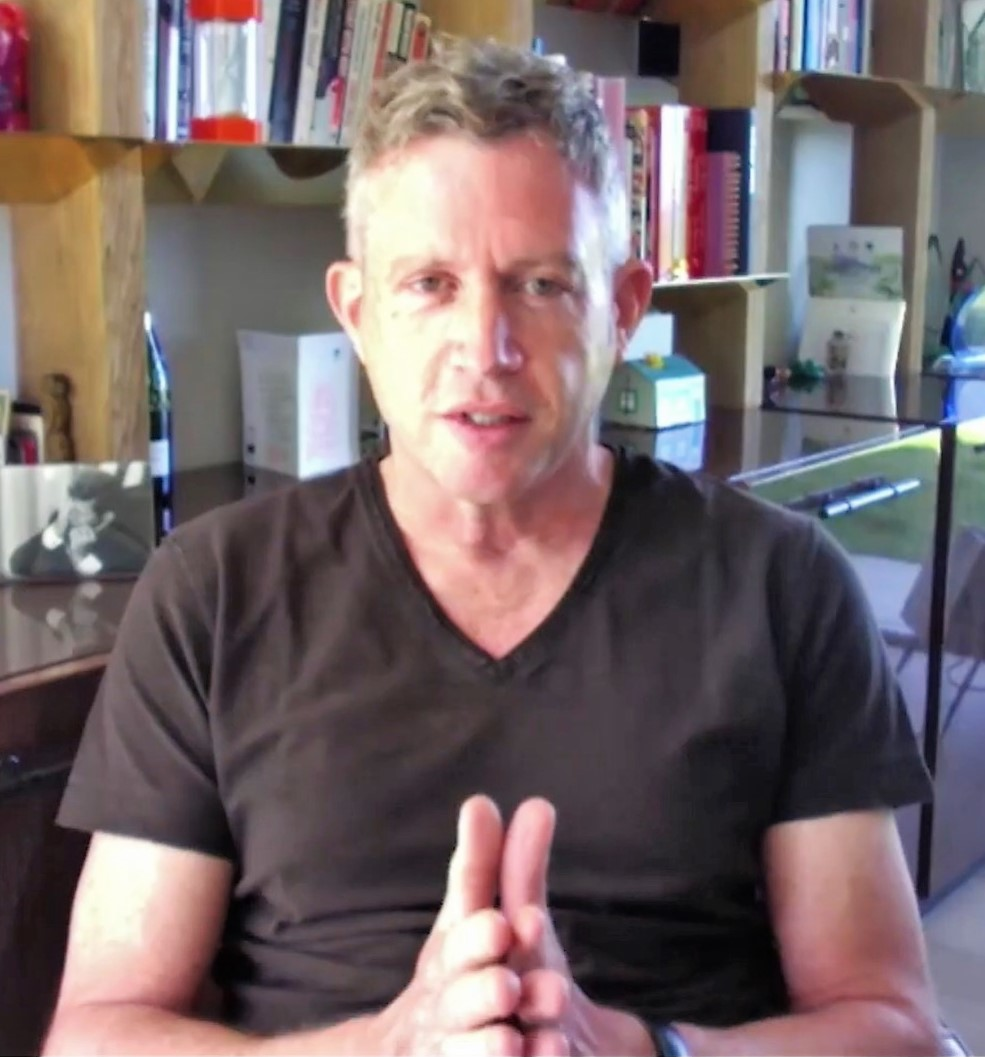
- Lindley speaks to the British Library in 2021
- Born: Paul John Lindley; 17 October 1966 (age 60); Sheffield, England, England, UK
- Occupation: Founder of Ella's Kitchen
- Spouse: Alison Lindley
- Children: 2

Paul John Lindley OBE (born 17 October 1966) is a British entrepreneur and children's welfare campaigner. He founded organic baby and children's food brand Ella's Kitchen in 2006, naming it after his daughter, and later launched organic toddler toiletries brand Paddy's Bathroom, named after his son. He is an author of a best-selling book Little Wins: The Power of Thinking Like a Toddler and is a co-founder of a social enterprise called The Key is E with former child soldier and international hip-hop artist Emmanuel Jal. He was previously deputy managing director of Nickelodeon UK.

== Early life ==
Paul John Lindley was born on 17 October 1966 in Sheffield, England and moved to Lusaka, Zambia when he was eight years old. He attended the International School of Lusaka, Barlborough Hall School and Mount St Mary's College in Derbyshire, UK.

== Career ==
Paul graduated from the University of Bristol with a degree in economics and politics then qualified as a chartered accountant at KPMG in London and Los Angeles. He then spent nine years at children's television channel Nickelodeon, where he rose from financial controller to deputy managing director of its UK business.

Paul set up Ella's Kitchen in 2004 and its products were launched in UK supermarkets almost two years later. Ella's Kitchen now has a presence in 35 territories and a 28 per cent market share, making it the biggest baby food brand by value in the UK and with a global turnover of more than $100m.

In 2009, Paul co-founded the Consumer Forum with a number of other entrepreneurs with high-growth businesses. From 2011 the forum has been developing a tax relief proposal to encourage small businesses to better understand their customers’ needs, maximise their trademark asset and build more world-class British brands. Paul continues to lobby the UK Government to adopt the relief as part of its economic growth strategies.

In November 2011, Paul was guest editor of The Grocer, the UK's leading food industry publication. His issue encouraged the UK Government to better support small food businesses and to address the country's obesity problem, especially with regard to children.

In January 2012, Paul joined “Business in You” a partnership between private enterprise and Government to support start-ups and growing businesses and encourage entrepreneurship. Four months later he was appointed an ambassador to the Family and Parenting Institute, a charity dedicated to making Britain a more family-friendly nation. In November, Paul wrote an article for The Daily Telegraph about flexible working and solving the problem of the one million British 16- to 24-year-olds not in employment, education or training through social entrepreneurship.

The Hain Celestial Group (NASDAQ: HAIN), a NASDAQ listed health-focused FMCG company, acquired Ella's Kitchen in May of that year. In September, Leicester City Council conducted a year-long pilot trial in the city of ideas and themes emerging from the Averting A Recipe For Disaster report. The following spring, it launched an initiative called Start Smart which promoted the importance of healthy eating for the under-fives.

In May 2022, the University of Reading announced that Paul would be succeeding William Waldegrave as chancellor of the university in July 2022.

== Charitable work and campaigning ==
In February 2013, Paul Lindley led the Averting A Recipe For Disaster report, a long-term, cross-party plan sponsored by Ella's Kitchen to improve nutrition nationally for the under-fives. The report included comments and support from representatives of the food and health industries, charity sector and media. The report has formed the basis of a campaign led by Ella's Kitchen to introduce young children to healthier lifestyles by pressuring the Government, businesses and individuals to work together.

In the run-up to the 2015 UK General Election, Paul lobbied the main political parties to commit to appointing an independent advisor to review health, nutrition and food education policies for the under fives and establish a more co-ordinated approach towards their welfare. The Conservatives, Labour and the Liberal Democrats included this promise in their respective manifestos.

Paul Lindley sits on the Santander SME advisory board and is an ambassador for the Family and Childcare Trust. Between 2013 and 2015, he served as a counsellor at One Young World, a non-profit organisation that brings together the world's future leaders at a 2,000 person, 190 nation, annual summit to discuss their ideas for solving the world's most pressing problems.

He launched social enterprise The Key is E in partnership with South Sudanese musician, former child soldier and political activist Emmanuel Jal in 2014. The Key is E uses education and entrepreneurship, to empower and engage Africa's brightest. In 2015, the organisation launched 'The Key is E' documentary, Directed by Sebastian Thiel.

Paul is a Chairman of Robert F Kennedy Human Rights (RFKHR) UK founded by Bobby Kennedy's widow.

He is 7 years into a 25-year commitment to cycle from Oxfordshire, England to Sydney, Australia - with over 100 others to support One More Child, a charity that provides education, shelter, aspiration, mentorship and love to street children in Jinja, Uganda.

In March 2018, Paul Lindley has been appointed Chair of the London Child Obesity Taskforce by the Mayor of London, Sadiq Khan. A new taskforce aims to combat the epidemic of childhood obesity across the capital and close the health inequality gap across the city.

== Recognition ==
Paul has won several awards for his role in Ella's Kitchen, including Entrepreneur of the Year at the 2011 National Business Awards, Ernst & Young Entrepreneur of the Year 2011 in the London and South Region, Business Person of the Year at the 2011 Oxfordshire Business Awards., Entrepreneur of the Year at the 2012 City AM Awards, Entrepreneur of the Year at the 2012 Pride of Reading Awards. In 2012 Paul was awarded the South East Director of the Year for Small and Medium Businesses Award at IoD Director of the Year Awards. In October 2013, Paul won the Institute of Directors Director of the Year award for SME businesses.

In 2012, Management Today referenced Paul as one of the 'Top 50 entrepreneurs to follow on Twitter'.

In July 2013, Paul received an honorary doctorate degree from the University of Reading for his contribution to improving children's health and his work as an entrepreneur.

Paul was appointed an Officer of the Order of the British Empire (OBE) in the 2019 New Year Honours for services to Exports in the Food and Drink Sector and to Children's Welfare.
