= Rebecca Atkinson-Lord =

British theater and film director and writer

Rebecca Atkinson-Lord is a British theater and film director and writer.

She grew up in Wolverhampton and was a scholarship pupil at St Dominic's High School for Girls in Brewood, Staffordshire. She read ancient history at the University of Bristol. before training as a theater director at RADA.

In 2008 she founded Arch 468, a theatre production and development hub in Brixton.

In 2010 she was appointed co Director of Theatre at Ovalhouse in London

She was nominated for the 2012 Offie for Best Director for her production of Cuddles by Joseph Wilde at Ovalhouse. The production subsequently toured the UK before transferring to 59E59 Theatres in Manhattan in 2015 where it was awarded a New York Times Critic's Pick and named as one of the best theater shows of 2015 by the New York Times. In May 2016 Nicole Kidman and her production company Blossom Films announced that she had optioned the rights to "Cuddles" and that Wilde would be adapting the play for screen.

Since February 2015, she has been a regular contributor to The Guardian newspaper's online theatre blog and has written extensively on theatre and arts politics issues for both The Guardian and The Stage newspapers.

In November 2015 Atkinson-Lord and her co-director Rachel Briscoe announced that they were stepping down from Ovalhouse to concentrate on individual projects.

In September 2017, Atkinson-Lord's first film, "Domesticity", written by Chisa Hutchinson, won the award for Best Micro Drama at London's Discover.film Festival.

In May 2021 Atkinson-Lord was appointed Artistic Director and Chief Executive of An Tobar & Mull Theatre on the Isle of Mull in the Scottish Hebrides.
