= Endorsements in the 2019 United Kingdom general election =

  - 2010 general election
  - Endorsements
  - 2015 general election
  - Endorsements
  - 2017 general election
  - Endorsements
  - 2019 general election
  - Endorsements
  - 2024 general election
  - Endorsements

Various newspapers, organisations and individuals endorsed parties or individual candidates for the 2019 United Kingdom general election.

== Endorsements for parties ==
=== Newspapers and magazines ===
==== National daily newspapers ====
Newspaper	Endorsement	Notes	Link
Daily Express	Conservative Party		
Daily Mail	Conservative Party		
Daily Mirror	Labour Party		
The Daily Telegraph	Conservative Party		
Financial Times	None	"To those candidates who share [internationalist, pro business and liberal] values – and are ready to fight for them – the FT lends its wholehearted support."	
The Guardian	Labour Party	Advocated voting for "candidates who can defeat the Tories" where Labour cannot win.	
i	None		
The Independent	None	Endorsed tactical voting "in an effort to deny Mr Johnson that majority."	
Morning Star	Labour Party		
The Sun	Conservative Party		
The Times	Conservative Party		

==== National Sunday newspapers ====
Newspaper	Endorsement	Notes	Link
The Observer	None	Encouraged readers to vote for "pro-referendum, progressive" candidates in order to stop a Conservative majority.	
Sunday Express	Conservative Party		
The Sunday Mirror	Labour Party		
The Sunday People	Labour Party		
The Sun on Sunday	Conservative Party		
The Sunday Telegraph	Conservative Party		
The Sunday Times	Conservative Party		

==== National weekly newspapers ====
Newspaper	Endorsement	Notes	Link
The Jewish Chronicle	None	Opposed Labour leader Jeremy Corbyn becoming prime minister.	

==== National political magazines ====
Publication	Endorsement	Notes	Link
The Economist	Liberal Democrats		
New Statesman	None	Endorsed tactical voting against the Conservatives. Called Jeremy Corbyn "unfit to be prime minister".	
Red Pepper	Labour Party		
Socialist Standard	Socialist Party of Great Britain	Called on voters to write "world socialism" on their ballot outside the two constituencies contested.	
The Spectator	Conservative Party		

==== Other national publications ====
Publication	Endorsement	Notes	Link
Dazed	Labour Party	Bi-monthly style magazine	
gal-dem	Labour Party	Publication sharing perspectives from women and non-binary people of colour	
Huck	Labour Party	Bi-monthly arts and lifestyle magazine	
Peace News	Green Party	Supported parties that proposed a green new deal.	
Peace News	Labour Party	Supported parties that proposed a green new deal.	
Peace News	Plaid Cymru	Supported parties that proposed a green new deal.	
The Quietus	Labour Party	Music and pop culture magazine	
Socialist Appeal	Labour Party	Trotskyist publication	
Vice	Labour Party	Cultural/lifestyle magazine	

==== Northern Irish newspapers ====
Newspaper	Endorsement	Notes	Link
Irish News	None	Supported candidates who support remaining in the European Union.	

==== Regional newspapers ====
Publication	Endorsement	Notes	Link
Evening Standard	Conservative Party	Free daily London newspaper	
Liverpool Echo	Labour Party	Daily newspaper covering Liverpool and Merseyside	

=== Individuals ===
==== Brexit Party ====
- Derek Chisora, boxer

==== Conservative Party ====
- Ian Austin, former independent and Labour MP
- Arron Banks, businessman and co-founder of Leave.EU
- Gareth Bennett, independent and former UKIP AM
- Carl Benjamin, YouTuber and former UKIP candidate
- Catherine Blaiklock, founder and former leader of the Brexit Party
- Roy Chubby Brown, stand-up comedian
- Douglas Carswell, former independent, UKIP and Conservative MP
- Bill Etheridge, former UKIP and Brexit Party MEP
- Lance Forman, independent and former Brexit Party MEP
- Bobby George, darts player
- David Goodhart, journalist
- Darren Grimes, commentator and activist
- Lucy Harris, independent and former Brexit Party MEP
- Tom Harris, former Labour MP
- Katie Hopkins, media personality and columnist
- Bernard Ingham, journalist
- Claude Littner, business executive
- John Longworth, independent and former Brexit Party MEP and chairman of Leave Means Leave
- Tim Martin, businessman and founder of Wetherspoons
- Piers Morgan, broadcaster
- Geoff Norcott, comedian
- Annunziata Rees-Mogg, independent and former Brexit Party MEP
- Tommy Robinson, far-right activist and co-founder of the English Defence League
- Tim Stanley, journalist and historian
- Gisela Stuart, former Labour MP, chair of Change Britain and former chair of Vote Leave
- Alan Sugar, business magnate, media personality and former Labour Peer, now a crossbench peer
- John Woodcock, former independent and Labour MP
- Vladimir Zhirinovsky, Russian politician and leader of the Liberal Democratic Party of Russia

==== Green Party ====
- John Cleese, actor and comedian
- Richard Dawkins, ethologist, evolutionary biologist, and author (also endorsed the Liberal Democrats, SNP, and Plaid Cymru)
- Hugh Fearnley-Whittingstall, celebrity chef, television personality, journalist and food writer
- Liam Gallagher, musician and songwriter
- George Monbiot, writer and political activist (also endorsed Labour)

==== Labour Party ====
- Lawrence Abu Hamdan, contemporary artist
- Lolly Adefope, comedian
- Akala, rapper
- Lily Allen, singer-songwriter
- Gar Alperovitz, American historian and economist
- Amir Amirani, director
- Li Andersson, Finnish politician and Minister for Education
- Ulla Andersson, Swedish politician
- Adjoa Andoh, actor
- Kehinde Andrews, academic
- Katherine Angel, academic and writer
- Keith Armstrong, author and poet
- Oreet Ashery, artist
- Katy B, singer-songwriter
- Danny Baker, radio DJ
- Ronan Bennett, writer
- Big Narstie, musician
- Lethal Bizzle, rapper
- Grace Blakeley, author and economics commentator
- David Blanchflower, economist
- David Blandy, artist
- Mark Blyth, economist
- Billy Bragg, singer-songwriter and activist
- Sam Byers, novelist
- Victoria Chick, economist
- Diana Chire, artist and director
- Noam Chomsky, American linguist and philosopher
- Julie Christie, actress and activist
- Chipo Chung, actress
- Joan Collins, Irish politician
- Andy Croft, writer, editor and poet
- Caryl Churchill, playwright
- Jasmina Cibic, performance, installation and film artist
- Steve Coogan, comedian and actor (not in all constituencies)
- Christine Cooper, economist
- Rafael Correa, former president of Ecuador
- Nicola Coughlan, Irish actress
- Angela Davis, American political activist and academic
- Fabio De Masi, German politician and economist
- Rob Delaney, comedian
- Robert Del Naja, musician and graffiti artist
- Panicos Demetriades, Cypriot economist
- Danny DeVito, American actor, director, producer, and filmmaker
- Leena Dhingra, television actress
- Danny Dorling, social geographer
- Joe Dunthorne, novelist and poet
- Tom Dyckhoff, journalist and television presenter
- Will Eaves, author
- Michael Eavis, dairy farmer and founder of the Glastonbury festival
- David Edgar, playwright
- Travis Elborough, writer
- Brian Eno, musician
- Íñigo Errejón, Spanish politician
- Ali Esbati, Swedish politician and columnist
- Miatta Fahnbulleh, chief executive of the New Economics Foundation
- Adham Faramawy, artist
- Andrew Feinstein, former South African politician
- Mark Fell, music producer and artist
- Shiva Feshareki, experimental composer
- Jem Finer, musician
- Liza Fior, architect
- Liam Fray, musician
- Stephen Frears, film director
- Selma James, American writer and feminist
- Jumpin Jack Frost, DJ and record producer
- Guy Garvey, singer, songwriter and radio presenter
- Tefere Gebre, Ethiopian-American union leader
- Geeneus, DJ
- Ghetts, grime MC
- Tariq Goddard, novelist and publisher
- John Goodby, chemist
- Antony Gormley, sculptor
- Nikhil Goyal, American writer
- David Graeber, American anthropologist and anarchist
- John Grahl, economist
- Matthew Green, Canadian politician
- Professor Green, rapper and singer-songwriter
- Stephany Griffith-Jones, economist
- Patrick Harrington, political activist
- Sofie Hagen, comedian
- Peter Hallward, philosopher
- Barbara Harriss-White, economist
- David Harrison, artist
- M. John Harrison, author and critic
- Douglas Hart, musician
- Owen Hatherley, journalist and writer
- Chris Hayes, American journalist
- Charles Hayward, musician
- Libby Heaney, artist, physicist and lecturer
- Edwin Heathcote, architect
- Tony Heaton, artist
- Peter Herbert, barrister
- Kevin Higgins, Irish poet
- Susan Himmelweit, economist
- Peter Hobbs, novelist
- Richard Hollis, graphic designer
- Peter Hooton, singer
- Srećko Horvat, Croatian philosopher
- House House, Australian video game developer
- Michael Hrebeniak, academic, author, jazz musician and journalist
- Joseph Huber, German economist
- Will Hutton, economist (endorsed Liberal Democrats in some constituencies)
- Timothy Hyman, artist
- Pablo Iglesias Turrión, Spanish politician
- Eddie Izzard, comedian and actor
- Lars Iyer, novelist and philosopher
- Michael Jacobs, economist
- Juliet Jacques, journalist
- Jamelia, recording artist and television presenter
- Gus John, writer
- Linton Kwesi Johnson, dub poet
- Fred Johnston, Irish writer
- Richard Jolly, economist
- Owen Jones, journalist, author and political activist
- Meena Kandasamy, Indian poet
- Kano, rapper
- Asif Kapadia, film director
- Anish Kapoor, contemporary artist
- Ronnie Kasrils, South African politician
- Aki Kaurismäki, Finnish film director
- Roz Kaveney, writer, critic and poet
- John Keane, artist
- Shaun Keaveny, broadcaster
- Steve Keen, Australian economist
- Patrick Keiller, film director
- Peter Kennard, photomontage artist
- A. L. Kennedy, author and comedian
- Laleh Khalili, Iranian American academic
- Sharon Kivland, American-British artist
- Naomi Klein, Canadian author, social activist, and filmmaker
- Hanif Kureishi, playwright, screenwriter and novelist
- Francesco Laforgia, Italian politician
- Kate Lamb, actor
- Mark Leckey, artist
- Lawrence Lek, multimedia artist
- Mike Leigh, film and theatre writer
- Dua Lipa, singer
- Frank Ocean, American singer-songwriter
- Little Mix, girl group
- Guillaume Long, Ecuadorian politician, former Foreign Minister, and academic
- Josie Long, comedian
- Hannah Lowe, writer
- Lowkey, rapper
- Audun Lysbakken, Norwegian politician and former Minister for Children and Equality
- M.I.A., rapper, singer-songwriter and activist
- Sophie Mackintosh, author
- Sabrina Mahfouz, poet, playwright, performer and writer
- Firoze Manji, Kenyan author, activist and editor-in-chief
- Michael Mansfield, barrister
- Miriam Margolyes, actress
- Grantley Evan Marshall (aka Daddy G), musician and founding member of Massive Attack
- Francesca Martinez, actor and comedian
- Massive Attack, trip hop band
- Marisa Matias, Portuguese sociologist
- Mariana Mazzucato, economist
- Jon McClure (aka The Reverend), musician
- Jon McGregor, writer
- Bill McKibben, American environmentalist and writer
- Susana Medina, writer
- Luka Mesec, Slovenian politician
- Micachu, singer, songwriter and composer
- James Miller, novelist and academic
- Anna Minton, journalist and writer
- Maurice Mitchell, American activist and musician
- George Monbiot, writer and political activist (also endorsed the Green Party)
- Juan Carlos Monedero, Spanish politician
- Alan Moore, writer
- Mick Moore, political economist
- Thurston Moore, American musician and member of Sonic Youth
- Alan Morrison, poet
- Graham Mort, poet
- Bjørnar Moxnes, Norwegian politician
- John Muckle, writer
- Neel Mukherjee, writer
- Hugh Mulholland, curator
- Richard Murphy, political economist
- Karma Nabulsi, academic
- Sara Nelson, American flight attendant and union leader
- Andy Nicholson (formerly of Arctic Monkeys), musician, DJ, record producer and photographer
- Alex Niven, writer
- Peter Oborne, journalist
- Leo Panitch, Canadian writer
- Ian Parks, writer
- Maxine Peake, actor
- Avinash Persaud, economist
- Alex Pheby, author and academic
- Heather Phillipson, artist
- Tom Pickard, poet and filmmaker
- Kate Pickett, epidemiologist
- Thomas Piketty, French economist
- Joanna Piotrowska, Polish photographer
- David Pollard, writer
- Jocelyn Pook, composer, pianist, viola player
- Chris Power, short story writer and literary critic
- John Power, singer, songwriter and rhythm guitarist
- Agata Pyzik, Polish journalist and cultural critic
- Carlos Ramirez-Rosa, American politician, member of Chicago City Council
- Kate Raworth, economist
- Bernd Riexinger, German politician and trade union organiser
- Keith Ridgway, Irish novelist
- Robin Rimbaud, electronic musician
- Charlotte Ritchie, actor
- Rossana Rodriguez-Sanchez, American politician, member of Chicago City Council
- Dani Rodrik, Turkish economist
- Sally Rooney, Irish author
- Nadia Rose, rapper
- Michael Rosen, children's author
- Leone Ross, writer
- Lee Rourke, writer
- Anne Rouse, American-British poet
- Dilma Rousseff, former President of Brazil
- Dave Rowntree, musician
- Martin Rowson, cartoonist
- Mark Ruffalo, American actor
- Mark Rylance, actor and playwright
- Emmanuel Saez, French-American economist
- Logan Sama, grime DJ
- Emeli Sandé, singer-songwriter
- Ash Sarkar, journalist and political activist
- John Sauven, CEO of Greenpeace
- Alexei Sayle, comedian
- Vivien Schmidt, American political economist
- Erica Scourti, artist
- Lynne Segal, academic and activist
- Nadine Shah, singer and songwriter
- Tai Shani, artist
- Jesse Sharkey, American trade unionist and teacher
- Prem Sikka, accountant
- Shura, singer, songwriter and record producer
- Robert Skidelsky, economic historian
- Sleaford Mods, electronic punk music duo
- Catherine Slessor, architecture critic
- Charlie Sloth, DJ, producer and television presenter
- Gillian Slovo, South African writer
- Robyn Slovo, film producer
- John Smith, filmmaker
- Ahdaf Soueif, Egyptian novelist
- Neville Southall, footballer
- Christiana Spens, writer, academic and artist
- Amia Srinivasan, academic philosopher
- Larry Stabbins, musician
- Guy Standing, economist
- Bob Stanley, musician
- Frances Stewart, economist
- Stormzy, rapper and singer-songwriter
- Jonas Sjöstedt, Swedish politician
- David Stubbs, journalist
- Bhaskar Sunkara, American writer and founder of Jacobin
- Joelle Taylor, poet, playwright and author
- Kae Tempest, spoken-word performer
- Jade Thirlwall, singer in girlgroup Little Mix
- Jess Thom, artist and comedian
- Mark Thomas, comedian and activist
- Nicola Thorp, actor
- Jeremy Till, architect, educator and writer
- Angela Topping, poet
- Daniel Trilling, journalist, editor and author
- Miguel Urbán, Spanish politician
- Steven Van Zandt, American musician and activist
- Yanis Varoufakis, Greek economist and politician
- Idoia Villanueva, Spanish politician
- Nikolaj Villumsen, Danish politician
- Marina Vishmidt, American writer, editor and critic
- Oliver Wainwright, architecture and design critic
- Stewart Wallis, economist
- Joanna Walsh, author and critic
- Ashley Walters, rapper, musician and actor
- Jo Walton, Welsh-Canadian writer
- Martyn Ware, musician and composer
- Roger Waters, musician and member of Pink Floyd
- John Weeks, American economist
- Vivienne Westwood, fashion designer and businesswoman
- Wiley, musician
- Richard G. Wilkinson, epidemiologist
- Eley Williams, author
- Wolf Alice, band
- Jason Wood, writer
- Simon Wren-Lewis, economist
- Gary Younge, journalist, author and broadcaster
- Benjamin Zephaniah, poet and author
- Mandla Mandela, South African anti-apartheid activist, grandson of Nelson Mandela
- Gabriel Zucman, French economist

==== Liberal Democrats ====
- Mohammed Amin, businessman and former chairman of the Conservative Muslim Forum
- Frances Barber, actor
- Nick Boles, former Conservative and independent MP
- Alex Chesterman, entrepreneur and founder of Lovefilm, Zoopla and Cazoo
- Richard Dawkins, ethologist, evolutionary biologist, and author (also endorsed the SNP, Plaid Cymru, and Greens)
- Julian Dunkerton, businessman and co-founder of clothing retailer Superdry
- Greg Dyke, former Director-General of the BBC
- David Gauke, former Conservative and Independent MP
- Tanya Gold, journalist
- Michael Heseltine, former Conservative MP and deputy prime minister (endorsed independents in some constituencies)
- David Hirsh, sociologist and activist (endorsed Change UK in some constituencies)
- Dom Joly, comedian and columnist
- Emma Kennedy, actress, writer and presenter (not in all constituencies)
- Ewan Kirk, entrepreneur and founder and CIO of Cantab Capital Partners
- Eddie Marsan, actor
- Chris Martin, lead singer of Coldplay
- Deborah Meaden, businesswoman and Dragons' Den dragon
- Alan C. Parker businessman, chairman of Mothercare, and former CEO of Whitbread
- Matthew Parris, former Conservative MP and journalist
- Michael Rake, businessman and former President of the CBI
- Rachel Riley, television presenter and mathematician
- Tim Sainsbury, former Conservative MP and businessman
- Dan Snow, historian and television presenter
- John Tusa, arts administrator and journalist
- Vivian Wineman, former president of the Board of Deputies of British Jews

==== Plaid Cymru ====
- Richard Dawkins, ethologist, evolutionary biologist, and author (also endorsed the Liberal Democrats, SNP, and Greens)

==== Scottish National Party ====
- Richard Dawkins, ethologist, evolutionary biologist, and author (also endorsed the Liberal Democrats, Plaid Cymru, and Greens)
- Bendor Grosvenor, art historian, writer and former art dealer
- Suzanne Moore, journalist

=== Organisations ===
==== Conservative Party ====
- Bruges Group
- Leave.EU (also endorsed the DUP, UUP, Brexit Party and Independent candidates in some constituencies)
- Overseas Friends of the Bharatiya Janata Party (not in all seats)
- Young Christian Democrats (Sweden)

==== Democratic Unionist Party ====
- Leave.EU

==== Labour Party ====
Trades unions

- Associated Society of Locomotive Engineers and Firemen
- Bakers, Food and Allied Workers' Union
- Communication Workers Union
- Fire Brigades Union
- GMB
- Public and Commercial Services Union
- Transport Salaried Staffs' Association
- Union of Shop, Distributive and Allied Workers
- Unite the Union

Other

- Alliance for Workers' Liberty
- Boiler Room
- Democracy in Europe Movement 2025
- Democratic Socialists of America
- Jammu Kashmir Liberation Front
- Jewish Socialists' Group
- Lewica Razem
- Muslim Public Affairs Committee UK
- Pluto Press
- Socialist Resistance
- Young Communist League
- The People for Bernie Sanders

=== Parties ===
==== Parties not contesting these elections ====
Some parties are not contesting these elections and have endorsed other parties.

For Labour:

- Communist Party of Britain
- Left Unity
- New Communist Party of Britain
- Socialist Party
- Socialist Party (Ireland)
- Socialist Party Scotland
- Socialist Workers Party
- Workers Revolutionary Party

==== Parties only contesting some constituencies ====
Some parties which only contest elections in certain parts of the United Kingdom endorsed political parties in areas they do not contest.

- The Liberal Democrats endorsed the Alliance Party in Northern Ireland.
- The National Health Action Party (NHA) endorsed voting against the Conservatives.
- The UK Independence Party (UKIP) endorsed the Conservative Party in constituencies which they were not contesting.

== Endorsements in individual constituencies ==
=== A ===
==== Aberavon ====
For Stephen Kinnock (Labour):

- More United

==== Aberconwy ====
For Emily Owen (Labour):

- Compass
- People's Vote

==== Aberdeen South ====
For Stephen Flynn (SNP):

- Our Future Our Choice

==== Altrincham and Sale West ====
For Andrew Western (Labour):

- Sacha Lord, entrepreneur

==== Alyn and Deeside ====
For Mark Tami (Labour):

- People's Vote

==== Angus ====
For Dave Doogan (SNP):

- Our Future Our Choice

==== Arfon ====
For Hywel Williams (PC):

- Green Party of England and Wales
- Liberal Democrats
- More United
- Renew Party

==== Argyll and Bute ====
For Brendan O'Hara (SNP):

- Robert Florence, presenter and comedian

==== Arundel and South Downs ====
For Bella Sankey (Labour):

- James Nesbitt, actor

==== Ashfield ====
For Natalie Fleet (Labour):

- More United
- People's Vote

=== B ===
==== Banbury ====
For Suzette Watson (Labour):

- Alastair Campbell, journalist, broadcaster, author and former Labour political aide

==== Banff and Buchan ====
For Paul Robertson (SNP):

- Our Future Our Choice

==== Barrow and Furness ====
For Chris Altree (Labour):

- Compass
- For our Future's Sake
- People's Vote

For Simon Fell (Conservative):

- John Woodcock, former Labour and Independent MP for Barrow and Furness

==== Barnsley Central ====
For Victoria Felton (Brexit Party):

- Leave.EU

==== Bassetlaw ====
For Keir Morrison (Labour):

- People's Vote

==== Bath ====
For Wera Hobhouse (Lib Dem):

- Green Party of England and Wales
- More United
- Renew Party

==== Battersea ====
For Marsha de Cordova (Labour):

- Compass
- More United (also endorsed Mark Gitsham in the same constituency)
- Our Future Our Choice
- People's Vote
- Paapa Essiedu, actor

For Mark Gitsham (Lib Dem):

- More United (also endorsed Marsha de Cordova in the same constituency)

==== Beaconsfield ====
For Dominic Grieve (independent):

- Liberal Democrats
- People's Vote
- Steve Brookstein, singer
- John Finnemore, actor and comedy writer
- David Gauke, former Conservative MP
- Hugh Grant, actor and film producer
- David Allen Green, lawyer and legal journalist
- Michael Heseltine, former Conservative MP and deputy prime minister
- John Major, former Conservative prime minister
- Chris Patten, former Conservative MP and Chairman of the Conservative Party
- Jenni Russell, journalist and broadcaster
- Ian Taylor, former Conservative MP
- Jon Worth, political commentator, campaigner and lecturer

==== Bedford ====
For Mohammed Yasin (Labour):

- Compass
- People's Vote

For Henry Vann (Lib Dem)

- Independent hospital campaigner and founder of the 'Save Bedford Hospital Party', Dr. Barry Monk

==== Belfast East ====
For Naomi Long (Alliance):

- People's Vote
- Sinn Féin
- Social Democratic and Labour Party
- Green Party in Northern Ireland

For Gavin Robinson (DUP):

- Jamie Bryson, political activist

==== Belfast North ====
For Nigel Dodds (DUP):

- Ulster Unionist Party
- Traditional Unionist Voice
- Jamie Bryson, political activist

For John Finucane (Sinn Féin):

- Social Democratic and Labour Party
- Green Party in Northern Ireland

==== Belfast South ====
For Claire Hanna (SDLP):

- People's Vote
- Sinn Féin
- Green Party in Northern Ireland
- Our Future Our Choice

For Emma Little-Pengelly (DUP):

- Jamie Bryson, political activist

==== Bermondsey and Old Southwark ====
For Neil Coyle (Labour):

- Jo Maugham, barrister

For Humaira Ali (Lib Dem):

- Green Party of England and Wales
- More United
- Renew Party

==== Birkenhead ====
For Frank Field (Birkenhead Social Justice Party):

- Leave.EU

==== Birmingham Edgbaston ====
For Preet Gill (Labour):

- More United
- Our Future Our Choice

==== Birmingham Erdington ====
For Jack Dromey (Labour):

- More United

==== Birmingham Northfield ====
For Richard Burden (Labour):

- Compass
- More United

==== Birmingham Yardley ====
For Jess Phillips (Labour):

- More United
- Emily Benn, research assistant and former Labour politician
- Ingrid Oliver, actor and comedian

==== Bishop Auckland ====
For Helen Goodman (Labour):

- Compass
- More United
- Our Future Our Choice
- People's Vote

For Dehenna Davison (Conservative):

- Leave.EU
- Kate Hoey, former Labour MP and co-founder of Grassroots Out

==== Blackley and Broughton ====
For Graham Stringer (Labour):

- Kate Hoey, former Labour MP and co-founder of Grassroots Out

==== Bolsover ====
For Dennis Skinner (Labour):

- People's Vote

==== Bolton North East ====
For David Crausby (Labour):

- Compass
- People's Vote

==== Bolton West ====
For Julie Hilling (Labour):

- Compass

==== Bournemouth West ====
For Conor Burns (Conservative):

- Kate Hoey, former Labour MP and co-founder of Grassroots Out

==== Braintree ====
For Jo Beavis (Independent):

- Green Party of England and Wales

==== Brecon and Radnorshire ====
For Jane Dodds (Lib Dem):

- Compass
- Green Party of England and Wales
- More United
- People's Vote
- Plaid Cymru
- Renew Party

==== Brentford and Isleworth ====
For Ruth Cadbury (Labour):

- More United

==== Bridgend ====
For Madeleine Moon (Labour):

- People's Vote

==== Brighton Kemptown ====
For Lloyd Russell-Moyle (Labour);

- Guy Pratt, musician, comedian and actor
- Simon Price, music critic

==== Brighton Pavilion ====
For Caroline Lucas (Green):

- Compass
- Liberal Democrats
- More United
- Renew Party
- Heather Peace, singer-songwriter and actress
- Catherine Russell, actress

==== Bristol North West ====
For Darren Jones (Labour):

- More United
- Our Future Our Choice
- People's Vote
- Emily Benn, research assistant and former Labour politician
- Ross Kemp, actor, author and journalist

==== Bristol West ====
For Carla Denyer (Green):

- Margaret Cabourn-Smith, comedy actress
- Liberal Democrats
- Renew Party

==== Broxbourne ====
For Julia Bird (Lib Dem)

- Andrew Sentance, economist

==== Broxtowe ====
For Anna Soubry (Change UK):

- Liberal Democrats
- Ken Clarke, former Conservative MP and Chancellor of the Exchequer
- David Hirsh, sociologist
- Martyn Poliakoff, chemist
- Jenni Russell, journalist and broadcaster

==== Buckingham ====
For Stephen Dorrell (Lib Dem):

- Green Party of England and Wales
- Renew Party

==== Burnley ====
For Julie Cooper (Labour):

- People's Vote

==== Bury North ====
For James Frith (Labour):

- People's Vote

==== Bury South ====
For Lucy Burke (Labour):

- People's Vote

For Christian Wakeford (Conservative):

- Ivan Lewis, independent candidate, and former Labour and independent MP for the seat

==== Bury St Edmunds ====
For Helen Geake (Green):

- Liberal Democrats
- Renew Party

=== C ===
==== Caerphilly ====
For Lindsay Whittle (PC):

- Green Party of England and Wales
- Liberal Democrats
- Renew Party

==== Caithness, Sutherland and Easter Ross ====
For Jamie Stone (Lib Dem):

- More United

For Karl Rosie (SNP):

- Edwyn Collins, musician

==== Calder Valley ====
For Josh Fenton-Glynn (Labour):

- Compass
- Green Party of England and Wales

==== Camborne and Redruth ====
For Paul Farmer (Labour):

- People's Vote

==== Cambridge ====
For Rod Cantrill (Lib Dem):

- More United

For Daniel Zeichner (Labour):

- Mary Beard, classicist
- People's Vote

==== Cannock Chase ====
For Paul Woodhead (Green):

- Liberal Democrats
- Renew Party

==== Canterbury ====
For Rosie Duffield (Labour):

- Compass
- For our Future's Sake
- More United
- People's Vote
- Women's Equality Party
- Ayesha Hazarika, broadcaster, journalist and former adviser to the Labour Party
- Dave Prentis, trade unionist
- Angela Saini, science journalist, broadcaster and author
- Sandi Toksvig, writer, broadcaster and co-founder of the Women's Equality Party

==== Cardiff Central ====
For Bablin Molik (Lib Dem):

- Green Party of England and Wales
- Plaid Cymru
- Renew Party

==== Cardiff North ====
For Anna McMorrin (Labour):

- People's Vote

==== Cardiff South and Penarth ====
For Stephen Doughty (Labour Co-op):

- More United

==== Carmarthen East and Dinefwr ====
For Jonathan Edwards (PC):

- Compass
- Green Party of England and Wales
- Liberal Democrats
- Renew Party

==== Carshalton and Wallington ====
For Tom Brake (Lib Dem):

- Compass
- More United
- People's Vote

==== Central Ayrshire ====
For Philippa Whitford (SNP):

- More United
- Eddi Reader, singer-songwriter

==== Ceredigion ====
For Ben Lake (PC):

- More United (also endorsed Mark Williams in the same constituency)

For Mark Williams (Lib Dem):

- More United (also endorsed Ben Lake in the same constituency)

==== Cheadle ====
For Tom Morrison (Lib Dem):

- Compass
- Green Party of England and Wales
- More United
- Our Future Our Choice
- People's Vote
- Renew Party

==== Chelmsford ====
For Marie Goldman (Lib Dem):

- Green Party of England and Wales
- People's Vote
- Renew Party

==== Chelsea and Fulham ====
For Nicola Horlick (Lib Dem):

- Green Party of England and Wales
- People's Vote
- Renew Party
- Hugh Grant, actor and film producer

==== Cheltenham ====
For Max Wilkinson (Lib Dem):

- Compass
- For our Future's Sake
- Green Party of England and Wales
- More United
- People's Vote
- Renew Party

==== Chingford and Woodford Green ====
For Faiza Shaheen (Labour):

- Compass
- Green Party of England and Wales
- Alastair Campbell, journalist, broadcaster, author and former Labour political aide
- Hugh Grant, actor and film producer
- Ayesha Hazarika, broadcaster, journalist and former adviser to the Labour Party
- Ewan Pearson, electronic music producer
- David Schneider, actor

==== Chippenham ====
For Helen Belcher (Lib Dem):

- Green Party of England and Wales
- Renew Party

==== Chipping Barnet ====
For Emma Whysall (Labour):

- Compass
- For our Future's Sake
- More United
- Our Future Our Choice
- People's Vote
- Alastair Campbell, journalist, broadcaster, author and former Labour political aide
- Fiona Millar, journalist and campaigner
- Paul Morrison, film director

For Theresa Villiers (Conservative):

- Ivan Lewis, former independent and Labour MP

==== Cities of London and Westminster ====
For Chuka Umunna (Lib Dem):

- More United
- People's Vote
- Renew Party
- Patience Wheatcroft, journalist and Conservative life peer
- Women's Equality Party
- Hugh Grant, actor and film producer

==== Clwyd South ====
For Susan Elan Jones (Labour):

- Compass
- More United
- People's Vote

==== Colchester ====
For Martin Goss (Lib Dem):

- Compass
- People's Vote

==== Colne Valley ====
For Thelma Walker (Labour):

- Compass
- People's Vote

==== Corby ====
For Beth Miller (Labour):

- More United

==== Crawley ====
For Peter Lamb (Labour):

- More United
- People's Vote
- Hugh Grant, actor and film producer

==== Crewe and Nantwich ====
For Laura Smith (Labour):

- Compass
- People's Vote

==== Croydon Central ====
For Sarah Jones (Labour):

- People's Vote

==== Cumbernauld and Kilsyth ====
For Stuart McDonald (SNP):

- More United

=== D ===
==== Dagenham and Rainham ====
For Jon Cruddas (Labour):

- Compass

==== Darlington ====
For Jenny Chapman (Labour):

- People's Vote
- Alastair Campbell, journalist, broadcaster, author and former Labour political aide

==== Delyn ====
For David Hanson (Labour):

- People's Vote

==== Derby North ====
For Tony Tinley (Labour):

- Compass
- People's Vote

==== Dewsbury ====
For Paula Sherriff (Labour):

- People's Vote

==== Doncaster North ====
For Ed Miliband (Labour):

- More United

==== Dover ====
For Charlotte Cornell (Labour):

- More United

==== Dudley North ====
For Melanie Dudley (Labour):

- Compass
- People's Vote

==== Dwyfor Meirionnyth ====
For Liz Saville Roberts (PC):

- Compass
- Green Party of England and Wales
- Liberal Democrats
- More United
- People's Vote
- Renew Party

==== Dulwich and West Norwood ====
For Jonathan Bartley (Green):

- Liberal Democrats

=== E ===
==== Ealing Central and Acton ====
For Rupa Huq (Labour):

- More United
- United Voices of the World
- Charlie Brooker, journalist, broadcaster and writer

==== Ealing Southall ====
For Virendra Sharma (Labour):

- Overseas Friends of the Bharatiya Janata Party

==== East Devon ====
For Claire Wright (Independent):

- Compass
- Unite to Remain
- Martin Bell, former independent MP
- Julie Girling, former independent and Conservative MEP
- Hugh Grant, actor and film producer

==== East Kilbride, Strathaven and Lesmahagow ====
For Lisa Cameron (SNP):

- More United

==== East Lothian ====
For Kenny MacAskill (SNP):

- Jackie McNamara Sr., footballer

For Martin Whitfield (Labour):

- More United

==== East Renfrewshire ====
For Paul Masterton (Conservative):

- More United

==== East Surrey ====
For Frances Rehal (Labour):

- Emmy the Great, singer-songwriter

==== Eastbourne ====
For Stephen Lloyd (Lib Dem):

- Compass
- More United
- Our Future Our Choice
- People's Vote

==== Eastleigh ====
For Lynda Murphy (Lib Dem):

- People's Vote

==== Eddisbury ====
For Antoinette Sandbach (Lib Dem):

- More United

==== Edinburgh South ====
For Ian Murray (Labour):

- More United

==== Edinburgh West ====
For Christine Jardine (Lib Dem):

- More United

==== Enfield Southgate ====
For Bambos Charalambous (Labour):

- People's Vote

==== Esher and Walton ====
For Monica Harding (Lib Dem):

- Compass
- Green Party of England and Wales
- More United
- Our Future Our Choice
- People's Vote
- Renew Party
- Mitch Benn, comedian, author and musician
- Alastair Campbell, journalist, broadcaster, author and former Labour political aide
- Tim Dunn and Charlotte Charles, parents of Harry Dunn
- Hugh Grant, actor and film producer
- David Allen Green, lawyer and legal journalist
- Ayesha Hazarika, broadcaster, journalist and former adviser to the Labour Party
- Will Hutton, political economist
- James Purefoy, actor
- David Schneider, actor
- Ian Taylor, former Conservative MP for the constituency
- Femi Oluwole, campaigner

==== Exeter ====
For Ben Bradshaw (Labour):

- More United
- Deborah Meaden, businesswoman

For Joe Levy (Green):

- Liberal Democrats
- Renew Party

=== F ===
==== Falkirk ====
For John McNally (SNP):

- Eric Joyce, former independent and Labour MP for the constituency

==== Feltham and Heston ====
For Seema Malhotra (Labour Co-op):

- More United

==== Fermanagh and South Tyrone ====
For Tom Elliott (UUP):

- Democratic Unionist Party
- Traditional Unionist Voice
- Leave.EU
- Kate Hoey, former Labour MP and co-founder of Grassroots Out

For Caroline Wheeler (Independent):

- Socialist Party (Ireland)

==== Filton and Bradley Stoke ====
For Mhairi Threlfall (Labour):

- Compass

==== Finchley and Golders Green ====
For Luciana Berger (Lib Dem):

- Green Party of England and Wales
- More United
- Our Future Our Choice
- People's Vote
- Renew Party
- Emily Benn, research assistant and former Labour politician
- Alastair Campbell, journalist, broadcaster, author and former Labour political aide
- Hugh Grant, actor and film producer
- Laura Janner-Klausner, Senior Rabbi to Reform Judaism
- Deborah Lipstadt, American historian
- Eddie Marsan, actor
- Fiona Millar, journalist and campaigner
- Paul Morrison, film director
- Simon Schama, historian

For Ross Houston (Labour):

- Danny Rich, rabbi and chief executive of Liberal Judaism

==== Forest of Dean ====
For Chris McFarling (Green):

- Liberal Democrats
- Renew Party

=== G ===
==== Gedling ====
For Vernon Coaker (Labour):

- People's Vote

==== Glasgow Central ====
For Alison Thewliss (SNP):

- More United

==== Glasgow East ====
For Kate Watson (Labour):

- More United

==== Glasgow North ====
For Patrick Grady (SNP):

- More United

==== Glasgow North East ====
For Paul Sweeney (Labour):

- Robert Florence, presenter and comedian

==== Glasgow South ====
For Johann Lamont (Labour):

- Stuart Campbell, video game journalist

For Stewart McDonald (SNP):

- More United

==== Glasgow South West ====
For Chris Stephens (SNP):

- More United
- Cat Boyd, political activist

==== Gloucester ====
For Fran Boait (Labour):

- Compass

==== Gordon ====
For Richard Thomson (SNP):

- Our Future Our Choice

==== Gower ====
For Tonia Antoniazzi (Labour):

- More United
- People's Vote
- Russell T Davies, screenwriter and television producer

==== Guildford ====
For Zöe Franklin (Lib Dem):

- Green Party of England and Wales
- Our Future Our Choice
- People's Vote
- Renew Party
- Ayesha Hazarika, broadcaster, journalist and former adviser to the Labour Party
- David Schneider, actor, writer and comedian

For Anne Milton (independent):

- More United
- David Gauke, former Conservative MP
- Michael Heseltine, former Conservative MP and deputy prime minister
- John Major, former Conservative prime minister
- Chris Patten, former Conservative MP and Chairman of the Conservative Party
- Jenni Russell, journalist and broadcaster
- Ian Taylor, former Conservative MP

=== H ===
==== Hammersmith ====
For Andy Slaughter (Labour) :

- More United
- Noga Levy-Rapoport, climate activist, public speaker, and organiser of the UK climate strikes

==== Hampstead and Kilburn ====
For Tulip Siddiq (Labour):

- More United

==== Harrogate and Knaresborough ====
For Judith Rogerson (Lib Dem):

- Green Party of England and Wales
- More United
- Renew Party
- Reece Dinsdale, actor and director

==== Harrow East ====
For Pamela Fitzpatrick (Labour):

- Compass

==== Harrow West ====
For Gareth Thomas (Labour Co-op):

- More United

==== Hartlepool ====
For Richard Tice (Brexit Party):

- Leave.EU
- Kate Hoey, former Labour MP and co-founder of Grassroots Out
- Tim Martin, businessman and chairman of Wetherspoons

==== Hastings and Rye ====
For Peter Chowney (Labour):

- Compass
- People's Vote

For Sally-Ann Hart (Conservative):

- Leave.EU

==== Hazel Grove ====
For Lisa Smart (Lib Dem):

- Green Party of England and Wales
- More United
- People's Vote
- Renew Party

==== Hendon ====
For David Pinto-Duschinsky (Labour):

- For our Future's Sake
- People's Vote

==== High Peak ====
For Ruth George (Labour):

- Compass
- People's Vote

==== Hitchin and Harpenden ====
For Sam Collins (Lib Dem):

- Green Party of England and Wales (Note: However, the local Green Party issued a statement saying that it was not advising people how to vote)
- People's Vote
- Renew Party

==== Holborn and St Pancras ====
For Keir Starmer (Labour):

- Ayesha Hazarika, broadcaster, journalist and former adviser to the Labour Party
- Deborah Meaden, businesswoman

==== Hornsey and Wood Green ====
For Catherine West (Labour):

- More United

==== Houghton and Sunderland South ====
For Bridget Phillipson (Labour):

- Alastair Campbell, journalist, broadcaster, author and former Labour political aide

==== Hove ====
For Peter Kyle (Labour):

- More United

=== I ===
==== Ilford North ====
For Wes Streeting (Labour):

- More United
- Ayesha Hazarika, broadcaster, journalist and former adviser to the Labour Party

==== Ilford South ====
For Mike Gapes (Change UK):

- David Hirsh, sociologist

==== Inverclyde ====
For Martin McCluskey (Labour):

- More United

For Ronnie Cowan (SNP):

- Martin Compston, actor

==== Ipswich ====
For Sandy Martin (Labour):

- Compass
- People's Vote

==== Isle of Wight ====
For Vix Lowthion (Green):

- Compass
- Liberal Democrats
- Renew Party

=== K ===
==== Keighley ====
For John Grogan (Labour):

- Compass
- More United
- People's Vote
- Alastair Campbell, journalist, broadcaster, author and former Labour political aide

==== Kensington ====
For Emma Dent Coad (Labour):

- Beatie Edney, actress
- Peter Jukes, writer
- Noga Levy-Rapoport, climate activist, public speaker, and organiser of the UK climate strikes

For Sam Gyimah (Lib Dem):

- More United
- People's Vote
- Hugo Dixon, business journalist
- Tom Hollander, actor
- Jenni Russell, journalist and broadcaster

==== Kingston upon Hull East ====
For Karl Turner (Labour):

- Ricky Tomlinson, actor

==== Kirkcaldy and Cowdenbeath ====
For Neale Hanvey (withdrawn by SNP):

- Stuart Campbell, video game journalist

=== L ===
==== Lanark and Hamilton East ====
For Andrew Hilland (Labour):

- More United

==== Lancaster and Fleetwood ====
For Cat Smith (Labour):

- Harold Elletson, former Conservative MP, former Northern Party candidate in the constituency in 2015
- People's Vote

==== Leeds Central ====
For Hilary Benn (Labour):

- Emily Benn, research assistant, former Labour politician

==== Leeds North West ====
For Kamran Hussain (Lib Dem):

- More United (also endorsed Alex Sobel in the same constituency)

For Alex Sobel (Labour Co-op):

- Jewish Labour Movement
- More United (also endorsed Kamran Hussain in the same constituency)

==== Leicester West ====
For Liz Kendall (Labour):

- More United

==== Lewes ====
For Oli Henman (Lib Dem):

- Compass
- Our Future Our Choice
- More United
- People's Vote
- Steve Coogan, actor and comedian
- Will Hutton, political economist

==== Lincoln ====
For Karen Lee (Labour):

- Compass
- People's Vote

==== Linlithgow and East Falkirk ====
For Martyn Day (SNP):

- More United

==== Llanelli ====
For Mari Arthur (PC):

- Green Party of England and Wales
- Liberal Democrats
- Renew Party

==== Luton South ====
For Gavin Shuker (independent):

- Liberal Democrats
- More United

=== M ===
==== Macclesfield ====
For Neil Puttick (Labour):

- More United

==== Milton Keynes South ====
For Hannah O'Neil (Labour):

- Our Future Our Choice
- People's Vote

==== Milton Keynes North ====
For Charlynne Pullen (Labour):

- Compass
- People's Vote

==== Montgomeryshire ====
For Kishan Devani (Lib Dem):

- Green Party of England and Wales
- More United
- Plaid Cymru

==== Moray ====
For Laura Mitchell (SNP):

- Our Future Our Choice

==== Morley and Outwood ====
For Deanne Ferguson (Labour):

- Tim Roache, trade unionist

For Andrea Jenkyns (Conservative):

- Leave.EU

=== N ===
==== Newcastle-under-Lyme ====
For Carl Greatbatch (Labour):

- Compass
- People's Vote

==== Newcastle upon Tyne North ====
For Catherine McKinnell (Labour):

- More United

==== Newport West ====
For Ruth Jones (Labour):

- People's Vote

==== Newton Abbot ====
For Martin Wrigley (Lib Dem):

- People's Vote

==== Normanton, Pontefract and Castleford ====
For Andrew Lee (Conservative):

- Robert Rowland, Brexit Party MEP

==== North Ayrshire and Arran ====
For Patricia Gibson (SNP):

- More United

==== North Cornwall ====
For Danny Chambers (Lib Dem):

- Green Party of England and Wales
- People's Vote
- Renew Party

==== North Devon ====
For Alex White (Lib Dem):

- More United
- People's Vote

==== North Down ====
For Alex Easton (DUP):

- Jamie Bryson, political activist

For Stephen Farry (Alliance):

- People's Vote

===== North East Derbyshire =====
For Lee Rowley (Conservative)

- Steve Perez, entrepreneur and rally driver

==== North East Fife ====
For Wendy Chamberlain (Lib Dem):

- More United (also endorsed Stephen Gethins in the same constituency)

For Stephen Gethins (SNP):

- More United (also endorsed Wendy Chamberlain in the same constituency)
- Steve Murdoch, academic

==== North East Somerset ====
For Mark Huband (Labour):

- Jim Rossignol, computer games journalist and critic
- Siobhan Thompson, comedian

==== North Norfolk ====
For Karen Ward (Lib Dem):

- Compass
- Green Party of England and Wales
- More United
- People's Vote
- Renew Party

==== Norwich North ====
For Karen Davis (Labour):

- Compass

==== Norwich South ====
For Clive Lewis (Labour):

- Dave Rowntree, drummer in Blur

==== Nottingham South ====
For Lilian Greenwood (Labour):

- More United

=== O ===
==== Ochil and South Perthshire ====
For John Nicolson (SNP):

- Our Future Our Choice

==== Ogmore ====
For Chris Elmore (Labour):

- More United

==== Orkney and Shetland ====
For Alistair Carmichael (Lib Dem):

- More United

==== Oxford West and Abingdon ====
For Layla Moran (Lib Dem):

- Compass
- Green Party of England and Wales
- More United
- People's Vote
- Renew Party
- Trisha Greenhalgh, professor of primary health care
- Chris Lintott, astrophysicist
- Philip Pullman, author

=== P ===
==== Paisley and Renfrewshire North ====
For Gavin Newlands (SNP):

- More United (also endorsed Alison Taylor in the same constituency)

For Alison Taylor (Labour):

- More United (also endorsed Gavin Newlands in the same constituency)

==== Pendle ====
For Azhar Ali (Labour):

- People's Vote

==== Penistone and Stocksbridge ====
For Francyne Johnson (Labour):

- Compass
- People's Vote

For Hannah Kitching (Lib Dem):

- Green Party of England and Wales
- Renew Party

==== Peterborough ====
For Lisa Forbes (Labour):

- Compass
- People's Vote

==== Plymouth Moor View ====
For Charlotte Holloway (Labour):

- More United

==== Plymouth Sutton and Devonport ====
For Luke Pollard (Labour):

- People's Vote

==== Pontypridd ====
For Fflur Elin (PC):

- Green Party of England and Wales
- Liberal Democrats
- Renew Party

==== Portsmouth South ====
For Stephen Morgan (Labour):

- For our Future's Sake
- More United (also endorsed Gerald Vernon-Jackson in the same constituency)
- Our Future Our Choice
- Gordon Brown, former Labour Prime Minister and Chancellor
- Matthew Oakeshott, former Liberal Democrat peer, now a crossbench peer

For Gerald Vernon-Jackson (Lib Dem):

- Green Party of England and Wales
- More United (also endorsed Stephen Morgan in the same constituency)
- Renew Party

==== Pudsey ====
For Jane Aitchison (Labour):

- Compass
- People's Vote

==== Putney ====
For Fleur Anderson (Labour):

- More United (also endorsed Sue Wixley in the same constituency)
- Our Future Our Choice
- Alastair Campbell, journalist, broadcaster, author and former Labour political aide
- Ayesha Hazarika, broadcaster, journalist and former adviser to the Labour Party
- Emma Kennedy, actress, writer and presenter

For Sue Wixley (Lib Dem):

- More United (also endorsed Fleur Anderson in the same constituency)
- Jolyon Maugham, barrister

=== R ===
==== Reading East ====
For Matt Rodda (Labour):

- People's Vote

==== Reading West ====
For Rachel Eden (Labour):

- Compass
- More United
- People's Vote
- Hugh Grant, actor and film producer

==== Redcar ====
For Anna Turley (Labour):

- Alastair Campbell, journalist, broadcaster, author and former Labour political aide

==== Richmond Park ====
For Sarah Olney (Lib Dem):

- Compass
- Green Party of England and Wales
- Renew Party
- People's Vote
- Mitch Benn, comedian, author and musician
- Bamber Gascoigne, television presenter
- Will Hutton, political economist
- Kevin Maguire, journalist

==== Rhondda ====
For Chris Bryant (Labour):

- More United

==== Romsey and Southampton North ====
For Craig Fletcher (Lib Dem):

- Green Party of England and Wales
- Renew Party

==== Rossendale and Darwen ====
For Alyson Barnes (Labour):

- More United
- Alastair Campbell, journalist, broadcaster, author and former Labour political aide

==== Rother Valley ====
For Sophie Wilson (Labour):

- People's Vote

==== Rushcliffe ====
For Jason Billin (Lib Dem):

- Green Party of England and Wales
- More United (also endorsed Cheryl Pidgeon in the same constituency)
- Renew Party

For Cheryl Pidgeon (Labour):

- More United (also endorsed Jason Billin in the same constituency)

==== Rutherglen and Hamilton West ====
For Gerard Killen (Labour):

- More United

=== S ===
==== Scunthorpe ====
For Nic Dakin (Labour):

- More United
- People's Vote

==== Sedgefield ====
For Phil Wilson (Labour):

- More United
- People's Vote
- Alastair Campbell, journalist, broadcaster, author and former Labour political aide

==== Sheffield Central ====
For Paul Blomfield (Labour):

- More United

==== Sheffield Hallam ====
For Laura Gordon (Lib Dem):

- More United
- People's Vote
- Women's Equality Party

==== Sheffield Heeley ====
For Louise Haigh (Labour):

- Ayesha Hazarika, broadcaster, journalist and former adviser to the Labour Party

==== South Antrim ====
For Danny Kinahan (UUP):

- People's Vote

==== South Cambridgeshire ====
For Ian Sollom (Lib Dem):

- Green Party of England and Wales
- Our Future Our Choice
- People's Vote
- Renew Party

==== South East Cambridgeshire ====
For Pippa Heylings (Lib Dem):

- Green Party of England and Wales
- People's Vote
- Renew Party

==== South Shields ====
For Emma Lewell-Buck (Labour):

- Sheila Graber, animator and academic

==== South Swindon ====
For Sarah Church (Labour):

- Compass
- People's Vote

==== South West Hertfordshire ====
For David Gauke (independent):

- More United
- Emily Benn, research assistant and former Labour politician
- Alastair Campbell, journalist, broadcaster, author and former Labour political aide
- Kenneth Clarke, former Conservative and independent MP
- Sue Doughty, former Liberal Democrat MP
- John Finnemore, actor and comedy writer
- David Allen Green, lawyer and legal journalist
- Matthew Green, former Liberal Democrat MP
- Michael Heseltine, former Conservative MP and deputy prime minister
- John Major, former Conservative prime minister
- Gina Miller, business owner and activist
- Chris Patten, former Conservative MP and Chairman of the Conservative Party
- Amber Rudd, former Conservative and independent MP
- Jenni Russell, journalist and broadcaster
- Rory Stewart, former Conservative and independent MP
- Ian Taylor, former Conservative MP

For Gagan Mohindra (Conservative):

- Leave.EU

==== South West Surrey ====
For Paul Follows (Lib Dem):

- Compass
- Green Party of England and Wales
- Renew Party

==== Southampton Itchen ====
For Simon Letts (Labour):

- Compass
- For our Future's Sake

==== Southampton Test ====
For Alan Whitehead (Labour):

- More United

==== Southport ====
For John Wright (Lib Dem):

- Green Party of England and Wales
- More United
- People's Vote
- Renew Party

==== St Albans ====
For Daisy Cooper (Lib Dem):

- Compass
- For our Future's Sake
- More United
- People's Vote
- Will Hutton, political economist

==== St Ives ====
For Andrew George (Lib Dem):

- Compass
- More United
- Our Future Our Choice
- People's Vote
- Hugh Grant, actor and film producer

==== Stevenage ====
For Jill Borcherds (Labour):

- People's Vote

==== Stockport ====
For Wendy Meikle (Lib Dem):

- Ann Coffey, former Labour and Change UK MP

==== Stockton South ====
For Paul Williams (Labour):

- Compass
- More United
- People's Vote

==== Stoke-on-Trent Central ====
For Gareth Snell (Labour):

- People's Vote

==== Stoke-on-Trent North ====
For Ruth Smeeth (Labour):

- Compass
- Jewish Labour Movement
- People's Vote
- Steve Kemp, trade unionist
- Tim Roache, trade unionist

==== Streatham ====
For Helen Thompson (Lib Dem):

- Catherine Russell, actor

==== Stroud ====
For David Drew (Labour):

- Our Future Our Choice
- People's Vote
- Julie Girling, leader of the Renew Party and former Conservative and Independent MEP

For Molly Scott Cato (Green):

- Liberal Democrats
- Renew Party
- Rasmus Andresen, German Alliance 90/The Greens MEP
- Jolyon Maugham, barrister

==== Sunderland Central ====
For Julie Elliott (Labour):

- More United
- Alastair Campbell, journalist, broadcaster, author and former Labour political aide

==== Sutton and Cheam ====
For Hina Bokhari (Lib Dem):

- Compass
- More United

==== Swansea West ====
For Geraint Davies (Labour):

- More United

=== T ===
==== Taunton Deane ====
For Gideon Amos (Lib Dem):

- Green Party of England and Wales
- People's Vote
- Renew Party

==== Telford ====
For Katrina Gilman (Labour):

- Compass

==== The Cotswolds ====
For Alan MacKenzie (Labour):

- Paul Cornell, writer

For Liz Webster (Lib Dem):

- Julie Girling, former independent and Conservative MEP

==== Thornbury and Yate ====
For Claire Young (Lib Dem):

- Green Party of England and Wales
- People's Vote
- Renew Party

==== Tooting ====
For Rosena Allin-Khan (Labour):

- More United

==== Totnes ====
For Sarah Wollaston (Lib Dem):

- Green Party of England and Wales
- More United
- People's Vote
- Renew Party
- Alastair Campbell, journalist, broadcaster, author and former Labour political aide

==== Tottenham ====
For David Lammy (Labour):

- More United

==== Truro and Falmouth ====
For Jennifer Forbes (Labour):

- For our Future's Sake

For Ruth Gripper (Lib Dem):

- More United

==== Tunbridge Wells ====
For Ben Chapelard (Lib Dem):

- Green Party of England and Wales
- Renew Party

==== Twickenham ====
For Munira Wilson (Lib Dem):

- Green Party of England and Wales
- More United
- Renew Party

=== U ===
==== Uxbridge and South Ruislip ====
For Ali Milani (Labour):

- Lord Buckethead, novelty candidate for the constituency
- Hugo Dixon, business journalist
- Mike Galsworthy, researcher and anti-Brexit activist
- Hugh Grant, actor and film producer
- Ayesha Hazarika, broadcaster, journalist and former adviser to the Labour Party
- Zamzam Ibrahim, president of the National Union of Students
- Francis Lee, actor, film director and screenwriter
- Noga Levy-Rapoport, climate activist, public speaker, and organiser of the UK climate strikes

=== V ===
==== Vale of Clwyd ====
For Chris Ruane (Labour):

- Compass
- People's Vote

==== Vale of Glamorgan ====
For Belinda Loveluck-Edwards (Labour):

- Compass

For Anthony Slaughter (Green):

- Liberal Democrats
- Plaid Cymru
- Renew Party

==== Vauxhall ====
For Florence Eshalomi (Labour):

- Mat Fraser, actor and writer
- Will Straw, policy researcher and politician

=== W ===
==== Wakefield ====
For Mary Creagh (Labour):

- Compass
- More United
- People's Vote
- Alastair Campbell, journalist, broadcaster, author and former Labour political aide

==== Walsall South ====
For Gurjit Bains (Conservative):

- Amir Khan, boxer

==== Wantage ====
For Richard Benwell (Lib Dem):

- Green Party of England and Wales
- More United
- Renew Party

==== Warrington North ====
For Elizabeth Babade (Brexit Party):

- UKIP

==== Warrington South ====
For Ryan Bate (Lib Dem):

- Green Party of England and Wales
- Renew Party

For Faisal Rashid (Labour):

- People's Vote

For Andy Carter (Conservative):

- UKIP

==== Warwick and Leamington ====
For Louis Adam (Lib Dem):

- More United

For Matt Western (Labour):

- Compass
- People's Vote

==== Weaver Vale ====
For Mike Amesbury (Labour):

- People's Vote

==== Watford ====
For Chris Ostrowski (Labour):

- Compass
- For our Future's Sake
- More United (also endorsed Ian Stotesbury in the same constituency)

For Ian Stotesbury (Lib Dem):

- Green Party of England and Wales
- More United (also endorsed Chris Ostrowski in the same constituency)
- Renew Party

==== Wells ====
For Tessa Munt (Lib Dem):

- Green Party of England and Wales
- More United
- Our Future Our Choice
- People's Vote
- Renew Party

==== West Aberdeenshire and Kincardine ====
For Fergus Mutch (SNP):

- Our Future Our Choice

==== West Ham ====
For Sara Kumar (Conservative):

- Michail Antonio, footballer

==== Westminster North ====
For Karen Buck (Labour):

- More United

==== Westmorland and Lonsdale ====
For Tim Farron (Lib Dem):

- Compass
- Green Party of England and Wales
- People's Vote
- Renew Party

==== Wimbledon ====
For Stephen Hammond (Conservative):

- More United

For Paul Kohler (Lib Dem):

- Green Party of England and Wales
- Our Future Our Choice
- Renew Party
- People's Vote

==== Winchester ====
For Paula Ferguson (Lib Dem):

- Green Party of England and Wales
- More United
- Our Future Our Choice
- People's Vote
- Renew Party
- Alastair Campbell, journalist, broadcaster, author and former Labour political aide
- Will Hutton, political economist

==== Wirral South ====
For Alison McGovern (Labour):

- More United

==== Wirral West ====
For Margaret Greenwood (Labour):

- People's Vote

==== Witney ====
For Charlotte Hoagland (Lib Dem):

- Green Party of England and Wales
- Renew Party

==== Wokingham ====
For Phillip Lee (Lib Dem):

- Compass
- More United
- Our Future Our Choice
- People's Vote
- Alastair Campbell, journalist, broadcaster, author and former Labour political aide
- Kenneth Clarke, former Conservative and independent MP
- Michael Heseltine, former Conservative MP and deputy prime minister
- Will Hutton, political economist
- Clive Tyldesley, sport commentator

For John Redwood (Conservative):

- Leave.EU

==== Wolverhampton North East ====
For Emma Reynolds (Labour):

- More United

==== Wolverhampton South East ====
For Pat McFadden (Labour):

- Alastair Campbell, journalist, broadcaster, author and former Labour political aide
- Ross Kemp, actor, author and journalist

==== Wolverhampton South West ====
For Eleanor Smith (Labour):

- People's Vote

==== Worcester ====
For Lynn Denham (Labour):

- More United

==== Workington ====
For Sue Hayman (Labour):

- Compass
- People's Vote

==== Wrexham ====
For Mary Wimbury (Labour):

- Compass
- People's Vote

=== Y ===
==== Ynys Môn ====
For Aled Dafydd (PC):

- Green Party of England and Wales
- Liberal Democrats
- More United
- People's Vote
- Renew Party

==== York Outer ====
For Keith Aspden (Lib Dem):

- Green Party of England and Wales
- Renew Party

== See also ==
- Newspaper endorsements in the 2010 United Kingdom general election
- 2010 United Kingdom general election (endorsements)
- Endorsements in the 2015 United Kingdom general election
- Endorsements in the 2017 United Kingdom general election
