= Keith Armstrong =

Keith Armstrong may refer to:

- Keith Armstrong (footballer) (born 1957), former footballer and football manager
- Keith Armstrong (author) (born 1946), North East England writer
- Keith Armstrong (American football) (born 1963), American football special teams coordinator
- Keith Armstrong (activist) (1950 – 2017), UK disability activist
