= David Pollard =

David Pollard may refer to:

- David Pollard (cricketer) (1835–1909), English cricketer
- David Pollard (author) (born 1942), British author
- David D. Pollard (born 1943), professor in geomechanics and structural geology
