= Opposition to Brexit =

Opposition to the UK's withdrawal from the EU

Since the United Kingdom's vote to leave the European Union in the 2016 referendum, a number of demonstrations have taken place and organisations formed whose goal has been to oppose, reverse or otherwise impede that decision.

== Marches ==
=== The March for Europe, July 2016 ===
The first March for Europe took place in London on 2 July 2016, shortly after the Brexit referendum on 23 June 2016, and was attended by thousands of people.

=== The March for Europe, September 2016 ===
The second March for Europe took place in London on 3 September 2016 and was attended by thousands of people. It was one of a number of events to take place on the day, including rallies in Edinburgh and Birmingham. Pro-Brexit demonstrators staged a counter-protest at one location along the marching route.

=== Unite for Europe, March 2017 ===
The Unite for Europe march, which coincided with the 60th anniversary of the signing of the Treaty of Rome, was held in London on 25 March 2017, and the Independent reported that police estimated 100,000 people attended.

=== People's March for Europe, September 2017 ===
The People's March Ltd came into being in July 2017, to help ensure that a march planned for 9 September 2017 in London went ahead. The event began with a march from Hyde Park and was followed by speeches in Parliament Square, emceed by British adventurer Graham Hughes. The event was attended by thousands of people and was part of a series of protests dubbed "the Autumn of discontent". Over 50,000 people took to the streets under the banner "Unite, Rethink, Reject Brexit" marching from Hyde Park to Parliament Square followed by a rally with speakers from the remain movement and from across the political spectrum and received broad media coverage.

=== StopBrexit Manchester, October 2017 ===
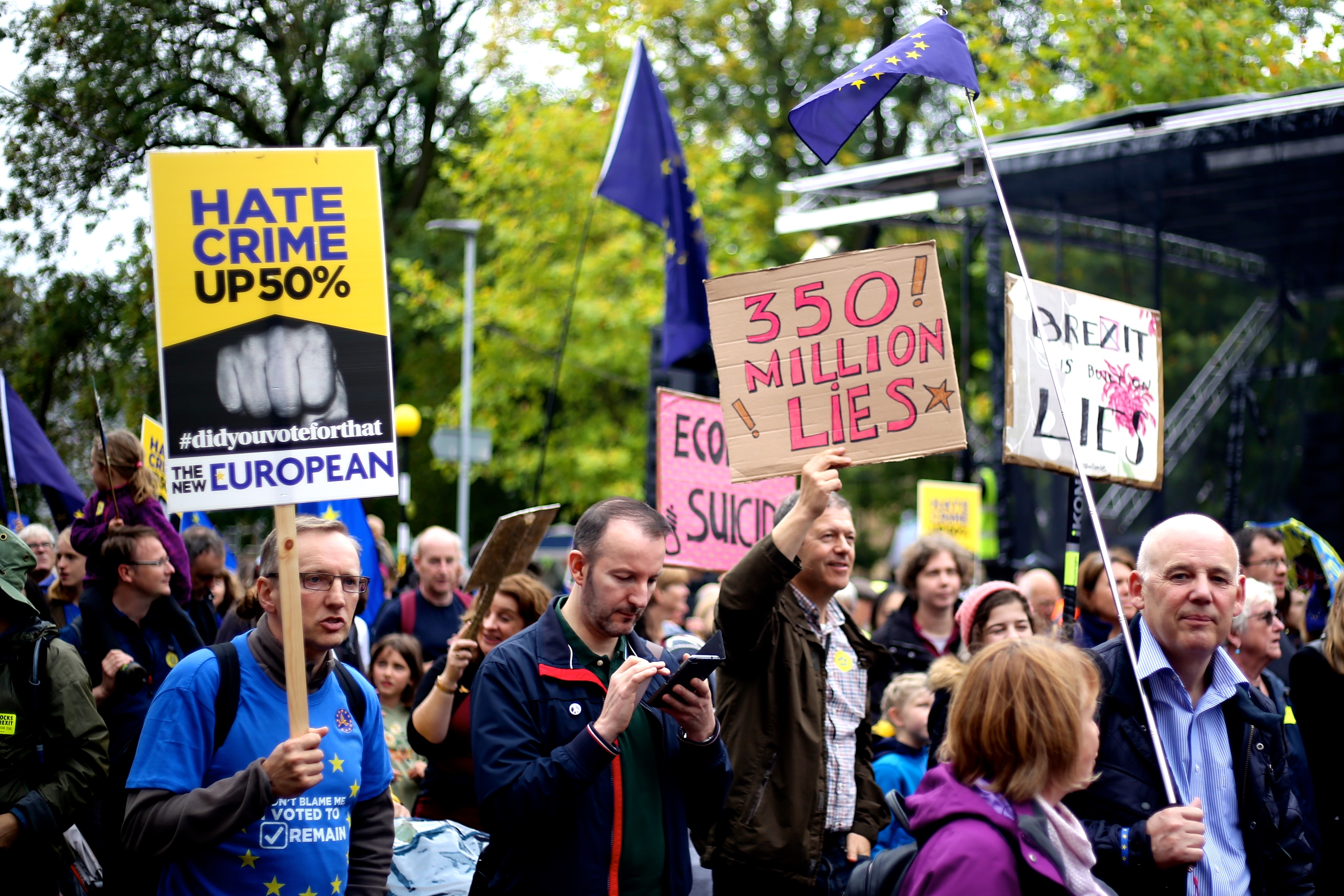
StopBrexit Manchester march in October 2017

The StopBrexit Manchester march was held in All Saints Park, Manchester, on 1 October 2017, to coincide with the Conservative Party conference. The event consisted of a rally followed by a march through central Manchester, and finishing with a street party organised by local pro-EU groups. An estimated 30,000 people took part in this event.

=== StopBrexit Leeds, March 2018 ===
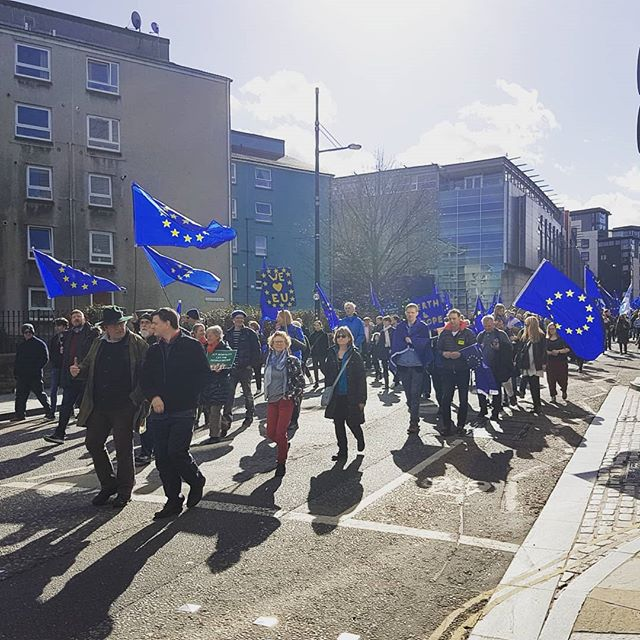
A pro-EU demonstration in Edinburgh, March 2018

The StopBrexit Leeds march was held on 24 March 2018 in Leeds. The march assembled at The Headrow in central Leeds and ended with a rally at The Headrow, with thousands of people reported to have attended. Leeds for Europe organised the march. There were also anti-brexit protests on the same day in various other cities across the country, including Edinburgh, Ipswich, Exeter and Newcastle.

=== People's Vote march, June 2018 ===
On 23 June 2018, the second anniversary of the EU referendum, People's Vote organised a march and protest from Trafalgar Square to Parliament Square in Central London. Speakers included Liberal Democrat leader Vince Cable, Green Party co-leader Caroline Lucas, Labour's David Lammy and the Conservatives' Anna Soubry. The organisers said that at least 100,000 people attended the march. A smaller pro-Brexit march was held in London on the same date.

The People's Vote march was not designed to reverse the result of the referendum, but to hold a public vote on the final terms of the UK's EU exit deal. The organisers said Brexit was "not a done deal" and Cable said "Brexit is not inevitable. Brexit can be stopped." The Labour leader Jeremy Corbyn was criticised for not attending the march.

=== "People's Vote" march, September 2018 ===
Thousands marched through Liverpool on 23 September 2018 during the annual Labour Party conference in protest against leaving the EU.

=== Bin Brexit in Brum, September 2018 ===
Another march against Brexit took place in Birmingham starting from Victoria Square on 30 September 2018 during the annual Conservative Party conference.

=== People's Vote March for the Future, October 2018 ===
On 20 October 2018, People's Vote organised the second march called The People's Vote March for the Future. Organisers claimed that 700,000 people attended the march jointly organised by People's Vote and the UK newspaper The Independent, although police were unable to verify the number. A later estimate, presented by the Greater London Authority and published in The Daily Telegraph, reported the number to be 250,000. The aim of the march was to secure a vote on the final Brexit deal. The march organisers stated: "Whether you voted leave or remain, nobody voted to make this country worse off, to harm jobs, to damage the NHS, to affect the future of millions of young people, or to make this country more divided. The more the shape of the final Brexit deal becomes clear, the more it is clear that it will do nothing to improve social justice, reduce inequality, increase our standard of living, or create a better future for future generations."

A number of celebrities, including Delia Smith, Ian McEwan, Sir Patrick Stewart and Charlie Mullins, stated that they would fund coach travel to London, to enable those wishing to attend the march to do so. If the organisers' stated estimate of the attendance was correct, then the event was the second-largest protest of the 21st century in the UK, after the "Stop the War" anti-Iraq War march in 2003.

=== Put It to the People, March 2019 ===
The third People's Vote march, also known as the Put It to the People march, took place in London on 23 March 2019. The main purpose of the march was to call for a second referendum. The organisers suggested that a million people took part; independent verification by experts in crowd estimation put the figure at between 312,000 and 400,000.

=== March for Change, July 2019 ===
Another anti-Brexit march took place in London on 20 July 2019, with the message “No to Boris, yes to Europe”.

=== Let Us Be Heard, October 2019 ===
The fourth People's Vote march, again in London and this time known as the Let Us Be Heard march, took place on 19 October 2019, thereby coinciding with the planned vote in the House of Commons on Boris Johnson's revised withdrawal agreement. Organisers estimated a million people attended the march, whose purpose was to demand a confirmatory referendum on the terms of withdrawal.

== Joint campaigning ==
Members of national groups, including Britain for Europe, European Movement UK, Open Britain, conduct joint campaigns in various towns and cities of the UK.

In March 2018 six national groups moved into a shared Remain office in Millbank Tower, London, in order to pool their resources for campaigning.

=== People's Vote ===
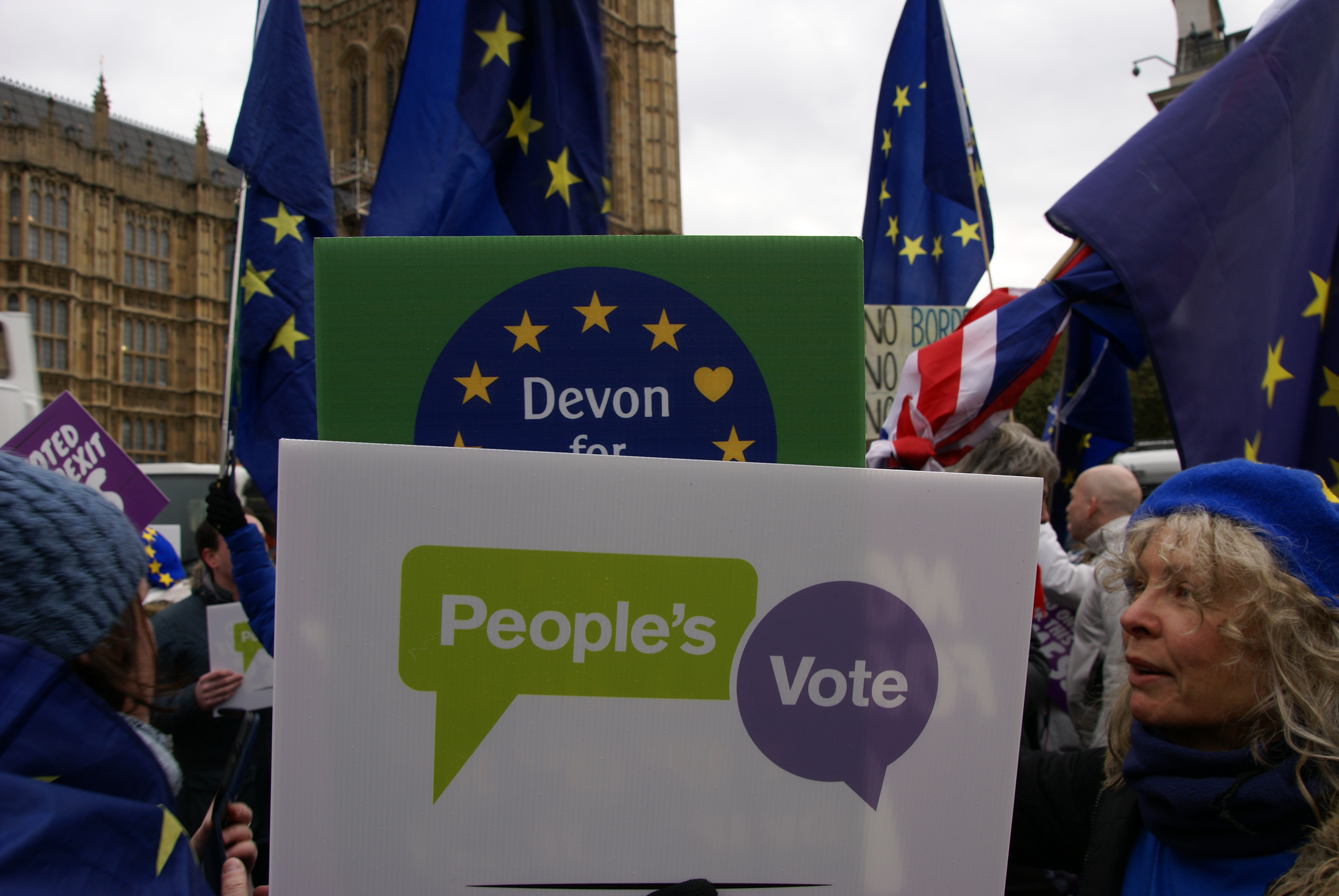
Protesters holding the logo of People's Vote in a demonstration

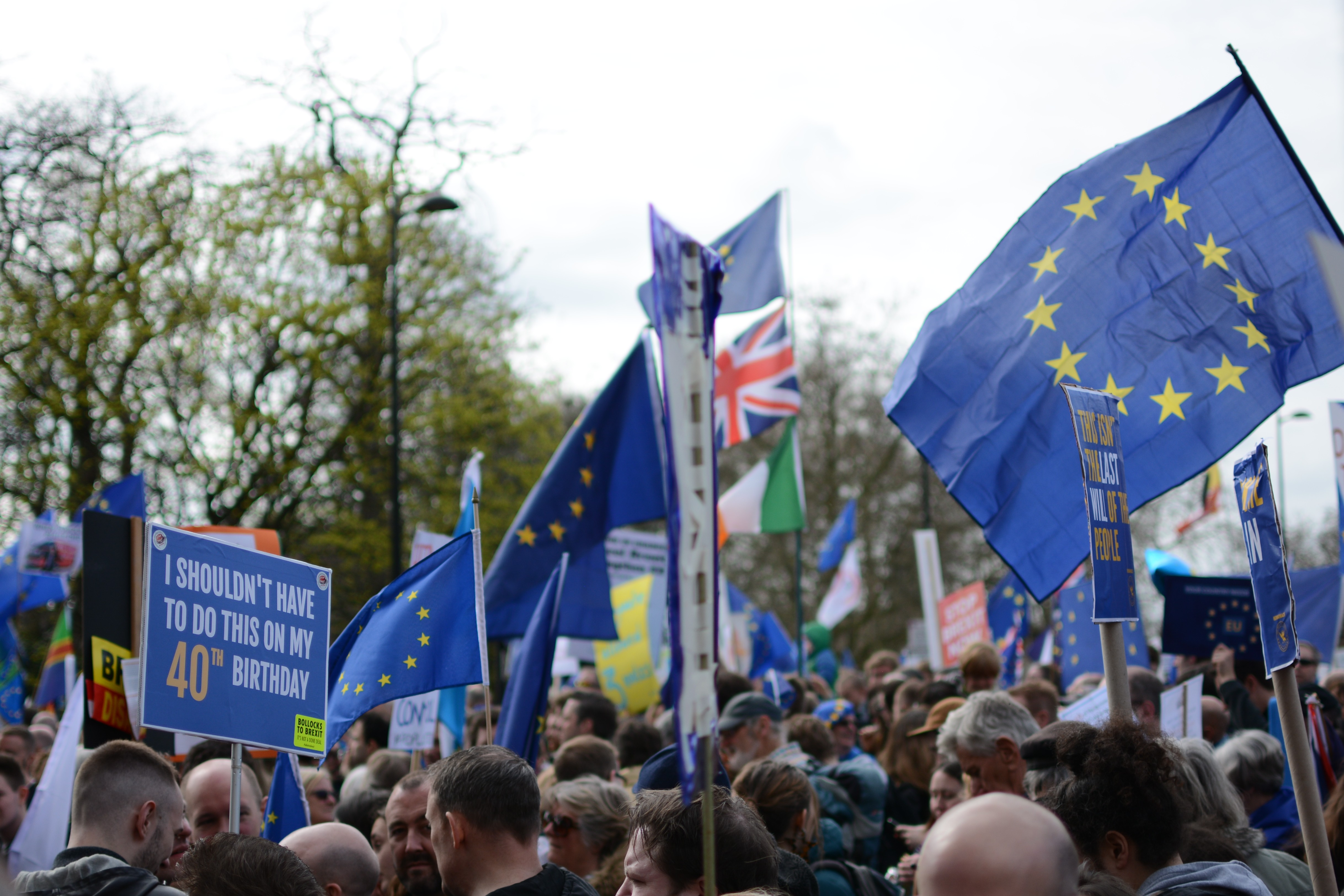
Crowds at the People's Vote March in London, March 2019

Launched in April 2018, People's Vote is a UK campaign group calling for a public vote on the final Brexit deal. The campaign comprises nine anti-Brexit groups, including eight operating from Millbank Tower. The groups include the seven listed below, plus For our Future's Sake (FFS), InFacts, and Open Britain.

==== Britain for Europe ====
Britain for Europe was established shortly after the EU referendum. It is an independent pressure group and umbrella organisation for grassroot activists from around the UK. It lobbies in favour of the UK remaining in the EU. The group organises marches, conferences, meetings, and national campaigns. It is a founding member of People's Vote.

The Chair of Britain for Europe is Tom Brufatto. Britain for Europe is organised from the grassroots membership.

The organisation has about sixty member affiliated groups including:

- Camden for Europe
- Devon for Europe
- Bath for Europe
- Berkshire for Europe
- Bristol for Europe
- EU in Brum
- Leeds for Europe
- Perth for Europe

In January 2017, the affiliate group Leeds for Europe formed. It campaigns against Brexit in the city of Leeds and elsewhere in West Yorkshire. Leeds for Europe is also affiliated to the European Movement UK.

==== European Movement UK ====
European Movement UK is an organisation which campaigns in support of greater European integration and for reform of the EU. It is part of the European Movement International, which pushes for a "democratic, federal, enlarged European Union".

Formed in 1949, it campaigned for Britain to remain in the EU in the 2016 referendum and continues to oppose Brexit in collaboration with other major pro-European campaign groups such as Open Britain and Britain for Europe.

==== Healthier IN the EU ====
Healthier IN the EU was co-founded in 2016 by Mike Galsworthy, Rob Davidson, and Martin McKee. Its advisory board included former Chief Executive of the NHS in England Nigel Crisp, former Minister for Health John Bowis, former Chief Medical Officer for Scotland Harry Burns, former President of the Royal College of Physicians Ian Gilmore, President of Royal College of Psychiatrists Simon Wessely, and the editor of The Lancet, Richard Horton. Healthier in the EU is a grassroots organization making the health case for continued EU membership.

Shortly before the 2017 general election, Healthier IN the EU and Vote Leave Watch organised an open letter calling on the Conservative Party to commit to spending an extra £350m per week on the NHS after Brexit. The letter was signed by some of the UK's leading medical professionals. The amount of £350m per week corresponded to the savings attributable to Brexit claimed by the Vote Leave campaign. Following the publication of the letter, foreign secretary Boris Johnson received negative press coverage for falsely claiming that the pledge was already in the Conservative Party election manifesto.

Healthier IN the EU is a founding member of People's Vote.

==== Wales for Europe ====
Wales for Europe is an independent organisation, but was a founding member of People's Vote through its partnership with Open Britain. The chair from 2016 to 2020 was Geraint Talfan Davies.

==== Our Future Our Choice ====
Our Future Our Choice (OFOC) was incorporated as a company on 19 February 2018 and is aimed towards young adults. Its four founding members are Femi Oluwole (spokesman), Calum Millbank-Murphy (spokesman), Lara Spirit (co-president) and Will Dry (co-president).

Our Future Our Choice is a founding member of People's Vote.

==== Scientists for EU ====
Scientists for EU is a pro-EU research advocacy group. It was co-founded by scientists Mike Galsworthy and Rob Davison on 8 May 2015, the day after the UK general election 2015. Its advisory board included high-profile UK scientists, including former EU chief scientific advisor Anne Glover, and MPs from different political parties. Galsworthy articulated two concerns that Scientists for EU aimed to address: "first, a lack of clarity and cohesion within the community on EU benefits and Brexit risks; and, secondly, a lack of public understanding on the UK/EU relationship in science."

Following the referendum, hundreds of scientists contacted Scientists for EU voicing concerns about the future of scientific research in the UK after Brexit, many saying they planned to leave the UK; for some, xenophobia was a significant concern. Programme Director Galsworthy concluded, "It is clear that the UK has overnight become less attractive as a place to do science."

Scientists for EU has continued to publicize the benefits of EU membership for Britain and the negative consequences of Brexit for science and healthcare, including uncertainty over immigration and funding, and the loss of influence over EU regulations and policy.

In February 2018 George Soros's Open Society Foundations donated £500,000 to a number of groups opposing Brexit including £35,000 to Scientists for EU.

Scientists for EU is a founding member of People's Vote.

== Other groups ==
=== Right to Vote ===
Right to Vote was a group of Conservative, Change UK and Independent MPs and Peers who advocate holding a referendum on the Brexit withdrawal agreement. It was founded after the UK government lost the first parliamentary vote on the UK's withdrawal agreement with the EU.

=== Wooferendum ===
Wooferendum was founded in August 2018 by Daniel Elkan. The group is concerned with the welfare of pets when the UK leaves the European Union. The protesters and their pets of Wooferendum also joined the People's Vote march.

== Other events ==
=== Viral petition to revoke Article 50 ===
In March 2019, an e-petition launched on the UK Parliament petitions website reached over 6 million signatures within a week, becoming the largest petition in UK history, and the fastest-growing. This surge in signatures has been attributed to a speech given by Theresa May which was perceived to accuse MPs of 'frustrating' Brexit. The petition was later referenced by Donald Tusk, the President of the European Council, who warned that the UK Government "cannot betray the six million people". The petition was debated in Parliament on 1 April 2019. The petition signatures reached 6,103,056 by 20 August, the closure date.

=== Postcards from the 48% ===
David Wilkinson's full-length film Postcards from the 48% opened on 23 June 2018 at the Edinburgh International Film Festival and went on general release on 6 July 2018. The documentary was made by, and featured, members of the 48% of voters who chose Remain in the referendum. A reviewer for The Times wrote that it "gives voice to the fears and the hopes of the nation's discontented remainers".

=== Last Night of the Proms ===
Anti-Brexit campaigners gave away EU flags to audience members at the last night of The Proms in 2016, 2017 and 2023.

=== No. 10 Vigil boat trips ===
The No. 10 Vigil campaign group, which holds regular demonstrations outside Downing Street, organised a boat trip on the Thames on 19 August 2017. A subsequent boat trip occurred on 24 July 2018.

== See also ==
- "Bollocks to Brexit"
- Opinion polling on the United Kingdom's membership of the European Union (2016–2020)
- Potential re-accession of the United Kingdom to the European Union
- Led By Donkeys, anti-Brexit activists using satire
- Steve Bray
