= Glossary of terms from the 2019 United Kingdom general election =

Terms from the 2019 elections in the UK

The 2019 United Kingdom general election of 12 December 2019 saw many new pieces of politics-related jargon enter popular use.

== Terms ==
Brelection
A portmanteau of Brexit and Election that was coined as an informal term for the 2019 election, since its outcome would determine the course of the Brexit process.
Brexit election
See Brelection for details.

Brexit Party
A new political party formed in early 2019 led by Nigel Farage in order to contest the 2019 European Parliament elections. The Brexit Party stood their candidates down in seats won by the Conservative Party in 2017, with a campaign focus on Labour leave seats in the North of England. The Brexit Party did not win any seats.

Corbynmania
First coined in 2015, Corbynmania is a term used to describe enthusiastic support for Jeremy Corbyn, who was leader of the Labour Party during the 2019 election.
Early Parliamentary General Election Act 2019
An Act of the Parliament of the United Kingdom that made legal provision for the holding of the 2019 election; the legislation was required under the Fixed-term Parliaments Act 2011.
"Get Brexit done"
A Conservative Party slogan urging people to vote for them in order to complete the Brexit process.
Labour's red wall
A term used to describe the Parliamentary constituencies in the Midlands and northern England that historically vote for Labour. The terms "red wall" and "Labour's red wall" came to prominence during the 2019 general election when many traditionally Labour supporting constituencies in these areas elected Conservative Members of Parliament for the first time. The election saw a landslide win for the Conservatives, and thus Labour's red wall was described by commentators as having crumbled.
Leave constituency
A constituency that voted to leave the European Union during the 2016 EU referendum.
Red wall
Remain constituency
A constituency that voted to remain in the European Union during the 2016 referendum.
Safe seat
A constituency which is regarded as fully secure, for either a certain political party, or the incumbent representative personally or a combination of both.

Target seat

A constituency which is regarded as fully secure, for either a certain political party, or the incumbent representative personally or a combination of both. A marginal seat that is a key target of attention from the political parties. It is these seats that will decide who wins and who loses the general elections. According to BBC News, a quarter of all seats had a majority of less than 10%. Target seats included; Southampton Itchen, North East Fife and Richmond Park.
Unite to Remain
A campaign and electoral pact during the 2019 election involving three parties that supported remaining in the European Union: the Liberal Democrats, the Green Party of England and Wales, and, in Wales, Plaid Cymru. Its stated goal was to avoid the spoiler effect and maximise the number of MPs elected who would oppose Brexit. The pact did not work, as the remain alliance suffered a net loss of 1 seat, and Liberal Democrat leader Jo Swinson lost her own seat.
Workington man
Named after the Cumbria town of Workington, the term "Workington man" was used to describe the stereotypical key target voter who could determine the election result. Workington, a Labour seat held by the Shadow Secretary of State for Environment, Food and Rural Affairs, Sue Hayman was taken by the Conservatives in the general election.

== See also ==
- Glossary of terms from the 2024 United Kingdom general election
