= Stephen Lambert (media executive) =

British media executive

Stephen Lambert OBE
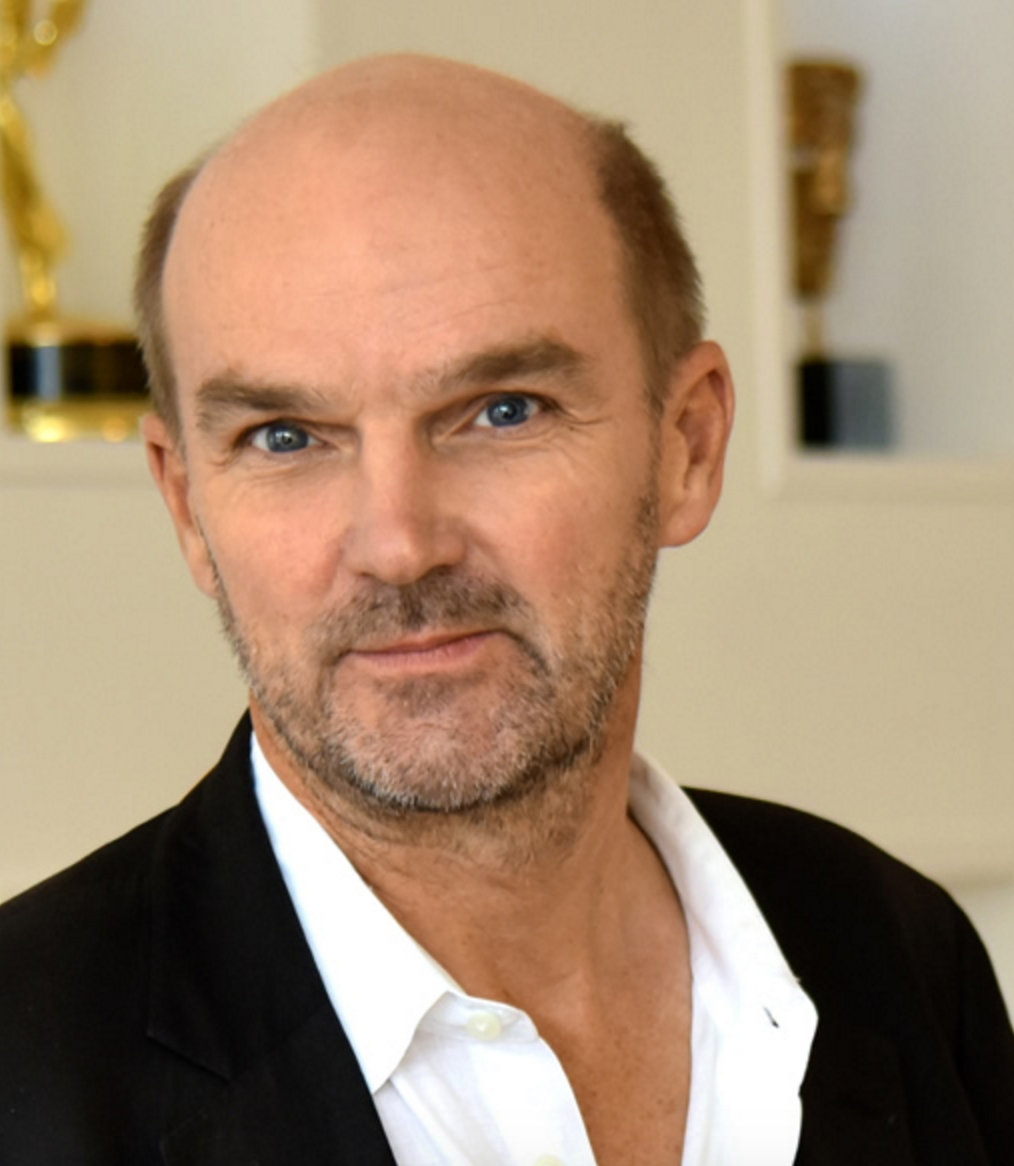
- Stephen Lambert in 2015
- Born: 22 March 1959 (age 67); London, England
- Education: University of East Anglia (B.A., Politics and Philosophy, 1981); Nuffield College, University of Oxford (MLitt, Politics, 1982)
- Occupations: Television producer businessperson
- Years active: 1983-present
- Notable work: Wife Swap; Faking It; The Secret Millionaire; Undercover Boss; Gogglebox; Squid Game: The Challenge; The Circle; The Traitors
- Spouse: Jenni Russell (m. 1988)
- Children: 2
- Website: http://www.studiolambert.com

Stephen Lambert OBE (born 22 March 1959) is an English television producer and executive who works in Britain and America. He is the chief executive of Studio Lambert, one of All3Media's production companies, which produces Gogglebox, Undercover Boss, Squid Game: The Challenge, Race Across the World, The Circle and The Traitors. It also produces scripted series including Three Girls, The Nest and Boarders.

In Lambert's previous job at the independent production company RDF, he was responsible for global unscripted hits such as Wife Swap, Faking It and The Secret Millionaire.

== Early life ==
Born in London, Lambert was educated at Thames Valley Grammar School and the University of East Anglia, graduating with a first in politics and philosophy. He studied as a post-graduate student at Nuffield College, Oxford, where he wrote a book on the history of British broadcasting policy published by the British Film Institute called Channel 4: Television with a Difference? which coincided with the launch of Britain's fourth terrestrial channel in November 1982.

== BBC ==
In 1983, he joined the BBC and worked in the Documentaries Department for the next fifteen years. He was a producer and director of documentaries for the BAFTA-winning BBC2 series 40 Minutes and the BBC1 series Inside Story; many set in conflict areas such as Sri Lanka, Croatia, South Africa, Kuwait, Gaza and Northern Ireland. Between 1992 and 1994, he produced and directed a six-part documentary series for BBC2 about the Foreign and Commonwealth Office which was filmed in Northern Iraq, the former Soviet Union, Bosnia, Thailand, Saudi Arabia, Europe, the US and in Whitehall.

In 1994, Lambert became the founding editor of BBC2's main documentary strand of the 1990s, Modern Times. While running Modern Times, he executive produced some of the first BBC1 docu-soaps, including The Clampers and Lakesiders, as well as the fly-on-the-wall series about Sunderland A.F.C., Premier Passions and the five part Royal Television Society award-winning series about the Department of Social Security called The System. Lambert also started a long working relationship with the film-maker Adam Curtis, executive producing his series The Mayfair Set, winner of the 2000 BAFTA award for best factual series.

== RDF Media ==
In 1998, Lambert left the BBC to join independent production company RDF Media as its first director of programs. He devised and executive produced the acclaimed series Faking It which premiered on Channel 4 in 2000. It won the BAFTA best features program award in 2001 and 2002 and the Rose d'Or in 2003. This was followed by Wife Swap, which attracted audiences of more than six million. It won the BAFTA best features program award in 2003 and the Rose D'Or in 2004. Lambert continued working with Adam Curtis, executive producing his The Century of the Self (2002), The Power of Nightmares (2004) (winner of BAFTA best factual series award 2004), and The Trap (2007).

From 1998 to 2005, RDF Media grew rapidly with Lambert spearheading its editorial development. RDF started producing in the US and opened its RDF USA production office in Los Angeles. In 2004, Lambert executive produced the US network version of Wife Swap which launched on ABC. RDF received Broadcast's Best Production Company of the Year Award for 2002, 2004 and 2006; the only company to win this award three times. In May 2005, RDF Media floated on the London Stock Exchange's Alternative Investment Market and started to acquire other independent production companies. Lambert became the group's chief creative officer. He continued to devise new formats such as The Secret Millionaire, which won the Rose d'Or in 2007, Shipwrecked: Battle of the Islands for Channel 4, and The Verdict for BBC2.

In 2007, Lambert resigned from RDF after taking responsibility over a misleadingly edited trailer for a BBC documentary which appeared to show the Queen storming out of a photoshoot with Annie Leibovitz. In fact, she was walking in. Peter Fincham, Controller of BBC One, and his head of publicity also resigned from their jobs.

== Studio Lambert ==
In 2008, Lambert launched a new independent production company, Studio Lambert, based in London and Los Angeles. In the 2024 Broadcast survey of independent UK production companies, Studio Lambert ranked #3 by size of turnover. It has been named Best Independent Production Company three times at the Broadcast Awards and won Production Company of the Year at the Edinburgh TV Awards 2024.

Lambert's first major formatted show in his new company was Undercover Boss, which started on Britain's Channel 4 in 2009 and has been produced in dozens of countries around the world. Studio Lambert produces an American version which premiered on CBS in February 2010 immediately after the Super Bowl to a record-breaking audience of nearly 40 million viewers. It went on to become the highest rating new show of the 2009-10 television season with an average audience of 17 million viewers and to earn an Emmy Awards nomination for Outstanding Reality Program every year from 2010 to 2016, winning the category in 2012 and 2013.

In March 2013, Studio Lambert launched Gogglebox on Channel 4, a weekly show observing ordinary people watching and reviewing the week's television. It has become "one of Britain's most popular shows", winning many awards including a BAFTA and five National Television Awards and local versions are produced in more than thirty countries.

Lambert launched a scripted division in his company in 2015. The first scripted show, Three Girls, won five BAFTA awards. This was followed by The Feed for Amazon Prime, The Nest and Three Families for BBC One, and three seasons of Boarders for BBC Three.

Recent unscripted successes include The Traitors and Race Across the World. In 2025, nearly 10 million viewers watched the finale of The Traitors. Race Across the World is the biggest factual title on the BBC so far in 2025. Both shows have won BAFTA Awards.

Other Studio Lambert productions include The Circle, Naked Attraction and Four in a Bed.

In 2023, Stephen Lambert was an executive producer on Squid Game: The Challenge for Netflix. The show was No. 1 on Netflix’s list of Top 10 English-language show for the first two weeks after its release, with a total of over 224 million hours watched within the first 21 days. On 6 December 2023, prior to the release of the season one finale, Netflix announced a second season order.

== Personal life ==
Lambert married journalist and broadcaster Jenni Russell in 1988. They have two children and live in London. Russell, born in Johannesburg in 1960, studied history at St Catharine's College, Cambridge. She has served as editor of The World Tonight on BBC Radio 4, won the Orwell Prize in 2011 and writes for The Times.

== Awards and honours ==
Lambert's programmes have won dozens of awards including BAFTA awards, the Rose D'Or of Montreux, and both Primetime and International Emmy Awards.

Lambert was named a Fellow of the Royal Television Society in 2016 and received its Outstanding Achievement Award in 2024.

Other honours include:

- The Huffington Post “Game Changer” (2010)
- C21/FRAPA Gold Medal at MIPCOM (2013)
- Induction into the Realscreen Hall of Fame (2014)

Lambert was appointed an Officer of the Order of the British Empire (OBE) in the 2025 Birthday Honours for services to television.
