= John Goodby =

British materials chemist

John William Goodby is a British materials chemist.

He is the Chairman of Materials Chemistry at the University of York. He studies liquid crystals, complex fluids and self-organising systems. He was elected a Fellow of the Royal Society in 2011 and received their Royal Medal in 2016 "for his major advances and discoveries of new forms of matter and materials, in particular the development of chiral liquid crystals."
