= Our Future Our Choice =

British pro-European Union advocacy group for young people

- OFOC's Logo
- Abbreviation: OFOC
- Formation: 19 October 2017; 9 years ago
- Founders: Femi Oluwole; Calum Millbank-Murphy; Lara Spirit; Will Dry
- Type: Campaign group
- Purpose: Pro-European Union advocacy group for young people
- Location: Millbank Tower, 21–24 Millbank, London, England, SW1P 4QP
- Spokesman: Femi Oluwole
- Spokesman: Calum Millbank-Murphy
- Co-president: Lara Spirit
- Co-president: Will Dry

Our Future Our Choice (OFOC) was a British pro-European Union advocacy group for young people.

== History ==
The Twitter account for OFOC was created 19 October 2017. OFOC was incorporated as a company on 19 February 2018. Its four founding members were Femi Oluwole (spokesman), Calum Millbank-Murphy (spokesman), Lara Spirit (co-president) and Will Dry (co-president).

== Activities ==
OFOC heavily criticised the government's approach to negotiating Brexit. In July 2018 it protested outside Chequers during a cabinet summit, holding a banner which read 'Your Brexit Deal Screws Our Future: Explain Yourselves'. In June 2018 OFOC and For our Future's Sake (FFS) unfurled a banner which read "Stop backing Brexit" at a festival event organised by the Labour Party nicknamed "JezFest" after the party's leader Jeremy Corbyn.

In the same month OFOC produced a host of billboard advertising targeting frontbench Labour Members of Parliament (MPs), accusing them of "being in the pockets" of hardline Brexiteers. The adverts were similar to those produced by the Conservative Party for the 2015 general election which suggested that the then Labour leader, Ed Miliband, was "in the pocket" of the former leader of the Scottish National Party, Alex Salmond.

Left-wing outlets such as the Red Robin have claimed that OFOC was funded by centre right donors. OFOC's website stated that it was "powered by: Best for Britain, Open Britain, and The European Movement". OFOC have advocated the view that Corbynite radical change would be inhibited by Brexit due to a lack of political bandwidth and the potential negative economic consequences.

OFOC later hosted, along with FFS, a number of "Parliament Takeover" events where a large group of young people visit Parliament's central lobby and meet with their local MPs to discuss a people's vote.

OFOC's founders were regular speakers at anti-Brexit events up and down the country. This includes the People's Vote march and later the Put It To The People march on the 23 March 2019. The People's Vote campaign claimed the latter was attended by over 1 million people, although independent fact-checkers actually suggested between 312,000 and 400,000 attendees.

== See also ==
- Opposition to Brexit in the United Kingdom
- European Union Withdrawal Agreement (Public Vote) Bill 2017–19
- 2016 United Kingdom European Union membership referendum
- For our Future's Sake
