= Michael Hrebeniak =

British academic, author, film-maker and journalist

- Title: Senior college lecturer in English

Academic work
- Institutions: New School of the Anthropocene, University College London, University of Cambridge; Wolfson College; Magdalene College

Dr Michael Hrebeniak is a British academic, author, film-maker and journalist.

Between 2007 and 2021 he was Director of Studies in English at Wolfson College and a lecturer in English at Magdalene College, Cambridge. He previously taught humanities and jazz history at the Royal Academy of Music and metropolitan studies at New York University, and held a research fellowship at Cranfield University, where he explored the uses of art in organisational leadership across the areas of climate change and creativity. He has also been a producer for Optic Nerve, an independent company specialising in poetry documentaries for Channel 4. He currently co-leads the English Faculty's Performance Research Rhizome and the Performance: Art-Critique-Experiment (P:ACE) collaboration between Cambridge and Central Saint Martins, and chaired the faculty's Visual Culture Subject Group for several years.

His concern with interdisciplinarity informed his first book, Action Writing: Jack Kerouac's Wild Form, published by Southern Illinois University Press in 2006 and nominated for an MLA prize. It offers a direct engagement with the mid-century American cultural field. He is currently working on two new books: a study of ecological currents in post-war American poetry and a psychogeographical account of the medieval Stourbridge Fair. He has been interested in places and atmospheres ever since he was a boy. "I grew up in an area of suburban north-west London striking for its lack of character – a nowhere kind of place where 20th century development wiped out the past. I suppose I've always been attentive to traces of cultural memory. As a child, I lacked the language to frame it as such, but Im interested in the habitat and signatures of place and how they're encoded within the material forms of the commonplace."

His journalism has appeared in The Guardian and The Observer. From 2002 to 2007, he was a visiting fellow at the Praxis Centre at Cranfield University School of Management, where he researched the yoking of the arts to the fostering of creativity and sustainability across organisations, including central government. He is the editor of Radical Poetics and has appeared on BBC Radio 4.

Hrebeniank was one of 224 academics who signed a letter in The Guardian in February 2019 in support of the school climate strike protests.
