= Jenni Russell =

British journalist and broadcaster (born 1960)

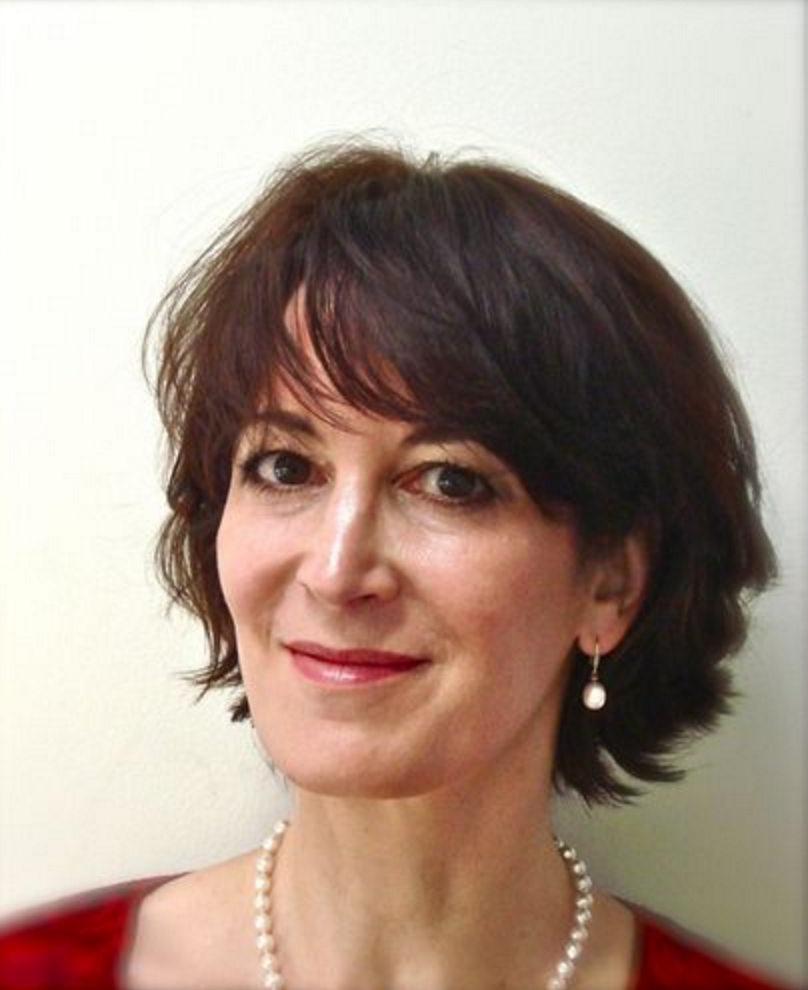
- Russell in 2016
- Born: Jenni Cecily Russell; 16 July 1960 (age 66); Johannesburg, Transvaal, South Africa
- Education: St Catharine's College, Cambridge
- Occupation: Columnist
- Known for: Columnist at The Times; Columnist at The New York Times; Former editor of The World Tonight
- Spouse: Stephen Lambert (m. 1988)
- Children: 2

Jenni Cecily Russell (born 16 July 1960) is a British journalist and broadcaster. She is a columnist for The Times, a contributing writer for The New York Times, and a book reviewer for The Sunday Times. She has been a columnist for The Guardian and written the political column for London Evening Standard.

She worked for many years at the BBC and ITN, latterly as editor of The World Tonight on BBC Radio 4. She is married to Stephen Lambert, a media executive, and lives in London.

== Career ==
Russell studied history at St Catharine's College, Cambridge, and went on to become a BBC News trainee. She worked for the BBC, as well as ITN and Channel 4 News. In 1998 she became joint editor of BBC Radio 4's The World Tonight. On leaving the BBC, Russell began writing comment pieces for The Guardian and the New Statesman, before beginning to write regularly for The Sunday Times, for whom she also reviews books. She has been a vocal critic of the failings of the education system and criticised the increasing abuse of civil liberties under the last Labour government.

In May 2011, she won the Orwell Prize for Political Journalism, having been shortlisted for the Commentariat of the Year at the 2010 Comment Awards. She was described as "the stand-out journalist in an outstanding field".

She wrote the Monday political column for the London Evening Standard for two years, from 2011 to 2013, and was shortlisted for the inaugural Hatchet Job of the Year Award in 2012 for her work on as a book reviewer in The Sunday Times.

In 2013, she became a member of the independent expert panel advising the government on the initiation and publication of Serious Case Reviews, and in August that year began writing a column on Thursdays for The Times. At the 2015 Comment Awards she was named Society & Diversity Commentator of the Year.

In 2017, Russell started writing for the New York Times as a contributing opinion writer. In 2020, she was long-listed for the Orwell Prize.

Russell regularly appears on television and radio, including on the BBC's Newsnight and on Sky News.
