= Susana Medina =

English-Spanish writer (born 1966)

- Born: 31 January 1966 (age 60); Hampshire, England
- Education: Birkbeck College, London
- Occupation: writer

Susana Medina (31 January 1966) is an English-Spanish writer.

== Career ==
Born in Hampshire, England of a Spanish father and a German mother of Czech origin, she grew up in Valencia, Spain, and has lived in London since 1989. Susana Medina has written and published poetry, a novel, stories, essays and a cinematographic script. She has received numerous awards, including the Max Aub International Short Story Prize in 1994.

== Works ==
She is the author of Red Tales Cuentos Rojos, Souvenirs del Accidente, Philosophical Toys and Borgesland, her doctoral thesis on Jorge Luis Borges and imaginary spaces. Her short film Buñuel's Philosophical Toys, focuses on the instances of fetishism in the films of the Spanish filmmaker Luis Buñuel.
