= David Pollard (cricketer) =

English cricketer

David Pollard (7 August 1835 – 26 March 1909) was an English first-class cricketer, who played one match for Yorkshire County Cricket Club against Surrey against Bramall Lane in 1865, and one game for an England XI against Cambridge University in 1872.

Born in Cowmes, Huddersfield, Yorkshire, Pollard scored a duck and three, and took 0 for 19 with his right arm medium pace in his game for Yorkshire, which Surrey won by 10 wickets. He took 2 for 75, in a marathon 51 overs, and 0 for 30 in 21 more in the second innings for the England XI, and scored three runs in his only knock.

Pollard died on 26 March 1909, in Lepton, Huddersfield.
