= Keith Armstrong (activist) =

Disability rights activist and artist (1950 – 2017)

- Born: 7 April 1950
- Died: May 7, 2017 (aged 67)
- Known for: Disability activism

Keith Armstrong (7 April 1950 – 7 May 2017) was a disability activist whose efforts contributed towards the Disability Discrimination Act (1995), and an artist and photographer whose images documented protests and everyday life for disabled people in the UK.

== Early life ==
Armstrong was born in South Africa in 1950 to parents who had met during World War II. His father died just before his birth, and at six months of age, Armstrong contracted polio. As a result, he used a wheelchair from a young age. His family moved to the UK and Armstrong attended the Ormerod School, then later Hephaistos School. He then studied at the National Star Centre for Disabled Youth.

== Advocacy and activism ==
In 1972, Armstrong moved to London. After an experience of homelessness, he volunteered as a housing officer. He then worked for Ealing Council as a disabilities coordinator in housing.

Armstrong was particularly active in campaigning for improvements to accessibility of transportation. Armstrong was a founder member of the Liberation Network of People with Disabilities. He was involved in the Campaign for Accessible Transport and the Disabled People's Direct Action Network. When he was arrested with fellow protestors for blocking New Oxford Street, the case was thrown out because the court did not have ramp access for wheelchairs and he could not attend his own trial.

In 1983, Armstrong became the first member with a disability on the London Transport Passenger Committee. He was a committee member of Camden Dial-a-Ride and eventually became chair of the London users association. Armstrong campaigned for Parliament to improve accessible bus provision, and travelled the UK and abroad to study transport systems. He was also a consultant to Greater London Council committees and to the TUC Transport Division. He also became a senior transport officer.

From the early 1970s, Armstrong had a flat in Euston, and he was active in campaigns in Camden and especially the Somers Town area, including tenants rights groups, in efforts to Save the Elizabeth Garrett Anderson Hospital for Women in the 1970s. He ran for election to Camden Council's Somers Town Ward.

Seeing struggles for rights as connected, Armstrong also campaigned for peace (he compiled a disability special issue of Peace News in December 1976), with CND, for housing rights and the anti-apartheid movement.

== Photography and other art ==
Armstrong used an Olympus camera to document disability rights activism and his own life more broadly. He captured more than 500 images of picket lines, bus blockades, and protests outside Parliament, and key people in the disability rights movement including Allan Sutherland and Tracy Proudlock. Digital Camera World magazine recognised Armstrong's significance and noted that his images were particularly powerful because unlike many photojournalists, his vantage point was both within the crowd of protestors and from a wheelchair.

Armstrong also created concrete poetry and was a typewriter artist.

== Later life ==
Armstrong died of cancer in 2017. His funeral shroud was covered with badges representing the causes for which he fought during his life.

== Commemoration ==
Armstrong's work and archive is part of the National Disability Movement Archive and Collection at the Bishopsgate Institute. The Bodleian Libraries Special Collections also hold a box of his collection.

Keith Armstrong was identified as one of the key figures from the disability rights movement in the UK and his collection was digitised by Shape Arts as part of a National Lottery Heritage Fund grant and made available in June 2026.
