= More United =

- Founded: 24 July 2016
- Dissolved: 17 January 2023
- Headquarters: London
- Ideology: Pro-Europeanism; Progressivism; Environmentalism
- Political position: Centre

Website
- moreunited.org.uk

More United was a cross-party political movement in the United Kingdom. It described itself as a "tech-driven political startup" that supported candidates regardless of party affiliation. The movement advocated for public service investment, democratic reform, a green economy, tolerant society, and co-operation with the EU.

More United took its name from the maiden speech delivered by Jo Cox, a British MP who was murdered in June 2016.

== Values ==
The movement said it would support any candidate from any party who backed its values and pledged to advance them in Parliament:

- Opportunity: we need a fair economy that bridges the gap between rich and poor.
- Tolerance: we want to live in a free, diverse society where our differences are celebrated and respected.
- Democracy: we want you to have real influence over politics.
- Environment: we must do everything possible to tackle climate change and protect our environment.
- Openness: we welcome immigration, but understand it must work for everyone, and believe in bringing down international barriers, not raising them. We also want a close relationship with Europe.

== History ==
Following the result of the 2016 UK referendum on EU membership, in which the country voted to withdraw from the European Union, there was considerable media discussion concerning the future of the British centre ground. Press rumours of a split in the Labour Party had occurred since Jeremy Corbyn's election as leader in 2015; this intensified after pro-EU members of his shadow cabinet resigned in protest of his allegedly weak support for the Remain campaign, leading to a leadership challenge by Owen Smith. The Conservatives also faced the prospect of an ideological split, as some pro-EU Conservatives feared the potential consequences of Andrea Leadsom defeating Theresa May in the leadership election; Leadsom ultimately withdrew from the race, handing unopposed victory to May. Paddy Ashdown, the former leader of the Liberal Democrats, wrote an article in The Times accusing both parties of failing to provide reasonable solutions to the issues afflicting communities across Britain.

More United was founded in July 2016 by a team drawn from business, academia, and politics: Austin Rathe, Bess Mayhew, Corinne Sawers and Maurice Biriotti. They received support from cross party MPs, led by Paddy Ashdown. It was dissolved in January 2023.

== Election campaigns ==
=== 2016 Richmond Park by-election ===
More United voted to support Liberal Democrat candidate Sarah Olney, who subsequently defeated the incumbent MP, Zac Goldsmith, in December 2016.

=== 2017 general election ===
On 23 November 2016, More United launched a crowdfunding campaign to raise money to help support candidates. By 22 December, the campaign had raised £274,164.

Candidates endorsed by More United
Candidate	Seat	Party	Announced	Result
Amna Ahmad	Sutton and Cheam	Liberal Democrats	4 May 2017	2nd
Rosena Allin-Khan	Tooting	Labour	4 May 2017	✓
Kelly-Marie Blundell	Lewes	Liberal Democrats	4 May 2017	2nd
Jack Dromey	Birmingham Erdington	Labour	4 May 2017	✓
Liz Kendall	Leicester West	Labour	4 May 2017	✓
Stephen Kinnock	Aberavon	Labour	4 May 2017	✓
Clive Lewis	Norwich South	Labour	4 May 2017	✓
Vix Lowthion	Isle of Wight	Green	4 May 2017	3rd
Caroline Lucas	Brighton Pavilion	Green	4 May 2017	✓
Ian Lucas	Wrexham	Labour	4 May 2017	✓
Tessa Munt	Wells	Liberal Democrats	4 May 2017	2nd
Gareth Thomas	Harrow West	Labour Co-op	4 May 2017	✓
Ruth Cadbury	Brentford and Isleworth	Labour	8 May 2017	✓
Jane Dodds	Montgomeryshire	Liberal Democrats	8 May 2017	2nd
Andrew George	St Ives	Liberal Democrats	8 May 2017	2nd
Mark Hunter	Cheadle	Liberal Democrats	8 May 2017	2nd
Peter Kyle	Hove	Labour	8 May 2017	✓
Norman Lamb	Norfolk North	Liberal Democrats	8 May 2017	✓
Alison McGovern	Wirral South	Labour	8 May 2017	✓
Ian Murray	Edinburgh South	Labour	8 May 2017	✓
Anna Soubry	Broxtowe	Conservative	8 May 2017	✓
Jo Swinson	East Dunbartonshire	Liberal Democrats	8 May 2017	✓
Sophie Walker	Shipley	Women's Equality	8 May 2017	4th
John Woodcock	Barrow and Furness	Labour Co-op	8 May 2017	✓
Vince Cable	Twickenham	Liberal Democrats	18 May 2017	✓
Alistair Carmichael	Orkney and Shetland	Liberal Democrats	18 May 2017	✓
Gloria De Piero	Ashfield	Labour	18 May 2017	✓
Christine Jardine	Edinburgh West	Liberal Democrats	18 May 2017	✓
Rachel Reeves	Leeds West	Labour	18 May 2017	✓
Elizabeth Riches	North East Fife	Liberal Democrats	18 May 2017	2nd
Jo Roundell Greene	Yeovil	Liberal Democrats	18 May 2017	2nd
Gavin Shuker	Luton South	Labour Co-op	18 May 2017	✓
Chuka Umunna	Streatham	Labour	18 May 2017	✓
Chris Bryant	Rhondda	Labour	24 May 2017	✓
Daisy Cooper	St Albans	Liberal Democrats	24 May 2017	2nd
Stephen Doughty	Cardiff South and Penarth	Labour Co-op	24 May 2017	✓
David Lammy	Tottenham	Labour	24 May 2017	✓
Sue McGuire	Southport	Liberal Democrats	24 May 2017	3rd
Jonathan Reynolds	Stalybridge and Hyde	Labour Co-op	24 May 2017	✓
Owen Smith	Pontypridd	Labour	24 May 2017	✓
Jamie Stone	Caithness, Sutherland and Easter Ross	Liberal Democrats	24 May 2017	✓
George Turner	Vauxhall	Liberal Democrats	24 May 2017	2nd
Geraint Davies	Swansea West	Labour Co-op	2 June 2017	✓
Seema Malhotra	Feltham and Heston	Labour Co-op	2 June 2017	✓
Sarah Olney	Richmond Park	Liberal Democrats	2 June 2017	2nd
Emma Reynolds	Wolverhampton North East	Labour	2 June 2017	✓
Tulip Siddiq	Hampstead and Kilburn	Labour	2 June 2017	✓
Andy Slaughter	Hammersmith	Labour	2 June 2017	✓
Mark Williams	Ceredigion	Liberal Democrats	2 June 2017	2nd

=== 2019 general election ===
It was not uncommon for More United to endorse more than one candidate in the same seat.

Candidates endorsed by More United
Candidate	Seat	Party	Result
Louis Adam	Warwick and Leamington	Liberal Democrats	3rd
Humaira Ali	Bermondsey and Old Southwark	Liberal Democrats	2nd
Rosena Allin-Khan	Tooting	Labour	✓
Fleur Anderson	Putney	Labour	✓
Tonia Antoniazzi	Gower	Labour	✓
Alyson Barnes	Rossendale and Darwen	Labour	2nd
Richard Benwell	Wantage	Liberal Democrats	2nd
Luciana Berger	Finchley and Golders Green	Liberal Democrats	2nd
Jason Billin	Rushcliffe	Liberal Democrats	3rd
Ben Bradshaw	Exeter	Labour	✓
Tom Brake	Carshalton and Wallington	Liberal Democrats	2nd
Ruth Cadbury	Brentford and Isleworth	Labour	✓
Lisa Cameron	East Kilbride, Strathaven and Lesmahagow	SNP	✓
Alistair Carmichael	Orkney and Shetland	Liberal Democrats	✓
Wendy Chamberlain	North East Fife	Liberal Democrats	✓
Daisy Cooper	St Albans	Liberal Democrats	✓
Charlotte Cornell	Dover	Labour	2nd
Mary Creagh	Wakefield	Labour	2nd
Nic Dakin	Scunthorpe	Labour	2nd
Geraint Davies	Swansea West	Labour	✓
Martyn Day	Linlithgow and East Falkirk	SNP	✓
Marsha de Cordova	Battersea	Labour	✓
Lynn Denham	Worcester	Labour	2nd
Kishan Devani	Montgomeryshire	Liberal Democrats	2nd
Jane Dodds	Brecon and Radnorshire	Liberal Democrats	2nd
Stephen Doughty	Cardiff South and Penarth	Labour	✓
Rosie Duffield	Canterbury	Labour	✓
Rachel Eden	Reading West	Labour Co-op	2nd
Paula Ferguson	Winchester	Liberal Democrats	2nd
Natalie Fleet	Ashfield	Labour	3rd
David Gauke	South West Hertfordshire	Independent	2nd
Andrew George	St Ives	Liberal Democrats	2nd
Stephen Gethins	North East Fife	SNP	2nd
Preet Gill	Birmingham Edgbaston	Labour Co-op	✓
Mark Gitsham	Battersea	Liberal Democrats	3rd
Helen Goodman	Bishop Auckland	Labour	2nd
Laura Gordon	Sheffield Hallam	Liberal Democrats	2nd
Ruth Gripper	Truro and Falmouth	Liberal Democrats	3rd
John Grogan	Keighley	Labour	2nd
Sam Gyimah	Kensington	Liberal Democrats	3rd
Oli Henman	Lewes	Liberal Democrats	2nd
Andrew Hilland	Lanark and Hamilton East	Labour	3rd
Wera Hobhouse	Bath	Liberal Democrats	✓
Charlotte Holloway	Plymouth Moor View	Labour	2nd
Kamran Hussain	Leeds North West	Liberal Democrats	3rd
Christine Jardine	Edinburgh West	Liberal Democrats	✓
Darren Jones	Bristol North West	Labour	✓
Liz Kendall	Leicester West	Labour	✓
Peter Kyle	Hove	Labour	✓
Ben Lake	Ceredigion	Plaid Cymru	✓
Peter Lamb	Crawley	Labour	2nd
David Lammy	Tottenham	Labour	✓
Phillip Lee	Wokingham (UK Parliament constituency)	Liberal Democrats	2nd
Stephen Lloyd	Eastbourne	Liberal Democrats	2nd
Caroline Lucas	Brighton Pavilion	Green	✓
Seema Malhotra	Feltham and Heston	Labour	✓
Paul Masterton	East Renfrewshire	Conservative	2nd
Martin McCluskey	Inverclyde	Labour	2nd
Stewart McDonald	Glasgow South	SNP	✓
Stuart McDonald	Cumbernauld, Kilsyth and Kirkintilloch East	SNP	✓
Alison McGovern	Wirral South	Labour	✓
Catherine McKinnell	Newcastle upon Tyne North	Labour	✓
Beth Miller	Corby	Labour	2nd
Ed Miliband	Doncaster North	Labour	✓
Anne Milton	Guildford	Independent	4th
Layla Moran	Oxford West and Abingdon	Liberal Democrats	✓
Stephen Morgan	Portsmouth South	Labour	✓
Tom Morrison	Cheadle	Liberal Democrats	2nd
Tessa Munt	Wells	Liberal Democrats	2nd
Ian Murray	Edinburgh South	Labour	✓
Chris Ostrowski	Watford	Labour	2nd
Jess Phillips	Birmingham Yardley	Labour	✓
Emma Reynolds	Wolverhampton North East	Labour	2nd
Judith Rogerson	Harrogate and Knaresborough	Liberal Democrats	2nd
Antoinette Sandbach	Eddisbury	Liberal Democrats	3rd
Liz Saville Roberts	Dwyfor Meirionnydd	Plaid Cymru	✓
Gavin Shuker	Luton South	Independent	3rd
Tulip Siddiq	Hampstead and Kilburn	Labour	✓
Andy Slaughter	Hammersmith	Labour	✓
Lisa Smart	Hazel Grove	Liberal Democrats	2nd
Alex Sobel	Leeds North West	Labour Co-op	✓
Chris Stephens	Glasgow South West	SNP	✓
Jamie Stone	Caithness, Sutherland and Easter Ross	Liberal Democrats	✓
Ian Stotesbury	Watford	Liberal Democrats	3rd
Wes Streeting	Ilford North	Labour	✓
Alison Taylor	Paisley and Renfrewshire North	Labour	2nd
Gareth Thomas	Harrow West	Labour Co-op	✓
Chuka Umunna	Cities of London and Westminster	Liberal Democrats	2nd
Gerald Vernon-Jackson	Portsmouth South	Liberal Democrats	3rd
Karen Ward	North Norfolk	Liberal Democrats	2nd
Kate Watson	Glasgow East	Labour	2nd
Catherine West	Hornsey and Wood Green	Labour	✓
Martin Whitfield	East Lothian	Labour	2nd
Philippa Whitford	Central Ayrshire	SNP	✓
Emma Whysall	Chipping Barnet	Labour	2nd
Max Wilkinson	Cheltenham	Liberal Democrats	2nd
Hywel Williams	Arfon	Plaid Cymru	✓
Mark Williams	Ceredigion	Liberal Democrats	3rd
Paul Williams	Stockton South	Labour	2nd
Phil Wilson	Sedgefield	Labour	2nd
Munira Wilson	Twickenham	Liberal Democrats	✓
Sue Wixley	Putney	Liberal Democrats	3rd
Sarah Wollaston	Totnes	Liberal Democrats	2nd
John Wright	Southport	Liberal Democrats	3rd

== Issue-based campaigns ==
Following the 2017 election, More United conducted UK-wide and online consultations with supporters to identify their priorities for the movement. The issues supporters identified as being the most important to campaign on were the NHS, equality and Brexit.

=== NHS/Brexit Campaign, 2018 ===
In February 2017, More United launched a campaign to secure a Parliamentary debate on how Brexit would impact the NHS, arguing that the government had not given this question sufficient consideration. Thousands of supporters were mobilised to contact their MPs in support of the campaign, which led to 47 MPs from five parties submitting a request for a backbench business debate. That debate was held in Parliament on 22 March.

=== Campaign to restore the Access to Elected Office Fund, 2018 ===
In April 2018, More United supported the launch of a legal challenge against the government, led by three deaf and disabled candidates of different parties, all of whom were also Members of More United. The focus of the challenge was to get the government to restore a Fund that existed from 2012 to 2015 to help deaf and disabled candidates of all parties, at all levels, with the extra costs of standing for election. The Fund was frozen and placed under review in 2015, but no findings from the review or a decision on the Fund's future had been published in nearly three years. More United launched a campaign alongside the legal challenge, with thousands of supporters signing a petition to get the government to restore the Fund.

This campaign received endorsement from 19 of the UK's most prominent deaf and disabled people, who came together from across the realms of business, entertainment, academia and politics to publish an open letter of support in The Sunday Times. The campaign also received backing from three disabled MPs from three parties. Labour MP Marsha de Cordova, Liberal Democrat MP Stephen Lloyd and Conservative MP Robert Halfon co-wrote a letter to the Home Office asking for the immediate restoration of the Fund.

== Convenors ==
In addition to its founders, a number of prominent public figures endorsed the movement's launch, with the following being listed as the organisation's Convenors:

- Josh Babarinde, social entrepreneur, youth worker, and later President of the Liberal Democrats
- Maurice Birotti, businessman and academic
- Jeremy Bliss, lawyer and entrepreneur
- Clare Gerada, medical practitioner
- Sunny Hundal, columnist and lecturer
- Anne-Marie Imafidon, social tech entrepreneur
- Martha Lane Fox, entrepreneur
- Gia Milinovich, writer and presenter
- Maajid Nawaz, author, activist and columnist
- Jonathon Porritt, environmentalist
- Luke Pritchard, musician and entertainer
- Simon Schama, writer, broadcaster and professor
- Janet Smith, former Lady Justice of Appeal
- Dan Snow, broadcaster
- Rumi Vergee, entrepreneur and philanthropist

== See also ==
- Independent Progressive
