= Femi Oluwole =

British political activist (born 1990)

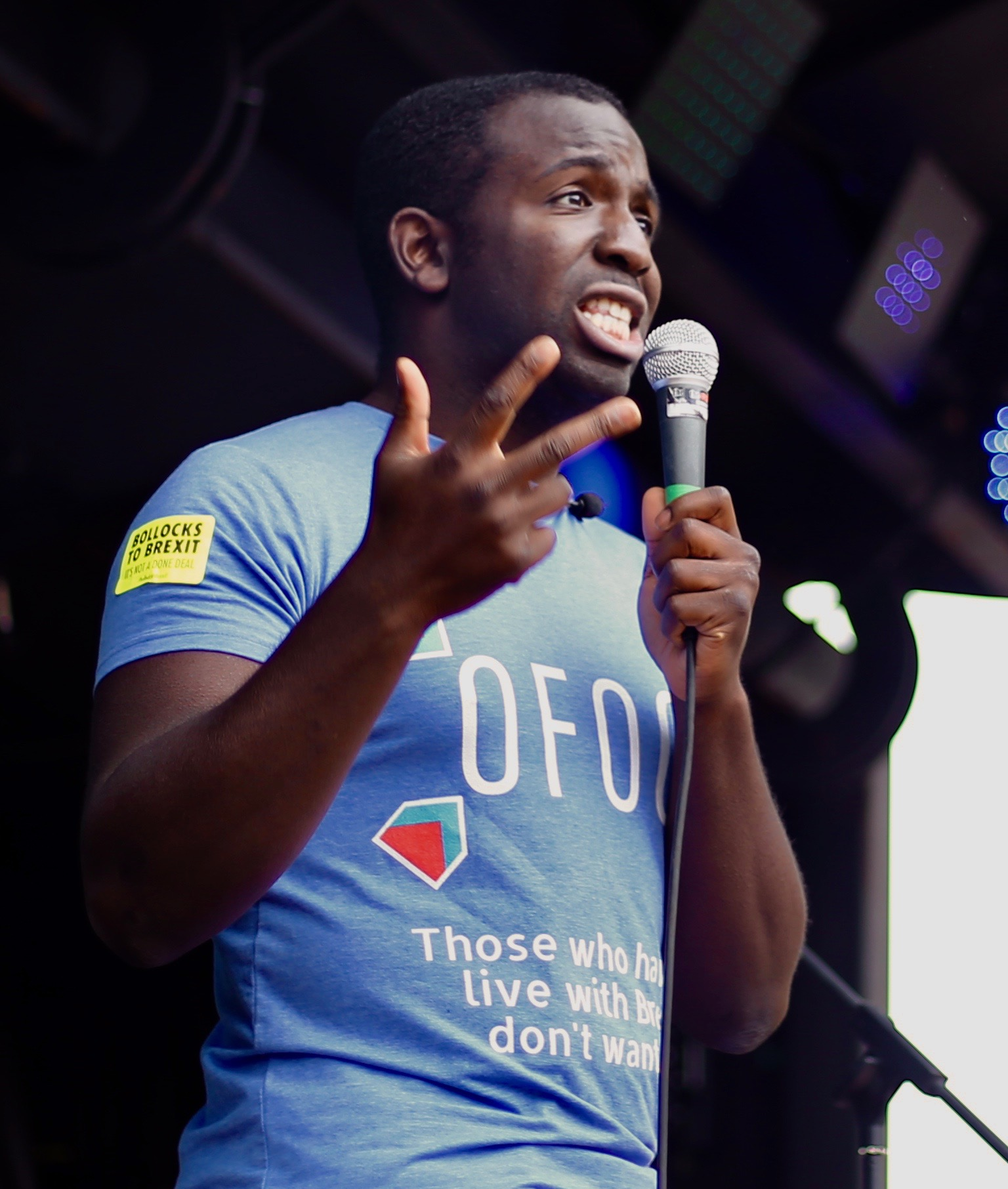
- Oluwole speaking at Birmingham's Bin-Brexit rally in 2018
- Born: 17 March 1990 (age 36); Darlington, County Durham, England
- Education: University of Nottingham (LLB)
- Political party: Labour (2019–2020); Green Party of England and Wales (since 2025)

Femi Oluwole (born 17 March 1990) is a British political activist, journalist and co-founder of the anti-Brexit youth advocacy group Our Future Our Choice. He has appeared as a commentator and activist on British television. He has written for The Independent, The Guardian and Metro.

== Early life and education ==
Oluwole was born in Darlington, County Durham, to Nigerian parents – a surgeon father and a paediatrician mother, who both immigrated to the United Kingdom in the 1980s. He grew up in the West Midlands but as a child lived in several different places across the country, having once attended a school in Dundee. He was privately educated at the Yarm School, and went on to study law and the French language at the University of Nottingham, while completing an Erasmus Programme year in France.

== Career ==
Oluwole has interned in non-governmental organisations and human rights agencies. At the age of 27 he left his traineeship and moved into his parents' loft to become a campaigner against Brexit, telling the Evening Standard that he made the decision to quit two months before his traineeship ended because he was "frustrated that the pro-Remain argument was not being made effectively by mainstream politicians." In pursuing this, Oluwole created the social media channel Our Future Our Choice in September 2017, which, with the collaboration of Will Dry and Lara Spirit, who had launched an anti-Brexit student activism movement in universities, was incorporated as a company on 19 February 2018. The group advocated a pro-EU message from a youth standpoint. He supported the People's Vote campaign for a further referendum on EU membership.

Oluwole regularly appeared in the media during the process of the United Kingdom's exit from the European Union. Oluwole has written for The Independent, The Guardian, and the Metro, and has appeared on Talkradio.

In July 2019, Richard Tice, the then chair of the Brexit Party, threatened to sue Oluwole after he alleged that Leave.EU (an organisation Tice co-founded) was "overtly antisemitic". Leave.EU had posted a caricature of Jewish businessman and Holocaust survivor George Soros puppeteering former Prime Minister Tony Blair, captioned "The face of the People's Vote campaign". Oluwole refused to apologise.

Oluwole joined the Labour party in early 2019 after the 2019 general election because he believed that it was the only way the party would listen to him about implementing a proportional representation system. However, a tweet posted by Oluwole in which he addressed supporters of the Lib Dems and the Greens who were disappointed that he joined Labour by posting that if he were successful it would make their votes and their party's vote share actually count for the first time, therefore being beneficial to their party, was used by Labour as justification to remove him from the party on 24 March 2020.

Oluwole is also a campaigner for electoral reform and a member of the Make Votes Matter alliance for proportional representation (PR).

During the 2024 United Kingdom general election, Oluwole was barred from a Reform UK rally in Birmingham. Despite Oluwole showing his press pass, security guards at the venue said they "didn't know" why he was not allowed to attend the event.
