= For our Future's Sake =

- Abbreviation: FFS
- Formation: 2018
- Type: Campaign group
- Purpose: Youth and student-led campaign calling for a public vote on Brexit.
- Location: Millbank Tower, 21-24 Millbank, London, England, SW1P 4QP, UK
- Key people: Amanda Chetwynd-Cowieson; Richard Brooks; Jason Arthur
- Website: ffsakes.uk

For our Future's Sake (FFS) was a student-led pressure group supporting a referendum on the Brexit withdrawal agreement. It represented at least 60 Students’ Unions, and 980,000 students, across the UK.

== Background ==
FFS was launched at the National Union of Students' National Conference in 2018. Incumbent Deputy President Amatey Doku called for 'nationwide student-led mobilization to demand a people's vote' during his re-election speech, and delegates passed policy to 'campaign for a second referendum on the deal negotiated'.

In May 2018, the campaign launched its statement of intent in an open letter undersigned by 120 student leaders. The letter was featured in several British newspapers, and FFS spokespeople pledged a 'summer of action' involving demonstrations across the UK.

The campaign's style has been described as 'irreverent' and 'provocative', attracting a broad youth appeal through memes, videos and profanity.

== Activities ==
The organisation has held a number of direct-action demonstrations, including stunts at the Labour Live festival, outside Boris Johnson's residence, and at Parliament. The group also held numerous rallies and demonstrations across the UK during its 'summer of action', attracting over 160,000 attendees; this culminated with a march at Labour's National Conference. It gained endorsements from Dragons' Den star Deborah Meaden and YouTuber Dodie Clark, as well as several MPs. Members of the campaign have been featured on leading news networks, and in national print media and online.

FFS also works closely with Our Future Our Choice (OFOC), another young person's pro-EU advocacy group, collaborating on events like the number of "Parliament Takeovers" where a large group of young people visit Parliament's central lobby and meet with their local MPs.

The primary impact of the group is on the People's Vote campaign itself. Journalist Matthew D'Ancona described the influence of FFS as 'transformative', arguing that 'the public face of People's Vote changed fundamentally as the new network fizzed and buzzed and did its work. A campaign that had started life looking like the liberal elite demanding its job back morphed into a grassroots uprising of the young against their elders.'

== Membership ==
FFS supporters include sabbatical officers in 2018 from Students' Unions in Birmingham, Cambridge, Leeds, and Liverpool, as well as across Scotland, Wales and Northern Ireland.

=== Higher Education members ===
See List of Higher Education students' unions in the United Kingdom

==== Scotland ====
- Aberdeen University Students Union
- Highlands and Islands Students' Association
- Heriot-Watt University Students' Union
- St Andrews Students' Association
- Strathclyde Students' Union
- West Scotland Students' Association

==== England ====
- Bath Students' Union
- Bath Spa University Students' Union
- Birkbeck Students' Union
- University of Birmingham Guild of Students
- Cambridge University Graduate Union
- Cambridge University Students' Union
- Chester Students' Union
- Coventry Students' Union
- Edge Hill Students' Union
- Falmouth and Exeter Students' Union
- Gloucestershire Students' Union
- Hull University Union
- Keele Students' Union
- Kent University Union
- Lancaster University Students' Union
- Law Student Association
- Leeds University Union
- Leicester Students' Union
- Lincoln Students' Union
- Liverpool John Moore's Students' Union
- London Metropolitan Students' Union
- London South Bank Students' Union
- Middlesex Students' Union
- Nottingham Students' Union
- Northumbria Students' Union
- Norwich University of the Arts Students' Union
- Plymouth Students' Union
- Roehampton Students' Union
- Sheffield Hallam Students' Union
- Staffordshire Students' Union
- Surrey Students' Union
- Teesside University Students' Union
- West London Students' Union
- Westminster Students' Union
- Worcester Students' Union

==== Wales ====
- Aberystwyth Students' Union
- Swansea University Students' Union
- Trinity St Davids Students' Union

==== Northern Ireland ====
- Queen's University Belfast Students' Union
- Ulster University Students Union

=== Further Education members ===
- Ayrshire College Students' Union
- Bath College Students' Union
- Chichester College
- City of Liverpool College Students' Union
- Coleg Cambria
- Derby College
- Dudley College
- Exeter College
- Furness College
- Grŵp Llandrillo Menai
- Havant and South Downs College
- Newcastle Under Lyme College Students' Union

=== National affiliates ===
- National Union of Students
- Labour Students
- Young Greens
