= Keith Armstrong (author) =

English writer

Keith Armstrong is an author and poet from Newcastle upon Tyne.

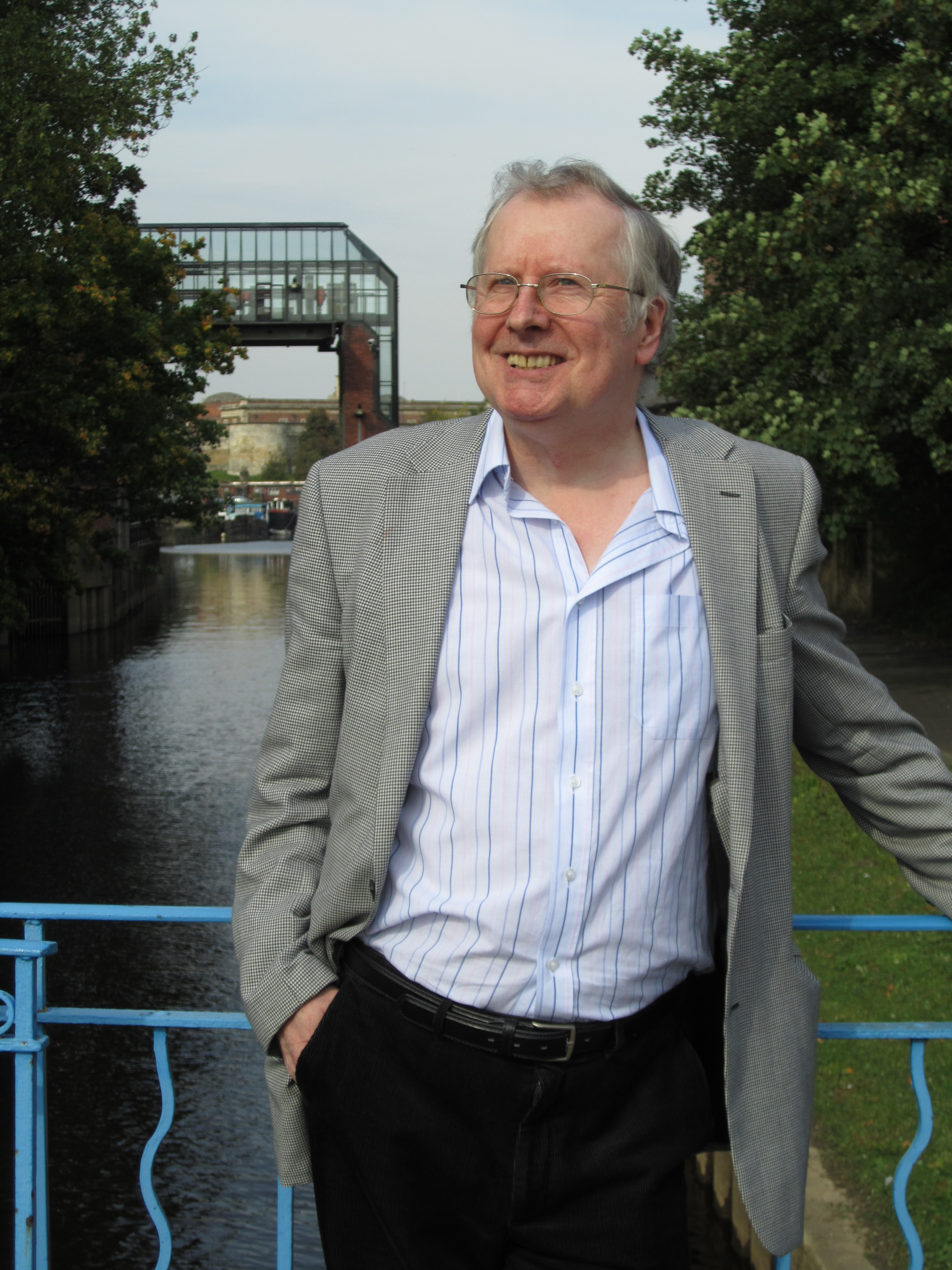
The Jingling Geordie – poet and raconteur

== Overview ==
Keith Armstrong is a writer from Tyneside. He was born at home in Danby Gardens, Heaton, Newcastle upon Tyne. His varied career has embraced community development worker, poet, librarian and publisher. Between 1980 and 1986 he held the post of Community Arts Development Worker with Peterlee Community Arts (later East Durham Community Arts). In recent years home has been the seaside town of Whitley Bay. He is coordinator of Northern Voices Community Projects which specialises in creative writing and community publishing. Over the years various community arts festivals in the region and many literary events have been organised. He has compiled and edited books on the Durham Miners' Gala, on the former mining communities of County Durham, the market town of Hexham and on North Tyneside heritage in From Segedunum to Spanish City. The latter in 2007 was one of the projects generated through Northern Voices Community Projects at Whitley Bay.

Keith's poetry has been extensively published in magazines as well as in collections and on radio & TV. He has also written for music-theatre productions. He has performed his poetry on several occasions at the Edinburgh Fringe Festival and at Festivals in Bradford, Cardiff, Cheltenham, Durham, Newcastle upon Tyne, Greenwich, Lancaster.

As an industrial librarian, he was christened 'Arts & Darts', organising poetry readings, theatrical productions, and art exhibitions by his fellow workers, as well as launching Ostrich poetry magazine using the firm's copying facilities and arranging darts matches between departments!

He has been a self-employed writer since 1986 and in 2007 he was awarded a PhD, on the work of Newcastle writer Jack Common, at the University of Durham from where he also received a BA Honours Degree in Sociology in 1995 and master's degree in 1998 for his studies on regional culture in the North East of England. He has held many residencies in the North East, including Hexham Racecourse as part of Year of the Artist in 2000 and at The Grand Hotel Tynemouth in 2010.

Keith has long pioneered cultural exchanges with Durham's twinning partners, particularly Tübingen and Nordenham in Germany and Ivry-sur-Seine and Amiens in France, as well as with Newcastle's Dutch twin-city of Groningen. He enjoys mixing travel and work with folk-musicians from North East England. A key collaborator has been Gary Miller and Armstrong wrote the lyrics for a 1995 album called Bleeding Sketches, by folk-rock band The Whisky Priests, with whom he has toured extensively in The Netherlands. This association dates back to November 1989 and has been well charted. Another Armstrong/Miller collaboration in 2003 remembered the Hexham Riot of 1761.

Keith has edited and published a book to celebrate the centenary of Spanish City, Whitley Bay. This is a notable piece of architecture being an early example of Hennebique concrete construction from 1910.

Recognition of his contribution to culture has come in Durham University establishing a Keith Armstrong collection.

== Selected commentators & reviewers comments ==
'Our latterday Thomas Spence.' (John Charlton, North East History)

'No one in the North East has written and read and encouraged and organised so consistently and over so long a period as Keith Armstrong. His poetry is different, original, and politically exhilarating.' (Andy Croft, Smokestack Books)

‘There are those who tell the terrible truth in all its loveliness. Keith Armstrong is one of them, a fine poet who refuses to turn his back on the wretched of the Earth. He is one of the best and I hope his voice will be heard more and more widely.' (Adrian Mitchell, Poet)

'Keith's poems raised goose pimples but also thoughts about today's culture.' (Peter Lewis, Hexham Courant)

'Keith is a noted Geordie wordsmith, a bloke whose musings were always radical, though of their place.' (Folk Roots magazine)

'An absolute must for anyone seeking a bit more than meaningless lyrics and musical nihilism.' (Charmaine O'Reilly, in 'The Edge' speaking of Bleeding Sketches)

== Selected bibliography ==
- Common Words & the Wandering Star: Jack Common (1903–1968), Keith Armstrong, University of Sunderland Press 2009.
- The Big Meeting: Peoples View of the Durham Miners' Gala, Keith Armstrong, TUPS, Newcastle 1994.
- The Grit and the Glory: The Footballing Traditions of Wear Valley in the Words of Local People by Keith Armstrong (ed), 1989.
- From Segedunum to Spanish City by Keith Armstrong and Peter Dixon, Northern Voices Community Projects, Whitley Bay, 2010.
- The Month of the Asparagus: Selected Poems by Keith Armstrong, Ward Wood Publishing, London 2011.
- Splinters: Poems by Keith Armstrong, Hill Salad Books (Breviary Stuff Publications), London 2011.
- Pains of Class, Keith Armstrong, Artery Publications, London 1982.
- Dreaming North (book and LP), Keith Armstrong, Portcullis Press, Gateshead Libraries 1986.
- The Jingling Geordie: Selected Poems 1970–1990, Keith Armstrong, The Common Trust Rookbook Publications, Edinburgh 1990.
- Our Village. Memories of the Durham Mining Communities, Keith Armstrong, The People's History, Durham 2000.
- Bless'd Millennium: The Life and Work of Thomas Spence, Keith Armstrong, Northern Voices, Whitley Bay 2000.
- The Town of Old Hexham, Keith Armstrong, The People's History, Durham 2002.
- Imagined Corners, Keith Armstrong, Smokestack Books, Middlesbrough 2004.
- Wallington Morning, Keith Armstrong, Wild Boar Books, Lincoln 2017.
