= David Pollard (author) =

British writer (born 1942)

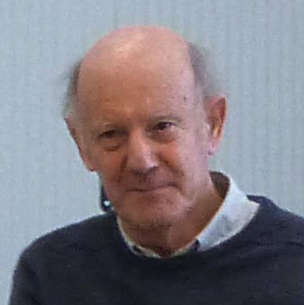
- Pollard in 2018
- Born: 2 July 1942 (age 84); London, England
- Education: University of Sussex
- Occupations: Poet, critic
- Website: www.davidpollard.net

David Pollard (born 2 July 1942, London) is a British writer.

== Biography ==
Pollard was born during the Blitz in 1942 and brought up a Londoner.

After working in the furniture trade and serving his articles in accountancy, he escaped to the University of Sussex where he was given his three degrees in English Literature, the History of Ideas, and Philosophy. The last of these, a doctorate, was awarded on his fortieth birthday and was published as 'The Poetry of Keats: Language and Experience' and is a Heideggerian approach to the poet. Heidegger's late critiques of the German poets Hölderlin, Mörike and Rilke are applied here for the first time to an English poet.

Pollard has worked at the Universities of Essex and Sussex and spent a year at the Hebrew University of Jerusalem as a Lady Davis Scholar.

He edited the KWIC Concordance to Keats' Letters based on the Rider K. Rollins edition published by the Harvard University Press. He has also published on Blake and Nietzsche, including a novel, Nietzsche's Footfalls, a meditation on the philosopher and his times, his relation to his sister and Nazism and especially to Wagner.

Pollard has published five volumes of poetry: patricides, Risk of Skin, Self-Portraits, bedbound, and Finis-terre.

He is working on a book about self-portraits and a text on Shakespeare which he considers a lifelong task.

== Publications ==
- The Poetry of Keats: Language and Experience (Harvester Press and Barnes & Noble, 1984)
- A KWIC Concordance to the Harvard Edition of the Letters of John Keats (Geraldson Imprints, 1993)
- Nietzsche's Footfalls (Geraldson Imprints and Kindle, 2001)
- Waterloo Sampler No 4 (Waterloo Press, 2004)
- patricides (Waterloo Press and Leanpub, 2006
- bedbound (Perdika Press and Leanpub, 2011)
- Risk of Skin (Waterloo Press and Leanpub, 2011)
- Self-Portraits (Waterloo Press, 2013)
- The Metamorphoses of Titus (Leanpub, 2013)
- Finis-terre (Agenda Editions, 2015)
- Three Artists (Lapwing Publications, 2018)
- "Self-annihilation and Self-overcoming: Blake and Nietzsche", in David Farrell Krell and David Wood, Exceedingly Nietzsche (Warwick Studies in Philosophy and Literature, Routledge, 1998)
- "William Blake and the Book of Job", in Meira Perry-Lehmann, There Was a Man in the Land of Uz: William Blake's Illustrations to the Book of Job (The Israel Museum, Jerusalem, 1992)

== See also ==
- List of English poets
- List of people from London
