= Economic Advisory Committee =

2015–16 committee of the British Labour Party

The British Labour Party's Economic Advisory Committee was in 2015–16 a group of economists, described as experts on globalisation, inequality and innovation, convened by Shadow Chancellor John McDonnell and reporting to Labour Party Leader Jeremy Corbyn, announced on 27 September 2015 at the Labour Party Conference in Brighton, and intended to meet on a quarterly basis to discuss and develop ideas around the official economic strategy to be advocated by the Labour Party, but not to set policy. It has been described as a way to give the Shadow Chancellor defensive cover.

In June 2016 Piketty and Blanchflower left, and the remaining members of the Economic Advisory Committee announced they had decided to postpone any further meetings, in the wake of the resignation of numerous members of the Shadow Cabinet in protest over Jeremy Corbyn's leadership. Wren-Lewis cites the Labour leadership's acquiescence of Brexit as his reason for resigning from the Committee.

== Membership ==
The committee originally consisted of seven members, described by then BBC News Economics Editor Robert Peston as, "some of the world's most influential left-wing economists".

- David Blanchflower, Professor, Dartmouth College and former member of the Monetary Policy Committee, described by Channel 4 Economics Editor Paul Mason as a, "scourge of austerity". (resigned 28 June 2016 stating that Corbyn should step down)
- Mariana Mazzucato, Professor, University of Sussex, whose ideas on smart state direction through a national investment bank or sovereign wealth fund have impressed Vince Cable and Chi Onwurah.
- Anastasia Nesvetailova, Professor, City University London
- Thomas Piketty, Professor, Paris School of Economics (resigned 29 June 2016 due to time constraints)
- Ann Pettifor, Director, Policy Research in Macroeconomics (PRIME), a debt campaigner drawn from what Channel 4 Economics Editor Paul Mason describes as a “post” socialist think tank.
- Joseph Stiglitz, Professor, Columbia University and recipient of the 2001 Nobel Memorial Prize in Economic Sciences
- Simon Wren-Lewis, Professor, University of Oxford

The inclusion of Piketty and Stilgitz was seen as a particular coup for the Labour Party leadership due to their breakthrough success in mainstream publishing, while the absence of Richard Murphy, who had advised Corbyn on his cornerstone policy of People's Quantitative Easing was noted.

Following the formation of the committee, Economics Editors Robert Peston, then of BBC News, and Chris Giles, of the Financial Times, confirmed that the seven members were unified in their opposition to the spending cuts of Chancellor George Osborne, although the latter warned that they had less in common in other areas.

== History ==
=== Formation ===
Regarding the formation of the committee, its convener, John McDonnell later stated, as part of a series of public debates to present his Party's "New Economics", that the Economic Advisory Committee had initially been set up to conduct reviews into public institutions including HM Treasury, the Monetary Policy Committee and HM Revenue and Customs, and that it was due to the surprising number of people at the 2015 Labour Party Conference in Brighton who felt the Labour Party should be an anti-austerity party that the policy of anti-austerity was set. Committee member David Blanchflower, who confirmed he was undertaking an independent review of the Bank of England for the shadow chancellor, had however stated that opposition to austerity on its own was not enough and that it would take some time to produce a coherent new economic strategy that party members share.

The formation of the committee, according to Robert Peston, then BBC News Economics Editor, went some way to answering the common charge that Jeremy Corbyn and John McDonnell were "left-wing dinosaurs" and would ensure, "a properly emotional debate" between the Labour Party and the Conservative Party about, "how to maximise growth and prosperity". Peston went on to contend that this was the first time since Conservative Party Leader Margaret Thatcher had drawn upon the ideas of Milton Friedman and Friedrich Hayek, that a leading British political party had, "attempted to establish an economic ideology outside the mainstream". Chris Giles, The Financial Times Economics Editor, countered this claim by referencing relationships between former Labour Party Leaders and economists, such as Neil Kinnock with John Eatwell and Piero Sraffa, and Gordon Brown with Robert Reich and Richard B. Freeman, as well as Conservative Chancellor George Osborne with Alan Budd and Kenneth Rogoff. Although, as Peston concludes, none of these had formed a similar committee.

=== First meeting ===
The first meeting of the committee was convened at 2pm on 12 November 2015, at Labour Party’s Brewers Green headquarters, with Shadow Business Secretary Angela Eagle, Shadow Chief Secretary Seema Malhotra and the entire Shadow Treasury team in attendance. At the meeting, Simon Wren-Lewis spoke about fiscal policy, Mariana Mazzucato about strategic investment, and Ann Pettifor about the importance of a strong economic narrative. Although Anastasia Nesvetailova and David Blanchflower were also in attendance, the latter via Skype, neither of the two most high-profile members, Thomas Piketty and Joseph Stiglitz, were present at this initial meeting.

=== First "New Economics" Public Debates ===
On 26 January 2016, committee member Mariana Mazzucato, gave the first of the New Economics Tour, which had been announced by John McDonnell with the intention of broadening the political debate.

In January 2016, coinciding with the start of the party's series of public debates presenting their "New Economics", it was reported in the New Statesman that the committee had only met once and members had accused the party of having “stupid ideas” about economic policy. In the article which the report was based upon David Blanchflower, committee member and New Statesman economics editor, confirmed that although the committee had only met once the plan was to convene every quarter from then on and that the "silly stuff" he referred to was companies not being able to pay dividends if they don’t do certain things. Blanchflower, who admitted that it was early days and that the new Labour Party still did not have many economic policies to speak of, nonetheless confirmed that economists in the group were smart, left-leaning and credible, and that it was time to start thinking about how Labour could become a credible opposition.

=== Leadership crisis ===
Blanchflower quit the panel and said he would also wind up his review of the role of the Bank of England on 28 June 2016 following the mass resignations of the Shadow Cabinet, joining them in calling for Corbyn to step down. Piketty revealed that he had also left the panel in June, citing work commitments. He also criticised Labour's "very weak" referendum campaign to remain in the EU but said this was not a factor in his decision.

Some other members of the panel, including Mazzucato, Pettifor and Wren-Lewis issued a statement saying the panel had agreed to delay further meetings as a result of mass resignations over the leadership of Jeremy Corbyn. They also criticised the Labour leadership over the EU campaign, but said they saw their role as "providing advice to the Labour party as a whole, and not as an endorsement of particular individuals within" and would be "honoured" to serve the party in future after the leadership situation was resolved Simon Wren-Lewis later joined with Blanchflower endorsing Owen Smith over Corbyn for the leadership on 31 July 2016.

== Policies ==
=== People's Quantitative Easing ===
Shortly after the formation of the committee, Robert Peston contended that the composition of the panel signalled that People's Quantitative Easing, the policy of requiring the Bank of England to print money to finance government investment, which had up to that point been considered the cornerstone of Jeremy Corbyn's economic policy, was probably dead, as he felt that while this particular group of economists would, "back the notion of the government taking advantage of prevailing low interest rates to borrow considerably more for investment in infrastructure," they would not support the ultra formulation of the policy, "for fear that the anti-inflationary credentials of the Bank of England would be destroyed", and that if the policy survived it would be as, "a contingent rainy-day monetary tool, for when the economy is next in direst straits."

== See also ==
- David Blanchflower
- Ann Pettifor
