= Richard Murphy (tax campaigner) =

British accountant and tax campaigner (born 1958)

- Born: 12 March 1958 (age 68)
- Education: University of Southampton
- Occupations: Academic, accountant, journalist, and activist
- Known for: Tax activism
- Website: Tax Research

Richard James Murphy (born 12 March 1958) is a British former chartered accountant who campaigns on issues of tax avoidance and tax evasion. He advises the Trades Union Congress on taxation, and was one of the co-founders of the Tax Justice Network. He is a Professor Emeritus of Accounting Practice at University of Sheffield Management School. He runs the blog site "Funding the Future".

== Early life and education ==
Murphy was born in 1958 and brought up in Ipswich. His undergraduate degree was in Accountancy at the University of Southampton, and he trained further at KPMG becoming a Chartered Accountant.

== Career ==
For much of his early career Murphy was an accountant in Downham Market, Norfolk. In 1985 he co-founded an accountancy firm which became Murphy Deeks Nolan. The company was sold in 2000. Murphy was also the founder of a company that became the European distributor for the game Trivial Pursuit. Murphy has since admitted that the manufacturing operation he set up in Ireland to manufacture Trivial Pursuit was there to avoid UK taxation, something of which he is now ashamed and was a turning point in his career towards anti-tax avoidance campaigning.

Since 2003, Murphy has become more involved in economic and taxation policy issues. He was a co-founder of the Tax Justice Network. He is the director of Tax Research LLP. However, because Tax Research LLP is a Limited Liability Partnership he is technically the designated member rather than a director. The only other member of Tax Research LLP is Mrs Jacqueline Murphy. Murphy was named by International Tax Review as the seventh most significant person having influence on tax policy, practice and administration in 2013.

In 2009, Murphy lost a libel claim by Lord Ashcroft and associated businesses where he misunderstood an article posted on an unrelated website and published a blog post claiming that Lord Ashcroft's Belize bank provided "tax evasion services". In 2021, Murphy was appointed Professor of Accounting Practice at the University of Sheffield Management School, a position from which he retired and was given the title emeritus in July 2025. Previously he had been a Professor of Practice in International Political Economy in the Department of International Politics at City University London. He had also been a visiting fellow at University of Portsmouth Business School, the Centre for Global Political Economy at the University of Sussex, and at the Tax Research Institute at the University of Nottingham.

Murphy was the founder of the Fair Tax Mark; he resigned out of unhappiness with a proposal that it adopt an international standard. On 28 March 2024, he resigned as a Fellow of the Institute of Chartered Accountants in England and Wales. On 26 November 2024, he announced he would retire from Sheffield University Management School as of February 2025.

== Public policy ==
Murphy is an advocate of Modern Monetary Theory. He thinks it could be applied to, but is not essential for, a Green New Deal.

=== Tax ===
Murphy is a promoter of financial reform, with specific emphasis given to tax avoidance and evasion. He estimates that "£25 billion is lost annually from tax avoidance". That is substantially larger than HM Revenue and Customs' estimate of £2.7 billion, and his estimate has been dismissed by HMRC. Murphy claims that HMRC insiders have suggested to him that £300 million additional investment in the department could recoup £8 billion in unpaid tax. His methodology has been criticised by other groups, including the Oxford University Centre for Business Taxation in their December 2012 publication The Tax Gap for Corporation Tax, and the Institute for Fiscal Studies, which cited his estimate of the corporate tax gap for the TUC as one which was "likely overstated (possibly by a wide margin)".

Murphy advocates "country by country reporting", as a means to increase financial transparency to reduce tax avoidance and evasion. In 2013, the OECD and G8 endorsed a form of country-by-country reporting. Murphy is in favour of a land value tax, which would tax land based only on its value, and not on the buildings on it, in order to discourage land hoarding and promote building in areas in need of more housing. It is also very difficult to evade. He has written in favour of removing high-denomination notes such as the £50 note as they are used widely for tax evasion, saying "there is not a shadow of a doubt that vast amounts of cash" are used for illegal purposes.

=== Involvement in "Corbynomics" ===
In August 2015, many of Murphy's ideas were taken up as proposed policies by Jeremy Corbyn in the Labour Party leadership election. Corbyn was elected and became Leader of the Labour Party and Leader of the Opposition. His economic policies were dubbed "Corbynomics". This included a policy called People's Quantitative Easing. - a broader development of a policy Murphy launched in 2010, called Green Quantitative Easing. Corbyn also cited Murphy's estimate of there being £120 billion of missing tax revenue as part of the economic plan issued during his election campaign stating that this was enough to "double the NHS budget". In addition, Corbyn adopted several of the remedies that Murphy has advocated (including country-by-country reporting) to address this revenue gap. Murphy later clarified that in his view not all of the missing revenue was "recoverable", and that "at best" £20 billion of it could be collected. Murphy was notably not part of Labour's Economic Advisory Committee, which was set up after the leadership election in September 2015.

Murphy was an informal adviser to Corbyn, although it is reported that he had hoped to have a position on the Labour Party Treasury Team. Murphy said in June 2016 that those demanding a change in the Labour leadership were correct, "even if I will not agree with much of their reasoning". Corbyn had "not provided a vision of what his leadership will deliver", and concerning Labour's economic policies: "we have so far heard almost nothing that really progresses the ideas outlined last summer". A few weeks later, Murphy criticised Corbyn's track record further writing "there was no policy direction, no messaging, no direction, no co-ordination, no nothing". In a response to a question raised in the House of Commons, Labour's Shadow Chancellor John McDonnell stated with regard to Murphy "He is not the economic adviser and never has been, because we doubted his judgment, unfortunately. He is a tax accountant, not an adviser. He is actually excellent on tax evasion and tax avoidance, but he leaves a lot to be desired on macroeconomic policy".

=== Scotland ===
Murphy is a vocal critic of Government Expenditure and Revenue Scotland as a report on the state of the Scottish economy. Murphy stated, "Revenue Scotland is still struggling to work out which people are tax resident in Scotland and it has no clue at all on what corporation tax, VAT or other taxes are due, precisely because no-one has to declare those taxes separately for Scotland. It’s the same with imports and exports: no-one knows what these are because there are no border posts at Carlisle, Berwick-on-Tweed or Stranraer. On investment and savings, we’re equally clueless." He added, "25 of the 26 income figures in a set of accounts are estimates extrapolated from data for the UK as a whole and some consumer surveys." At a subsequent appearance before the Holyrood, Finance and Constitution Committee, Murphy was however criticised for being unable to justify some of these claims.

== Media commentary ==
Murphy periodically wrote for The Guardian from 2001 to 2018. In 2001, Murphy wrote an article in The Observer recommending that parents set up a personal service company for their nanny, as an alternative to illegal cash-in-hand payments, to avoid income tax and national-insurance contributions. Murphy has been described by the Daily Mirror journalist Kevin Maguire as an "heroic figure", and The Guardian journalist Polly Toynbee has called him a "tireless campaigner". He currently writes a weekly opinion column for the Scottish newspaper, The National.

== Blog and YouTube channel ==
Richard Murphy

YouTube information
- Channel: Richard J Murphy
- Years active: 2020–present
- Subscribers: 390,000
- Views: 57.6 million
- Last updated: 1 November 2026

Murphy runs a blog, Funding the Future (formerly Tax Research UK) and a YouTube channel Richard J Murphy, which as of November 2026 had 390k subscribers and 57,613,704 views.

== Personal life ==
Murphy is a Quaker. He lives with his wife, who is a general practitioner, and their two children in Downham Market.

== Publications ==
=== Books ===
- Murphy, Richard (2015). The Joy of Tax. Bantam Press. ISBN 978-0593075173.
- Murphy, Richard (2013). Over Here and Undertaxed: Multinationals, Tax Avoidance and You. Vintage Digital.
- Murphy, Richard (2011). The Courageous State. Searching Finance. ISBN 978-1-907720-28-4.
- Palan, Ronen; Murphy, Richard; Chavagneux, Christian (2009). Tax Havens: How Globalization Really Works. Cornell University Press. ISBN 978-0-8014-7612-9.

=== Reports ===
- Murphy, Richard (2008). A Green New Deal (PDF) (Report). New Economics Foundation.
- Murphy, Richard (2007). Why is Country-by-Country financial reporting by Multinational Companies so important? (PDF) (Report). Tax Research LLP.
- Murphy, Richard (2004). Location, location – Campaigner Richard Murphy proposes a radical new International Accounting Standard that would require reporting turnover and tax by location (PDF) (Report). accountancymagazine.com.
- Murphy, Richard (2024), Taxing Wealth Report 2024 - International Tax Campaigner Richard Murphy demonstrates simple tax changes to raise over £90bn from the wealthy https://taxingwealth.uk/

== See also ==
- A Green New Deal
- Richard Brooks (journalist)
- Corporate tax haven
- Robin Hood tax
- Tax haven
