= Planet on Fire =

2021 book by Mathew Lawrence and Laurie Laybourn-Langton

Planet on Fire: A Manifesto for the Age of Environmental Breakdown
- Author: Mathew Lawrence, Laurie Laybourn-Leighton
- Publisher: Verso Books
- Publication date: 2021
- Pages: 280
- ISBN: 978-1-78873-877-4
- Dewey Decimal: 333.72

Planet on Fire: A Manifesto for the Age of Environmental Breakdown is a book authored by Mathew Lawrence and Laurie Laybourn-Langton. It was published in 2021 by Verso Books and focuses on the climate crisis and the economy, advocating in favor of ecosocialism.

== Background ==
At the time of the book's publication, both authors worked for think tanks, with Mathew Lawrence at Common Wealth and Laurie Laybourn-Langton at the Institute for Public Policy Research.

== Summary ==
Planet on Fire advocates for environmentalist movements to move toward ecosocialist politics.

A self-described "radical manifesto for how to deal with environmental breakdown," Planet on Fire offers challenges to the political status quo in the face of the "devastating and inequitably distributed consequences of the climate emergency."

It offers a roadmap for a "democratic and sustainable future." Laurie Laybourn-Langton and Mathew Lawrence argue that it is necessary to restructure the economy to create a way of life that can produces a healthy and flourishing environment for all.

== Reception ==
Writing in the New Statesman, senior online editor George Eaton described Planet on Fire as offering "an urgent alternative" to the "broken model" driving a rapid rise in carbon emissions. A review in Jacobin by writer and climate activist Sam Knights described the book as "an essential vision of the future".

On the website of the Department of International Development at the London School of Economics, environmental policy researcher Flora Parkin characterized Planet on Fire as "credible, vital, and honest". She wrote that the book "encourages the reader to reimagine an economy that can foster a healthy and flourishing environment for all"; she noted that the authors' analysis uses "a dual approach", emphasizing the possibility for institutions to be created and abolished through law and politics while simultaneously arguing that economics should be reconnected to "nature, social relationships and fairness".

A June 2021 list of the "Top 10 books for a greener economy" assembled by Ann Pettifor for The Guardian included Planet on Fire as the tenth book. Pettifor wrote that the book "helps to unpick how the climate crisis relates to the other pressing challenges that we currently face" and that the authors "offer some worthwhile answers".
