= Green Deal =

Green Deal may refer to:

- European Green Deal, set of policy initiatives brought forward by the European Commission with the overarching aim of making Europe climate neutral in 2050
- Green New Deal, proposed package of United States legislation that aims to address climate change and economic inequality
- A Green New Deal, report released in the United Kingdom on 21 July 2008 by the Green New Deal Group and published by the New Economics Foundation, which outlines a series of policy proposals to tackle global warming, the current financial crisis, and peak oil
- The Green Deal, UK government policy initiative that gave homeowners, landlords and tenants the opportunity to pay for energy efficient home improvements through the savings on their energy bills
