= Unhitched (book) =

Book by Richard Seymour

- First edition
- Author: Richard Seymour
- Language: English
- Publisher: Verso Books
- Publication date: 2013

Unhitched: The Trial of Christopher Hitchens is a 2013 book about Christopher Hitchens by the British writer Richard Seymour. The book focuses on Hitchens's work on religion, his engagement with British politics and his alleged embrace of American imperialism. In January 2013, Seymour said of Unhitched, "It is written in the spirit of a trial ... I do attempt to get a sense of the complexity and gifts of the man, but it is very clearly a prosecution, and you can guess my conclusion."

== Overview ==
Seymour assesses Hitchens' conversion from an opponent of neoconservatism to an Iraq War hawk, observing that he belongs to a "recognizable type: a left-wing defector with a soft spot for empire". For Seymour, Hitchens' conversion was the result of a perception of religion as a global force for evil and an accompanying sense that American imperialism could be a force for good. However, Seymour also traces the origins of Hitchens' neoconservatism to his earlier support for causes such as that of the British government in the Falklands War and his view that the Roman conquest of Britain constituted "a huge advance" in the development of the region. Seymour also considers Hitchens' reversal on the Bosnian War, his call for humanitarian intervention at the end of the Gulf War, his reverence for Rudyard Kipling and George Orwell, and his defence of the Tunisian government in 2007.

== Critical reception ==
Unhitched received a mixed reception from critics, several of whom, such as James Kirchick, had been friends and colleagues of Hitchens. Gregory Shupak, writing for In These Times, a left-wing magazine, argued that Seymour, with his "gift for reeling off an entire firing squad's worth of bullets in a single sentence" was also "plainly a caliber of intellectual that his subject is not." In a similar vein, Doug Enaa Greene of Links International Journal of Socialist Renewal characterised Unhitched as "a well-argued, concise and powerful brief that can leave no doubt that Hitchens is guilty."

The review of Unhitched in The Daily Telegraph argued that the book's contentions were "all perfectly to the point", and that the book was "well-argued", but due to its orthodox left-wing perspective omitted some potentially interesting lines of inquiry such as the possible influence of Hitchens's youthful bisexuality on his depictions of Gulf War soldiers. The book was forcefully denounced by Fred Inglis in The Independent, however, as "sectarian and mean-spirited". Colin Woodard of The Washington Post, meanwhile, described Seymour as an "over-zealous prosecutor" who "insists on advancing his argument from solid ground onto very thin ice." George Eaton of the New Statesman described the book as a "hatchet job," criticising its "embittered, polemical" and biased tone and its "tediously inflated" prose. Writing for Newsweek, an article titled "A Nasty Piece of Work" by James Kirchick described Unhitched as a "tawdry new book" that, among other things, included unsubstantiated claims of plagiarism and unfounded personal attacks. Seymour responded by saying that Kirchick's review "was the most deliciously splenetic fanboy tribute to unreasoning hysteria that it has ever been my pleasure to gloat about" in a piece for his blog that was subsequently reposted by Salon.

Reviewing the book for the Irish magazine Red Banner, writer Kevin Higgins noted Seymour "lands many heavy punches" on Hitchens' reputation, and that "Unhitched is well written, if a little verbose in places". Higgins agreed with some of Seymour's criticisms of Hitchens, arguing when Hitchens "was wrong, he was very, very wrong", singling out as an example Hitchens' defence of the Bush administration's handling of the Hurricane Katrina disaster. However, Higgins also took issue with Seymour using former members of the Socialist Workers Party (UK) as sources, pointing out that though Seymour had left the SWP since he wrote Unhitched, he had been "happy to quote as reliable witnesses people whose word he clearly...no longer accepts as gospel". Higgins also stated that Seymour was wrong to criticise Hitchens for not having a detailed political program, arguing Hitchens "was never a writer of manifestos" but rather an iconoclastic journalist.
