= Corbyn: The Strange Rebirth of Radical Politics =

2016 book by Richard Seymour

- Author: Richard Seymour
- Language: English
- Published: London
- Publisher: Verso Books
- Publication date: July 2016
- Publication place: United Kingdom
- Pages: 256
- ISBN: 978-1-78478-531-4

Corbyn: The Strange Rebirth of Radical Politics is a 2016 book by Irish writer Richard Seymour, published by Verso Books. The book examines the political conditions which contributed to the rise of UK opposition leader Jeremy Corbyn during 2015 Labour leadership election, and attempts to predict the future of Corbyn, the Labour Party, and leftist politics in coming years.

== Synopsis ==
Seymour draws on Marxist and Gramscian theory to examine the broader political context surrounding Jeremy Corbyn's unlikely election as leader of the UK Labour Party in 2015. The book recounts the events of the election as well as the organizing methods and media strategies developed by the Corbyn campaign. It explores the significance and challenges posed by his win for the future development of Labour, democratic politics, and broader left-wing movements, and sets Corbynism against the past political strategies of New Labour, Blairism, and establishment media channels.

Corbyn was released in July 2016, coinciding with the announcement of the 2016 Labour leadership challenge.

== Reception ==
The book received positive critical reception. Liam Young of the New Statesman called it "the fullest and fairest account of Jeremy Corbyn’s rise released to date," adding that "It would be wrong to suggest that it is a positive, self-fulfilling account of Corbyn’s rise. In many ways it is a hard hitting and realistic look at what lies ahead." Tom Mills of Ceasefire called it "an analysis – and an astute one – of the socio-political conditions which have given rise to Corbynism, its future prospects and the substantial obstacles it will inevitably face." Journalist Laurie Penny wrote that "Seymour is an essential voice on the left, and this book is a necessary intervention, explaining this daunting political moment and bringing the focus back to strategy." Author Corey Robin wrote that "you'll find here the most sophisticated diagnosis of why men and women across the globe are turning to the left and why their aspirations are so continuously being frustrated." Douglas Beat of Camden Review wrote that "for anyone with an interest in Labour, inside the party or not, Seymour has written a serious, thoughtful, necessary and timely work."
