= David Blanchflower =

British-American labour economist and academic

David Blanchflower CBE

Member of the Monetary Policy Committee of the Bank of England
- In office June 2006 – May 2009
- Governor: Mervyn King

Personal details
- Born: 2 March 1952 (age 74)
- Education: University of Leicester; University of Birmingham; University of Wales; Queen Mary, University of London
- Profession: Economist

David Graham Blanchflower, CBE (born 2 March 1952), sometimes called Danny Blanchflower, is a British-American labour economist and academic. He is currently a tenured economics professor at Dartmouth College, Hanover, New Hampshire. He is also a research associate at the National Bureau of Economic Research, part-time professor at the University of Glasgow and a Bloomberg TV contributing editor. He was an external member of the Bank of England's interest rate-setting Monetary Policy Committee (MPC) from June 2006 to June 2009.

British-born, Blanchflower is now both a British and an American citizen, having moved to the United States in 1989. He was appointed Commander of the Order of the British Empire (CBE) in the 2009 Birthday Honours.

== Education ==
Blanchflower attended Varndean Grammar School for Boys in Brighton and Cantonian High School in Cardiff. He went on to earn a B.A. in Social Sciences (Economics) at the University of Leicester in 1973 and a Postgraduate Certificate in Education at the University of Birmingham in 1975. He received an MSc (Economics) at the University of Wales in 1981 and his PhD in 1985 at Queen Mary, University of London.

== Work in economics ==
Blanchflower served as a Research Officer at the Institute for Employment Research at University of Warwick from 1984 to 1986, when he became a lecturer at the Department of Economics at the University of Surrey, a post he held until 1989 when he moved to the United States.

He has been a member of the editorial board of Small Business Economics, Scottish Journal of Political Economy, and Industrial and Labor Relations Review.

He has also been a research associate at the Centre for Economic Performance at the London School of Economics and at the Canadian International Labour Network.

=== The Wage Curve ===
Blanchflower's The Wage Curve (with Andrew Oswald), with eight years of data from 4 million people in 16 countries, argued that the wage curve, which plots wages against unemployment, is negatively sloping, reversing generations of macroeconomic theory. "The Phillips Curve is wrong, it's as fundamental as that," said Blanchflower. The Guardian praised the findings as "one of the most devastating findings of contemporary economics". The implications, that wages are highest when unemployment is lowest and that increased unemployment drives down wages, have been suggested periodically in economics since the publication of Karl Marx's Wage-Labour and Capital.

=== Happiness ===
Much of Blanchflower's work has focused on the economics of happiness. He has posited a correlation between age and happiness, declining through the 20s, 30s, and 40s before increasing in retirement. He has been labelled a "happiness guru" for his ability to quantify the increase in happiness for individuals who are married or have sex frequently, work which has applications in divorce law and pharmaceutical advertising.

He has been interviewed several times on NPR and New Hampshire Public Radio about his work in this area.

=== Monetary Policy Committee ===
Blanchflower joined the Bank of England's Monetary Policy Committee in June 2006, replacing Stephen Nickell. Before his appointment, Michael Fallon questioned his non-residency at the parliamentary Select committee on Treasury. Blanchflower attended a number of meetings by conference call. During his tenure, he voted in the minority in eighteen of thirty six meetings. He voted to maintain the interest rate in his first nine meetings, but to reduce interest rates in March 2007 and in every meeting from October 2007 through March 2009.

Six other members of the MPC have served during Blanchflower's time on the MPC. Blanchflower continually voted for rate cuts. At the September 2008 MPC meeting, Blanchflower distanced himself further from consensus by voting for a 0.5% 'cut' against the other eight members' 'hold'.

In the Autumn of 2008, the worldwide economic situation began to deteriorate dramatically, most clearly evidenced by dramatic falls in the values of shares worldwide. On 8 October 2008, the BOE took part in a set of simultaneously announced cuts in the policy rate of a number of major Central Banks. The MPC eventually came around to Blanchflower's view and subsequently lowered rates to levels never before seen in the Bank of England's existence and moved to do unprecedented levels of quantitative easing.

In March 2009, it was announced that Blanchflower would be replaced by David Miles at the end of his term, 31 May 2009.

=== The "economics of walking about" ===
He also emphasised the importance of what he called the "economics of walking about"; that is, the use of empirical data such as social surveys.

== Current work ==
David Blanchflower is the Bruce V Rauner professor of economics at Dartmouth College, New Hampshire, part-time professor at the University of Stirling, a research associate at the National Bureau of Economic Research, and a contributing editor for Bloomberg TV. On 27 September 2015, it was announced that he had been appointed to the British Labour Party's Economic Advisory Committee, convened by the then Shadow Chancellor John McDonnell and reporting to the then Labour Party Leader Jeremy Corbyn, for whom he is undertaking an independent review of the Bank of England, although he has stated that he is not a Corbyn supporter and has never spoken to him. Blanchflower quit the panel and said he would also wind up his review of the role of the Bank of England on 28 June 2016 following the mass resignations of the Shadow Cabinet, joining them in calling for Corbyn to step down.

== Personal life ==
Blanchflower and his then wife were parties in the notable case of Blanchflower v. Blanchflower. The case resulted in a landmark decision by the New Hampshire Supreme Court which ruled that sexual relations between two females, one of whom is married, does not constitute adultery because it is not technically sexual intercourse. The case was overturned in April 2021 by the NH Supreme Court in the case of Blaisdell v Blaisdell.

In 2024, Blanchflower signed a faculty letter expressing support for the actions of Dartmouth College president Sian Beilock, who ordered the arrests of 90 students and faculty members nonviolently protesting the Gaza war.

== Publications ==
Papers since 2021 all with Alex Bryson

- 'The adult consequences on wellbeing of abuse and neglect in childhood', International Journal of Wellbeing, forthcoming.
- 'The gender well-being gap,' Social Indicators Research, forthcoming.
- 'The female happiness paradox', The Journal of Population Economics, 2024.
- With Jackson Spurling, 'The wage curve after the Great Recession', Economica, 2024.
- 'The adult consequences of being bullied in childhood', Social Science and Medicine, 2024.
- 'Well-being rankings', Social Indicators Research, 2023.
- 'Recession and deflation', The Review of Keynesian Economics, 2023.
- 'Seasonality and the female happiness paradox', Quality and Quantity, 2023.
- 'Long Covid in the United States', Plos One, 2023.
- 'Chronic pain: Evidence from the National Child Development Study', Plos One, 2022
- 'Union membership and job satisfaction over the life course, Industrial Relations Journal, 2022.
- 'Taking the pulse of nations: a biometric measure of well-being', Economics and Human Biology, 2022.
- 'The economics of walking about and predicting unemployment in the USA', National Institute Economic Review, 2022.
- 'Covid and mental health in America', Plos One, 2022.
- 'Further decoding the mystery of American pain: the importance of work', Plos One, 2022.
- 'The Sahm Rule and predicting the Great Recession across OECD countries', National Institute Economic Review, 2022.
- 'The economics of walking about and predicting US downturns', National Institute Economic Review, 2022.
- 'Unemployment and Sleep: Evidence from the United States and Europe', Economics and Human Biology, 2021.
- 'Union membership peaks in midlife', British Journal of Industrial Relations. 2021.
