= Wage curve =

Economic relationship

The wage curve is the negative relationship between the levels of unemployment and wages that arises when these variables are expressed in local terms. According to David Blanchflower and Andrew Oswald (1994, p. 5), the wage curve summarizes the fact that "A worker who is employed in an area of high unemployment earns less than an identical individual who works in a region with low joblessness."

== Explanation ==
One way to understand the wage curve is as follows. The labour supply of each individual is positively correlated to wages, therefore the higher is the hourly wage offered, the more hours an individual is willing to work. However, there is a limit to which every person would be willing to sacrifice an hour of leisure or rest, for an hour's worth of wages. Let's say that X is the maximum number of hours a person can work, and $A is the minimum hourly wage rate he expects in return. Any wage $B, greater than $A, will increase the worker's daily wage without increasing the hours of work. So if you need more hours of work than X, you need to hire more people.

Say you need to purchase Y hours of labour from the labour market. Let us assume that Y = 4X. This means that Y is four times as much as one labourer's maximum labour offer. If you pay $A an hour then you can hire 4 labourers to work for X hours each. However, depending on the labour market conditions, other options are open:

Say that there are not very many jobs in the labour market, unemployment is high and a lot of people are under-employed (working much fewer than X hours). In this situation the going rate is likely to be lower than $A as it is very unlikely that an employee would be asked to work for X hours. You would save money by hiring more than 4 labourers with each of them working fewer than X hours.

Say the labour market is tight and most people are already working X hours a day. It is very hard to find people who are not already earning $A an hour, and because of that you must match the money offer elsewhere in order to get someone to work for you. The wage level in this scenario would be higher than the earlier scenario.

In short, the lower unemployment is and the fewer laborers there are available, the higher the wages. The contrary is true when unemployment is high. This is the essence of the wage curve.

== See also ==
- Phillips curve
