= Andrew Oswald =

British economist and academic

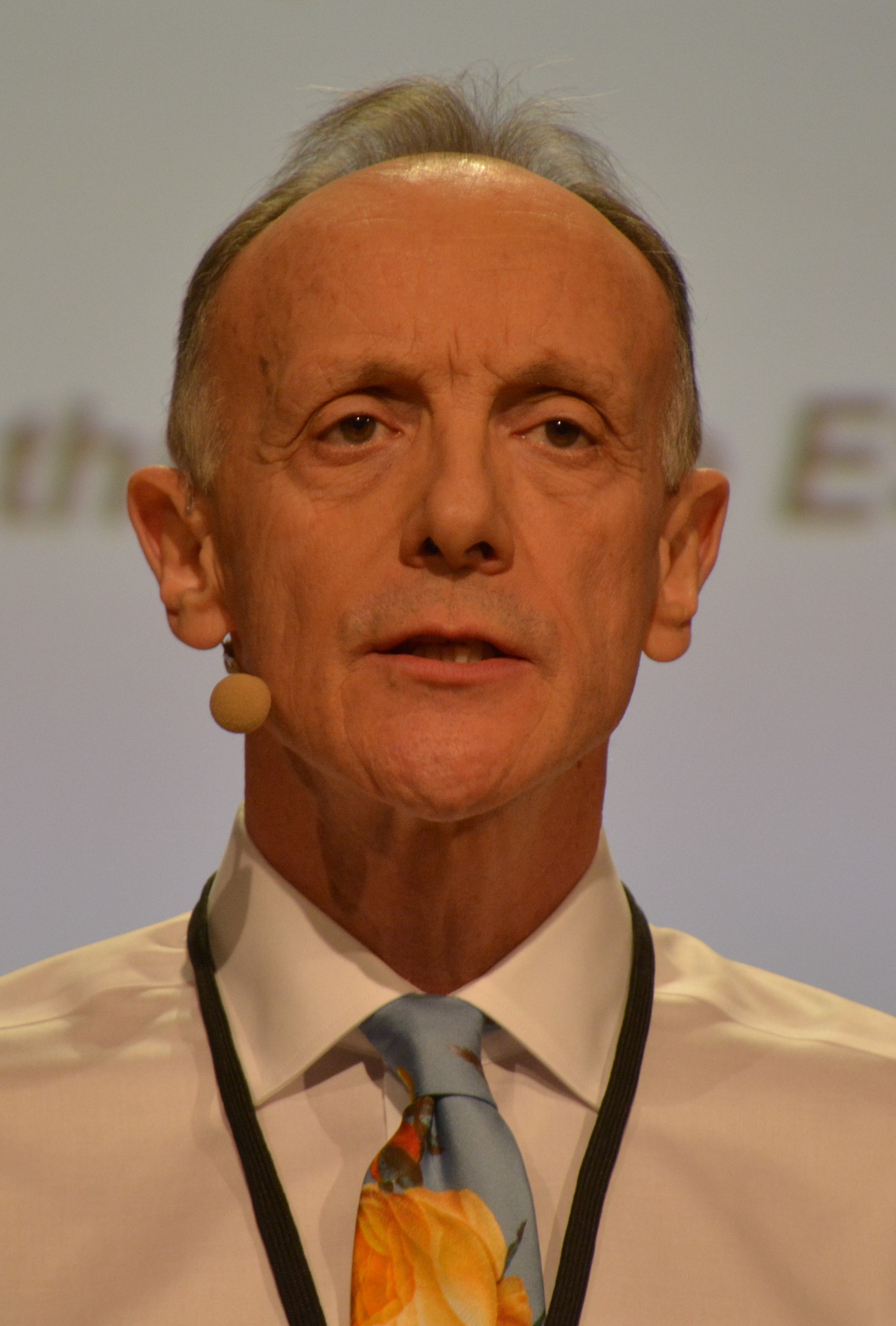
Andrew Oswald

Andrew Oswald (born 1953) is a Professor of Economics and Behavioural Science at the University of Warwick, England. He is an ISI highly cited researcher and has been a professorial fellow of the ESRC. He is currently a member of the board of reviewing editors of Science. He held previous posts at Oxford, the London School of Economics, Princeton, Dartmouth and Harvard. Andrew Oswald serves as the chair of the IZA Institute Network Advisory Group.

== Career ==
Oswald went to high school mainly in Perth in Western Australia and in Currie, Edinburgh, Scotland. He holds degrees from the University of Stirling, the University of Strathclyde, and the University of Oxford. He was a lecturer at the University of Oxford in 1983, at Princeton University from 1983 to 1984, at the London School of Economics from 1984 to 1989, and at Dartmouth College from 1989 to 1991, where he was also DeWalt Ankeny Professor of Economics.

Oswald has been a Professor of Economics at Warwick University since 1996.

Oswald was awarded Princeton University's Richard A. Lester prize alongside David Blanchflower in 1994 for The Wage Curve. In 1996, he was awarded the Medal of the University of Helsinki.

Oswald was a member of the Commission on the Measurement of Economic Performance and Social Progress.

== Academic interests ==
Andrew Oswald lists his research areas as Applied Economics and Quantitative Social Science. His main research has been on the economic and social determinants of human wellbeing, happiness and mental health.

His first journal article on the economics of happiness was published in 1994 in The Economic Journal (on unhappiness and unemployment, jointly written with Andrew E Clark). Some see this as the beginning of the new and now large modern literature by economists on well-being; the early seminal work, in the 1970s, which was ignored by economists for two decades, was by Richard Easterlin (1974). A related but different approach, where people are asked how they feel about a variety of income levels, was by Bernard van Praag (1971) and his Leyden school. Andrew Oswald has published papers in scholarly journals across the fields of economics, social science, statistics, psychology, and epidemiology.

According to Andrew Oswald's website he has worked principally on labour economics and the economics of wellbeing, (trade unions, labour contracts, the wage curve, entrepreneurship, home ownership and unemployment, the consequences of high oil prices, and the economics of happiness and mental health).

=== Labour economics ===
The first area—stemming from his 1980 Oxford doctorate—was how to write down mathematical models of trade union behaviour. At the time, relatively few economists focused on mathematical models of trade union behaviour. However, along with the important 1981 paper by McDonald and Solow in the American Economic Review, Oswald's work was to become standard in modern textbooks. It included a 1982 paper, in The Economic Journal, which was the first to propose the idea of the ‘utilitarian’ trade union model. Later in the 1980s, he worked on theoretical aspects of labour contracts, with papers in the 1986 American Economic Review and the 1984 Quarterly Journal of Economics. A 1993 paper in Labour Economics argued that last-in-first-out layoff rules means that union indifference curves are locally horizontal. Then began a strand of empirical work on labour markets—particularly the then-unconventional book The Wage Curve (with David Blanchflower), published by MIT Press in 1994. This documented the discovery of a power law—with an exponent of approximately −0.1—linking wages to the local unemployment rate. The book drew on data from 5 million randomly sampled workers in multiple countries. Replications of the wage-curve finding have been found in a large number of nations. His other research on wage formation demonstrated the importance of rent-sharing in the labour market (Quarterly Journal of Economics 1992, Quarterly Journal of Economics 1996); it included it an Oxford University Press book co-authored with Alan Carruth. The fourth strand of work was on entrepreneurship. This led in particular to a 1998 paper, with David Blanchflower, in the Journal of Labor Economics with the title "What makes an entrepreneur?". The paper is frequently cited in literature on entrepreneurship and labour economics. As of 2013, it was reported to be the most-cited paper in the Journal of Labor Economics, according to the Thomson Reuters Web of Science Database. Other work was on the idea that high rates of home ownership lead to a high rate of unemployment (in the 1997 Journal of Economic Perspectives) and that oil price shocks are a key driver of movements in unemployment (in the 1998 Review of Economics and Statistics).

=== The economics of human wellbeing ===
In the early 1990s, the topic of happiness economics received limited attention among economists. The research proposed ways to estimate 'happiness' and job-satisfaction regression equations. Today the area is one of the fastest growing within social science. Andrew Oswald's papers include articles in the 1994 and 1997 Economic Journal, the 1996 Journal of Public Economics, the 2001 American Economic Review, the 2002 International Journal of Epidemiology, and the 2004 Journal of Public Economics. According to RePEc, several of his papers are highly cited within economics literature. A paper in Science, co-authored with Steve Wu, in 2010, showed that across the United States there is a match between subjective well-being scores and objective measures. In 2012, Andrew Oswald published an article in the Proceedings of the National Academy of Sciences of the USA arguing that, like humans, great apes have a tendency to U-shaped wellbeing through life. Oswald has also worked on the beneficial influence of a fruit-and-vegetable diet on happiness and psychological health, in articles in Social Indicators Research in 2013 and the American Journal of Public Health in 2016.

=== Measuring societal achievement ===
Oswald has questioned the dominance of GDP in progress measurement, and said "Feelings data will dominate data collection in our world in the very long run."

=== COVID-19 ===
In April 2020, Oswald released a paper, jointly written with Nattavudh Powdthavee, on the idea that the young cohort of workers could be released first from the coronavirus crisis ‘lockdown’ of 2020. This led to public debate and publicity in newspapers such as the Financial Times.

== Other work ==
Oswald's other work includes research that finds a U-shape in human well-being through life, on blood pressure and well-being, on happiness and productivity, on antidepressants, and on risk-taking. His recent co-authors include Nick Powdthavee, author of The Happiness Equation, and the Warwick economists Eugenio Proto and Daniel Sgroi.

More broadly, earlier journal articles included work on the design of optimal nonlinear taxation in a world in which people care about their relative income (in the 1983 Journal of Public Economics) and on why humans imitate each other (in the 1998 Journal of Public Economics). These articles are rather mathematical. He has also worked with Liam Graham on the theory of hedonic adaptation (in the 2010 Journal of Economic Behavior and Organization); a key idea in their paper is that humans have a pool of psychic resources called by the authors 'hedonic capital'.

== Media contributions ==
Oswald contributed to the BBC series The Happiness Formula, has written over 200 articles for newspapers and magazines, and given about 1000 broadcast-media interviews around the world. His article in the Financial Times entitled "The Hippies Were Right All Along about Happiness" (19 January 2006) attracted media attention and commentary. In England he has contributed to public debate on many issues—including warning of a housing crash in newspaper articles in The Times in the middle of the 2000s, his writing in The Economist about the need for liberalized remuneration in UK universities, promulgating the case for higher taxes on fossil fuels and petrol, and arguing for a larger private-rental housing sector in the European nations as a way of helping the labour market.

== Personal life ==
Oswald is the eldest son of the late Professor Ian Oswald.

Oswald is married to Amanda Goodall (Bayes Business School) and he has two daughters.
