= People's Quantitative Easing =

Policy proposal; central banks invest directly in infrastructure and housing

People's Quantitative Easing (PQE) is a policy proposed by Jeremy Corbyn during the 2015 Labour leadership election in August. It would require the Bank of England to create money to finance government investment via a National Investment Bank.

== Policy ==
Corbyn proposes to have the Bank of England create money to invest in housing and public transport, described by Corbyn as "People's Quantitative Easing". This would aim to turn the UK into a high-skill, high-tech economy and to build more council houses in order to lower long-term housing benefit costs. To achieve this, the Bank would purchase bonds for a state-owned "National Investment Bank".

The policy is based on ideas put forward by Richard Murphy. Murphy argues it is a policy designed for use in 2020, in the event the economy remains flat despite traditional quantitative easing, with low inflation, low interest rates, high unemployment and low wages. If the economy is growing strongly, PQE would not be needed as increasing tax revenues would pay for necessary investment.

== Reaction ==
The policy was criticised by other leadership candidates, who claimed it was 'economically illiterate' and would increase the risk of investing in the UK. It would also clash with Article 123 of the EU's Lisbon Treaty which prevents central banks from printing money to finance government spending and could cause a legal battle with the European Court of Justice. The Daily Telegraph wrote that as quantitative easing had the potential to cause inflation; currently the Bank of England holds onto the money it creates and thus has the power to 'unwind QE' by reversing it, whereas if the money had gone into a National Investment Bank, this would not be possible.

On 3 August 2015, Labour's shadow chancellor, Chris Leslie, criticised the proposal on the grounds that it could provoke higher inflation and interest rates.

However, economist Robert Skidelsky offered a qualified endorsement of Corbyn's proposals to carry out PQE through a National Investment Bank, and both The Guardian and the Financial Times have published articles complimenting the idea. The Guardian also published an article by Tony Yates, economist at Birmingham University critical of the proposal. Yates suggested it could encourage reckless spending by governments to finance "pet projects" and could encourage governments to print money to finance pre election booms followed by austerity after a government is reelected and could fuel extreme inflation. Yates is further concerned that high inflation and economic uncertainty tends to hit poor people hardest. The Independent published an article arguing that a limited amount of PQE would usefully increase employment and inflation, reducing the burden of debt accumulated since the 2008 financial crisis.

The Daily Telegraph reported that HSBC's chief economist, Stephen King, and Standard Life's senior international economist, Jeremy Lawson, support policies such as People's Quantitative Easing should the economy move into another downturn despite the use of traditional quantitative easing (QE) policies.

In August 2015, Corbyn stated he had had messages of support on his economic policies in general from economists Paul Krugman and Joseph Stiglitz.

Following the formation of the Economic Advisory Committee, announced on 27 September 2015 at the Labour Party Conference in Brighton, then BBC News Economics Editor Robert Peston contended that the composition of the panel, which included Simon Wren-Lewis and Joseph Stiglitz, signalled that the policy was probably dead, as he felt that while this particular group of economists would, "back the notion of the government taking advantage of prevailing low interest rates to borrow considerably more for investment in infrastructure," they would not support the ultra formulation of the policy, "for fear that the anti-inflationary credentials of the Bank of England would be destroyed", and that if the policy survived it would be as, "a contingent rainy-day monetary tool, for when the economy is next in direst straits."

In February 2019, the New Statesman claimed People's Quantitative Easing was evocative of Modern monetary theory.

== See also ==
- Development finance institution
- European Investment Bank
- Fiscal policy
- Government bond
- Government investment pool
- Government spending
- Monetary policy
- Public finance
- Public infrastructure
- Scottish National Investment Bank
