= Richard Seymour (21st-century writer) =

Northern Irish author (born 1977)

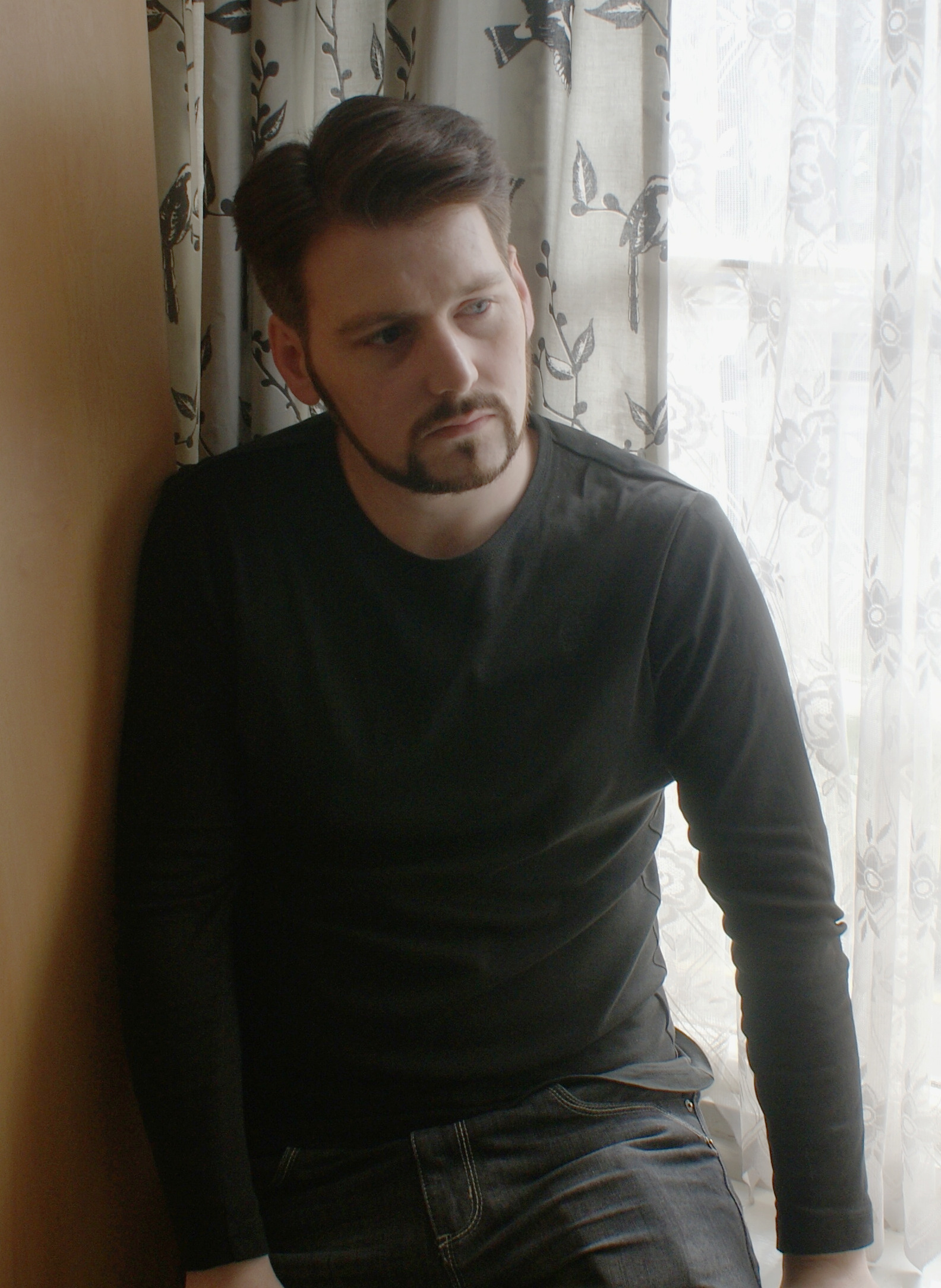
- Seymour in 2014
- Born: 1977 (age 48–49); Ballymena, Northern Ireland
- Education: London School of Economics and Political Science (PhD)
- Occupations: Writer, journalist, political theorist
- Writing career
- Period: 2003–present
- Notable works: Unhitched (2013); Corbyn: The Strange Rebirth of Radical Politics (2016)
- Political party: Socialist Workers Party (until 2013)

Academic background
- Thesis: Cold War anticommunism and the defence of white supremacy in the southern United States (2016)
- Doctoral advisor: Paul Gilroy
- Website: www.leninology.co.uk

Richard Seymour (/ˈsiːmɔːr/; born 1977) is a Northern Irish author, commentator and owner of the blog Lenin's Tomb. His books included The Meaning of David Cameron (2010), Unhitched (2013), Against Austerity (2014) and Corbyn: The Strange Rebirth of Radical Politics (2016). Seymour was born in Ballymena, Northern Ireland to a Protestant family, and currently lives in London. A former member of the Socialist Workers Party, he left the organisation in March 2013.

He completed his PhD in sociology at the London School of Economics under the supervision of Paul Gilroy. His thesis, dated 2016, was titled Cold War anticommunism and the defence of white supremacy in the southern United States. In the past he has written for publications such as The Guardian and Jacobin.

== Commentator ==
=== Lenin's Tomb blog and other outlets ===
The blog Lenin's Tomb began in June 2003 and was listed in 2005 as the 21st-most-popular blog in the United Kingdom. Although run by Seymour, it also has front-page posts from other contributors, including, occasionally, China Miéville. It has been cited by the BBC, The Guardian, Private Eye, and Slate magazine. Seymour writes about "issues such as imperialism, Zionism, Islamophobia and anti-capitalism, and covers strikes and protests with footage, images and reportage".

Beginning in January 2013, Seymour focused his blog on an internal crisis involving allegations of rape committed by a member of the SWP's central committee, and accepted guest entries from other party members criticising the party leadership's response. He announced his resignation from the SWP on 11 March, and began using the original blog to convey a more thorough account of the party's crisis than hitherto. Writing in The Guardian, Seymour responded to an article by Julie Sherry, a central committee member: "We will take no lessons from the Daily Mail, Sherry says. How right she is. With a record like this, who needs lessons from the Daily Mail?"

Seymour has also written for the London Review of Books, ABC Australia, Al Jazeera, In These Times and other publications. Since September 2014, he has recorded a regular segment for TeleSur English programme, The World Today with Tariq Ali.

In 2015, Seymour co-founded Salvage, a "bi-annual journal of revolutionary arts and letters".

== The Liberal Defence of Murder ==
Seymour's first book was The Liberal Defence of Murder published in 2008. Owen Hatherley gave a positive review in the New Statesman. A review in Independent on Sunday by the policy director of Save the Children described the book as "timely, provocative and thought-provoking". A review in The Times praised the book as a "powerful counter-blast against the monstrous regiment of 'useful idiots'". A review in the Journal of American Studies commended the book's "truly impressive breadth and depth".

In contrast, columnist Oliver Kamm, writing for his Times blog accused Seymour of historiographical distortions. Seymour posted a lengthy reply to Kamm's criticisms on his own blog. A critical review in The Guardian by Philippe Sands contended that despite the book's "damning material" on the supporters of war, this "potentially important book" was weakened by "the generality" of its conclusions and the failure to concede that there are instances where the use of force is justified.

== Unhitched: The Trial of Christopher Hitchens ==
Unhitched, published in 2013, focuses on Christopher Hitchens's work on religion, his engagement with British politics and his alleged embrace of American imperialism.

== Corbyn: The Strange Rebirth of Radical Politics ==
Corbyn, published in 2016, with a second edition published in 2017, is an analysis of Jeremy Corbyn's rise to the leadership of the Labour Party. Stephen Bush in the New Statesman described it as "the finest study of Corbyn yet written" with Robert Potts in The Times Literary Supplement described it as "witty and acute political and historical analysis from a position to the left of Corbyn". A Foreign Affairs review characterised it as "essential reading", "by turns inspiring and implausible". It was named among Times Higher Education's books of 2016, and The Observer's '100 best political books'.

== Controversy ==
On 2 September 2015, in a private Facebook comment on a Daily Telegraph column detailing Falklands War veteran and serious burns victim Simon Weston's remarks regarding then Labour Party Leadership candidate Jeremy Corbyn's plan, according to Weston, to "surrender" the Falkland Islands to Argentina, Seymour wrote: "If he knew anything, he'd still have his face".

Under a shared Facebook post, Seymour commented on a video of an Israeli: "He makes me sick. He's a piece of shit. He's standing there complaining that the army isn't helping the colonists keep the Palestinians in their place. Fuck him, they should cut his throat." Tom Peck of The Independent wrote that the Israeli was a "Jewish journalist", whereas Seymour questioned the claim that the person was a journalist and wrote that he was "a settler and hasbara activist, who runs an American-Israeli PR firm".

Seymour was a speaker at a September 2016 event in Liverpool organised by the Momentum group which coincided with the Labour Party's conference in the city. Katie Green, chair of the campaign of Jeremy Corbyn's unsuccessful challenger, Owen Smith in the 2016 Labour leadership election, was quoted by The Independent over Seymour's comments: "These kind of violent and deeply offensive remarks make a mockery of Jeremy's 'kinder, gentler politics.' Jeremy should be condemning his comments".

Seymour wrote a lengthy post in response, as well as a more concise apology. Part of the apology read:

"To be absolutely clear. I do not think that Simon Weston’s injuries deserve ridicule. I emphatically do not think that people who advocate for the West Bank settlers should have their throats cut. I certainly didn’t mention or even consider the ethnicity of the individual in question, and the attempts to imply that this was a factor in the original statement are invidious and dishonest. I at no point sought a public audience for these comments, and never sought to solicit anyone’s anguish. I am, of course, very sorry to anyone who was hurt."

== Published works ==
- 2008 The Liberal Defence of Murder. ISBN 978-1-84467-240-0, Verso Books.
- 2008 "The Genocidal Imagination of Christopher Hitchens", in Christopher Hitchens and His Critics: Terror, Iraq and the Left. ISBN 0-8147-1687-3, New York University Press.
- 2009 "John Spargo and American Socialism", in Historical Materialism, 17 (2), pp. 272–285.
- 2010 "The War on Terror as Political Violence", in Marie Breen Smyth, ed., The Ashgate Research Companion to Political Violence.
- 2010 The Meaning of David Cameron. ISBN 978-1-84694-456-7, Zero Books.
- 2011 American Insurgents: A Short History of American Anti-Imperialism. ISBN 978-1-60846-141-7, Haymarket Books.
- 2012 Unhitched: The Trial of Christopher Hitchens. ISBN 978-1-84467-990-4, Verso Books.
- 2014 Against Austerity. ISBN 978-0745333281, Pluto Press, London.
- 2014 "Race and the Cold War", in Alexander Anievas, Nivi Manchanda, Robbie Shilliam, eds., Race and Racism in International Relations: Confronting the Global Colour Line.
- 2016 Corbyn: The Strange Rebirth of Radical Politics. ISBN 978-1784785314, Verso Books.
- 2019 The Twittering Machine. ISBN 978-1999683382, Indigo Press, London.
- 2022 The Disenchanted Earth: Reflections on Ecosocialism and Barbarism. ISBN 978-1911648413, Indigo Press, London.
- 2024 Disaster Nationalism: The Downfall of Liberal Civilization ISBN 978-1804294253, Verso Books.
