= New Economics Tour =

The New Economics Tour is a series of free public events starting in 2016, sponsored by the British Labour Party, which were launched by its Shadow Chancellor John McDonnell with the stated aim of taking the economic debate away from the Westminster-dominated view.

Speakers appearing on the tour include high-profile names, including journalist and broadcaster Paul Mason, former Greek finance minister Yanis Varoufakis and members of the Labour Party's Economic Advisory Committee. Topics to be covered include inequality, technology and work, and the strategic state. While the centre-piece is to be a national conference on economics curated by McDonnell in May.

Commentators Callum Towler and Liam Young responded positively to the launch, with the former stating that, "If Labour is to gain a firm grip on the economy again, this series is a great start," and the latter stating that, "Not only did the announcement ensure some good news for Labour’s economic credibility by showing the party backed by respected economists, but it also showed some real direction." Financial columnist Matthew Lynn responded negatively stating that instead of asking important questions the tour, "will push trendy-Left thinkers such as Mariana Mazzucato", "elevating quack economics to the national stage."
