= Ronen Palan =

Israeli economist

- Born: 21 March 1957 (age 69); Haifa, Israel

Academic background
- Education: London School of Economics (BSc, PhD)

Academic work
- Discipline: Public economics
- Institutions: City University of London
- Notable ideas: Corporate tax; Tax havens
- Website: Ronan Palan

Ronen Palan (Hebrew: רונן פאלאן; born 21 March 1957) is an Israeli-born economist and Professor of International Political Economy in the Department of International Politics at the City University London. He has many books and articles on the political economy of the state, globalisation and state strategies, and evolutionary approaches to the study of international relations. Ronen Palan was one of the founding editors of the Review of International Political Economy. Palan's major empirical work is the area of offshore financial centres and tax havens. Palan has argued that offshore finance "is certainly not the sole cause for the decline of the nation-state, but it must be seen as an important contributing factor to the decline".

In January 2016, Palan acted as an advisor to the BBC's documentary, Britain’s Trillion Pound Paradise – Inside Cayman. In May 2017, Palan also featured in the documentary, "The Spider's Web: Britain's Second Empire" on the U.K.'s relationships with tax havens.

== Biography ==
As a student, Palan attended the London School of Economics, where he produced his PhD thesis Patterns of non-governmental interactions as a bridge between the structuralist theory of the state and the study of international relations. He subsequently worked at Newcastle University and the University of Sussex before joining Birmingham University in 2007. Palan has authored and edited a number of books, including Global Political Economy: Contemporary Theories (edited, Routledge, 2000), The Offshore World: Sovereign Markets, Virtual Places, and Nomad Millionaires (Cornell University Press, 2003), The Imagined Economies of Globalisation (with Angus Cameron, Sage, 2004) and Tax Havens: How Globalization Really Works (with Richard Murphy, Christian Chavagneux, Cornell University Press, 2010).

Palan is married to economist and diplomat Anastasia Nesvetailova. They have two sons.

== Books ==
- Palan, Ronen; Murphy, Richard; Chavagneux, Christian (2009). Tax Havens: How Globalization Really Works. Cornell University Press. ISBN 0-8014-7612-7.
- Cameron, Angus, Palan, R. (2003) The imagined economies of globalization. India: SAGE Publications.
- Palan, Ronen (2003) The Offshore World: Sovereign Markets, Virtual Places, and Nomad Millionaires. Ithaca: Cornell University Press.
- Nesvetailova, Anastasia., Palan, R. (2020) Sabotage: The Business of Finance. United Kingdom: Penguin Books Limited.
