= A Green New Deal =

2008 English-language report by the New Economics Foundation

"A Green New Deal" was a report released in the United Kingdom on 21 July 2008 by the Green New Deal Group and published by the New Economics Foundation, which outlines a series of policy proposals to mitigate Climate change, the 2008 financial crisis, and peak oil. The report calls for the re-regulation of finance and taxation, and major government investment in renewable energy sources. Its full title is: A Green New Deal: Joined-up policies to solve the triple crunch of the credit crisis, climate change and high oil prices.

== Recommendations ==
- Government-led investment in energy efficiency and microgeneration which would make 'every building a powerstation'.
- The creation of thousands of green jobs to enable low-carbon infrastructure reconstruction.
- A windfall tax on the profits of oil and gas companies - as has been established in Norway - so as to provide revenue for government spending on renewable energy and energy efficiency.
- Developing financial incentives for green investment and reduced energy usage.
- Changes to the UK's financial system, including the reduction of the Bank of England's interest rate, once again to support green investment.
- Large financial institutions - 'mega banks' - to be broken up into smaller units and green banking.
- The re-regulation of international finance: ensuring that the financial sector does not dominate the rest of the economy. This would involve the re-introduction of capital controls.
- Increased official scrutiny of exotic financial products such as derivatives.
- The prevention of corporate tax evasion by demanding financial reporting and by clamping down on tax havens.

== In the UK ==
Although the politicians have used the term Green New Deal, it remains largely unimplemented in the form that it was originally proposed. Larry Elliott, the Guardian newspaper's economics editor and one of the originators of the idea, wrote in 2020 that perhaps the policy might be first trialled "in one of the UK’s big cities – Manchester or Glasgow, say – to see whether a GND creates jobs, cuts emissions and generates a new wave of profitable environmental innovation".

== Authors ==
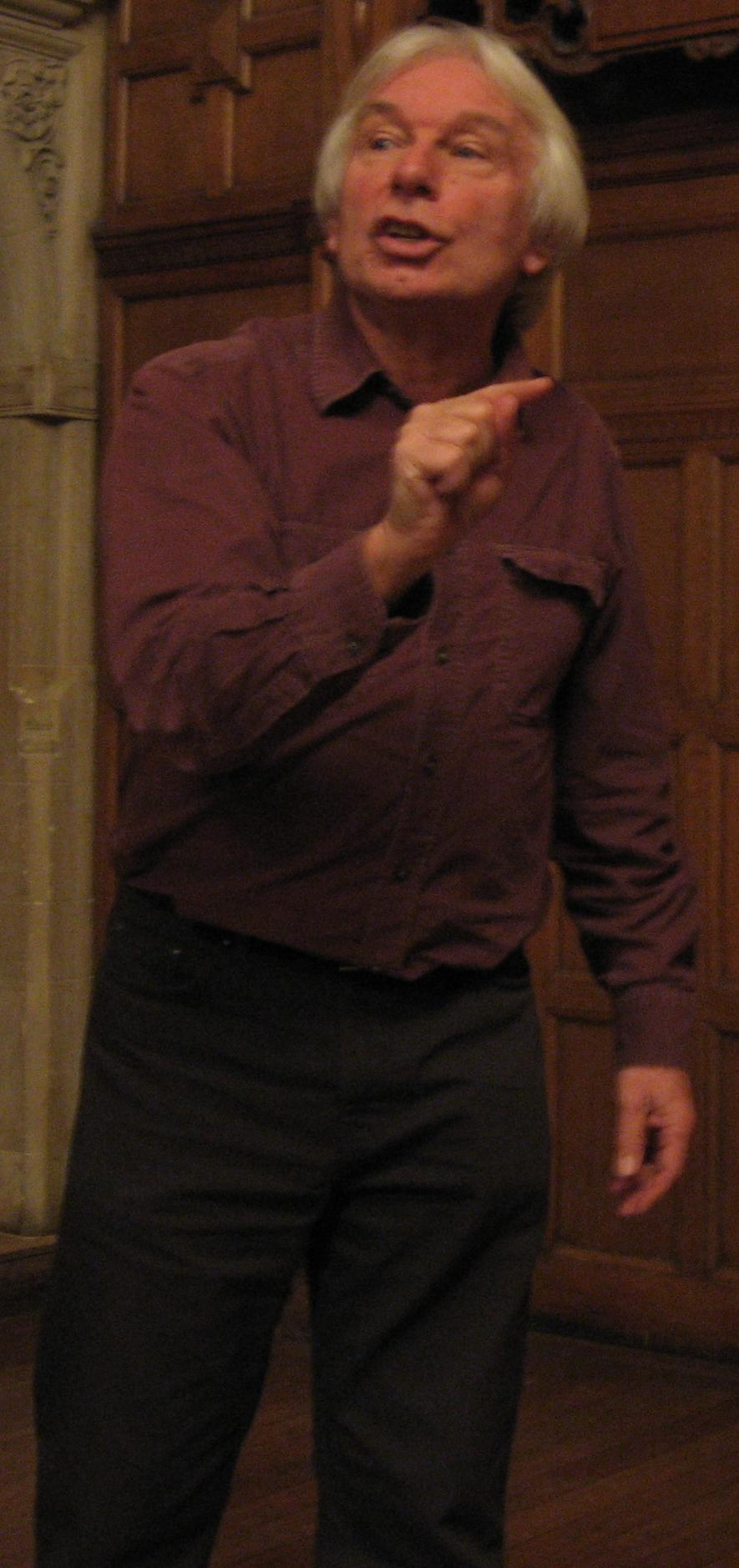
Colin Hines, one of the authors, explaining the Green New Deal in 2009

The authors of "A Green New Deal" are:

- Larry Elliott, economics editor of The Guardian
- Colin Hines, co-director of Finance for the Future
- Tony Juniper, former director of Friends of the Earth
- Jeremy Leggett, founder and chairman of Solarcentury and SolarAid
- Caroline Lucas, Member of Parliament for Brighton Pavilion, former leader of the Green Party of England and Wales, and former Member of the European Parliament
- Richard Murphy, co-director of Finance for the Future and director of Tax Research LLP
- Ann Pettifor, former head of the Jubilee 2000 debt relief campaign and campaign director of Operation Noah
- Charles Secrett, advisor on sustainable development, former director of Friends of the Earth
- Andrew Simms, policy director of the New Economics Foundation

== See also ==
- Climate change mitigation
- Green growth
- Politics of climate change
- Sustainable Development Commission
