= Political positions of Jeremy Corbyn =

Views and voting record of the British politician

This article summarises the views and voting record of Jeremy Corbyn, who was the Leader of the Opposition and Leader of the Labour Party in the United Kingdom from 12 September 2015 until 4 April 2020. An independent, Corbyn was a member of the Labour Party from 1965 until his expulsion in 2024.

== Positioning ==
Corbyn self-identifies as a socialist. He has also been referred to as a "mainstream [Scandinavian] social democrat". He advocates reversing austerity cuts to public services and some welfare funding made since 2010, as well as renationalisation of public utilities and the railways. A longstanding anti-war and anti-nuclear activist, he supports a foreign policy of military non-interventionism and unilateral nuclear disarmament. Writer Ronan Bennett, who formerly worked as a research assistant to Corbyn, has described him as "a kind of vegan, pacifist idealist, one with a clear understanding of politics and history, and a commitment to the underdog".

In 1997, the political scientists David Butler and Dennis Kavanagh described Corbyn's political stance as "far-left". Corbyn has described Karl Marx as a "great economist" and said he has read some of the works of Adam Smith, Marx and David Ricardo and has "looked at many, many others". However, some have argued that Corbyn is less radical than previously described: for example, the journalist George Eaton has called him "Keynesian". In 2023, The Daily Telegraph reported that most of the tax policies in Corbyn's 2019 general election manifesto had been implemented by the winning Conservative government, including a higher corporation tax, a windfall tax on oil companies, a reduction in annual tax allowances on dividend income, raising income tax on high earners, and introducing a digital services tax on online retailers.

Corbyn named John Smith as the former Labour leader whom he most admired, describing him as "a decent, nice, inclusive leader". He also said he was "very close and very good friends" with Michael Foot, and called Tony Benn, with whom he worked closely, "an inspirational figure".

== Economy and taxation ==
Corbyn has campaigned against private finance initiative schemes, supported a higher rate of income tax for the wealthiest in society, and his shadow chancellor proposed the introduction of a £10 per hour living wage. He advocates recouping losses from tax avoidance and evasion by investing £1 billion in HM Revenue and Customs. Corbyn sought to reduce an estimated £93 billion that companies receive in tax relief. The amount is made up of several reliefs, including railway and energy subsidies, regional development grants, relief on investment and government procurement from the private sector.

Corbyn opposes austerity, and has advocated an economic strategy based on investing-to-grow as opposed to making spending cuts. During his first Labour leadership election campaign, Corbyn proposed that the Bank of England should be able to issue money for capital spending, especially housebuilding, instead of quantitative easing, which attempts to stimulate the economy by buying assets from commercial banks. He describes it as "People's Quantitative Easing". A number of economists, including Steve Keen, said that Corbyn's candidature for leadership of the Labour party "recognis[ed] the inspiring possibilities for a fairer and more equal society offered by an information economy in an interdependent world". Robert Skidelsky offered a qualified endorsement of Corbyn's proposals to carry out QE through a National Investment Bank. As the policy would change the central bank's focus on stabilising prices it has been argued it could increase the perceived risk of investing in the UK and raise the prospect of increased inflation. His second leadership campaign saw him promise £500 billion in additional public spending, though he did not detail how he would fund it.

Corbyn has been a consistent supporter of renationalising public utilities, such as the now-privatised British Rail and energy companies, back into public ownership. Initially, Corbyn suggested completely renationalising the entire railway network, but would now bring them under public control "line by line" as franchises expire.

== National and constitutional issues ==
Corbyn is a longstanding supporter of a united Ireland and reportedly described himself as campaigner against imperialism in Ireland in 1984. In 1985, Corbyn voted against the Anglo-Irish Agreement, saying that it strengthened the border between Northern Ireland and the Republic of Ireland and he opposed it as he wished to see a united Ireland. In July 1998, Corbyn endorsed the Good Friday Agreement by voting for the Northern Ireland Bill saying: "We look forward to peace, hope and reconciliation in Ireland in the future."

Corbyn would prefer Britain to become a republic, but has said that, given the Royal Family's popularity, "it's not a battle that I am fighting".

On the issue of Scottish independence, when asked if he would consider himself a unionist, Corbyn said: "No, I would describe myself as a Socialist. I would prefer the UK to stay together, yes, but I recognise the right of people to take the decision on their own autonomy and independence." Corbyn said that he did not favour holding a second Scottish independence referendum, but that it would be wrong for the UK Parliament to block such a referendum if the Scottish Parliament desired to have one.

As Leader of the Opposition, Corbyn was one of the sponsors for the Constitutional Convention Bill, which was an attempt at codifying the UK's constitution, which has not been compiled into a single document. He appointed a Shadow Minister for the Constitutional Convention into his Shadow Cabinet and Teresa Pearce stepped down after the May 2017 local elections and this position has since remained vacant.

In October 2017, Corbyn was one of 113 MPs to sign a cross-party petition to Home Secretary Amber Rudd, which requested making it a criminal offence for opponents of abortion to hold protests outside of abortion clinics. The letter called for buffer zones to be established around clinics, arguing women "face daily abuse when undergoing terminations", with protesters instead given space in town centres or Speakers' corner. He also promised to allow abortion in Northern Ireland as well as same-sex marriage.

== Education ==
During the 2015 Labour leadership contest, Corbyn put forward a policy to scrap all tuition fees and restore student maintenance grants. The cost of the policy was estimated at £10 billion which would be funded by "a 7% rise in national insurance for those earning over £50,000 a year and a 2.5% higher corporation tax, or by slowing the pace at which the deficit is reduced". Corbyn apologised for the actions of previous Labour governments in imposing "fees, top-up fees and the replacement of grants with loans". He said "I opposed those changes at the time – as did many others – and now we have an opportunity to change course".

During the 2017 election, Corbyn had a policy of scrapping university tuition fees from 2018 restoring the maintenance grants abolished by the Conservatives in 2016 and funding a free national education service. He also pledged to investigate cancelling student loan debts incurred by recent graduates. The policy said that the British average student starts their working life with debts of £44,000 due to tuition costs and that university tuition is free in many northern European countries. The education changes were costed at £9.5 billion and would be funded by increasing taxes on the top 5 per cent of earners and increasing corporations tax.

== European Union ==
Corbyn has previously been a left-wing Eurosceptic. In the 1975 European Communities referendum, Corbyn opposed Britain's membership of the European Communities, the precursor of the EU. Corbyn also opposed the ratification of the Maastricht Treaty in 1993, opposed the Lisbon Treaty in 2008, and backed a proposed referendum on British withdrawal from the EU in 2011. He accused the EU of acting "brutally" in the 2015 Greek crisis by allowing financiers to destroy its economy.

During his leadership campaign, Corbyn said there might be circumstances in which he would favour withdrawal from the EU. In September 2015, Corbyn said that Labour would campaign for Britain to stay in the EU regardless of the result of Cameron's negotiations, and instead "pledge to reverse any changes" if Cameron reduced the rights of workers or citizens. He also believed that Britain should play a crucial role in Europe by making demands about working arrangements across the continent, the levels of corporation taxation and in forming an agreement on environmental regulation.

In June 2016, in the run-up to the EU referendum, Corbyn said that there was an "overwhelming case" for staying in the EU. In a speech in London, Corbyn said: "We, the Labour Party, are overwhelmingly for staying in, because we believe the European Union has brought investment, jobs and protection for workers, consumers and the environment." Corbyn also criticised media coverage and warnings from both sides, saying that the debate had been dominated too much by "myth-making and prophecies of doom". He said he was "seven, or seven and a half" out of 10 for staying in the EU.

In July 2017, Corbyn said that Britain could not remain in the European Single Market after leaving the EU, saying that membership of the single market was "dependent on membership of the EU", although it includes some non-EU countries. Shadow Minister Barry Gardiner later suggested that Corbyn meant that Labour interpreted the referendum result as wanting to leave the single market. Corbyn said that Labour would campaign for an alternative arrangement involving "tariff free access". In October 2017, Corbyn said that he would vote remain if there were another referendum.

In January 2018, Corbyn reiterated that Labour would not seek to keep the UK in the single market after Brexit and in June 2018 he called for a "new single market" deal for the UK after Brexit maintaining "full access" to the EU internal market, as opposed to the "Norway model" which pro-Remainers in the party wish to see.

In 2018, Corbyn said his main reason for not committing to remaining in the single market was freedom from EU rules on state aid to industry. He said the UK government should not be "held back, inside or outside the EU, from taking the steps we need to support cutting edge industries and local business". This prompted backlash from senior EU figures, who said that state subsidisation would be a "red line" in negotiations, as it would lead to a possible trade war between the UK and EU. One senior figure told The Times: "We have to protect ourselves and the single market ... If a Corbyn government implements his declared policies the level playing field mechanism will lead to increased costs for Britain to access the single market because of distortions caused by state aid."

Also in 2018, Corbyn said he would seek a new type of customs union with the European Union, but will seek exemptions of some EU regulations for the UK, such as those regarding state aid and government subsidies.

In January 2019, Labour lost a vote of no confidence in the government. The Conservative government sought to open cross-party talks while Corbyn initially said Labour would refuse to attend talks unless the government ruled out a "no deal Brexit". In March 2019, Corbyn said that he could vote leave in a second referendum, depending on the Brexit deal on offer.

Following the 2019 European Parliament election, Corbyn endorsed holding a referendum on the Brexit withdrawal agreement regardless of who negotiates it.

== Foreign affairs ==
=== War and peace ===
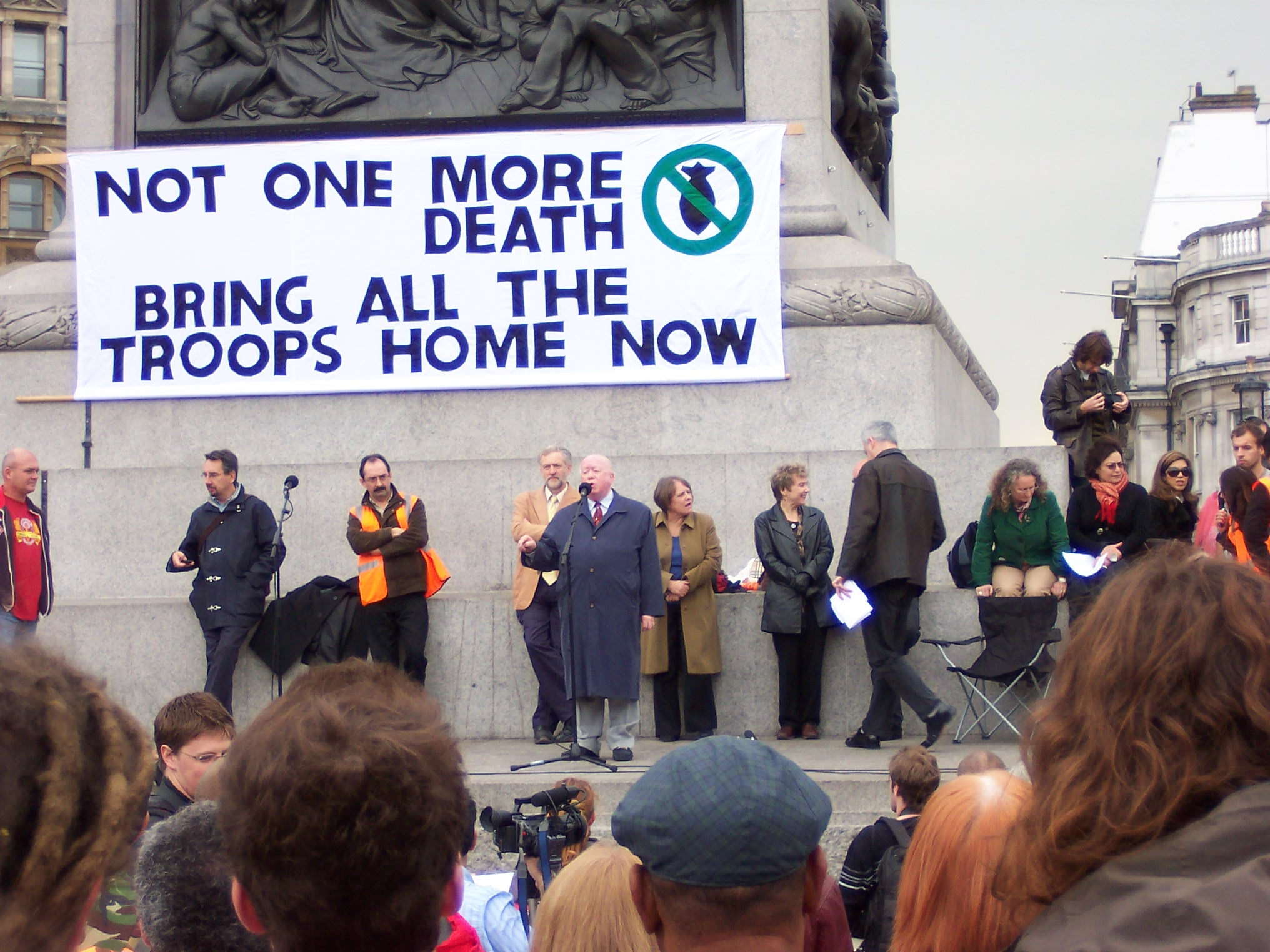
Corbyn spoke at a series of anti-Iraq War demonstrations.

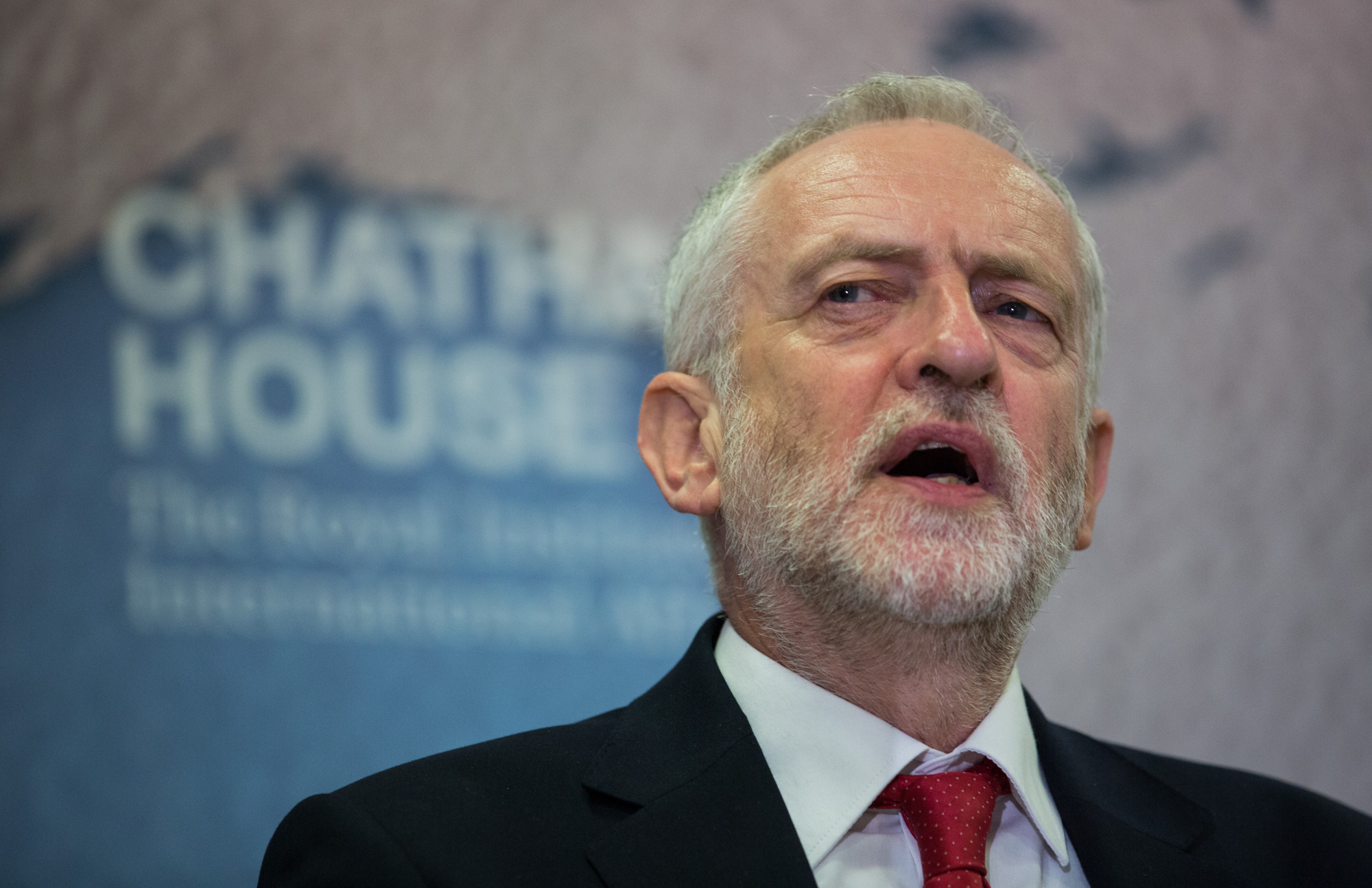
Corbyn outlining Labour's Defence and Foreign Policy priorities during a May 2017 speech at Chatham House

During the 1982 Falklands War, in a meeting of Haringey Council, Corbyn opposed a motion offering support to British troops sent to retake the islands, instead declaring the war to be a "Tory plot" and submitted an alternative motion that condemned the war as a "nauseating waste of lives and money". Corbyn has said that he would like Britain to achieve "some reasonable accommodation" with Argentina over their Falkland Islands dispute, with a "degree of joint administration" between the two countries over the islands.

Corbyn does not consider himself an absolute pacifist and in 2015 named the Spanish Civil War, the British naval blockade to stop the slave trade in the nineteenth century and the role of UN peacekeepers in the 1999 crisis in East Timor as justified conflicts. In an interview from the same year, he said that opposing violence and war had been "the whole purpose of his life". He prominently opposed the invasion of Iraq and War in Afghanistan, NATO-led military intervention in Libya, military strikes against Assad's Syria, and military action against ISIS, and served as the chair of the Stop the War Coalition. When challenged on whether there were any circumstances in which he would deploy military forces overseas he said "I'm sure there are some but I can't think of them at the moment."

Corbyn has called for Tony Blair to be investigated for alleged war crimes during the Iraq War. In July 2016, the Chilcot Report of the Iraq Inquiry was issued, criticising Blair for joining the United States in the war against Iraq. Subsequently, Corbyn – who had voted against military action against Iraq – gave a speech in Westminster commenting: "I now apologise sincerely on behalf of my party for the disastrous decision to go to war in Iraq in March 2003" which he called an "act of military aggression launched on a false pretext" something that has "long been regarded as illegal by the overwhelming weight of international opinion". Corbyn specifically apologised to "the people of Iraq"; to the families of British soldiers who died in Iraq or returned injured; and to "the millions of British citizens who feel our democracy was traduced and undermined by the way in which the decision to go to war was taken on."

Corbyn has said he would prefer to use diplomacy rather than armed force in international conflict. He would avoid military conflict by "building up the diplomatic relationships and also trying to not isolate any country in Europe". His aim is to "achieve a world where we don't need to go to war, where there is no need for it".

=== NATO ===
Corbyn favours the United Kingdom leaving NATO, and for NATO to be disbanded. In May 2012, Corbyn authored a piece in the Morning Star titled "High time for an end to NATO" where he described the organisation as an "instrument of cold war manipulation", saying that "The collapse of the Soviet Union in 1990, with the ending of the Warsaw Pact mutual defence strategy, was the obvious time for NATO to have been disbanded." and also said in a 2014 speech that the organisation was an "engine for the delivery of oil to the oil companies" and called for it to "give up, go home and go away".

For these comments and a refusal to answer whether he would defend a NATO ally in the case of attack he was criticised by Anders Fogh Rasmussen, the former Prime Minister of Denmark and NATO Secretary General, who said Corbyn's opinions were "tempting President Putin to aggression" and made comparisons between his views and those of the American president Donald Trump. He was also criticised by George Robertson, former Labour Party defence secretary, who said "It beggars belief that the leader of the party most responsible for the collective security pact of NATO should be so reckless as to undermine it by refusing to say he would come to the aid of an ally".

He has since acknowledged that the British public do not agree with his beliefs that the UK should leave NATO, and instead intends to push for the organisation to "restrict its role". He believes there should be a debate about the extent of NATO's powers including its "democratic accountability" and why it has taken on a global role. In April 2014, Corbyn wrote an article for the Morning Star attributing the crisis in Ukraine to NATO. While he said that he does "not condone Russian behaviour or expansion", he described Russia's actions as "not unprovoked". He has said it "probably was" a mistake to allow former Warsaw Pact countries to join NATO as it has increased tensions with Russia and made the "world infinitely more dangerous". In 2022, after the full-scale Russian invasion of Ukraine, he repeatedly criticised the British government and other Western countries for supplying arms to Ukraine.

During the 2017 election, when questioned about Corbyn's anti-NATO statements, Labour Shadow Foreign Secretary Emily Thornberry said, "Jeremy has been on a journey, to coin a phrase. There have been a number of discussions. It is quite clear that the predominance of opinion within the Labour is that we are committed to NATO."

=== Nuclear weapons ===
Corbyn is a longstanding supporter of unilateral nuclear disarmament, although he has suggested a compromise of having submarines without nuclear weapons. He has campaigned for many years against nuclear weapons and the replacement of Trident and has said he would not authorise the use of nuclear weapons if he were prime minister. In June 2016, he agreed to allow Labour MPs a free vote on the replacement of Trident. In the subsequent vote 140 Labour MPs voted with the government in favour of the new submarines, in line with party policy, and 47 joined Corbyn to vote against. During the debate Corbyn said "I do not believe the threat of mass murder is a legitimate way to deal with international relations".

=== Donald Trump ===
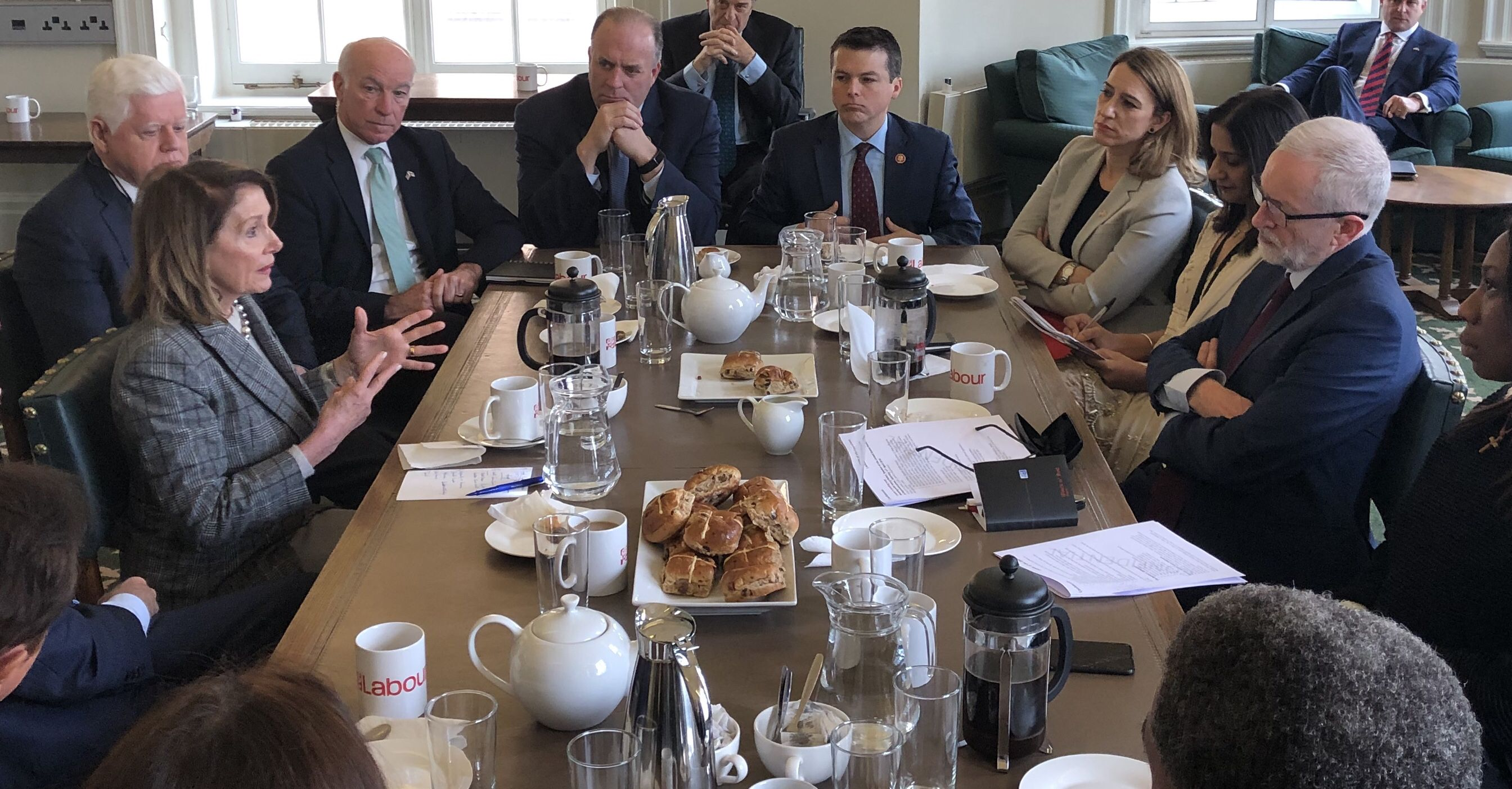
Corbyn meets the Speaker of the U.S. House of Representatives Nancy Pelosi in 2019.

Following the election of Donald Trump in the 2016 US presidential elections, Corbyn said that he believes that President Trump is not offering solutions to problems, but simply being divisive. Corbyn also called for a proposed Trump state visit to the UK to be cancelled following his executive order banning visitors from certain majority-Muslim countries from entering the US.

Corbyn criticised Trump's involvement in British politics after Trump said Boris Johnson should become PM and Nigel Farage should be part of the Brexit negotiating team, saying that it was "not [Trump's] business who the British prime minister is" following Trump's endorsement of Boris Johnson as a possible future leader. Corbyn criticised Trump's attacks on Sadiq Khan as "unacceptable".

=== Israel and Palestine ===
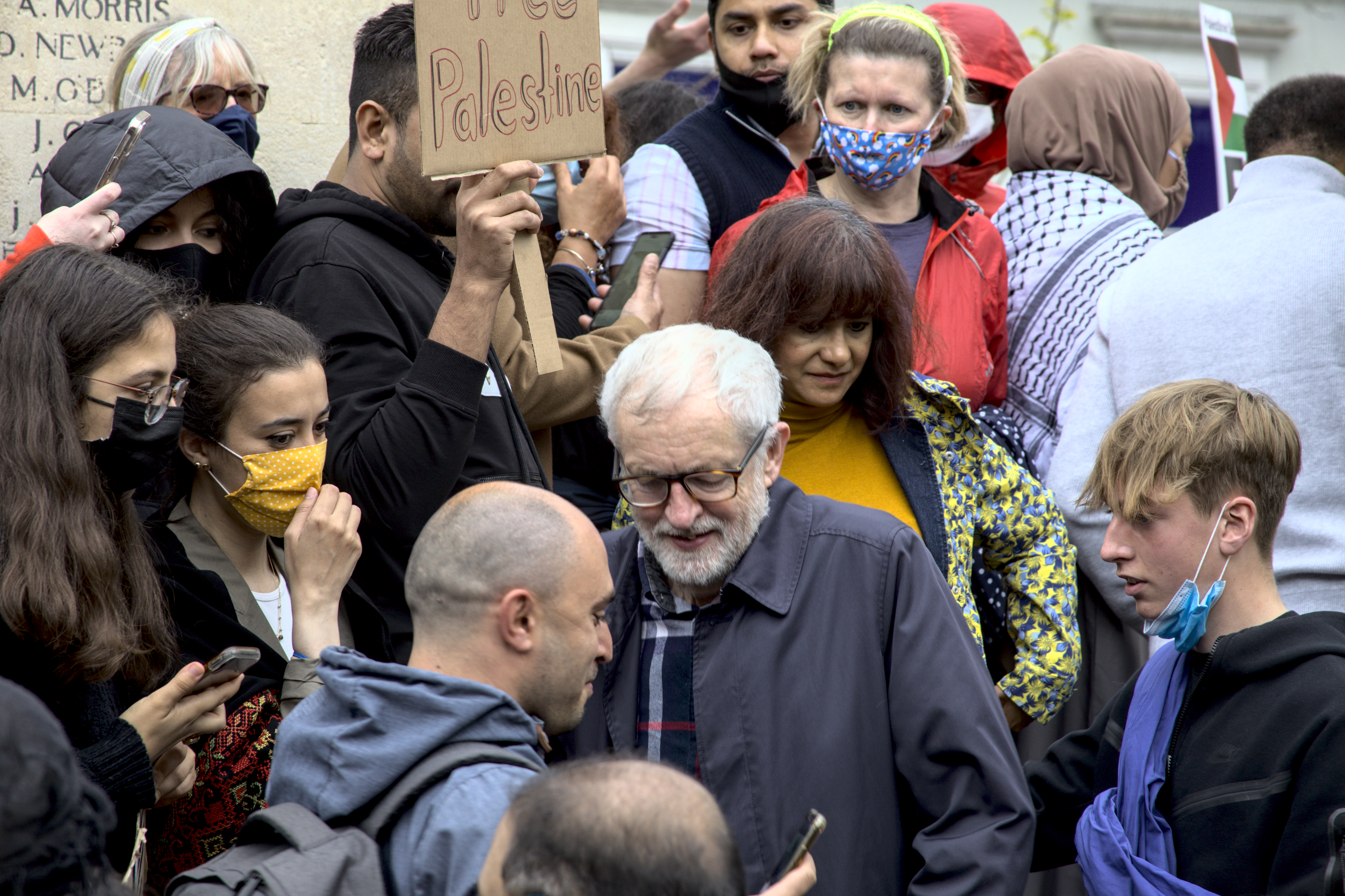
Corbyn at a march for Palestine in Oxford in 2021

Corbyn is a member of the Palestine Solidarity Campaign, campaigning, for example, against the killing of Palestinian civilians during the Gaza–Israel conflict. In 2012 and again in 2017, Corbyn called for an investigation into Israeli influence in British politics. In August 2016, Corbyn said: "I am not in favour of the academic or cultural boycott of Israel, and I am not in favour of a blanket boycott of Israeli goods. I do support targeted boycotts aimed at undermining the existence of illegal settlements in the West Bank."

At a meeting hosted by Stop the War Coalition in 2009, six years before he became Labour leader, Corbyn said "It would be my pleasure and my honour to host an event in Parliament where our friends from Hezbollah will be speaking. I've also invited friends from Hamas to come and speak as well." He referred to Hamas as "an organisation dedicated towards the good of the Palestinian people," and said that the British government's labelling of Hamas as a terrorist organisation is "a big, big historical mistake." Asked on Channel 4 News in July 2015 why he had called representatives from Hamas and Hezbollah "friends", Corbyn explained, "I use it in a collective way, saying our friends are prepared to talk," and that the specific occasion he used it was to introduce speakers from Hezbollah at a Parliamentary meeting about the Middle East. He said that he does not condone the actions of either organisation: "Does it mean I agree with Hamas and what it does? No. Does it mean I agree with Hezbollah and what they do? No. What it means is that I think to bring about a peace process, you have to talk to people with whom you may profoundly disagree … There is not going to be a peace process unless there is talks involving Israel, Hezbollah and Hamas and I think everyone knows that", he argued.

In January 2017, Corbyn expressed concern about Israeli involvement in British politics, after the broadcasting of The Lobby. He described the actions of the Israeli official, Shai Masot, as "improper interference in this country's democratic process" and was concerned on national security grounds that Boris Johnson had said the matter was closed.

In his keynote speech at the 2018 annual Labour Party conference, Corbyn said that, if elected, his government would immediately recognise the Palestinian State as a way of supporting a two-state solution to the Israeli-Palestinian conflict. He declared that the Labour Party condemned the "shooting of hundreds of unarmed demonstrators in Gaza by Israeli forces and the passing of Israel's discriminatory nation-state law".

In May 2019, Corbyn sent a message of support to the National Demonstration for Palestine in London in which Ahed Tamimi participated. He said the Labour Party condemned the "ongoing human rights abuses by Israeli forces, including the shooting by Israeli forces of hundreds of unarmed Palestinian demonstrators in Gaza – most of them refugees or families of refugees – demanding their rights".

In a television interview following the 2023 Hamas-led attack on Israel, Corbyn, when questioned, repeatedly refused to designate Hamas as a "terror group". Some days later, in an opinion piece in Tribune magazine, he wrote that Hamas is a "terrorist organisation" and that the Israel army has carried out "acts of terror too".

=== Tunisian wreath-laying controversy ===
In October 2014, Corbyn visited Tunisia to attend the "International Conference on Monitoring the Palestinian Political and Legal Situation in the Light of Israeli Aggression", organised by the Centre for Strategic Studies for North Africa. While there, Corbyn and other British parliamentarians attended a commemoration for victims of the 1985 Israeli air strikes on the PLO headquarters in Tunis. The bombardment had been condemned by British Prime Minister Margaret Thatcher and US President Ronald Reagan, as well as the UN Security Council.

In August 2018, the Daily Mail reported, with pictorial evidence, that during the event, Corbyn had also been present at a wreath-laying at the graves of Salah Khalaf and Atef Bseiso, both of whom are thought to have been key members of the Black September Organization, which was behind the 1972 Munich massacre. The Jerusalem Post commented: "In another photo, Corbyn is seen close to the grave of terrorist Atef Bseiso, intelligence chief of the Palestine Liberation Organization. Bseiso is also linked to the massacre." There was condemnation from some of the British press, as well as from some members of the Labour Party and Israeli Prime Minister Benjamin Netanyahu. A Labour spokesperson said that "a wreath was laid on behalf of those at the conference to all those who lost their lives, including families and children".

On 1 August, BBC News showed in a report from inside the cemetery that for the memorial for the 1985 victims, Corbyn would have stood in a designated confined covered area where all dignitaries typically stand during annual ceremonies, which also covers the graves of Bseiso and Khalaf. Corbyn said that he had been present during commemorations where a wreath was laid for Palestinian leaders linked to Black September, but did not think that he had actually been involved. A Labour spokesperson stated that Corbyn "did not lay any wreath at the graves of those alleged to have been linked to the Black September Organisation or the 1972 Munich killings. He of course condemns that terrible attack, as he does the 1985 bombing." The Labour Party initially made a complaint to the press watchdog Independent Press Standards Organisation against several newspapers' alleged misreporting of the event, although this was later dropped.

=== Kosovo ===
Unlike most Labour MPs at the time, Corbyn and a few other backbenchers opposed NATO intervention during the Kosovo War. In 2004, Corbyn and 24 other backbenchers signed a parliamentary motion praising an article by journalist John Pilger for "reminding readers of the devastating human cost of the so-termed 'humanitarian' invasion of Kosovo, led by NATO and the United States in the Spring of 1999, without any sanction of the United Nations Security Council". The motion also congratulated Pilger "on his expose of the fraudulent justifications for intervening in a 'genocide' that never really existed in Kosovo". The motion said that initial estimates of casualties by the US Ambassador for War Crimes Issues were much higher than the later body count by the International War Crimes Tribunal. Balkan Insight wrote that, during the 2015 campaign for the Labour leadership, Corbyn was criticised by bloggers and journalists for "having once apparently dismissed Serbian war crimes in Kosovo as a fabrication".

=== Sri Lanka and the Tamil Tigers ===
In 2006, Corbyn signed a petition calling for the lifting of the ban on the Tamil Tigers, which it referred to as the "supposedly terrorist Tamil Tigers", stating that "the Sri Lanka government is carrying out an undeclared war against the Tamil people who have been struggling for more than two decades for the legitimate right to self-rule" and calling for an end to aerial bombardment by the Sri Lankan government. In 2009, Corbyn called for a total economic boycott of Sri Lanka, stating "the tourism must stop, the arms must stop, the trade must stop", he later stated the Sri Lankan cricket team should also be boycotted. He expressed outrage particularly at the reports of the depopulation of Tamil areas of Eastern Sri Lanka and the relocation of Tamils, stating that denying Tamils the right to return home was in contravention of international law, as well as reports of systematic sexual violence.

In 2016, after Corbyn released a video stating his "solidarity to stand with the Tamil community in the search for truth, justice, accountability and reconciliation", while the Labour Party reiterated its " full implementation of the UN Human Rights Councils resolution on Sri Lanka", some Tamil activists interpreted the video to be a signal of Jeremy Corbyn's "support for Tamil self-determination". In 2017, John McDonnell stated that a Corbyn led Labour government would end arms sales to Sri Lanka.

=== Iran ===
Corbyn has called for the lifting of the sanctions on Iran as part of a negotiated full settlement of issues concerning the Iranian nuclear programme, and the starting of a political process to decommission Israel's nuclear arsenal.

=== Saudi Arabia ===
Corbyn has criticised Britain's close ties with Saudi Arabia and British involvement in the Saudi Arabian-led intervention in Yemen. In January 2016, after a United Nations panel ruled Saudi-led bombing campaign of Yemen contravened international humanitarian law, Corbyn called for an independent inquiry into the UK's arms exports policy to Saudi Arabia. Corbyn and Hilary Benn wrote to David Cameron asking him to "set out the exact nature of the involvement of UK personnel working with the Saudi military". Corbyn has constantly called for the British Government to stop selling arms to Saudi Arabia to show that Britain wants a peace process in Yemen, "not an invasion by Saudi Arabia". In March 2018, Corbyn accused Theresa May's government of "colluding" in war crimes committed by Saudi forces in Yemen. He said that a "humanitarian disaster is now taking place in Yemen. Millions face starvation...because of the Saudi led bombing campaign and the blockade."

Corbyn called for the suspension of arms sales to Saudi Arabia after dissident Saudi journalist Jamal Khashoggi was murdered inside the Saudi consulate in Istanbul. Corbyn also called for an international investigation into the assassination of Jamal Khashoggi and Saudi's war crimes in Yemen.

=== Chagos Islands sovereignty dispute ===
The sovereignty of the Chagos Archipelago in the Indian Ocean is disputed between the United Kingdom and Mauritius. Corbyn said he would respect a UN vote calling on the UK to decolonise the Chagos Archipelago and return Chagos to Mauritius. He said that "What happened to the Chagos islanders was utterly disgraceful. [They were] forcibly removed from their own islands, unfortunately, by this country. The right of return to those islands is absolutely important as a symbol of the way in which we wish to behave in international law."

=== Cuba ===
Corbyn is a longtime supporter of the Cuba Solidarity Campaign, which campaigns against the US embargo against Cuba and supports the Cuban Revolution. In November 2016, following the death of former communist President of Cuba Fidel Castro, while saying that Castro had "flaws" and was a "huge figure of modern history, national independence and 20th Century socialism...Castro's achievements were many", Corbyn also praised his revolutionary "heroism". Internal Labour party critics of Corbyn accused him of glossing over Castro's human rights abuses.

=== Venezuela ===
When Hugo Chávez, the United Socialist Party President of Venezuela died in 2013, Corbyn tweeted that "Hugo Chavez showed that the poor matter and wealth can be shared. He made massive contributions to Venezuela & a very wide world". In 2014, Corbyn congratulated Chávez's successor, President Nicolás Maduro on his election to the presidency. In February 2019, he said that "intervention in Venezuela and sanctions against the government of Nicolás Maduro were wrong" and that "only Venezuelans have the right to decide their own destiny". He was against outside interference in Venezuela, "whether from the US or anywhere else". He said there "needed to be dialogue and a negotiated settlement to overcome the crisis".

When the US attacked Venezuela in 2026, Corbyn repeatedly criticised the US for their actions and the British government for their lack of condemnation.

=== Kurdistan and Kurds ===
In 1988, Corbyn was one of the first MPs to raise the issue of Saddam Hussein's Halabja chemical attack against the Kurdish people, at a time when Hussein was still an ally of the west. In the aftermath, he called upon the Tory government to institute sanctions against Iraq and Iran to end the Iran–Iraq War, and to end the use of chemical weapons against the Kurds.

In 2016, Corbyn said that "if peace is wanted in the region, the Kurdish people's right to self-determination must be accepted." Referring to the Kurdish nationalist leader Abdullah Öcalan, he remarked "if there will be a peace process and solution, Öcalan must be free and at the table."

At Chatham House in 2017 he was asked if he would "condemn the genocide which is going on against the Kurds in Syria and in Turkey," Corbyn responded with "I would be very strong with the Turkish government on its treatment of Kurdish people and minorities and the way in which it's denied them their decency and human rights." On warfare by Turkey against the Kurds, Corbyn stated, "If arms are being used to oppress people internally in violation of international law then they simply should not be supplied to them."

== Immigration ==
In 2016, Corbyn said that the EU allowed migrants to undercut UK workers' wages and called for an EU-wide minimum wage that would be tied to living costs.

== Accusations of antisemitism ==
Corbyn's critics, including British Orthodox rabbi Jonathan Sacks, former Chief Rabbi of the United Hebrew Congregations of the Commonwealth, have accused him of new antisemitism in relation to past associations and comments as well as his handling of allegations within the party while defenders have cited his support for Jews against racism. These associations included hosting a meeting where Holocaust survivor and anti-Zionist political activist Hajo Meyer compared Israeli actions in Gaza to elements of the Holocaust; Corbyn stated of this event, "In the past, in pursuit of justice for the Palestinian people and peace in Israel/Palestine, I have on occasion appeared on platforms with people whose views I completely reject. I apologise for the concerns and anxiety that this has caused." Corbyn attended "two or three" of the annual Deir Yassin Remembered commemorations in London, with Jewish fellow Labour MP Gerald Kaufman, organised by a group founded by Paul Eisen, who has denied the Holocaust, but it is not known whether Eisen attended the commemorations. Corbyn stated that he was unaware of the views expressed by Eisen, and had associated with Mayer and others with whom he disagreed in pursuit of progress in the Middle East.

Corbyn has been criticised for his defence of Palestinian-Israeli cleric and activist Raed Salah, who was arrested in 2011 due to a deportation order one day before he was due to attend a meeting with MPs including Corbyn. Salah was accused of spreading the "blood libel" (the myth that Jews in Europe had used children's blood in making holy bread), a claim which he strongly denied. He had also written an article suggesting that 4,000 "Jewish clerks" had been absent on the day of the 9/11 attacks, alluding to the conspiracy theory that the Israeli secret service Mossad was involved in the attack. In a statement, Salah condemned antisemitism and denied the accusation of blood libel, of which he was later convicted and sentenced to eight months in prison before he successfully appealed his deportation. Corbyn said that Salah was "a voice of the Palestinian people that needs to be heard" and accused then-Home Secretary Theresa May of giving "an executive detention order against him". Following Salah's successful appeal against deportation, Corbyn said he was looking forward to inviting the cleric to "tea on the House of Commons terrace, because you deserve it". A Labour source also stated in response, "Jeremy Corbyn is a determined supporter of justice for the Palestinian people and opponent of anti-Semitism. He condemns support for Palestinians being used as a mask for anti-Semitism and attempts to silence legitimate criticism of Israel by wrongly conflating it with anti-Semitism. There was widespread criticism of the attempt to deport Raed Salah, including from Jews for Justice for Palestinians, and his appeal against deportation succeeded on all grounds."

In 2012, the artist Mear One publicised on social media that his mural Freedom for Humanity, about exploitative bankers and industrialists, was being censored; Corbyn responded at the time by questioning the removal of the artwork, and then in 2018 was criticised by Jewish leaders for not recognising an antisemitic canard. In response to that criticism, Corbyn said he regretted that he "did not look more closely at the image", agreed it was antisemitic, and endorsed the decision to remove it. In 2020, the Equality and Human Rights Commission (EHRC) revealed that an antisemitism complaint had been made against Corbyn in April 2018 over his defence of the mural and that members of Corbyn's office "directly interfered in the decision not to investigate the case", an example of political interference which the EHRC concluded was "unlawful". Corbyn was criticised for a 2013 speech in which he spoke of certain Zionists who had "berated" the Palestinian speaker at a meeting, "they don't want to study history and secondly having lived in this country for a very long time, probably all their lives, they don't understand English irony either" (used by the speaker). The remarks were criticised for appearing to perpetuate the antisemitic canard that Jews fail or refuse to integrate into wider society. Corbyn responded that he was using Zionist "in the accurate political sense and not as a euphemism for Jewish people". Jonathan Sacks, a former Chief Rabbi, described the remark as "the most offensive statement made by a senior British politician since Enoch Powell's 1968 'rivers of blood' speech."

Following coverage of alleged antisemitic statements by party members, Corbyn commissioned the Chakrabarti Inquiry and supported changes to the party's rules and procedures to make hate speech and expressions of racism a disciplinary offence. In July 2018, Labour, with Corbyn's support, agreed a code of conduct which excluded or amended some of the examples from the IHRA Working Definition of Antisemitism relating to criticism of Israel. Britain's three main Jewish newspapers jointly called a Corbyn-led government an "existential threat to Jewish life" in Britain. Corbyn was accosted by Labour MP Margaret Hodge in the Commons; she then told him she believed he was "an antisemitic racist" because of his perceived reluctance to adopt the International Holocaust Remembrance Alliance's definition of antisemitism in full. In an opinion piece for The Guardian, Hodge explained that, for her, as the daughter of Holocaust survivors, the issue of racism was personal. The party began disciplinary action against Hodge but dropped the charges in August, claiming she had "expressed regret for the manner in which she raised her views", but Hodge denied this was the case.

In 2019, Corbyn was criticised for a foreword he wrote in 2011 for a republication of the 1902 book Imperialism: A Study by John A. Hobson, as the book contains the antisemitic assertion that finance was controlled "by men of a single and peculiar race, who have behind them many centuries of financial experience" who "are in a unique position to control the policy of nations". In his foreword, he called the book a "great tome" and "brilliant, and very controversial at the time". Corbyn responded that the language used to describe minorities in Hobson's work is "absolutely deplorable", but he stated that his foreword analysed "the process which led to the first world war" which he saw as the subject of the book and not Hobson's language.

In 2020, former Corbyn advisor Andrew Murray suggested Corbyn may have struggled to empathise with the Jewish community during his leadership, stating: "He is very empathetic, Jeremy, but he's empathetic with the poor, the disadvantaged, the migrant, the marginalised. [...] Happily, that is not the Jewish community in Britain today." Corbyn raised the question in internal debates of whether there was a risk of giving the Jewish community 'special treatment'. In 2021 Corbyn was a guest at the Cambridge Union. He was asked by the society's President, Joel Rosen, what he had done to stop Luciana Berger, a Jewish MP for Liverpool Wavertree, from being "hounded out" of the Labour party. Corbyn replied that Berger "was not hounded out of the party. She unfortunately decided to resign from the party."

A September 2018 poll carried out by polling firm Survation, on behalf of the Jewish Chronicle, found that 86% of British Jews and 39% of the British public believed Corbyn to be antisemitic. A poll conducted in 2021 by YouGov, again on behalf of the Jewish Chronicle, found that 70% of Labour members dismissed the idea that the party had a problem with antisemitism, and 72% believe Corbyn should not have been expelled from the party.

In November 2019, a number of British public figures urged voters in a letter published in The Guardian to reject Corbyn in the impending general election, alleging an "association with antisemitism". The Labour Party responded by noting their robust actions in dealing with it and that several of the signatories had themselves been accused of antisemitism, Islamophobia and misogyny and/or were Conservatives and Liberal Democrats.
