= Anastasia Nesvetailova =

Belarusian-born British economist and diplomat

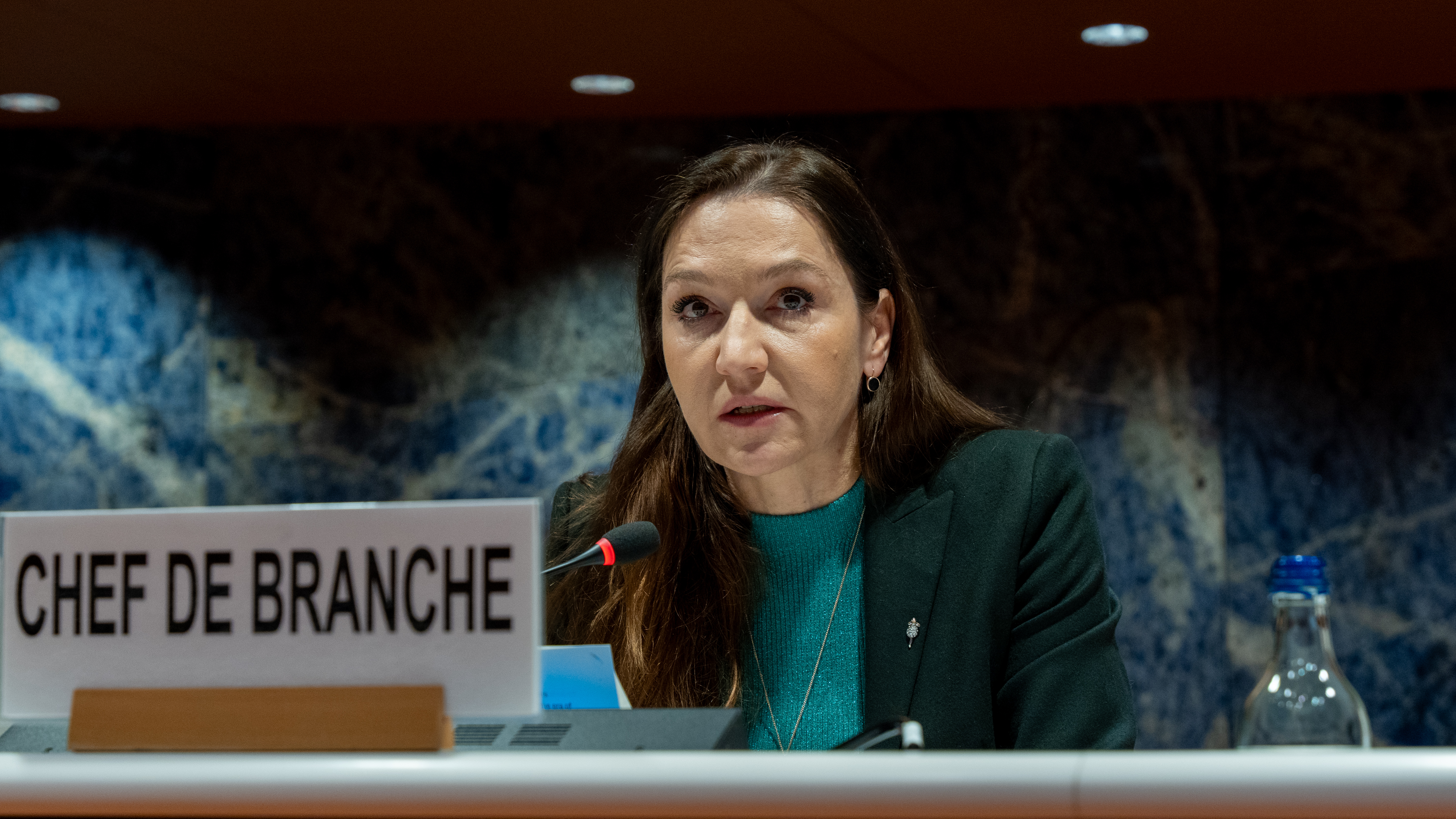
- Anastasia Nesvetailova at UN Trade and Development Board session in 2025, Geneva, Switzerland
- Born: Belarus
- Education: Aberystwyth University (PhD in International political economy)
- Known for: Financial crisis Food sovereignty
- Scientific career
- Institutions: City St George's, University of London, UN Conference on Trade and Development (UNCTAD)

Anastasia Nesvetailova, also written as Anastasia Nesvetaïlova, is a Belarusian-born British academic and diplomat. She is a leading economist at in the area of macroeconomics and international development at the UN Conference on Trade and Development (UNCTAD).

== Early work and career ==
Nesvetailova studied economics at the Belarusian State University, later completing a master's degree at the University of Manchester and her PhD in International Policical Economy (IPE) at the Aberystwyth University. In 2007, she joined City St George's, University of London, where she taught as professor of International Political Economy. In 2015 and 2016, she served on an advisory panel to the UK Shadow Chancellor of the Exchequer. From 2017 to 2019, she advised OECD’s work on the risks of illicit finance in energy trading through a research project.

She was elected Fellow of the Academy of Social Sciences in 2019.

== Timely warning about the 2008 Financial Crisis ==
Nesvetailova is credited for having warned in her academic work about excessive leverage in the run up to the 2008 financial crisis. In her 2020 book Sabotage , Nesvetailova and co-author Ronen Palan call for a radical simplifaction of the financial system to prevent the repeat of the 2008 financial crisis. They draw on the work of Thorstein Veblen to draw attention to the misrepresenation and obstruction practices in which modern financial institutions routinely engage.

== Analysis of global food supply chains ==
In a 2025 UNCTAD report co-authored by Nesvetailova, the international organization warned against the concertation in the food trading markets, with ABCD companies (Archer-Daniels-Midland Company, Bunge, Cargill and Louis Dreyfus), control most of the food markets, including technology and logistics. Nesvetailova warned that if the companies collapse the impact could be greater than the financial crisis of 2008 because it will affect food supply. This will also give the ABCD companies a means to pressure governments for bailouts. Nesvetailova urged governments to urgently address “food sovereignty” concerns stemming from the concentration of power over food supply chains in the hands of a handful of commodity traders.

== Personal life ==
Nesvetailova is married to economist Ronen Palan.

== Books ==
- Nesvetailova, Anastasia (2007). Fragile Finance: Debt, Speculation and Crisis in the Age of Global Credit.
- Nesvetailova, Anastasia (2010). Financial Alchemy in Crisis: The End of Liquidity Illusion. Pluto PRess. ISBN 9780745328775.
- Nesvetailova, Anastasia; Palan, Ronen (2020). Sabotage: The Business of Finance. Penguin. ISBN 9780141986241.
