= Ann Pettifor =

British economist

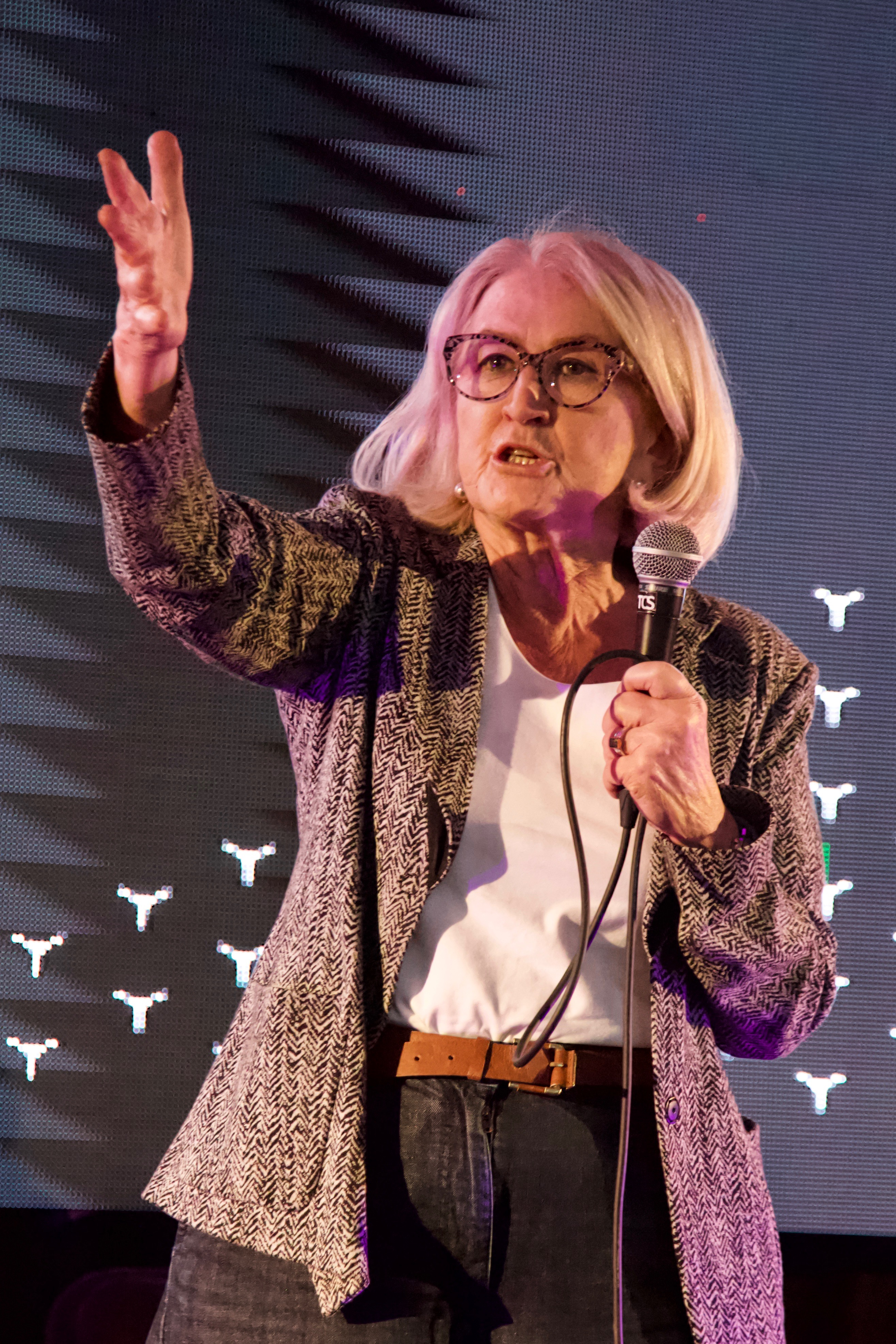
- Ann Pettifor speaking at The World Transformed 2018
- Born: 1947 (age 78–79); South Africa

Academic work
- Discipline: sovereign debt, monetary economics, A Green New Deal
- School or tradition: Keynesian economics
- Institutions: Director of Policy Research in Macroeconomics (PRIME)
- Notable ideas: Predicting the 2008 financial crisis
- Website: www.annpettifor.com

Ann Pettifor (born February 1947) is a British economist who advises governments and organisations. She has published several books. Her work focuses on the global financial system, sovereign debt restructuring, international finance and sustainable development. She was one of the leaders of the Jubilee 2000 debt cancellation campaign.

She is the director of Policy Research In Macroeconomics (PRIME) a network of economists researching Keynesian monetary theory and policies, an honorary research fellow at the Political Economy Research Centre at City, University of London (CITYPERC), Chair of the Political Economy Research Centre's Advisory Board at Goldsmiths, a fellow of the New Economics Foundation, a director of Advocacy International and a trustee of the PREP Foundation for pluralist economics. Pettifor is a member of the Green New Deal Group of economists, environmentalists and entrepreneurs.

== Biography ==
Lynda Ann Pettifor was born in South Africa in February 1947, and graduated with a degree in politics and economics from the University of the Witwatersrand. In the 1980s she held several posts as adviser to Frances Morrell, the leader of the Inner London Education Authority and later advised Greater London Council, Ken Livingstone. She also advised the Right Hon. Margaret Beckett MP who went on to serve in the 1997 Labour government. She also worked as a lobbyist for Ian Greer Associates.

Pettifor co-founded the Jubilee 2000 worldwide campaign for the cancellation of the debts of the poorest countries. In 1998 Jubilee 2000 organised a human chain of approximately 70,000 people, which surrounded the 1998 G8 summit in Birmingham, United Kingdom. In 1999 at the Cologne G8 Summit the G8 agreed to write off approximately $100 billion of third world debt owed by 37 countries, in large part due to the campaign. Jubilee 2000 had supporters including Pope John Paul II, Muhammad Ali, Bono, Tony Blair, Gordon Brown and Bill Clinton. The Independent would later describe her work on the campaign as 'genius'.

At the conclusion of the Jubilee 2000 campaign Pettifor joined the New Economics Foundation in London where she headed their research unit on global macro-economics.

Pettifor became a member of the Green New Deal Group of economists, environmentalists and entrepreneurs that published The Green New Deal in July 2008. The group argued that "The triple crunch of financial meltdown, climate change and ‘peak oil’ has its origins firmly rooted in the current model of globalisation. Financial deregulation has facilitated the creation of almost limitless credit. With this credit boom have come irresponsible and often fraudulent patterns of lending, creating inflated bubbles in assets such as property, and powering environmentally unsustainable consumption."

In the 2010 general election Pettifor attempted to stand for Parliament as a Labour candidate and was shortlisted in the North West Durham selection process but lost to Pat Glass. She has also unsuccessfully stood as a local election candidate for the West End ward on Westminster City Council.

As a director of Advocacy International she worked on designing and promoting the MamaYe campaign together with Options Consultancy Services. Working in five African countries the campaign makes life-saving changes for mothers and babies during pregnancy and childbirth.

In September 2015, she was appointed to the British Labour Party's Economic Advisory Committee, convened by Shadow Chancellor John McDonnell and reporting to Labour Party Leader Jeremy Corbyn, regarding which she stated that she was honoured to be asked to serve with such distinguished colleagues and that she hoped to play her part in overturning the Chancellor's deficit fetishism, and his employment of it as a smokescreen for an attack on the state. She currently resides in London, England.

Pettifor contributed an article to the Labour in the City Anthology in October 2018, which was launched at the City Corporation by Alistair Darling. Pettifor argues that far more radical reforms are needed to prevent a recurrence of the 2008 crisis.

== Awards ==
Pettifor was granted the freedom of the city of Callao in Peru in 1999 (for her work on debt cancellation for Peru); and the Pax Christi International Peace Award in 2000. In 2001 she was awarded an honorary doctorate by Lord Patten, Vice-Chancellor of Newcastle University, and in the same year was honoured with a Masters of Letters Degree (a Lambeth Degree) by the Archbishop of Canterbury. The President of Nigeria, President Obasanjo made her a Member of the Order of the Niger (MON) for her work in leading the campaign to write off billions of dollars of debt owed by Africa's poorest countries. In 2018, she was awarded with the Hannah Arendt Prize.

== Works ==
- 1996: Debt, the Most Potent Form of Slavery: : a discussion of the role of Western lending policies in subordinating the economies of poor countries. Debt Crisis Network.
- 2000: Kicking the Habit: Finding a Lasting Solution to Addictive Lending and Borrowing and Its Corrupting Side-Effects (Joseph Hanlon & Angela Travis). Jubilee 2000 Coalition.
- 2001: It Takes Two to Tango: Creditor Co-Responsibility for Argentina's Crisis – and the Need for Independent Resolution (with Liana Cisneros & Alejandro Olmos). New Economics Foundation.
- 2002: Chapter 9/11?: Resolving International Debtcrises – The Jubilee Framework for International Insolvency. New Economics Foundation. ISBN 978-1-899407-44-6
- 2003: The Real World Economic Outlook Palgrave Macmillan. ISBN 978-1-4039-1794-2
- 2006: The Coming First World Debt Crisis. Palgrave Macmillan. ISBN 978-0-230-00784-0
- 2008: The Green New Deal – Joined up policies to solve the triple crunch of credit crises, climate change and high oil prices New Economics Foundation. ISBN 978-1-904882-35-0
- 2013: National Plan for the UK: From Austerity to the Age of the Green New Deal New Economics Foundation
- 2014: Just Money: How Society Can Break the Despotic Power of Finance. Commonwealth Publishing.
- 2017: The Production of Money – How to Break the Power of Bankers, Verso ISBN 9781786631374
- 2019: The Case for the Green New Deal. Verso ISBN 9781788738156
- 2026: The Global Casino: How Wall Street Gambles with People and the Planet. Verso ISBN 978-1804297223
