= University of Sheffield Management School =

School in United Kingdom

Coordinates: 53°22′57.7″N 1°29′57.6″W

Sheffield University Management School is an AMBA, AACSB and EQUIS accredited business school at the University of Sheffield in Sheffield, England. It is one of over 120 business schools in the world to have achieved triple accreditation.

The school has over 100 academics and nearly 2,000 undergraduate and postgraduate students.

In June 2013, the school moved into modern, newly refurbished facilities close to the University of Sheffield campus and Broomhill. It previously had dedicated learning and teaching spaces, a courtyard, cafe and employability hub. The cafe was closed in 2024 as part of cost saving measures across the university.

== Academic profile ==
=== Research ===
The school was ranked 25th in the UK for the quality of its research (GPA) in the Research Excellence Framework 2021 and seventh for research power.

It contains five research centres:

- Institute of Work Psychology (IWP)
- Centre for Regional Economic and Enterprise Development (CREED)
- Centre for Decent Work (CDW)
- Centre for Research into Accounting and Finance in Context (CRAFiC)
- Operations Management and Decision Science (OMDS)

The school also has two research groups:

- Behavioural Research for Inclusivity, Sustainability and Technological Transformation (BRISTT)
- Organization Studies (OS)

=== Teaching ===
The school has been a signatory o the UN's Principles of Responsible Management Education since 2008.

The school teaches three main undergraduate BA programmes: Accounting and Financial Management, Business Management and International Business Management. There are also a number of dual honours degree programmes available, for example, Accounting and Financial Management and Economics. Postgraduate degrees include a number of taught ]MSc courses and the MBA course, as well as research PhDs.
