= Simon Wren-Lewis =

British economist

Simon Wren-Lewis is a British economist. He is a professor of economic policy at the Blavatnik School of Government at Oxford University and a Fellow of Merton College.

== Education ==
Wren-Lewis was educated at Latymer Upper School, Hammersmith; Clare College, Cambridge (MA Economics); and Birkbeck College, London (MSc Economics).

== Career ==
Wren-Lewis worked for Her Majesty's Treasury as a budget-team member from 1974 to 1981. From 1976 to 1980, he worked for the National Income Forecasting Team as a senior economic assistant. From 1986 to 1990, he was a Senior Research Officer and Senior Research Fellow at the National Institute of Economic and Social Research.

From 1990 to 1995, Wren-Lewis was chair in macroeconomic modelling at the University of Strathclyde.

Wren-Lewis is currently an Oxford University professor of economics, teaching undergraduate and Masters of Philosophy (MPhil) students. He conducts research in economic methodology, macroeconomic theory and policy, and international macroeconomics.

On 27 September 2015, it was announced that he had been appointed to the British Labour Party's Economic Advisory Committee, convened by Shadow Chancellor John McDonnell and reporting to Labour Party Leader Jeremy Corbyn.

Wren-Lewis writes a regular blog mainly macro. A common theme on the blog is his concept of "mediamacro", the way the media talks about economics, and how it differs from what academic economists actually think. In particular the need to focus in Government debt as a top priority.

== Selected bibliography ==
- Jim Hibberd; Simon Wren-Lewis (1978). A Study of UK Imports of Manufactures. H.M. Treasury.
- Simon Wren-Lewis (1981). The Role of Money in Determining Prices: A Reduced Form Approach. H.M. Treasury.
- Simon Wren-Lewis (1982). Model of Private Sector Earnings Behaviour. HM Treasury.
- Simon Wren-Lewis (1984). Policy Rules in an Open Economy Macroeconomic Model. National Institute of Economic and Social Research.
- S. G. Hall; Simon Wren-Lewis (1985). Output Expectations and Disequilibrium Adjustment in the Company Sector: A Short Summary of Some Recent Research at the National Institute. National Institute of Economic and Social Research.
- David A. Currie; Simon Wren-Lewis (1988). A Comparison of Alternative Regimes for International Macropolicy Co-ordination. National Institute of Economic and Social Research.
- David Currie; Simon Wren-Lewis (1988). Evaluation the Extended Target Zone Proposal for the G3. CEPR.
- Ray Barrell; Simon Wren-Lewis (1989). Fundamental Equilibrium Exchange Rates for the G7. Centre for Economic Policy Research.
- Reza Moghadam; Simon Wren-Lewis (1990). Are wages forward looking?. Centre for Labour Economics, London School of Economics.
- Simon Wren-Lewis; National Institute of Economic and Social Research (1990). Buffer Stocks and the Company Sector in Disequilibrium. National Institute of Economic and Social Research.
- Simon Wren-Lewis; Peter Westaway; Soterios Soteri; National Institute of Economic and Social Research (1990). Choosing the Rate: An Anlysis of Entry for Sterling Into the ERM. National Institute of Economic and Social Research.
- Simon Wren-Lewis (1990). Nominal inertia and Keynesian effects. National Institute of Economic and Social Research.
- Julia Darby; Jonathan Ireland; Simon Wren-Lewis; University of Strathclyde. International Centre for Macroeconomic Modelling (1995). Interest Rates, Vintages and the Natural Rate. University of Strathclyde, International Centre for Macroeconomic Modelling.
- Yue Ma; Koichrio Morikawa; Simon Wren-Lewis; University of Strathclyde. International Centre for Macroeconomic Modelling (1995). Integration of Japanese Foreign Direct Investment and Multinational Operations with the Global Market. International Centre for Macroeconomic Modelling, University of Strathclyde.
- Rebecca L. Driver; Simon Wren-Lewis; University of Exeter. Dept. of Economics (1996). European Monetary Union, Asymmetric Shocks and Inertia. Department of Economics, University of Exeter.
- Jonathan Ireland; Simon Wren-Lewis; University of Strathclyde. International Centre for Macroeconomic Modelling (1996). Exchange Rates, Nominal Inertia and Inflation. University of Strathclyde, International Centre for Macroeconomic Modelling.
- Campbell B. Leith; Paul Warren; Simon Wren-Lewis; University of Exeter. Dept. of Economics (1997). Interest Rates and the Price Level. Department of Economics, University of Exeter.
- Simon Wren-Lewis; Rebecca Driver (1998). Real Exchange Rates for the Year 2000. Peterson Institute. ISBN 978-0-88132-253-8.
- Campbell Leith; Simon Wren-Lewis (1999). Interactions Between Monetary and Fiscal Policy Rules. University of Exeter, Department of Economics.
- Rebecca Driver; Simon Wren-Lewis (1999). New Trade Theory and Aggregate Export Equations: An Application of Panel Cointegration. University of Exeter, Department of Economics.
- Campbell Leith; Simon Wren-Lewis; University of Glasgow. Dept. of Economics (2001). Compatibility Between Monetary and Fiscal Policy Under EMU. University of Glasgow, Department of Economics.
- Campbell Leith; Simon Wren-Lewis (2002). Taylor Rules in the Open Economy. Department of Economics, University of Glasgow.
- Simon Wren-Lewis; Reserve Bank of New Zealand. Economic Dept (2004). A model of equilibrium exchange rates for the New Zealand and Australian dollars. Economics Dept., Reserve Bank of New Zealand.
- Tatiana Kirsanova; David Vines; Simon Wren-Lewis (2006). Fiscal Policy and Macroeconomic Stability Within a Currency Union. Centre for Economic Policy Research.
- Tatiana Kirsanova; David Vines; Simon Wren-Lewis (2006). Inflation Bias with Dynamic Phillips Curves. Centre for Economic Policy Research.
- Simon Wren-Lewis; Campbell Leith (2007). Fiscal Sustainability in a New Keynesian Model. Department of Economics, University of Oxford.
- Andreas Schabert; Armando José Garcia Pires; Elhanan Helpman; Nick Bloom, Olof Åslund, Steffen Hörnig, Tatiana Kirsanova, Xavier Vives, Yuriy Gorodnichenko, David Vines, John Van Reenen, John Östh, Klara Sabirianova Peter, Sweder van Wijnbergen, Simon Wren-Lewis, Yves Zenou (2006). Public Sector Pay and Corruption: Measuring Bribery from Micro Data. Centre for Economic Policy Research.
- Simon Wren-Lewis; Tatiana Kirsanova (2007). Optimal Fiscal Feedback on Debt in an Economy with Nominal Rigidities. Department of Economics, University of Oxford.
- Simon Wren-Lewis; Campbell Leith (2007). The Optimal Monetary Policy Response to Exchange Rate Misalignments. Department of Economics, University of Oxford.
- Simon Wren-Lewis (2009). The Possible Macroeconomic Impact on the UK of an Influenza Pandemic. Department of Economics, University of Oxford.
- Simon Wren-Lewis (2009). Internal Consistency, Nominal Inertia and the Microfoundation of Macroeconomics. Department of Economics, University of Oxford.
- Fabian Eser; Simon Wren-Lewis; Campbell Leith (2009). When is Monetary Policy All We Need?. Department of Economics, University of Oxford.
- Simon Wren-Lewis; Campbell Leith; Ioana Moldovan (2011). Debt Stabilization in a Non-Ricardian Economy. Department of Economics, University of Oxford.
