= Inventing the Future: Postcapitalism and a World Without Work =

2015 monograph by Nick Srnicek and Alex Williams

- Authors: Nick Srnicek & Alex Williams
- Cover artist: Michael Oswell
- Language: English
- Genre: Politics, economics
- Published: 2015, London
- Publisher: Verso Books
- Publication place: United Kingdom
- Media type: Print (paperback), ebook
- Pages: 245
- ISBN: 978-1-7847-8096-8
- Website: www.versobooks.com/en-gb/products/148-inventing-the-future

Inventing the Future: Postcapitalism and a World Without Work is a 2015 monograph by Nick Srnicek and Alex Williams, published by Verso Books. Positing that the dominant form of left-wing politics has been unable to deal with capitalism, Srnicek and Williams argue for a change in strategy and a post-scarcity economy based on automation, reduced working hours, and universal basic income.

== Background ==
The book expands upon Srnicek and Wiliams' "Manifesto for an Accelerationist Politics", which established left-wing accelerationism in 2013. However, the term "accelerationism" was dropped, with Srnicek stating "It's been too popularised. And we don't just want everything to go faster, anyway. Arguing for a shorter working week is arguing for people's lives to slow down.

== Synopsis ==
The book begins (chapters 1–2) by critiquing dominant left-wing thinking in the West, suggesting that since the cultural upheavals of the 1960s it has been characterised by a "folk politics" which aims to bring politics down to the "human scale". By emphasising temporal, spatial, and conceptual immediacy, folk politics tends to privilege reacting to change (through protest and resistance) over imagining new long-term goals; the immediate and tangible over the abstract; personal involvement in direct action over institutional responses; single issues over complex strategies; horizontal organising over hierarchical; and the local over the large-scale. While arguing that these approaches are important and can at times be effective, Srnicek and Williams argue that they are insufficient to tackle global capitalism and specifically neoliberalism.

In chapter 3, Srnicek and Williams contrast left-wing folk politics with the success of neoliberalism in achieving global cultural hegemony. This is illustrated by the long-term, top-down strategising characterised by the Walter Lippmann Colloquium and Mont Pelerin Society, the development of networks of think-tanks, and positioning of neoliberal ideas and thinkers in government and media. This strategy enabled neoliberals to offer a set of ready-made policies to leaders looking for new ideas in the wake of the collapse of the Bretton Woods system and the 1970s oil shocks. Srnicek and Williams suggest that the Left needs to adopt similar strategies. Accordingly, in chapter 4 they argue that the Left needs to offer a positive vision of a new modernity, embracing the importance of dismantling hierarchies of gender and race while also accepting that promoting universal human values is necessary to achieve a progressive vision of the future and positive freedom.

Chapter 5, 'The Future isn't Working', identifies a crisis in capitalism's ability (and willingness) to employ all members of society, arguing that "there is a growing population of people that are situated outside formal, waged work, making do with minimal welfare benefits, informal subsistence work, or by illegal means". Chapter 6 looks towards a post-scarcity economy and argues that a 'Mont Pelerin of the Left' should press for:

1. Full automation of as much work as possible.
2. The reduction of the working week, redistributing the remaining work more equitably.
3. The provision of an unconditional and generous income for all citizens.
4. The diminishment of the work ethic.

Srnicek and Williams argue that it is necessary to raise the costs of labour in order to incentivise investment in labour-saving technologies, envisaging a positive feedback loop between a tighter supply of labour and technological advancement. Chapter 7 argues that to achieve these goals, the Left must invest in establishing a new hegemonic status for these ideas, building on the successes of capitalism, repurposing its structures, and investing in scholarly research and the modelling of emergent policies.

The final chapter argues that an 'anti-work' or 'post-work' politics—providing a clear vision of a future where people work less—should appeal to a broad enough range of different interest groups to be the basis for a populist movement. The chapter sketches how this populism needs to be harnessed to get post-work politics into mainstream media, intellectual life, trade unions, and political parties, and how the pressure points where direct action can be targeted have changed as capitalism has undermined the power of organised labour to disrupt production.

== Responses ==
In November 2015, the book was the subject of a symposium, involving its authors and a number of other thinkers who presented critical responses to the book. The proceedings were published in blog format at the academic International Relations blog The Disorder of Things. In 2018, Jon Cruddas characterised the book as "a genuinely audacious, supremely confident intervention in terms of its intellectualism and its presentation of a highly specific future for the left. It has caught a wave and helped to re-populate the left's post-crash void and jettison late New Labour managerialism." However, he also argued that Inventing the Future and Paul Mason's PostCapitalism dispensed with ideas of humanism that, he claimed, should be central to a left-wing project: "these books have been treated uncritically despite the reappearance of anti-humanist thinking within the left. Humanism needs to be defended; or, as Orwell wrote, "the job of the thinking person is not to reject socialism but to make up his mind to humanise it"". In April 2020 a movie using the book as a basis was released.

== Reviews ==
- Heller, Nathan (August 21, 2017). "Out of action : do protests work?". The Critics. A Critic at Large. The New Yorker. Vol. 93, no. 24. pp. 70–77.
- Jevons, Rich (12 November 2015). "Book Review: Inventing the Future". The State of the Arts.
- Lawson, Neal (12 February 2016). "Review of Inventing the Future". Compass.
- Lowrie, Ian (8 January 2016). "On Algorithmic Communism". Los Angeles Review of Books.

== See also ==
- Criticism of capitalism
- Critique of work
- Post-capitalism
- Post-work society
- Universal basic income
