= Post-capitalism =

State whose economic system is no longer a form of capitalism

Post-capitalism is in part a hypothetical state in which the economic systems of the world can no longer be described as forms of capitalism. Various individuals and political ideologies have speculated on what would define such a world. According to classical Marxist and social evolutionary theories, post-capitalist societies may come about as a result of spontaneous evolution as capitalism becomes obsolete. Others propose models to intentionally replace capitalism, most notably socialism, communism, anarchism, nationalism and degrowth.

== History ==
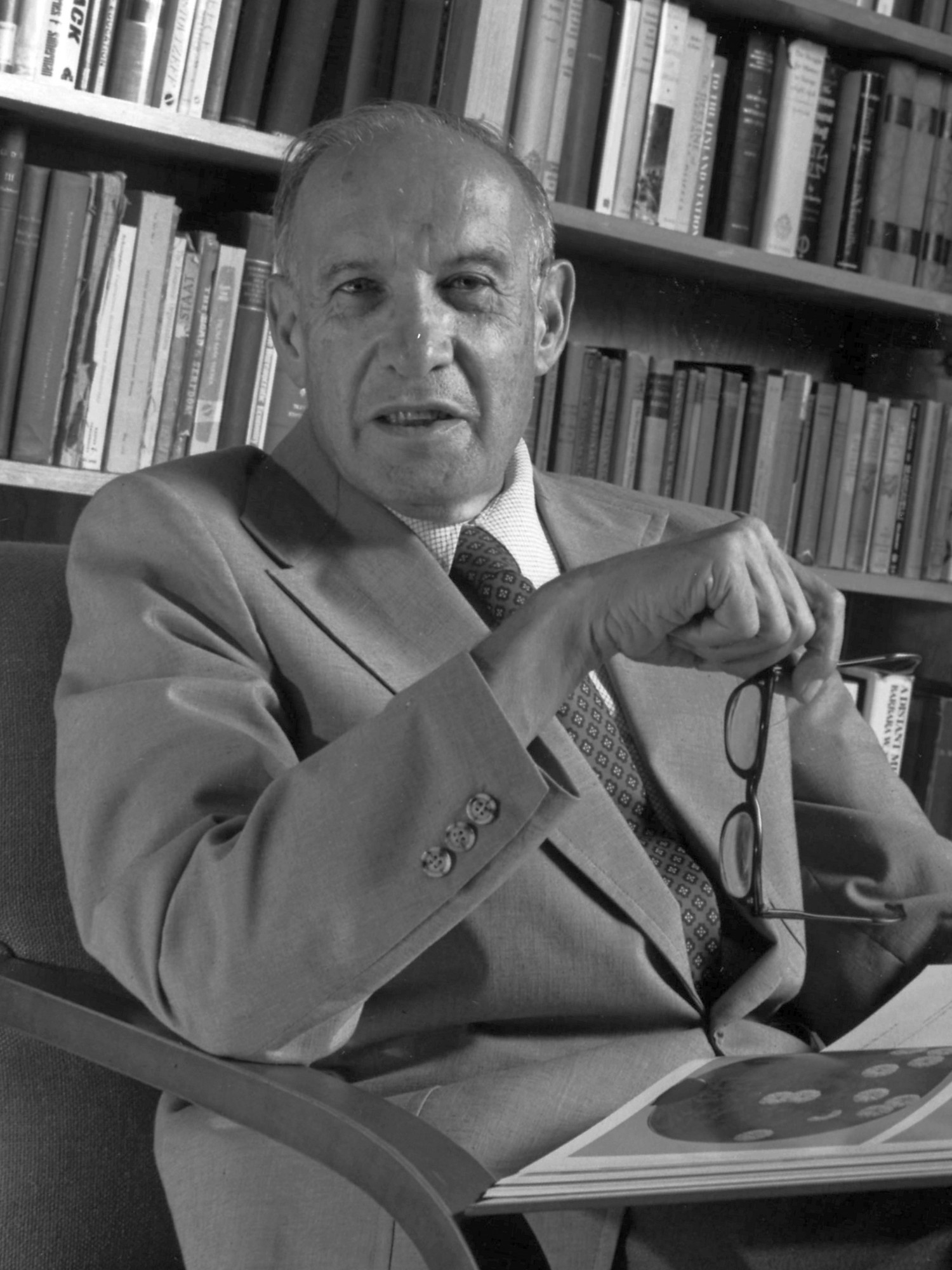
In 1993, Peter Drucker outlined a possible evolution of capitalistic society in his book Post-Capitalist Society.

In 1993, Peter Drucker outlined a possible evolution of capitalistic society in his book Post-Capitalist Society. This states that knowledge, rather than capital, land, or labor, is the new basis of wealth. The classes of a fully post-capitalist society are expected to be divided into knowledge workers or service workers, in contrast to the capitalists and proletarians of a capitalist society. Drucker estimated the transformation to post-capitalism would be completed in 2010–2020. Drucker also argued for rethinking the concept of intellectual property by creating a universal licensing system.

In 2015, according to Paul Mason, several factors — the rise of income inequality, repeating cycles of boom and bust, and capitalism's contributions to climate change — led economists, political thinkers and philosophers to start seriously considering how a post-capitalistic society would look and function. Post-capitalism is expected to be made possible with further advances in automation and information technology – both of which are effectively causing production costs to trend toward zero.

Nick Srnicek and Alex Williams identify a crisis in capitalism's ability and willingness to employ all members of society, arguing that: "there is a growing population of people that are situated outside formal, waged work, with minimal welfare benefits, informal subsistence work, or by illegal means".

== Variations ==
=== Heritage check system ===
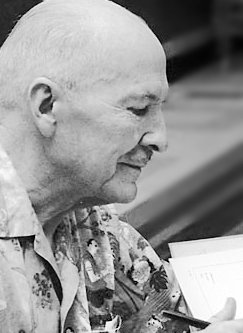
Robert Heinlein

Heritage check system is a socioeconomic plan that retains a market economy but removes fractional reserve lending power from banks and limits government printing of money to offset deflation. Money printed is used to buy materials to back the currency and pay for government programs in lieu of taxes, with the remainder to be split evenly among all citizens to stimulate the economy (termed a "heritage check", for which the system is named). The original author of the idea, Robert Heinlein, stated in his book For Us, The Living: A Comedy of Customs, that the system would be self-reinforcing and would eventually result in regular heritage checks able to provide a modest living for most citizens.

=== Economic democracy ===
Economic democracy is a socioeconomic philosophy that establishes democratic control of firms by their workers and social control of investment by a network of public banks.

=== Participatory economy ===
In his book Of the People, By the People: The Case for a Participatory Economy, Robin Hahnel describes a post-capitalist economy called the participatory economy.

Hahnel argues that a participatory economy will return empathy to our purchasing choices. Capitalism removes the knowledge of how and by whom a product was made: "When we eat a salad the market systematically deletes information about the migrant workers who picked it".

=== Socialism ===
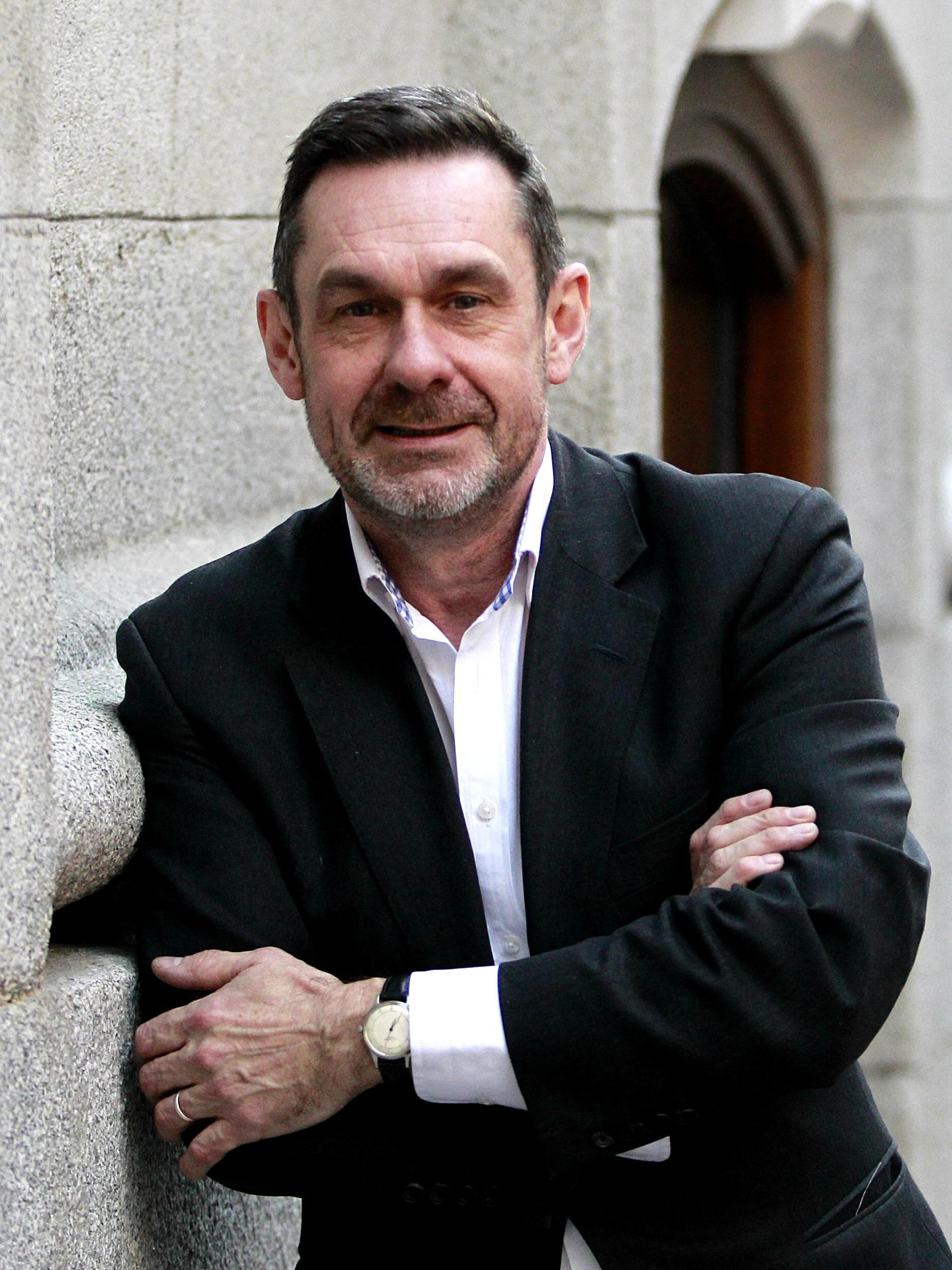
Paul Mason

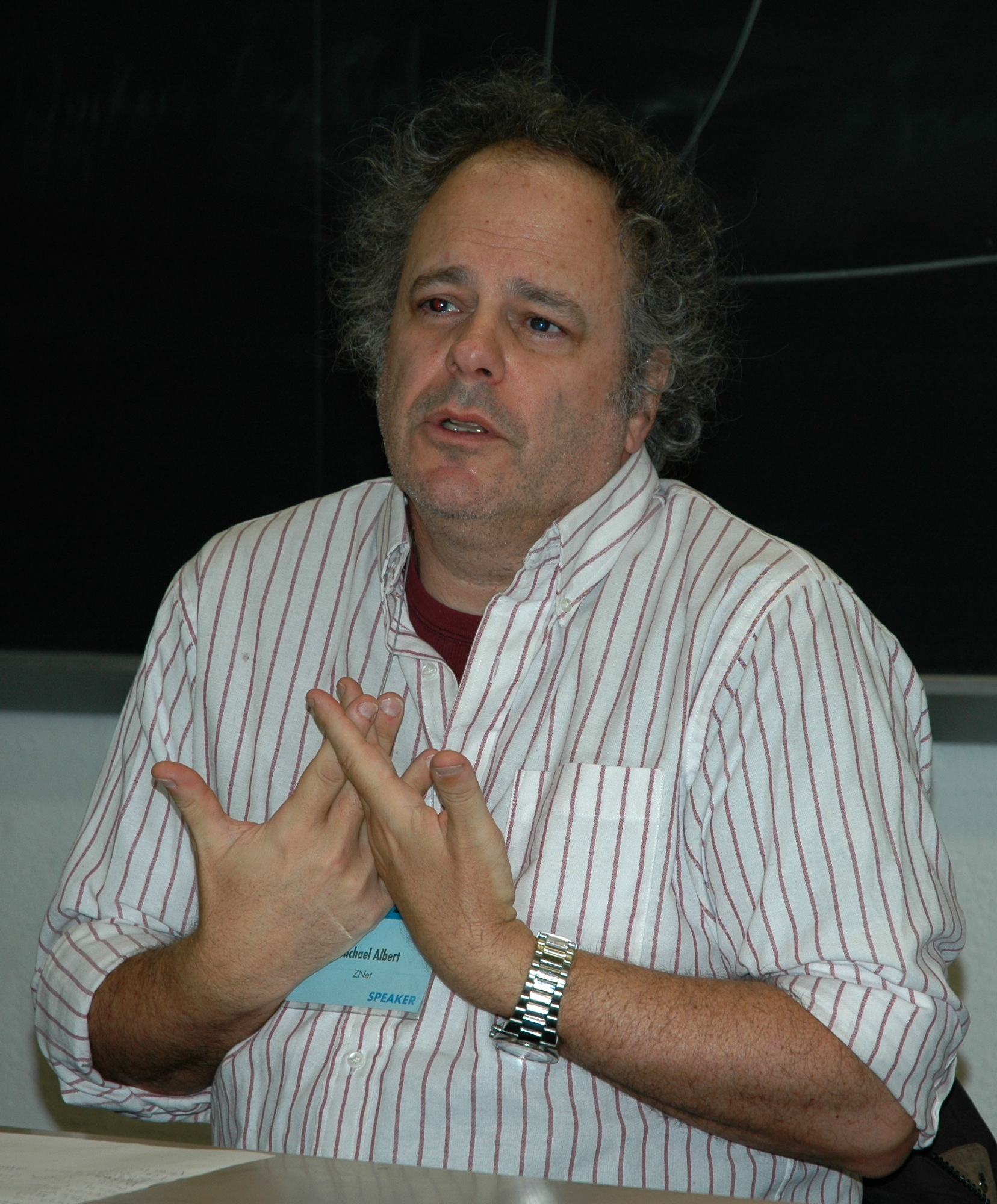
Michael Albert

Socialism often implies common ownership of companies and a planned economy, though as an inherently pluralistic ideology, it is argued whether either are essential features. In his book PostCapitalism: A Guide to our Future, Paul Mason argues that centralized planning, even with the advanced technology of today, is unachievable.

In UK politics, strands of Corbynism and the Labour party have adopted this 'post-capitalist' tendency.

=== Permaculture ===
Permaculture is defined by its co-originator Bill Mollison as: "The conscious design and maintenance of agriculturally productive systems which have the diversity, stability, and resilience of natural ecosystems".

=== PROUT ===
Progressive utilization theory (PROUT) is a socioeconomic and political philosophy created by the Indian philosopher and spiritual leader Prabhat Ranjan Sarkar in 1959. PROUT includes the decentralization of the economy; economic democracy; development of cooperatives; provision of all working members of society with five basic needs: food, clothing, shelter, education, medical care; and systematic solution of environmental problems through technological development and limitation of consumption.

=== Agrowth ===
Agrowth ("agnostic or atheistic about growth") is a concept in economic policy according to which it is preferable to be indifferent to the growth of gross domestic product (GDP growth) when devising policies to further economic and societal progress. The reasoning behind agrowth is that GDP growth does not correlate closely with such progress.

The concept has been particularly discussed in the context of environmental policy, where it is opposed to both green growth and degrowth. Agrowth is supported by many scientists.

For example, environmental economist Jeroen C. J. M. van den Bergh argues for an agnostic attitude toward economic growth. According to him, environmental policy should not be aimed at pursuing or avoiding growth in the hope of reducing environmental damage, but at direct deployment of effective instruments such as pricing externalities (for example, via environmental taxes or emission rights). Whether the economy grows, stagnates or shrinks as a result is of secondary importance.

=== Post-growth ===
Post-growth is an umbrella term that refers to a broad family of economic, ecological, and political perspectives responding to the limits-to-growth dilemma—the recognition that infinite economic growth is biophysically unsustainable on a finite planet. Central to post-growth thinking is the shift of the focus out of GDP growth as the main goal of the economy. Instead, well-being becomes the main objective. Post-growth puts emphasis on decoupling societal well-being from economic growth, advocating for the possibility of prosperity beyond growth.

Scholars define post-growth in different ways. Some describe it as comprising two main categories: degrowth (a stance advocating for a deliberate and equitable reduction in material consumption and economic activity) and agrowth (an agnostic stance towards economic growth, holding that policymakers should remain neutral about GDP growth because it may have either positive or negative effects on environmental or social objectives). According to others it serves as an umbrella term encompassing research in Doughnut and wellbeing economics, steady-state economics, and degrowth.

A systematic review of academic literature found that the distinction between degrowth and post-growth is often unclear, with many authors using post-growth as a catch-all term to avoid the strong connotations associated with degrowth.

=== Steady-state economy ===
A steady-state economy is an economy made up of a constant stock of physical wealth (capital) and a constant population size. In effect, such an economy does not grow in the course of time. The term usually refers to the national economy of a particular country, but it is also applicable to the economic system of a city, a region, or the entire world. Early in the history of economic thought, classical economist Adam Smith of the 18th century developed the concept of a stationary state of an economy: Smith believed that any national economy in the world would sooner or later settle in a final state of stationarity.

Since the 1970s, the concept of a steady-state economy has been associated mainly with the work of leading ecological economist Herman Daly. As Daly's concept of a steady-state includes the ecological analysis of natural resource flows through the economy, his concept differs from the original classical concept of a stationary state. One other difference is that Daly recommends immediate political action to establish the steady-state economy by imposing permanent government restrictions on all resource use, whereas economists of the classical period believed that the final stationary state of any economy would evolve by itself without any government intervention.

Critics of the steady-state economy usually object to it by arguing that resource decoupling, technological development, and the operation of market mechanisms are capable of overcoming resource scarcity, pollution, or population overshoot. On the other hand, proponents of the steady-state economy maintain that these objections remain insubstantial and mistaken, and that the need for a steady-state economy is becoming more compelling every day.

=== Degrowth ===
Degrowth aims to bring about a post-capitalist world through what Anitra Nelson describes as the reframing and recreation of economies so that they "respect the Earth's limits in order to achieve socio-political equity and ecological sustainability.' They note that degrowth is "distinctive within sustainability and justice movements due to a unique emphasis on growth as a driver of unsustainabilities and inequities." As such "Degrowth argues for a radical reduction in production and consumption, greater citizen participation in politics, and more diversity, especially within ecological systems and landscapes, along with a flourishing of creativity, care, and commoning — using renewable energy and materials.

==== Degrowth and MMT ====
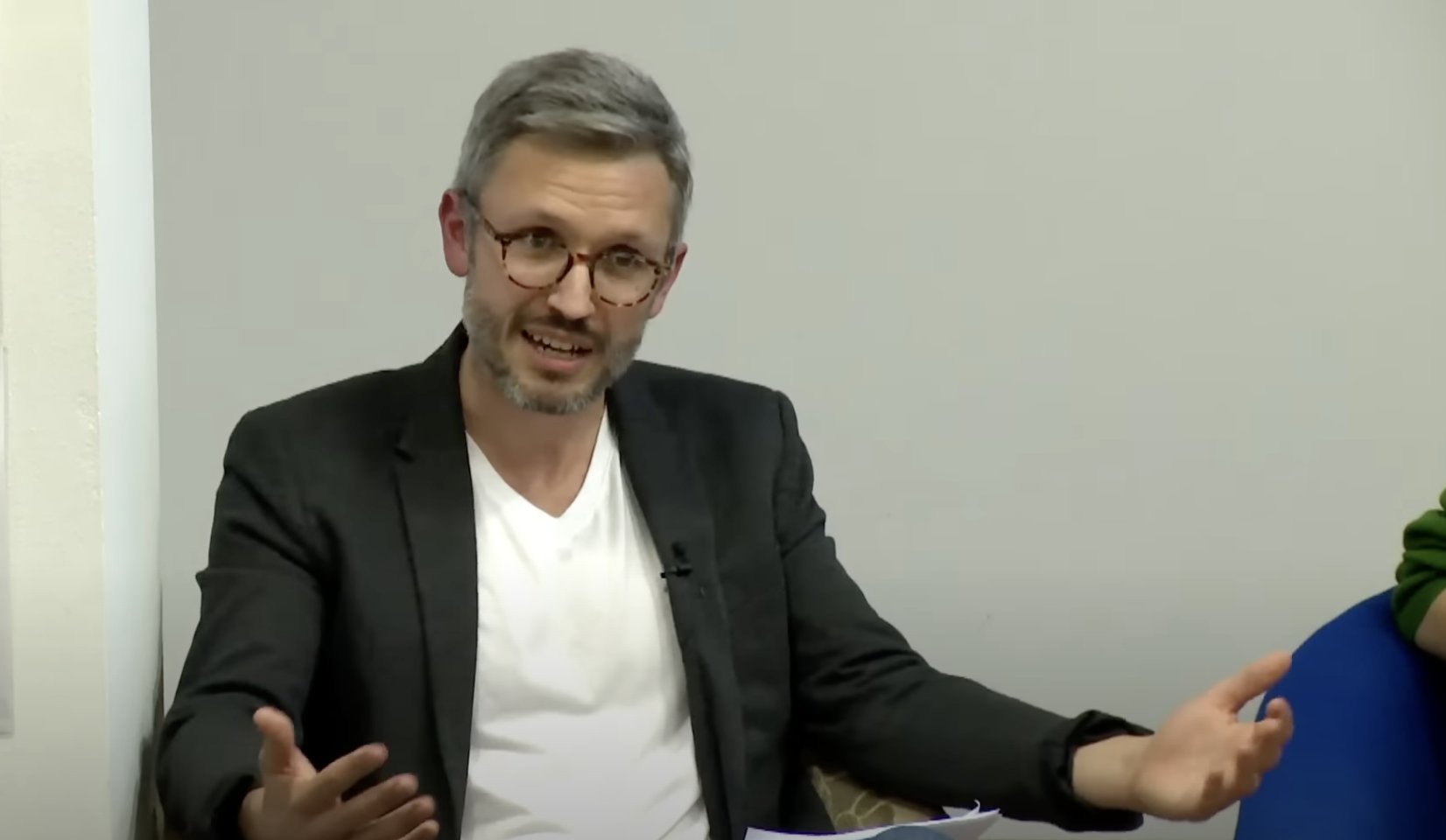
Jason Hickel at the University of Oxford

Modern monetary theory (MMT) could enhance the degrowth movement in transitioning to a "post-growth, post-capitalist economy", according to economic anthropologist Jason Hickel. Towards this end, he suggests that the power of "the government's role as the issuer of currency" could be utilized to bring the economy back into balance with the natural world while at the same time reducing economic inequality by providing high quality universal basic services, implementing the rapid development of renewable energy infrastructure to completely phase out fossil fuels in a shorter period of time, and establishing a public job guarantee for 30 hours a week at a living wage doing decommodified, socially useful work in the public services sector, and also useful work in renewable energy development and ecosystem restoration. Hickel notes that providing a living wage at 30 hours a week also has the added benefit of shifting income from capital to labor. Furthermore, he adds that taxation can be used to "reduce demand in order to bring resource and energy use down to target levels," and specifically to reduce the purchasing power of the wealthy.

== Technology as a driver of post-capitalism ==
=== Automation ===
Technological change that has driven unemployment has historically been due to 'mechanical-muscle' machines, which have reduced the need for human labor. Just as the use of horses for transport and other work was gradually made obsolete by the invention of the automobile, humans' jobs have also been affected throughout history. A modern example of this technological unemployment is the replacement of retail cashiers by self-service checkouts. The invention and development of 'mechanical-mind' processes or 'brain labor' is thought to threaten jobs at an unprecedented scale, with Oxford Professors Carl Benedikt Frey and Michael Osborne estimating that 47% of US jobs are at risk of automation.

=== Information technology ===
Post-capitalism is said to be possible due to major changes brought about by information technology in recent years. These changes have blurred the boundaries between work and free time and loosened the relationship between work and wages. Significantly, information is corroding the market's ability to form prices correctly. Information is abundant and information goods are freely replicable. Goods such as music, software or databases do have a production cost, but once made can be copied infinitely. If the normal price mechanism of capitalism prevails, then the price of any good which has essentially no cost of reproduction will fall towards zero. This lack of scarcity of those things is a problem in those models, which try to counter by developing monopolies in the form of giant tech companies to keep information scarce and commercial. But many significant commodities in the digital economy are now free and open-source, such as Linux, Firefox, Wikipedia and Open-source hardware.

Michel Bauwens and Vasilis Kostakis argue that open licensing does not by itself resist enclosure: the more permissive the sharing licence, the more easily start-ups and multinationals can build proprietary businesses atop the resulting commons, a dynamic they term the "communism of capital". They propose "open cooperativism", pairing commons-oriented peer production with the common ownership and governance structures of cooperatives, so that surplus flows back to the commons.

=== Cognitarism ===
In 2025, early theoretical frameworks such as Cognitarism proposed socio-economic systems where artificial cognition itself, rather than human labour, was positioned as the primary driver of value creation.

== See also ==
- Anti-capitalism
- Capitalist realism
- Commons-based peer production
- Criticism of capitalism
- Distributism
- Eco-communalism
- Economic history of the world
- Evolutionary economics
- Fully Automated Luxury Communism
- Historical materialism
- Late capitalism
- P2P economic system
- Post-democracy
- Post-industrial society
- Post-scarcity economy
- Post-work society
- Resource-based economy
- Sharing economy
- Social democracy
- Socialist calculation debate
- Tang ping ("lying flat")
- Technological unemployment § Solutions
- The Venus Project
- The Zeitgeist Movement
- Eco-economic decoupling
