= Graham Harman =

American philosopher (born 1968)

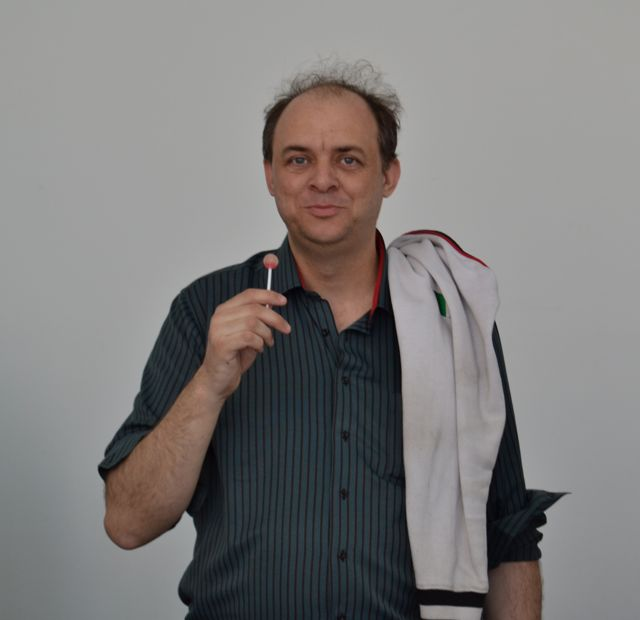
- Born: May 9, 1968 (age 58); Iowa City, Iowa, U.S.

Education
- Education: DePaul University (PhD, 1999)
- Thesis: Tool-being: Elements in a Theory of Objects (1999)
- Doctoral advisor: William McNeill

Philosophical work
- Era: Contemporary philosophy
- Region: Western philosophy
- School: Continental philosophy Speculative realism
- Institutions: American University in Cairo; Southern California Institute of Architecture
- Main interests: Metaphysics
- Notable ideas: Object-oriented ontology, vicarious causation

Graham Harman (born May 9, 1968) is an American philosopher. He is Distinguished Professor of Philosophy at the Southern California Institute of Architecture in Los Angeles. His work on the metaphysics of objects led to the development of object-oriented ontology. He is a central figure in the speculative realism trend in contemporary philosophy.

== Biography ==
Harman was born in Iowa City and raised in Mount Vernon, Iowa. His maternal grandparents were of Luxembourgian and Czech descent. He received a B.A. from St. John's College in Annapolis, Maryland in 1990 and went on to graduate school at Penn State University to earn a master's degree, studying under philosopher Alphonso Lingis, in 1991. While pursuing a Ph.D. at DePaul University, Harman worked as an online sports reporter, an experience which he credits for developing his writing style and productivity. After finishing his degree in 1999 he joined the Department of Philosophy at the American University in Cairo, where he taught from 2000-2016, leaving at the rank of Distinguished University Professor. He has also been a visiting faculty member at the University of Amsterdam, University of Innsbruck, University of Turin, and Yale University. Since 2013 he has been a faculty member at the European Graduate School.

== Philosophical work ==
Harman starts the development of his work with Martin Heidegger's concept of "tool-analysis" from Being and Time. To Harman, tool-analysis was a key discovery which establishes the groundwork for taking seriously the autonomous existence of objects and, in doing so, highlights deficiencies in phenomenology due to its subordination of objects to their use by or relationship with humans.

Harman is considered part of the speculative realism trend, a nebulous grouping of philosophers united by two perspectives: a rejection of anthropocentric "philosophies of access" which privilege the perspective of humans in relation to objects, and a support of metaphysical realism via rejection of "correlationism", an assumption in Post-Kantian philosophy that fellow speculative realist Quentin Meillassoux defines as "the idea according to which we only ever have access to the correlation between thinking and being, and never to either term considered apart from the other." Harman's object-oriented approach considers the life of objects to be fertile ground for a metaphysics that works to overcome anthropocentrism and correlationism.

According to Harman, everything is an object, whether it be a mailbox, a shadow, spacetime, a fictional character, or the Commonwealth of Nations. However, drawing on phenomenology, he does distinguish between two categories of objects: real objects and sensual objects (or intentional objects), which sets his philosophy apart from the flat ontology of Bruno Latour.

Harman defines real objects as inaccessible and infinitely withdrawn from all relations and then puzzles over how such objects can be accessed or enter into relations: "by definition, there is no direct access to real objects. Real objects are incommensurable with our knowledge, untranslatable into any relational access of any sort, cognitive or otherwise. Objects can only be known indirectly. And this is not just the fate of humans — it’s the fate of everything."

Central to Harman's philosophy is the idea that real objects are inexhaustible: "A police officer eating a banana reduces this fruit to a present-at-hand profile of its elusive depth, as do a monkey eating the same banana, a parasite infecting it, or a gust of wind blowing it from a tree. Banana-being is a genuine reality in the world, a reality never exhausted by any relation to it by humans or other entities." (Harman 2005: 74). Because of this inexhaustibility, claims Harman, there is a metaphysical problem regarding how two objects can ever interact. His solution is to introduce the notion of "vicarious causation", according to which objects can only ever interact on the inside of an "intention" (which is also an object).

Cutting across the phenomenological tradition, and especially its linguistic turn, Harman deploys a brand of metaphysical realism that attempts to extricate objects from their human captivity and metaphorically allude to a strange subterranean world of "vacuum-sealed" objects-in-themselves: "The comet itself, the monkey itself, Coca-Cola itself, resonate in cellars of being where no relation reaches."

Strongly sympathetic to panpsychism, Harman proposes a new philosophical discipline called "speculative psychology" dedicated to investigating the "cosmic layers of psyche" and "ferreting out the specific psychic reality of earthworms, dust, armies, chalk, and stone." Harman does not, however, unreservedly endorse an all-encompassing panpsychism and instead proposes a sort of 'polypsychism' that nonetheless must "balloon beyond all previous limits, but without quite extending to all entities". He continues by stating that "perceiving" and "non-perceiving" are not different kinds of objects, but can be found in the same entity at different times: "The important point is that objects do not perceive insofar as they exist, as panpsychism proclaims. Instead they perceive insofar as they relate."

Harman rejects scientism on account of its anthropocentrism: "For them, raindrops know nothing and lizards know very little, and some humans are more knowledgeable than others."

== Bibliography ==
=== Authored works ===
- 2002. Tool-Being: Heidegger and the Metaphysics of Objects (Open Court Publishing)
- 2005. Guerrilla Metaphysics: Phenomenology and the Carpentry of Things (Open Court Publishing)
- 2007. Heidegger Explained: From Phenomenon to Thing (Open Court Publishing)
- 2009. Prince of Networks: Bruno Latour and Metaphysics (re.press)
- 2010. Towards Speculative Realism: Essays and Lectures (Zero Books)
- 2010. Circus Philosophicus (Zero Books)
- 2010. L'objet quadruple (Presses Universitaires de France; republished in English as The Quadruple Object, 2011, Zero Books).
- 2011. The Prince and the Wolf: Latour and Harman at the LSE (Zero Books, with Bruno Latour and Peter Erdélyi)
- 2011. Quentin Meillassoux: Philosophy in the Making (Edinburgh University Press)
- 2012. Weird Realism: Lovecraft and Philosophy (Zero Books)
- 2013. Bells and Whistles: More Speculative Realism (Zero Books)
- 2014. Bruno Latour: Reassembling the Political (Pluto Press)
- 2016. Immaterialism: Objects and Social Theory (Polity Press)
- 2016. Dante's Broken Hammer: The Ethics, Aesthetics, and Metaphysics of Love (Repeater Books)
- 2017. The Rise of Realism (Polity Press, with Manuel DeLanda)
- 2018. Object-Oriented Ontology: A New Theory of Everything (Pelican Books)
- 2018. Speculative Realism: An Introduction (Polity Press)
- 2020. Art and Objects (Polity Press)
- 2020. Is There an Object-Oriented Architecture? Engaging Graham Harman (Bloomsbury)
- 2020. Skirmishes: With Friends, Enemies, and Neutrals (Punctum Books)
- 2021. Artful Objects: Graham Harman on Art and the Business of Speculative Realism (Sternberg Press)
- 2022. Architecture and Objects (University of Minnesota Press)
- 2023. The Graham Harman Reader (Zero Books, edited by Jon Cogburn & Niki Young)
- 2023. Objects Untimely: Object-Oriented Philosophy and Archaeology (Polity Press, with Christopher Witmore)
- 2025. Waves and Stones: On the Ultimate Nature of Reality (Allen Lane)

=== Edited works ===
- The Speculative Turn: Continental Materialism and Realism (2011, re.press, with co-editors Levi Bryant and Nick Srnicek)
- Editor of the "Speculative Realism" series, published by Edinburgh University Press
- Co-editor of the "New Metaphysics" series, with Bruno Latour, published by Open Humanities Press
- Editor-in-Chief of Open Philosophy, published by De Gruyter

== See also ==
- Speculative Realism
- Object-oriented ontology
- Ian Bogost
- Levi Bryant
- Timothy Morton
