= Srnicek =

Srníček or Srnicek, female Srničková, is a surname of Czech origin. Notable people with the surname include:

- Nick Srnicek (born 1982), Canadian writer and academic
- Pavel Srníček (1968–2015), Czech professional footballer
