= Duncan Weldon =

Duncan Weldon is the name of:

- Duncan Weldon (journalist) (born 1982), British journalist
- Duncan Weldon (producer) (1941–2019), British theatre producer
