= Eileen A. Joy =

Literary critic specialized in cultural studies

Eileen A. Joy (also Eileen A. Fradenburg Joy; born 1962) is an American literary critic who is a specialist in Old English literary studies and cultural studies and is the publisher and founding director of Punctum Books: spontaneous acts of scholarly combustion.

She holds a B.A. in English from Virginia Commonwealth University (1984), an M.F.A. in Fiction from Virginia Commonwealth University (1992) and a Ph.D. in Medieval Literature and Intellectual History from University of Tennessee (2001) with a dissertation Beowulf and the Floating Wreck of History. She is the founder of the BABEL Working Group and is co-editor of postmedieval: a journal of medieval cultural studies.

== Research interests ==
Joy's research interests also span poetry and poetics, intellectual history, ethics, affects, embodiment, queer studies, object/thing studies, the ecological, post-humanisms, and open access scholarly communications.

== Academic positions ==
- Associate Professor, Southern Illinois University Edwardsville (August 2009 - August 2013)
- Assistant Professor, Southern Illinois University (August 2006 - July 2009) and Director of Graduate Studies (May 2007 - August 2009)
- Visiting Assistant Professor, Coastal Carolina University (August 2005 - August 2006)
- Assistant Professor, Southern Illinois University Edwardsville (August 2003 - July 2005)
- Visiting Assistant Professor, University of North Carolina-Asheville (July 2002 - July 2003)
- Assistant Professor, Francis Marion University (August 2000 - July 2002)

== Publications ==
- Joy, E.A. 2013, Weird Reading, Speculations IV: pp. 28–34
- Levi Bryant and Eileen A. Joy, Preface: Object/Ecology, O-Zone: A Journal of Object-Oriented Studies Issue 1 :: Object/Ecology :: 2014, ISSN 2326-8344
- Eileen A. Joy, A choir or cacophony? Sample sizes and quality of conveying participants’ voices in phenomenological research, with Theodore T Bartholomew, Ellice Kang and Jill Brown, Methodological Innovations May–August 2021: pp. 1–14
- Eileen A. Joy and Christine M. Neufeld, A Confession of Faith: Notes Toward a New Humanism Journal of Narrative Theory, Volume 37, Number 2, Summer 2007, pp. 161–190, Published by Eastern Michigan University
