= Meltdown: The End of the Age of Greed =

2009 book by Paul Mason

- Cover of the first edition
- Author: Paul Mason
- Language: English
- Subject: Capitalism, Great Recession
- Published: 2009
- Publisher: Verso Books
- Publication place: United Kingdom
- Media type: Print (paperback)
- Pages: 198, 298 (2010)
- ISBN: 9781844673964

Meltdown: The End of the Age of Greed is a 2009 book by British journalist and writer Paul Mason. An updated edition was released in 2010.

== Synopsis ==
The book is an account of the Great Recession, that, according to Mason "destroyed the West's investment banks, brought the global economy to its knees, and undermined three decades of neoliberal orthodoxy". The book documents the beginnings of the crisis to its real-world consequences. The book discusses the impact of the crisis on "capitalist ideology" and politics in the "age of austerity".

== Reception ==
In The Guardian Will Hutton commended the book as a "page-turning account" of the Great Recession and wrote that "Mason is refreshingly clear-eyed about the operation of today's finance-driven capitalism—and angry". In the London Evening Standard Meltdown was described as an "excellent take on the financial crisis". However, the writer did criticise some paragraphs as being overly generous to the banking industry. In the New Statesman John Gray wrote that "people need a reliable guide to the financial crisis...Mason's Meltdown is the book they are looking for. Mason presents a richly detailed narrative of the events of the past year while setting the story firmly in the context of the flaws in the type of capitalism that was let loose over the past 20 years".
