= Kimberly Hutchings =

British academic (politics and international relations)

- Born: Kimberly Jane Hutchings; 1960 (age 65–66)

Academic background
- Education: University of Bristol (BSc); University of Sussex (MA, PhD)
- Thesis: On the Identity of the Rational and the Actual in the Philosophies of Kant and Hegel (Germany) (1988)
- Doctoral advisor: Gillian Rose

Academic work
- Institutions: Queen Mary University of London
- Doctoral students: Nick Srnicek

Kimberly Jane Hutchings (born 1960) is a British academic and professor of politics and international relations at Queen Mary University of London. Her research focuses on international political theory and ethics.

== Education and career ==
Kimberly Jane Hutchings holds a Bachelor of Science from the University of Bristol and a Master of Arts and a PhD from the University of Sussex. Her doctoral thesis, published in 1988, is titled On the Identity of the Rational and the Actual in the Philosophies of Kant and Hegel (Germany). Her PhD was supervised by Gillian Rose.

Hutchings' first academic position was at Wolverhampton University, where she taught philosophy. She then moved to Edinburgh University, teaching political and international theory and serving as the head of the department of politics (from 1999 to 2002). Between 2003 and 2014 she taught at the London School of Economics, serving as professor of international relations (from 2007 to 2014) and as head of the international relations department (from 2010 to 2013). Hutchings started teaching at Queen Mary University of London in 2014, where she was head of the school of society and environment in 2019–2020, and, as of 2026, is professor of politics and international relations.

Hutchings conducts research in the fields of international political theory and ethics. In particular, she studies the ethics and theory of feminism and war and pacifism, as well as the works of Kant and Hegel. Her work is influenced by the scholarly tradition that produced the Frankfurt School and Critical Theory.

== Awards ==
In 2015, Hutchings was awarded the inaugural distinguished contribution prize by the British International Studies Association in recognition of her sustained contributions to the field of international studies.

Hutchings received the distinguished scholar award from the Political Studies Association's theory section in 2016, and from the ethics section in 2020.

In 2023, Hutchings received the Political Studies Association's Isaiah Berlin prize for outstanding lifetime contributions to political studies for her work in political theory, feminism, and world politics.

== Selected bibliography ==
Some of Hutchings' main publications include:

- Kant, Critique and Politics (1996)
- International Political Theory: Rethinking Ethics in a Global Era (1999)
- Hegel and Feminist Philosophy (2003)
- Time and World Politics: Thinking the Present (2008)
- Global Ethics: An Introduction (2010)
- Violence and Political Theory (co-author, 2020)
- Women’s International Thought: Towards a New Canon (co-editor, 2022)
