= Object-oriented ontology =

Metaphysical school of thought

In metaphysics, object-oriented ontology (OOO) is a 21st-century Heidegger-influenced school of thought that rejects the privileging of human existence over the existence of nonhuman objects. This is in contrast to post-Kantian philosophy's tendency to refuse "speak[ing] of the world without humans or humans without the world". Object-oriented ontology maintains that objects exist independently (as Kantian noumena) of human perception and are not ontologically exhausted by their relations with humans or other objects. For object-oriented ontologists, all relations, including those between nonhumans, distort their related objects in the same basic manner as human consciousness and exist on an equal ontological footing with one another.

Object-oriented ontology is often viewed as a subset of speculative realism, a contemporary school of thought that criticizes the post-Kantian reduction of philosophical enquiry to a correlation between thought and being (correlationism), such that the reality of anything outside of this correlation is unknowable. Object-oriented ontology predates speculative realism, however, and makes distinct claims about the nature and equality of object relations to which not all speculative realists agree. The term "object-oriented philosophy" was coined by Graham Harman, the movement's founder, in his 1999 doctoral dissertation "Tool-Being: Elements in a Theory of Objects". In 2009, Levi Bryant rephrased Harman's original designation as "object-oriented ontology", giving the movement its current name.

== Founding of the movement ==
The term "object-oriented philosophy" was used by speculative philosopher Graham Harman in his 1999 doctoral dissertation "Tool-Being: Elements in a Theory of Objects" (later revised and published as Tool-Being: Heidegger and the Metaphysics of Objects). For Harman, Heideggerian Zuhandenheit, or readiness-to-hand, refers to the withdrawal of objects from human perception into a reality that cannot be manifested by practical or theoretical action. Furthering this idea, Harman contends that when objects withdraw in this way, they distance themselves from other objects, as well as humans. Resisting pragmatic interpretations of Heidegger's thought, then, Harman is able to propose an object-oriented account of metaphysical substances. Following the publication of Harman's early work, several scholars from varying fields began employing object-oriented principles in their own work. Levi Bryant began what he describes as "a very intense philosophical email exchange" with Harman, over the course of which Bryant became convinced of the credibility of object-oriented thought. Bryant subsequently used the term "object-oriented ontology" in 2009 to distinguish those ontologies committed to an account of being composed of discrete beings from Harman's object-oriented philosophy, in order to mark a difference between object-oriented philosophy (OOP) and object-oriented ontology (OOO). Harman has written "The term "object-oriented philosophy" was initially borrowed in jest from computer science, but took on a life of its own."

== Basic principles ==
While object-oriented philosophers reach different conclusions, they share common precepts, including a critique of anthropocentrism and correlationism, preservation of finitude, "withdrawal", and rejection of philosophies that undermine or "overmine" objects.

=== Rejection of anthropocentrism ===
Anthropocentrism is the privileging of humans as "subjects" over and against nonhuman beings as "objects". Philosophical anthropocentrism tends to limit certain attributes (e.g., mind, autonomy, moral agency, reason) to humans, while contrasting all other beings as variations of "object" (that is, things that obey deterministic laws, impulses, stimuli, instincts, and so on). Beginning with Kant's epistemology, modern philosophers began articulating a transcendental anthropocentrism, whereby the Kantian argument that objects are unknowable outside of the imposed, categories of the human mind, in turn, shores up discourses wherein objects frequently become effectively reduced to mere products of human cognition. In contrast to Kant's view, object-oriented philosophers maintain that objects exist independently of human perception, and that nonhuman object relations distort their related objects in the same fundamental manner as human consciousness. Thus, all object relations, human and nonhuman, are said to exist on an equal ontological footing with one another.

=== Critique of correlationism ===
Related to 'anthropocentrism', object-oriented thinkers reject speculative idealist correlationism, which the French philosopher Quentin Meillassoux defines as "the idea according to which we only ever have access to the correlation between thinking and being, and never to either term considered apart from the other". Because object-oriented ontology is a realist philosophy, it stands in contradistinction to the anti-realist trajectory of correlationism, which restricts philosophical understanding to the correlation of being with thought by disavowing any reality external to this correlation as inaccessible, and, in this way, fails to escape the ontological reification of human experience. Many take this to mean that object-oriented ontologists see inert or inanimate objects as being equal to humans. Object-oriented ontologists, on the other hand, reject this understanding, arguing that the claim of objects existing in the same way humans do is not synonymous with the claim that all things are equal in terms of moral, ethical, or aesthetic value.

=== Rejection of undermining, "overmining", and "duomining" ===
Object-oriented ontology rejects both upward reduction ("overmining") and downward reduction ("undermining") of objects.

Object-oriented thought holds that there are two principal strategies for devaluing the philosophical import of objects. First, one can undermine objects by claiming that they are an effect or manifestation of a deeper, underlying substance or force. Second, one can "overmine" objects by either an idealism which holds that there is nothing beneath what appears in the mind or, as in social constructionism, by positing no independent reality outside of language, discourse or power. Object-oriented philosophy fundamentally rejects both undermining and "overmining", since both approaches hand-wave objects away by attributing their existence to other, more fundamental elements of reality.

In a 2013 paper, Graham Harman also discussed the concept of duomining. Borrowing the word from computing science, Harman uses "duomining" to refer to philosophical or ontological approaches that both undermine and overmine objects at the same time. Harman asserts that Quentin Meillassoux's ontology is based on "a classic duomining position", since "he holds that the primary qualities of things are those which can be mathematized and denies that he is a Pythagorean, insisting that numbers do not exhaust the world but simply point to a sort of 'dead matter' whose exact metaphysical status is never clarified".

=== Withdrawal ===
Object-oriented ontology holds that objects are independent not only of other objects but also from the qualities they animate at any specific spatiotemporal location. Accordingly, objects cannot be exhausted by their relations with humans or other objects in theory or practice, meaning that the reality of objects is always ready-to-hand. The retention by an object of reality in excess of any relation is known as withdrawal. And since all objects are, in their fullness, partially withdrawn from one another, every relation is said to be an act of translation, meaning that no object can perfectly translate another object into its own nomenclature; Harman has referred to this as the "problem with paraphrase".

== Metaphysics of Graham Harman ==
In Tool-Being: Heidegger and the Metaphysics of Objects, Graham Harman interprets the tool-analysis contained in Martin Heidegger's Being and Time as inaugurating an ontology of objects themselves, rather than the valorization of practical action or networks of signification. According to Harman, Heideggerian Zuhandenheit, or readiness-to-hand, indicates the withdrawal of objects from both practical and theoretical action, such that objectal reality cannot be exhausted by either practical usage or theoretical investigation. Harman further contends that objects withdraw not just from human interaction, but also from other objects. He maintains:

If the human perception of a house or a tree is forever haunted by some hidden surplus in the things that never become present, the same is true of the sheer causal interaction between rocks or raindrops. Even inanimate things only unlock each other's realities to a minimal extent, reducing one another to caricatures...even if rocks are not sentient creatures, they never encounter one another in their deepest being, but only as present-at-hand; it is only Heidegger's confusion of two distinct senses of the as-structure that prevents this strange result from being accepted.

From this, Harman concludes that the primary site of ontological investigation is objects and relations, instead of the post-Kantian emphasis on the human-world correlate. Moreover, this holds true for all entities, be they human, nonhuman, natural, or artificial, leading to the downplaying of Dasein as an ontological priority. In its place, Harman proposes a concept of objects that are irreducible to both material particles and human perception, and "exceed every relation into which they might enter".

Coupling Heidegger's tool analysis with the phenomenological insights of Edmund Husserl, Harman introduces two types of objects: real objects and sensual objects. Real objects are objects that withdraw from all experience, whereas sensual objects are those that exist only in experience. Additionally, Harman suggests two kinds of qualities: sensual qualities, or those found in experience, and real qualities, which are accessed through intellectual probing. Pairing sensual and real objects and qualities yields the following four "tensions":

- Real Object/Real Qualities (RO-RQ): This pairing grounds the capacity of real objects to differ from one another, without collapsing into indefinite substrata. This tension thus refers to "a real or indescribable object" encrusted with "real properties" that cannot be experientially understood. Harman refers to this as "essence".
- Real Object/Sensual Qualities (RO-SQ): As in the tool-analysis, a withdrawn object is translated into sensual apprehension via a "surface" accessed by thought and/or action. This tension thus refers to "the multiple facets [an object] displays to the outer world, and whatever [real, withdrawn] organizing principle is able to hold together [those] features." Harman identifies this as "space".
- Sensual Object/Real Qualities (SO-RQ): The structure of conscious phenomena are forged from eidetic, or experientially interpretive, qualities intuited intellectually. This tension thus refers to "a perfectly accessible [object] whose features are withdrawn from [total] scrutiny", Harman dubs "eidos"
- Sensual Object/Sensual Qualities (SO-SQ): Sensual objects are present, but enmeshed within a "mist of accidental features and profiles". This tension thus refers to "an enduring sensual object and its shifting parade of qualities from one moment to the next", which Harman identifies as "time".

To explain how withdrawn objects make contact with and relate to one another, Harman submits the theory of vicarious causation, whereby two hypothetical entities meet in the interior of a third entity, existing side-by-side until something occurs to prompt interaction. Harman compares this idea to the classical notion of formal causation, in which forms do not directly touch, but influence one another in a common space "from which all are partly absent". Causation, says Harman, is always vicarious, asymmetrical, and buffered:

'Vicarious' means that objects confront one another only by proxy, through sensual profiles found only on the interior of some other entity. 'Asymmetrical' means that the initial confrontation always unfolds between a real object and a sensual one. And 'buffered' means that [real objects] do not fuse into [sensual objects], nor [sensual objects] into their sensual neighbors, since all are held at bay through unknown firewalls sustaining the privacy of each. from the asymmetrical and buffered inner life of an object, vicarious connections arise occasionally...giving birth to new objects with their own interior spaces.

Thus, causation entails the connection between a real object residing within the directionality of consciousness, or a unified "intention," with another real object residing outside of the intention, where the intention itself is also classified as a real object. From here, Harman extrapolates five types of relations between objects. Containment describes a relation in which the intention "contains" both the real object and the sensual object. Contiguity connotes relations between sensual objects lying side-by-side within an intention, not affecting one another, such that a sensual object's bystanders can be rearranged without disrupting the object's identity. Sincerity characterizes the absorption of a real object by a sensual object, in a manner that "takes seriously" the sensual object without containing or being contiguous to it. Connection conveys the vicarious generation of intention by real objects indirectly encountering one another. Finally, no relation represents the typical condition of reality, since real objects are incapable of direct interaction and are limited in their causal influence upon and relation to other objects.

== Expansion ==
Since its inception by Graham Harman in 1999, many authors in a variety of disciplines have adapted and expanded upon Harman's ideas.

=== Onticology (Bryant) ===
Like Harman, Levi Bryant opposes post-Kantian anthropocentrism and philosophies of access. From Bryant's perspective, the Kantian contention that reality is accessible to human knowledge because it is structured by human cognition limits philosophy to a self-reflexive analysis of the mechanisms and institutions through which cognition structures reality. He states:

For, in effect, the Copernican Revolution will reduce philosophical investigation to the interrogation of a single relation: the human-world gap. And indeed, in the reduction of philosophy to the interrogation of this single relation or gap, not only will there be excessive focus on how humans relate to the world to the detriment of anything else, but this interrogation will be profoundly asymmetrical. For the world or the object related to through the agency of the human will becomes a mere prop or vehicle for human cognition, language, and intentions without contributing anything of its own.

To counter the form of post-Kantian epistemology, Bryant articulates an object-oriented philosophy called onticology, grounded in three principles. First, the Ontic Principle states that "there is no difference that does not make a difference". Following from the premises that questions of difference precede epistemological interrogation and that to be is to create differences, this principle posits that knowledge cannot be fixed prior to engagement with difference. And so, for Bryant, the thesis that there is a thing-in-itself that we cannot know is untenable because it presupposes forms of being that make no differences. Similarly, concepts of difference predicated upon negation—that which objects are not or lack when placed in comparison with one another—are dismissed as arising only from the perspective of consciousness, rather than an ontological difference that affirms independent being. Second, the Principle of the Inhuman asserts that the concept of difference producing difference is not restricted to human, sociocultural, or epistemological domains, thereby marking the being of difference as independent of knowledge and consciousness. Humans exist as difference-making beings among other difference-making beings, therefore, without holding any special position with respect to other differences. Third, the Ontological Principle maintains that if there is no difference that does not also make a difference, then the making of difference is the minimal condition for the existence of being. In Bryant's words, "if a difference is made, then the being is". Bryant further contends that differences produced by an object can be inter-ontic (made with respect to another object) or intra-ontic (pertaining to the internal constitution of the object).

Onticology distinguishes between four different types of objects: bright objects, dim objects, dark objects, and rogue objects. Bright objects are objects that strongly manifest themselves and heavily impact other objects, such as the ubiquity of cell phones in high-tech cultures. Dim objects lightly manifest themselves in an assemblage of objects; for example, a neutrino passing through solid matter without producing observable effects. Dark objects are objects that are so completely withdrawn that they produce no local manifestations and do not affect any other objects. Rogue objects are not chained to any given assemblage of objects, but instead wander in and out of assemblages, modifying relations within the assemblages into which they enter. Political protestors exemplify rogue objects by breaking with the norms and relations of a dominant political assemblage in order to forge new relations that challenge, change, or cast off the prior assemblage. Additionally, Bryant has proposed the concept of 'wilderness ontology' to explain the philosophical pluralization of agency away from human privilege.

=== Hyperobjects (Morton) ===
Timothy Morton became involved with object-oriented ontology after their ecological writings were favorably compared with the movement's ideas. In The Ecological Thought (2010), Morton introduced the concept of hyperobjects to describe objects that are so massively distributed in time and space as to transcend spatio-temporal specificities, such as global warming, styrofoam, and radioactive plutonium. In their follow-up book, Hyperobjects: Philosophy and Ecology after the End of the World (2013), Morton argued that the titular entities are defined by five key traits:

1. Viscous: Hyperobjects adhere to any other object they touch, no matter how hard an object tries to resist. In this way, hyperobjects overrule ironic distance, meaning that the more an object tries to resist a hyperobject, the more glued to the hyperobject it becomes.
2. Molten: Hyperobjects are so massive that they refute the idea that spacetime is fixed, concrete, and consistent.
3. Nonlocal: Hyperobjects are massively distributed in time and space to the extent that their totality cannot be realized in any particular local manifestation. For example, global warming is a hyperobject that impacts meteorological conditions, such as tornado formation. According to Morton, though, objects do not feel global warming, but instead experience tornadoes as they cause damage in specific places. Thus, nonlocality describes the manner in which a hyperobject becomes more substantial than the local manifestations they produce.
4. Phased: Hyperobjects occupy a higher dimensional space than other entities can normally perceive. This means that hyperobjects appear to come and go in three-dimensional space, but would appear differently to an observer with a higher multidimensional view.
5. Interobjective: Hyperobjects are formed by relations between more than one object. Consequently, objects are only able to perceive the imprint, or "footprint," of a hyperobject upon other objects, revealed as information. For example, global warming is formed by interactions between the Sun, fossil fuels, and carbon dioxide, among other objects. Yet, global warming is made apparent through emissions levels, temperature changes, and ocean levels, making it seem as if global warming is a product of scientific models, rather than an object that predated its own measurement.

According to Morton, hyperobjects not only become visible during an age of ecological crisis but alert humans to the ecological dilemmas defining the age in which they live. Additionally, the existential capacity of hyperobjects to outlast a turn toward less materialistic cultural values, coupled with the threat many such objects pose toward organic matter, gives them a potential spiritual quality, in which their treatment by future societies may become indistinguishable from reverential care.

=== Alien phenomenology (Bogost) ===
Ian Bogost, a video game researcher at the Georgia Institute of Technology and founding partner of Persuasive Games, has articulated an "applied" object-oriented ontology, concerned more with the being of specific objects than the exploration of foundational principles. Bogost calls his approach alien phenomenology, with the term "alien" designating the manner in which withdrawal accounts for the inviolability of objectal experience. From this perspective, an object may not recognize the experience of other objects because objects relate to one another using metaphors of selfhood.

Alien phenomenology is grounded in three "modes" of practice. First, ontography entails the production of works that reveal the existence and relation of objects. Second, metaphorism denotes the production of works that speculate about the "inner lives" of objects, including how objects translate the experience of other objects into their own terms. Third, carpentry indicates the creation of artifacts that illustrate the perspective of objects, or how objects construct their own worlds. Bogost sometimes refers to his version of object-oriented thought as a tiny ontology to emphasize his rejection of rigid ontological categorization of forms of being, including distinctions between "real" and "fictional" objects. Bogost's object-oriented phenomenology has helped shape the budding field of "platform studies", which seeks to "investigate the relationships between the hardware and software design of computing systems and the creative works produced on those systems".

== Criticism ==
Some commentators contend that object-oriented ontology degrades meaning by placing humans and objects on equal footing. Matthew David Segall has argued that object-oriented philosophers should explore the theological and anthropological implications of their ideas in order to avoid "slipping into the nihilism of some speculative realists, where human values are a fluke in an uncaring and fundamentally entropic universe".

Other critical commentators such as David Berry and Alexander Galloway have commented on the historical situatedness of an ontology that mirrors computational processes and even the metaphors and language of computation. Pancomputationalism and digital physics explore these ideas further.

Joshua Simon contextualized the rise of popularity of the theory in contemporary art circles as a variation on commodity fetishism - a return to the primacy of the object, in a post-2008 art market.

Scott Sundvall noted the rhetorical implications of object-oriented ontology and thought (object-oriented rhetoric), clarifying the false ontological and metaphysical determinacy of such an inherently impossible abstraction, as well as detailing the ethical bankruptcy and "dark politics" of such an ontological and metaphysical position.

Rein Raud has argued that object-oriented ontology fails to attain one of its proclaimed goals, namely the rejection of anthropocentrism because the "objects" it discusses are always just those that the human cognitive apparatus readily perceives or the human mind conceptualizes.

Cultural critic Steven Shaviro has criticized object-oriented ontology as too dismissive of process philosophy. According to Shaviro, the process philosophies of Alfred North Whitehead, Gilbert Simondon, and Gilles Deleuze account for how objects come into existence and endure over time, in contrast to the view that objects "are already there" taken by object-oriented approaches. Shaviro also finds fault with Harman's assertion that Whitehead, Simondon, and Iain Hamilton Grant undermine objects by positing objects as manifestations of a deeper, underlying substance, saying that the antecedence of these thinkers, particularly Grant and Simondon, includes the "plurality of actually existing objects", rather than a single substance of which objects are mere epiphenomena.

Philosopher Peter Wolfendale has a book-length criticism of object-oriented ontology, arguing it is unable to deliver on its promise of non-correlationist philosophy. "Instead, Wolfendale claims, Harman is merely an eccentric correlationist, who promises the world but gives us only a panoply of gestures, a masquerade of allusions in which the possibility of making any true statement about the world is permanently withheld."
