= Why It's Kicking Off Everywhere =

2011 book by Paul Mason

Why It's Kicking Off Everywhere: The New Global Revolutions
- Cover of the first edition
- Author: Paul Mason
- Language: English
- Subjects: Arab Spring, Anti-austerity protests in Europe, Occupy movement, Great Recession
- Published: 2011
- Publisher: Verso Books
- Publication place: United Kingdom
- Media type: Print (paperback)
- Pages: 244
- ISBN: 978-1844678518

Why It's Kicking Off Everywhere: The New Global Revolutions is a 2011 book by British journalist and writer Paul Mason. An updated edition, titled Why It's Still Kicking Off Everywhere: The New Global Revolutions, was released in 2013.

== Synopsis ==
Mason analyses the wave of popular protest, revolution and revolt from the Arab Spring, the Occupy movement to the 2011 England riots. Mason travels globally from Athens to Cairo to put the events into context and argues that the events "reflect the expanding power of the individual and calls for new political alternatives to elite rule and global poverty".

== Reception ==
In the New Statesman George Eaton, who described Mason as "possibly the most engaged mainstream journalist of our age", noted that "thanks to his compulsively vivid style, however, even sceptics will find this a page-turner". In Peace News the book is strongly praised as "a treasure trove for activists" and an "important, consistently thrilling book" while Mason is complimented as being "closer to the politics of the street than any other mainstream journalist currently working". However, the reviewer argues that "Mason gets a bit too wrapped up in the excitement at times. Certainly, his gushing descriptions of the young people at the centre of events are perhaps a little wide-eyed".

In The Observer Ian Birrell characterises the book as "passionately written" but claims that Mason tries to suit the events to his anti-capitalist views, noting that "the evils of capitalism and neoliberalism are presented as one of they [sic] key causes of the Arab spring".

A lecture was held at the London School of Economics and Political Science in 2012 by Mason regarding the book.
