= Nick Srnicek =

Canadian writer and academic (born 1982)

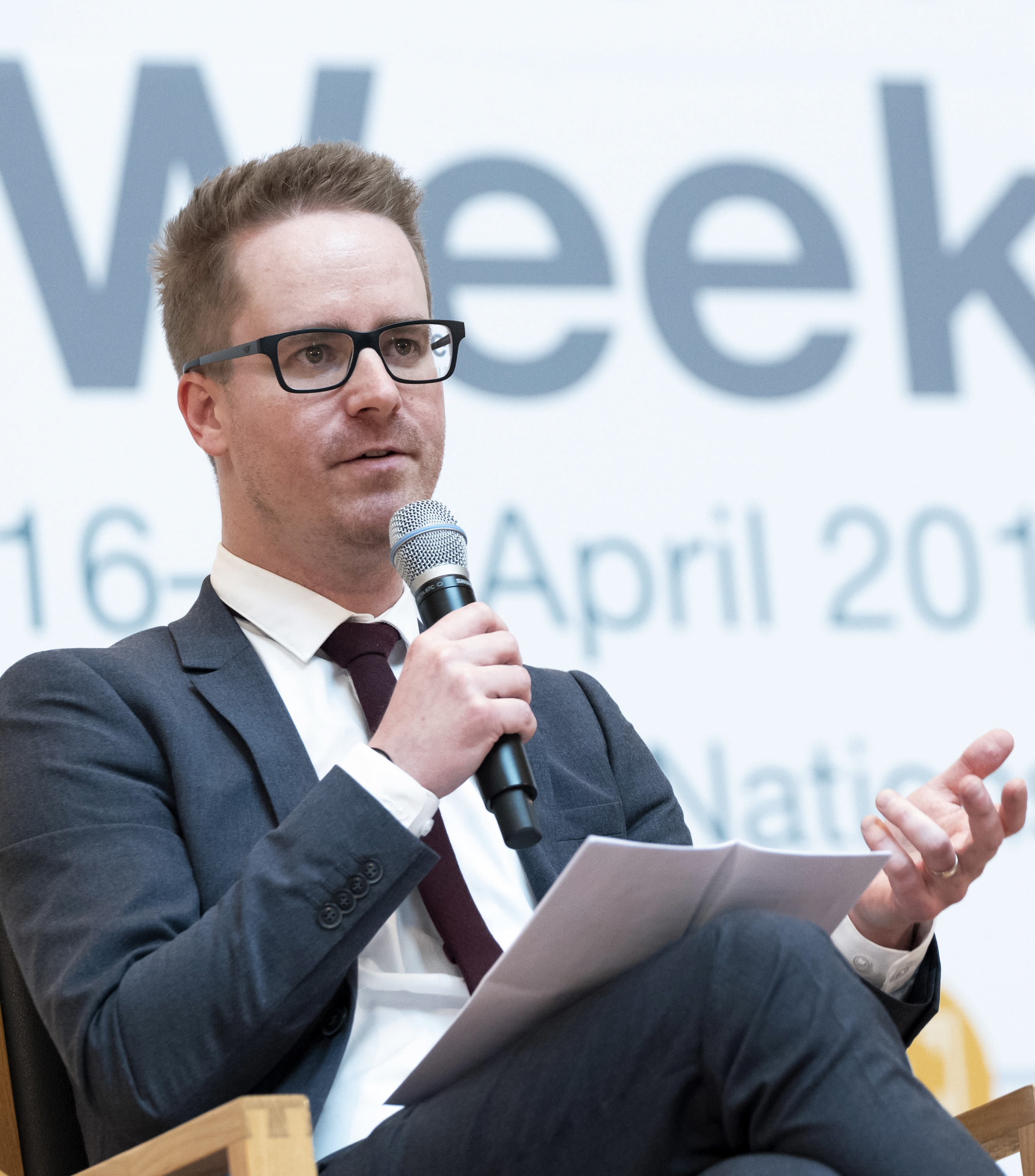
- Srnicek in 2018
- Born: 1982 (age 43–44)

Education
- Education: London School of Economics
- Thesis: Representing complexity: the material construction of world politics (2013)
- Doctoral advisor: Kimberly Hutchings

Philosophical work
- Era: Contemporary philosophy
- Region: Western philosophy
- School: Continental philosophy Speculative realism Accelerationism
- Institutions: King's College London
- Main interests: Political philosophy

Nick Srnicek (born 1982) is a Canadian writer and academic. He is currently a lecturer in Digital Economy in the Department of Digital Humanities, King's College London. Srnicek is associated with the political theory of accelerationism and a post-scarcity economy.

== Biography ==
Srnicek took a double major in psychology and philosophy, before completing an MA at the University of Western Ontario in 2007. He proceeded to a PhD in international relations at the London School of Economics, completing his thesis in 2013 on "Representing complexity: the material construction of world politics" under the supervision of Kimberly Hutchings. He has worked as a visiting lecturer at City University and the University of Westminster.

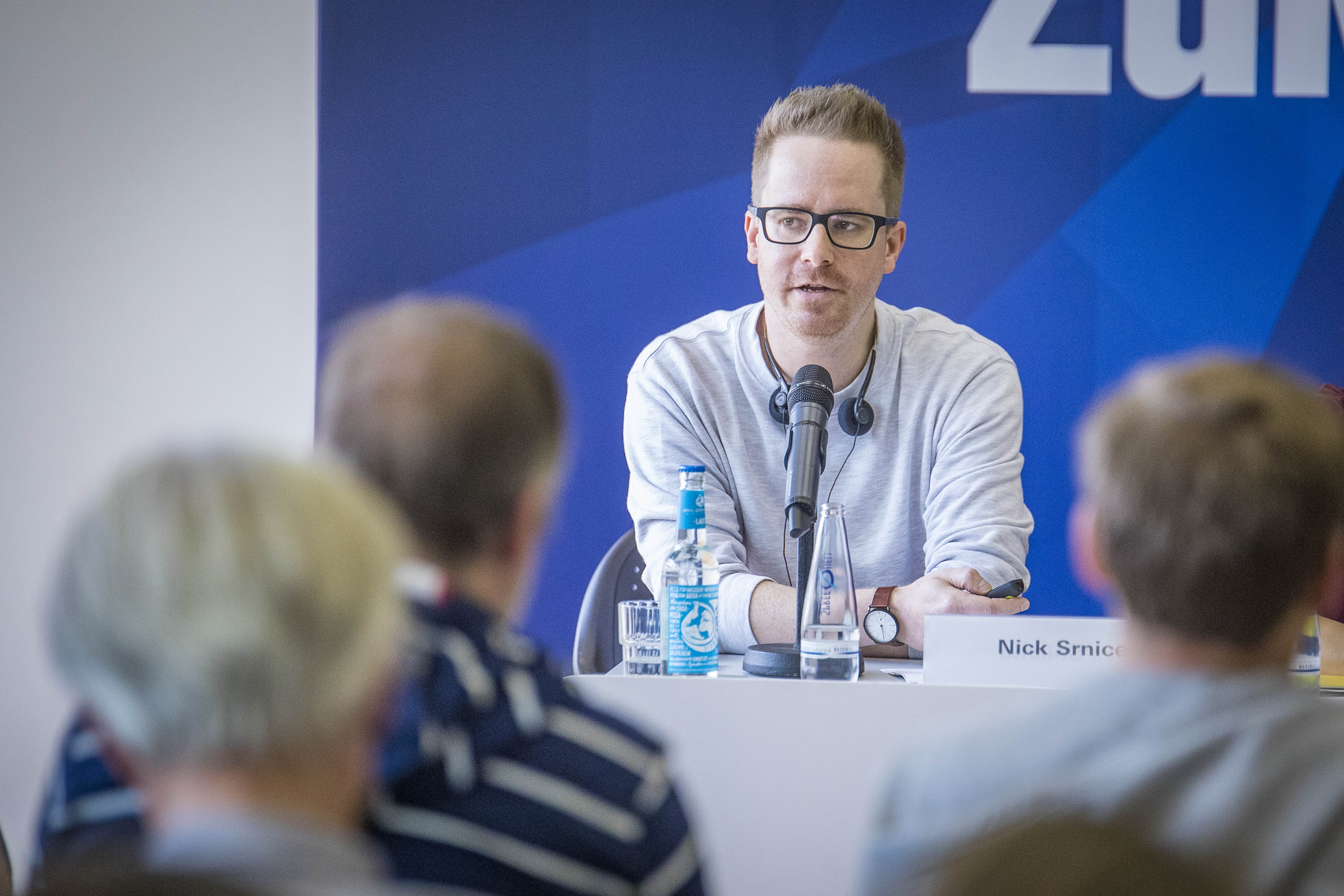
Srnicek at the closing panel of the Left Week of the Future: How We Win the Future

== Bibliography ==
- Bryant, Levi R.; Srnicek, Nick; Harman, Graham (2011). The Speculative Turn: Continental Materialism and Realism. Anamnesis. Melbourne: Re.press. ISBN 978-0-9806683-4-6.
- Johnson, Joshua, ed. (2013). "#Accelerate: Manifesto for an Accelerationist Politics". Dark Trajectories. Name Publications. pp. 135–55. ISBN 978-0-9840566-9-9. OCLC 892575302.
- Mackay, Robin, ed. (20 October 2014). Speculative Aesthetics. Urbanomic. ISBN 9780993045851.
- Mackay, Robin, ed. (December 2014). "On Cunning Automata: Financial Acceleration at the Limits of the Dromological". Collapse VIII: Casino Real. Collapse. Urbanomic. pp. 9–52. ISBN 978-0-9567750-2-3.
- Srnicek, Nick; Alex Williams (2015). Inventing the Future: Postcapitalism and a World Without Work. London: Verso. ISBN 978-1-7847-8096-8.
- Salemy, Mohammad, ed. (2016). For Machine Use Only: Contemplations on Algorithmic Epistemology. Gwangju: The New Centre for Research & Practice. ISBN 978-0-692-77176-1.
- Graham, Mark; Shaw, Joe, eds. (2017). Towards A Fairer Gig Economy. Meatspace Press. ISBN 9780995577664.
- Srnicek, Nick (2017). Platform Capitalism. Polity. ISBN 978-1-5095-0486-2.
- Lijster, Thijs, ed. (2018). The Future of the New: Artistic Innovation in Times of Social Acceleration. Antennae - Arts in society. Amsterdam: Valiz. ISBN 978-94-92095-58-9.
- Hester, Helen; Srnicek, Nick (2023). After Work: A History of the Home and the Fight for Free Time. Theory Redux. Verso. ISBN 978-1-78663-307-1.
- Srnicek, Nick (2025). Silicon Empires: The Fight for the Future of AI. Polity Press. ISBN 978-1-5095-5048-7.

Critical studies and reviews of Srnicek's work

- Heller, Nathan (21 August 2017). "Out of action : do protests work?". The Critics. A Critic at Large. The New Yorker. Vol. 93, no. 24. pp. 70–77. Reviews Inventing the future.
- Lowrie, Ian (17 November 2015). "On Algorithmic Communism". Los Angeles Review Of Books. Reviews Inventing the future.
