= Levi Bryant =

American philosopher

Philosophical work
- Era: Contemporary philosophy
- Region: Western philosophy
- School: Continental philosophy Speculative realism (onticology)
- Institutions: Board member of The New Centre for Research & Practice
- Main interests: Metaphysics
- Notable ideas: Object-oriented ontology, onticology, regime of attraction, local manifestation, virtual proper being, wilderness ontology

Levi Bryant, born Paul Reginald Bryant, is a professor of philosophy at Collin College in the Dallas–Fort Worth metropolitan area.

Bryant has written extensively about post-structural and cultural theory, including the work of Gilles Deleuze, Jacques Lacan, Jacques Rancière, and Slavoj Žižek. His blog, Larval Subjects, was founded in 2006 and had over 2 million hits as of September 2011.

In addition to working as a professor, Bryant also practices as a Lacanian psychoanalyst.

== Life ==
Bryant became interested in philosophy as a teenager, after struggling through personal turmoil. He received his Ph.D. from Loyola University in Chicago, Illinois, where he originally intended to study 'disclosedness' with the Heidegger scholar Thomas Sheehan. Bryant later changed his dissertation topic to the transcendental empiricism of Gilles Deleuze, with his analysis becoming the basis of his first book, Difference and Givenness: Deleuze's Transcendental Empiricism and the Ontology of Immanence, published in 2008.

== Philosophical work ==
He was a member of the object-oriented philosophy movement and coined the term object-oriented ontology in 2009 to distinguish positions that are committed to the thesis that beings are composed of things from Graham Harman's object-oriented philosophy. His own version of object-oriented thought, called 'onticology', disprivileges human experience from a central position in metaphysical inquiry, while holding that objects are always split between two domains, virtuality and actuality. For Bryant, virtuality refers to the powers and potential of any given object, whereas actuality designates the qualities manifested by the actualization of an object's potential at any given point in time. Later Bryant, concerned with the doctrine of withdrawal and the non-relationism of object-oriented philosophy, departed from the object-oriented ontology movement and developed a machine-oriented ontology that argues being is composed entirely of machines or processes.

=== Onticology ===
Like other object-oriented ontologists, Bryant opposes the anthropocentrism of the Copernican Revolution proposed by Immanuel Kant, wherein objects are said to conform to the mind of the subject and, in turn, become products of human cognition. From Bryant's perspective, the Kantian contention that reality is inaccessible to human knowledge because it is structured by human cognition limits philosophy to a self-reflexive analysis of the mechanisms and institutions through which cognition structures reality. He states:

For, in effect, the Copernican Revolution will reduce philosophical investigation to the interrogation of a single relation: the human-world gap. And indeed, in the reduction of philosophy to the interrogation of this single relation or gap, not only will there be excessive focus on how humans relate to the world to the detriment of anything else, but this interrogation will be profoundly asymmetrical. For the world or the object related to through the agency of the human will becomes a mere prop or vehicle for human cognition, language, and intentions without contributing anything of its own.

To counter the form of post-Kantian epistemology, Bryant articulates an object-oriented philosophy called 'onticology', grounded in three principles. First, the Ontic Principle states that "there is no difference that does not make a difference." Following from the premises that questions of difference precede epistemological interrogation and that to be is to produce differences, this principle posits that knowledge cannot be fixed prior to engagement with difference. Consequently, for Bryant, the thesis that things-in-themselves exist outside the boundaries of knowledge is untenable because it presupposes forms of being that make no differences. Similarly, concepts of difference predicated upon negation—that which objects are not or lack when placed in comparison with one another—are dismissed as arising only from the perspective of consciousness, rather than an ontological difference that affirms independent being. Second, the Principle of the Inhuman asserts that the concept of difference producing difference is not restricted to human, sociocultural, or epistemological domains, thereby marking the being of difference as independent of knowledge and consciousness. Humans exist as difference-making beings among other difference-making beings, therefore, without holding any special position with respect to other differences. Third, the Ontological Principle maintains that if there is no difference that does not also make a difference, then the making of difference is the minimal condition for the existence of being. In Bryant's words, "if a difference is made, then the being is." Bryant further contends that differences produced by an object can be inter-ontic (made with respect to another object) or intra-ontic (pertaining the internal constitution of the object).

Since onticology construes anything that produces differences—including fictions, signs, animals, and plants—as being equally real, albeit at different scales, it is what Manuel Delanda has called a "flat ontology." Within an onticological framework, objects are composed of differences coalescing into a system that reproduces itself through time. Changes in the identity of an object are not changes in substance (defined by Bryant as "a particular state attained by difference"), however, but shifts in the qualities belonging to a substance. Qualities are the actualization of an object's inhered capacities or abilities, known as an object's powers. The actualization of an object's power into qualities or properties at a specific place and time is called local manifestation. Importantly, the occurrence of local manifestations does not require observation. In this way, qualities comprise actuality, referring to the actualization of an object's potential at a particular spatiotemporal location among a multitude of material differences, whereas powers constitute virtuality, or the potential retained by an object across time. As objects are distinct from local manifestations and one another, referred to as withdrawal, their being is defined by the relations forming their internal structure, or endo-relations, and retained powers. This withdrawn being is known as the virtual proper being of an object and denotes its enduring, unified substantiality. When relations external to an object, or exo-relations, consistently induce the same local manifestations to the extent that the actualization of qualities tends toward stability (for example, the sky remaining blue because of the constancy of Rayleigh scattering on atmospheric particles), the set of relations forms a regime of attraction.

Onticology distinguishes between four different types of objects: bright objects, dim objects, dark objects, and rogue objects. Bright objects are objects that strongly manifest themselves and heavily impact other objects, such as the ubiquity of cell phones in high-tech cultures. Dim objects lightly manifest themselves in an assemblage of objects; for example, a neutrino passing through solid matter without producing observable effects. Dark objects are objects that are so completely withdrawn that they produce no local manifestations and do not affect any other objects. Rogue objects are not chained to any given assemblage of objects, but instead wander in and out of assemblages, modifying relations within the assemblages into which they enter. Political protestors exemplify rogue objects by breaking with the norms and relations of a dominant political assemblage in order to forge new relations that challenge, change, or cast off the prior assemblage.

Additionally, Bryant has proposed the concept of 'wilderness ontology' to explain the philosophical pluralization of agency away from human privilege. For Bryant, wilderness ontology alludes to the being of being, or common essence "characteristic of all entities and their relations to one another." Resisting the traditional notion of wilderness that views civilization (the "inside" world of social relations, language, and norms) as separate from wilderness (the "outside" world of plants, animals, and nature), wilderness ontology argues that "wilderness" contains all forms of being, including civilization. Accordingly, the practice of wilderness ontology involves experiencing oneself as a being amongst, rather than above, other beings. In generalizing the agential alterity of being as a foundational ontological principle, Bryant posits three theses: First, wilderness ontology signals the absence of ontological hierarchy, such that all forms of being exist on equal footing with one another. Second, wilderness ontology rejects the topological bifurcation of nature and culture into discrete domains, instead holding that cultural assemblages are only one possible set of relations into which nonhuman entities may enter in the wilderness. Third, wilderness ontology extends agency to all entities, human and nonhuman, rather than casting nonhuman entities as passive recipients of human meaning projection. Employing these theses, Bryant pluralizes agential being beyond human finitude, contending that in so doing, the intentionality of the nonhuman world may be investigated without reference to human intent.

== Bibliography ==
- 2008. Difference and Givenness: Deleuze's Transcendental Empiricism and the Ontology of Immanence (Northwestern University Press).
- 2011. The Speculative Turn: Continental Materialism and Realism [co-editor, with Nick Srnicek and Graham Harman] (re.press).
- 2011. The Democracy of Objects (Open Humanities Press).
- 2014. Onto-Cartography: An Ontology of Machines and Media (University of Edinburgh Press).

== See also ==
- New materialism
