= Timothy Morton =

British philosopher

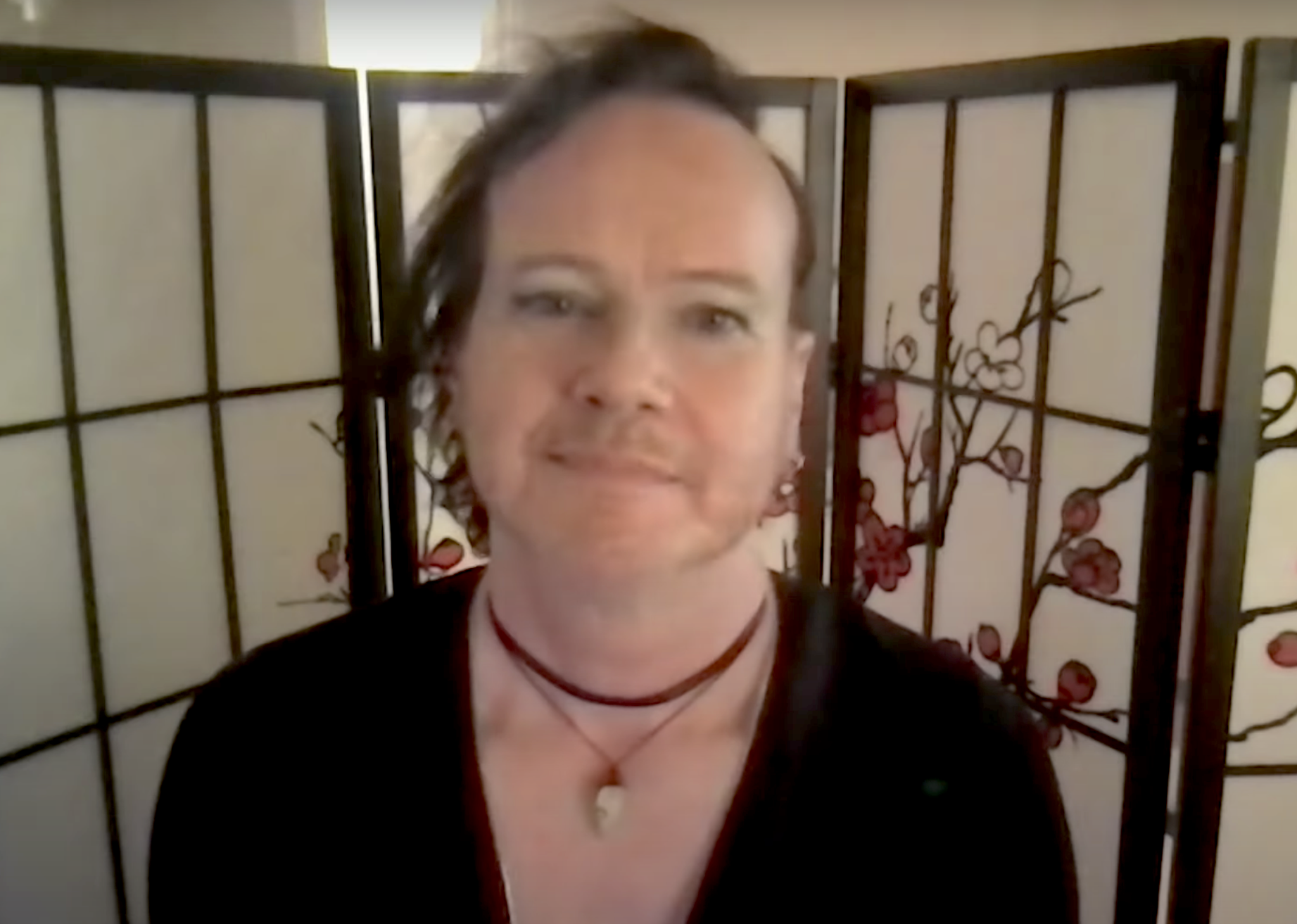
- Born: Timothy Bloxam Morton; 19 June 1968 (age 58); London, England

Education
- Education: Magdalen College, Oxford

Philosophical work
- Era: Contemporary philosophy
- Region: Western philosophy
- School: Speculative realism
- Main interests: Metaphysics, realism, ecocriticism, object-oriented ontology, Buddhism
- Notable ideas: Hyperobjects, realist magic, mesh, strange strangers, symbiotic real

Timothy Bloxam Morton (born 19 June 1968) is a professor and Rita Shea Guffey Chair in English at Rice University. A member of the object-oriented philosophy movement, Morton explores the intersection of object-oriented thought and ecological studies. Morton's use of the term 'hyperobjects' was inspired by Björk's 1996 single 'Hyperballad', although the term 'Hyper-objects' (denoting n-dimensional non-local entities) has also been used in computer science since 1967. Morton uses the term to explain objects so massively distributed in time and space as to transcend localization, such as climate change and styrofoam.

Morton's book Humankind: Solidarity with Non-Human People explores the separation between humans and non-humans and from an object-oriented ontological perspective, arguing that humans need to radically rethink the way in which they conceive of, and relate to, non-human animals and nature as a whole, going on to explore the political implications of such a change. Morton has also written extensively about the literature of Percy Bysshe Shelley and Mary Shelley, Romanticism, diet studies, and ecotheory. Morton is a faculty member in the Synthetic Landscapes postgraduate program at the Southern California Institute of Architecture (SCI-Arc).

== Personal life and education ==
Morton received a B.A. and D.Phil. in English from Magdalen College, Oxford. Their doctoral dissertation, Re-Imagining the Body: Shelley and the Languages of Diet, studied the representation of diet, temperance, and consumption in the works of Percy Bysshe Shelley. According to Morton, the decision to study English literature, as opposed to more academically fashionable classics, stemmed from a desire to engage with modes of thought evolving internationally "including all kinds of continental philosophy that just wasn't happening much in England at the time, what with the war against 'theory' and all."

Before obtaining a professorship at Rice University in 2012, Morton taught at the University of California, Davis, New York University and the University of Colorado, Boulder.

== Theoretical works ==
Morton's theoretical writings espouse an eclectic approach to scholarship. Their subjects include the poetry and literature of Percy Bysshe Shelley and Mary Shelley, the cultural significance and context of food, ecology and environmentalism, and object-oriented ontology (OOO).

=== Shelley scholarship ===
In 1995, Morton published Shelley and the Revolution in Taste: The Body and the Natural World, an extension of the ideas presented in their doctoral dissertation. Investigating how food came to signify ideological outlook in the late eighteenth and early nineteenth centuries, Morton's book is an attempt at 'green' cultural criticism, whereby bodies and the social or environmental conditions in which they appear are shown to be interrelated. Employing a 'prescriptive' analysis of various Romantic texts, especially Percy Bysshe Shelley's A Vindication of Natural Diet (1813), Morton argues that the figurative rhetorical elements of these texts should be read not simply as clever language play, but as commands to establish consumptive practices that challenge ideological configurations of how the body relates to normativity.

For Morton, authoritarian power dynamics, commodity flows, industrial logic, and the distinction between the domains of nature and culture are inhered in the 'discourses of diet' articulated by the Shelleys. Shelleyan prose regarding forms of consumption, particularly vegetarianism, is read as a call for social reform and figurative discussions of intemperance and intoxication as warnings against tyranny.

Morton has edited two critical volumes on the Shelleyan corpus. In 2002, they published a compilation of critical and historical reflections on Mary Shelley's Frankenstein entitled Mary Shelley's Frankenstein: A Routledge Study Guide and Sourcebook. Then, in 2006, Morton edited The Cambridge Companion to Shelley, an interdisciplinary overview of Percy Bysshe Shelley's themes, language, narrative structure, literary philosophy, and political views.

=== Diet studies ===
From 2000 to 2004, Morton published three works dealing with the intersection of food and cultural studies. In the first of these to be published, The Poetics of Spice: Romantic Consumerism and the Exotic (2000), Morton unpacked the evolution of European consumer culture through an analysis of the figurative use of spice in Romantic literature. Viewing spice as a cultural artifact that functioned "as discourse, not object, naively transparent to itself" during the Romantic period, they elucidate two general characteristics of the poetics of spice: materiality and transumption.

The 'materiality' of spice connects its symbolic and social roles with its capacity for desire production. Morton cites the "trade winds topos" (perfumed breeze believed to waft from exotic lands in which spices are domestic) in Milton's Paradise Lost as an example, concluding that Milton prefigures the symbolic use of spice in later works by presenting Satan's journey from Hell to Chaos as a parallel to the travels of spice traders. In contrast, 'transumption', following Harold Bloom's deployment of the rhetorical concept, entails the use of a metasignifier that "serves as a figure for poetic language itself."

According to Morton, the works of John Dryden exemplify transumption, revealing "a novel kind of capitalist poetics, relying on the representation of the spice trade...Spice is not a balm, but an object of trade, a trope to be carried across boundaries, standing in for money: a metaphor about metaphor." Carrying this idea forward to the Romantic era, Morton critiques the manner in which spice became a metaphor for exotic desire that, subsequently, encapsulated the self-reflexivity of modern processes of commodification.

Later, Morton edited Radical Food: The Culture and Politics of Eating and Drinking, 1790-1820 (2000), a three-volume compendium of eighteenth century texts examining the literary, sociocultural, and political history of food, including works on intoxication, cannibalism, and slavery. They also edited Cultures of Taste/Theories of Appetite: Eating Romanticism (2004), a collection of essays that problematizes the use of taste and appetite as Romantic metaphors for bounded territories and subjectivities, while empirically interrogating the organization of Romantic cultural and economic structures around competing logics of consumption.

=== Ecological theory ===
Since 2009, Morton has engaged in a sustained project of ecological critique, primarily enunciated in two works, Ecology Without Nature (2009) and The Ecological Thought (2010), through which they problematize environmental theory from the standpoint of ecological entanglement. In Ecology Without Nature, Morton proposes that an ecological criticism must be divested of the bifurcation of nature and civilization, or the idea that nature exists as something that sustains civilization, but exists outside of society's walls. As Morton states:

Ecological writing keeps insisting that we are "embedded" in nature. Nature is a surrounding medium that sustains our being. Due to the properties of the rhetoric that evokes the idea of a surrounding medium, ecological writing can never properly establish that this is nature and thus provide a compelling and consistent aesthetic basis for the new worldview that is meant to change society. It is a small operation, like tipping over a domino... Putting something called Nature on a pedestal and admiring it from afar does for the environment what patriarchy does for the figure of Woman. It is a paradoxical act of sadistic admiration.

Viewing "nature," in the putative sense, as an arbitrary textual signifier, Morton theorizes artistic representations of the environment as sites for opening ideas of nature to new possibilities. Seeking an aesthetic mode that can account for the differential, paradoxical, and nonidentificational character of the environment, they propose a materialist method of textual analysis called 'ambient poetics', in which artistic texts of all kinds are considered in terms of how they manage the space in which they appear, thereby attuning the sensibilities of their audience to forms of natural representation that contravene the ideological coding of nature as a transcendent principle. Historicizing this form of poetics permits the politicization of environmental art and its 'ecomimesis', or authenticating evocation of the author's environment, such that the experience of its phenomena becomes present for and shared with the audience.

Art is also an important theme in The Ecological Thought, a "prequel" to Ecology Without Nature, in which Morton proposes the concept of 'dark ecology' as a means of expressing the "irony, ugliness, and horror" of ecology. From the vantage point of dark ecology, there exists no neutral theoretical ground on which to articulate ecological claims. Instead, all beings always are already implicated within the ecological, necessitating an acknowledgement of coexistential difference for coping with ecological catastrophe that, according to Morton, "has already occurred."

Closely related to dark ecology is Morton's concept of the 'mesh'. Defining the ecological thought as "the thinking of interconnectedness," Morton thus uses 'mesh' to refer to the interconnectedness of all living and non-living things, consisting of "infinite connections and infinitesimal differences." They explain:

The ecological thought does, indeed, consist in the ramifications of the "truly wonderful fact" of the mesh. All life forms are the mesh, and so are all the dead ones, as are their habitats, which are also made up of living and nonliving beings. We know even more now about how life forms have shaped Earth (think of oil, of oxygen—the first climate change cataclysm). We drive around using crushed dinosaur parts. Iron is mostly a by-product of bacterial metabolism. So is oxygen. Mountains can be made of shells and fossilized bacteria. Death and the mesh go together in another sense, too, because natural selection implies extinction.

The mesh has no central position that privileges any one form of being over others, and thereby erases definitive interior and exterior boundaries of beings. Emphasizing the interdependence of beings, the ecological thought "permits no distance," such that all beings are said to relate to each other in a totalizing open system, negatively and differentially, rendering ambiguous those entities with which we presume familiarity. Morton calls these ambiguously inscribed beings 'strange strangers', or beings unable to be completely comprehended and labeled. Within the mesh, even the strangeness of strange strangers relating coexistentially is strange, meaning that the more we know about an entity, the stranger it becomes. Intimacy, then, becomes threatening because it veils the mesh beneath the illusion of familiarity.

=== Object-oriented ontology ===
Morton became involved with object-oriented ontology after their ecological writings were favorably compared with the movement's ideas. One way that their work can be distinguished from other variants of object-oriented thought is by its focus on the causal dimension of object relations. Against traditional causal philosophies, Morton argues that causality is an aesthetic dimension of relations between objects, wherein sensory experience does not indicate direct access to reality, but rather an uncanny interruption of the false ontic equilibrium of an interobjective system. Causation, in this view, is held to be illusion-like or "magical," forming the core of what Morton terms "realist magic."

==== Hyperobjects ====
In The Ecological Thought, Morton employed the term hyperobjects to describe objects that are so massively distributed in time and space as to transcend spatiotemporal specificity, such as global warming, styrofoam, and radioactive plutonium. They have subsequently enumerated five characteristics of hyperobjects:

1. Viscous: Hyperobjects adhere to any other object they touch, no matter how hard an object tries to resist. In this way, hyperobjects overrule ironic distance, meaning that the more an object tries to resist a hyperobject, the more glued to the hyperobject it becomes.
2. Molten: Hyperobjects are so massive that they refute the idea that spacetime is fixed, concrete, and consistent.
3. Nonlocal: Hyperobjects are massively distributed in time and space to the extent that their totality cannot be realized in any particular local manifestation. For example, global warming is a hyperobject which impacts meteorological conditions, such as tornado formation. According to Morton, though, entities don't feel global warming, but instead experience tornadoes as they cause damage in specific places. Thus, nonlocality describes the manner in which a hyperobject becomes more substantial than the local manifestations it produces.
4. Phased: Hyperobjects occupy a higher-dimensional space than other entities can normally perceive. Thus, hyperobjects appear to come and go in three-dimensional space, but would appear differently if an observer could have a higher multidimensional view.
5. Interobjective: Hyperobjects are formed by relations between more than one object. Consequently, entities are only able to perceive the imprint, or "footprint," of a hyperobject upon other objects, revealed as information. For example, global warming is formed by interactions between the sun, fossil fuels, and carbon dioxide, among other objects. Yet global warming is made apparent through emissions levels, temperature changes, and ocean levels, making it seem as if global warming is a product of scientific models, rather than an object that predates its own measurement.

According to Morton, hyperobjects not only become visible during an age of ecological crisis, but alert humans to the ecological dilemmas defining the age in which they live. Additionally, the existential capacity of hyperobjects to outlast a turn toward less materialistic cultural values, coupled with the threat many such objects pose toward organic matter (what Morton calls a "demonic inversion of the sacred substances of religion"), gives them a potential spiritual quality, in which their treatment by future societies may become indistinguishable from reverential care.

Although the concept of hyperobjects has been widely adopted by artists, literary critics, and some philosophers, it is not without its critics. Ecocritic Ursula K. Heise for example, notes that in Morton's definition, everything can be considered a hyperobject, which seems to make the concept somewhat meaningless, not to mention seemingly impossible to define clearly. As a result, Heise argues that Morton makes "so many self-cancelling claims about hyperobjects that coherent argument vanishes like the octopuses that disappear in several chapters in their clouds of ink, Morton's favorite metaphor for the withdrawal of objects from the grasp of human knowledge."

Morton’s approach has sparked a contentious debate, with some arguing it’s overly harsh and disempowering. Consequently, it has faced significant backlash. Morton states “they wouldn’t write Hyperobjects again today, they say, or not the same way. They don’t want to scare people anymore—things are already scary enough.”

== Bibliography ==
=== Authored works ===
- 1994. Shelley and the Revolution in Taste: The Body and the Natural World (Cambridge University Press)
- 2000. Radical Food: The Culture and Politics of Eating and Drinking, 1790-1820 (Routledge)
- 2000. The Poetics of Spice: Romantic Consumerism and the Exotic (Cambridge University Press)
- 2002. Mary Shelley's Frankenstein: A Routledge Study Guide and Sourcebook (Routledge)
- 2002. Radicalism in British Literary Culture, 1650-1830 (Cambridge University Press)
- 2004. Cultures of Taste/Theories of Appetite: Eating Romanticism (Palgrave Macmillan)
- 2006. The Cambridge Companion to Shelley (Cambridge University Press)
- 2007. Ecology Without Nature: Rethinking Environmental Aesthetics (Harvard University Press)
- 2010. The Ecological Thought (Harvard University Press)
- 2013. Realist Magic: Objects, Ontology, Causality (Open Humanities Press)
- 2013. Hyperobjects: Philosophy and Ecology after the End of the World (University of Minnesota Press)
- 2015. Nothing: Three Inquiries in Buddhism (University of Chicago Press, with Marcus Boon and Eric Cazdyn)
- 2016. Dark Ecology: For a Logic of Future Coexistence (Columbia University Press)
- 2017. Humankind: Solidarity with Non-Human People (Verso Books)
- 2018. Being Ecological (Pelican Books)
- 2021. Spacecraft (Bloomsbury Academic)
- 2021. Hyposubjects: On Becoming Human (Open Humanities Press, with Dominic Boyer)
- 2023. The Stuff of Life: (Bloomsbury)
- 2024. Hell: In Search of a Christian Ecology (Columbia University Press)

== Interviews ==
- Literature and Ecology (Interview, What's the Word?, 2009)
- On The Ecological Thought (Interview, ROROTOKO, 30 April 2010)
- Philosophy in a Time of Error (Interview with Peter Gratton, 10 May 2010)
- New APPS Interview (Interview with John Protevi, New APPS: Art, Politics, Philosophy, Science, 16 February 2011)
- Our Beautiful Speech Bubbles (Interview with Doug Lain, Diet Soap Podcast #115, 12 August 2011)
- Rethinking Ecology (Interview with C. S. Soong, Against the Grain, 1 November 2011)
- The Borders of Society (Interview with Caroline Picard, Bad at Sports, 11 January 2012)
- Long Conversation Episode 10: Timothy Morton (Interview with Aengus Anderson, The Conversation, 11 June 2012)
- A Polar Bear Called Suzan (Interview with Lisa Doeland, De Groene Amsterdammer, 1 August 2013, 50–51.)
- Are You a Romantic? (Conversation with Jeff Carreira, Evolutionary Collective, 10 December 2013.)
- TIMOTHY MORTON with Greg Lindquist (Conversation with painter Greg Lindquist, The Brooklyn Rail, 2013)
