= PostCapitalism =

2015 book by Paul Mason

PostCapitalism: A Guide to Our Future
- Cover of the first edition
- Author: Paul Mason
- Language: English
- Subject: Capitalism
- Published: 2015
- Publisher: Allen Lane
- Publication place: United Kingdom
- Media type: Print (paperback)
- ISBN: 9781846147388

PostCapitalism: A Guide to Our Future is a 2015 book by British journalist and writer Paul Mason.

In the book, Mason discusses the existential threat posed to capitalism by the digital revolution. He argues that the digital revolution has the potential to reshape utterly our familiar notions of work, production and value; and to destroy an economy based on markets and private ownership. In fact, he contends, this is already happening. He points to parallel currencies, co-operatives, self-managed online spaces, and even Wikipedia as examples of what the postcapitalist future might look like. Mason argues that from the ashes of the 2008 financial crisis, we have the chance to create a more socially just and sustainable global economy.

== Synopsis ==
Section 1 draws particularly on the ideas of Nikolai Kondratiev, alongside Karl Marx, Rudolf Hilferding, Rosa Luxemburg, and Joseph Schumpeter. Mason notes the cyclical crises in capitalist economies, epitomised by the 2008 financial crisis, and seeks to understand them in terms of Kondratiev's 'wave theory': industrial economies tend to experience wave-like cycles of roughly 25 years' growth followed by 25 years' decline ending in crises that foreshadow the next period of growth (c. 1780–1848, 1848–90s, 1890s–1945, late 1940s–2008).

Mason argues that in earlier cycles, capitalists were prevented from adapting to crises by reducing workers' wages because of organised labour. This forced capitalists to adapt more radically, through technological innovation. The defeat of organised labour associated with the rise of neoliberalism around 1979 has enabled the extension of the stagnating fourth wave: "instead of being forced to innovate their way out of the crisis using technology, as during the late stage of all three previous cycles, the 1 per cent simply imposed penury and atomization on the working class" (p. 93).

Section 2 builds on Marx's Fragment on Machines, supporting the labour theory of value over the marginal utility theory, and drawing particularly on Jeremy Rifkin's The Zero Marginal Cost Society, Peter Drucker's Post-Capitalist Society, and the work of Paul Romer. As Marx speculated, many commodities, such as software, music, and designs for objects to be reproduced by machines, can now be reproduced at virtually no cost (i.e. zero marginal cost). These developments render economic theories predicated on scarcity increasingly irrelevant. Moreover, significant commodities in the digital economy are free and open-source (FOSS) and non-capitalist, such as Linux, Firefox, and Wikipedia.

As the information economy grows and human labour is replaced, the need for work should diminish. "Today, the main contradiction in modern capitalism is between the possibility of free, abundant socially produced goods, and a system of monopolies, banks and governments struggling to maintain control over power and information. That is, everything is pervaded by a fight between network and hierarchy" (p. 144).

Mason traces how neoliberal policies have successfully undermined working-class solidarity by, for example, promoting labour mobility and constraining unions. In addition he sees a new form of resistance emerging among "networked individuals".

Section 3 sketches a road-map to a utopian post-capitalist global society, harnessing zero-marginal-cost production, and seeking to avoid the failings of twentieth-century Communism and capitalism. A key reference point is Alexander Bogdanov's 1908 novel Red Star. The section articulates "five principles of transition", all envisaged operating through non-hierarchical social networks:

1. To use massive amounts of real data to understand, model, and test ideas for social change so that they fit observable trends in human behaviour.
2. Ecological sustainability.
3. Ensuring that a transition to post-capitalism is not conceptualised simply in economic terms, but in wider human terms.
4. To address problems with diverse approaches, rather than attempting monolithic solutions.
5. Maximise the power of information.

Key goals are:

1. Rapidly reduce carbon emissions to stay below 2 °C warming by 2050.
2. Stabilise and socialise the global finance system.
3. Prioritise information-rich technologies to deliver material prosperity and solve social challenges such as ill health and welfare dependency.
4. Gear technology towards minimising necessary work, until work becomes voluntary and economic management can focus on energy and resources rather than capital and labour.

Suggested means to achieve this include:

- Model policies thoroughly using abundant data before implementing them.
- Tackle public debt, not through neoliberal privatisation and austerity, but partly by closing down offshore banking and by holding interest rates below inflation rates.
- Promote (partly through state support/regulations) collaborative/co-operative/non-profit forms of work and creative commons production, rather than highly unequal, autocratic and/or rent-seeking business models.
- Break up monopolies or, where this is impractical, socialise them.
- Socialise the finance system (via a transitional phase of re-regulating the finance sector).
- Pay everyone a basic income.

== Reception ==
The political scientist David Runciman praised the book in The Guardian, writing that as "a slice of futurology this book is no better than its many, equally speculative rivals. But as a spark to the imagination, with frequent x-ray flashes of insight into the way we live now, it is hard to beat. In that sense, Mason is a worthy successor to Marx".

Adam Booth, writing for Marxist.com, wrote that "despite its limitations, PostCapitalism is an extremely useful read for anyone who wants a thorough and revealing insight into the contradictions of capitalism and how they are manifested today in this era of information and the internet."

In the Financial Times, Gillian Tett wrote "Even if you love the current capitalist system, it would be a mistake to ignore the book. For Mason weaves together varied intellectual threads to produce a fascinating set of ideas" but criticised the writing as being "sometimes infused with such anger that it feels irritatingly shrill".

PostCapitalism was also reviewed in The Independent, The Irish Times, the Daily Telegraph and The Times.
