= Post-Capitalist Society =

1993 book by Peter Drucker

- Author: Peter Drucker
- Publisher: HarperCollins
- Publication date: 1993
- ISBN: 0887306209

Post-Capitalist Society (1993) is a book by management professor and sociologist Peter Drucker.

== Overview ==
The book states that the "First World Nations" and in particular the United States have entered a post-capitalism system of production where the capital is no longer present because it doesn't belong to one person or family but to a series of organizations such as insurance companies, banks, etc. Because of this, normal citizens become virtually owners of the great American enterprises, being owners of the capital, therefore, not destroying but overcoming the capitalism. The book foresees that the post-capitalist society will become a society of organizations where every organization will be highly specialized in its particular field.

The book states that knowledge, rather than capital, land, or labor, is the new basis of wealth. The classes of a fully post-capitalist society are expected to be divided into knowledge workers or service workers, in contrast to the capitalists and proletarians of a capitalist society. Drucker estimated the transformation to post-capitalism would be completed in 2010–2020. Drucker also argued for rethinking the concept of intellectual property by creating a universal licensing system.
