= Punctum Books =

American publisher

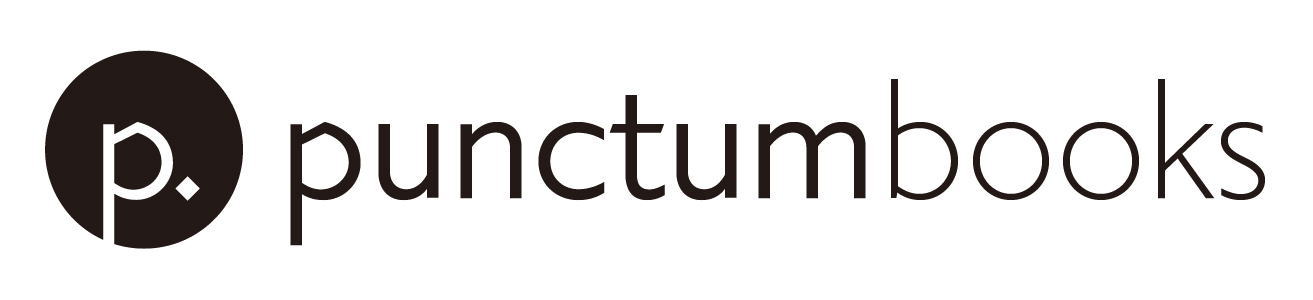
- Founded: 2011
- Founder: Eileen A. Joy, Nicola Masciandaro
- Country of origin: United States of America
- Headquarters location: Santa Barbara, California
- Publication types: Books
- Owner(s): Eileen A. Joy, Vincent W. J. van Gerven Oei
- No. of employees: 5
- Official website: punctumbooks.com

Punctum Books, stylized as punctum books, is an open-access and print-on-demand independent, scholar-led publisher based in Santa Barbara, California, United States.

== History ==
The imprint was co-founded in 2011 by Eileen A. Joy (a medievalist and advocate of open access) and Nicola Masciandaro (Brooklyn College, CUNY), who left the project in 2012. The imprint was conceived partly as an offshoot of the BABEL Working Group, a "non-hierarchical scholarly collective" with an emphasis on medieval studies. Punctum Books was joined in 2016 by co-director Vincent W. J. van Gerven Oei. Since its inception, Punctum Books has sought to bring scholarly works, often with a transdisciplinary or unconventional nature, to a broader public. It publishes print editions through Kindle Direct Publishing, but buyers can get a PDF version of the book for free through the publisher's website.

In the past, Punctum Books published issues of the journals Anarchist Developments in Cultural Studies, Badiou Studies, Contention: The Multidisciplinary Journal of Social Protest, Helvete: A Journal of Black Metal Theory, Itineration: Cross-Disciplinary Studies in Rhetoric, Media and Culture, Networks and Neighbours, O-Zone: A Journal of Object Oriented Studies, Radical Criminology, and Speculations: A Journal of Speculative Realism.

Punctum Books was a partner on the Community-led Open Publication Infrastructures for Monographs (COPIM) project which ran from 2019-2023, and is now a partner on the Open Book Futures project funded by the Arcadia Fund and Research England.

== See also ==
- Open Book Publishers
- Open Humanities Press
