= Duncan Weldon (journalist) =

Economic journalist

- Born: Peter Duncan Weldon; 1982 (age 43–44); Northumberland, England, UK
- Education: Somerville College, Oxford
- Occupation: Journalist
- Employer: The Economist (2019-present)
- Political party: Labour Party

Duncan Weldon (born 1982) is a British journalist, and former political advisor, researcher, and market strategist.

Weldon studied Philosophy, Politics and Economics at Somerville College, Oxford. He joined the Labour Party at age 18.

He is currently the Britain economics correspondent at The Economist, and has been with the newspaper since 2019. An economist by background he began his career at the Bank of England. Other early roles included asset management (including four years in fund management, becoming a partner at Senhouse Capital), a researcher and economics advisor for the Labour Party, and senior economist at the Trades Union Congress.

Weldon was appointed as BBC Newsnight's Economics and Business editor in 2014. He announced his departure from the BBC in November 2015, following which he became head of research at the financial investment firm Resolution Group. He was briefly at Legal & General Investment Management between February and October 2019, as a strategist on the asset allocation team, advising on investment research and allocation decisions.

Weldon previously wrote blogs at the Left Foot Forward website and LabourList. He is the author of Two Hundred Years of Muddling Through: The Surprising Story of Britain's Economy From Boom to Bust and Back Again (2022) and Blood & Treasure: The Economics of Conflict from the Vikings to Ukraine (2025).

Media offices
Preceded by Paul Mason	Economics Editor: BBC Newsnight; 2014 – present	Succeeded by
