= Paul Mason (journalist) =

British journalist (born 1960)

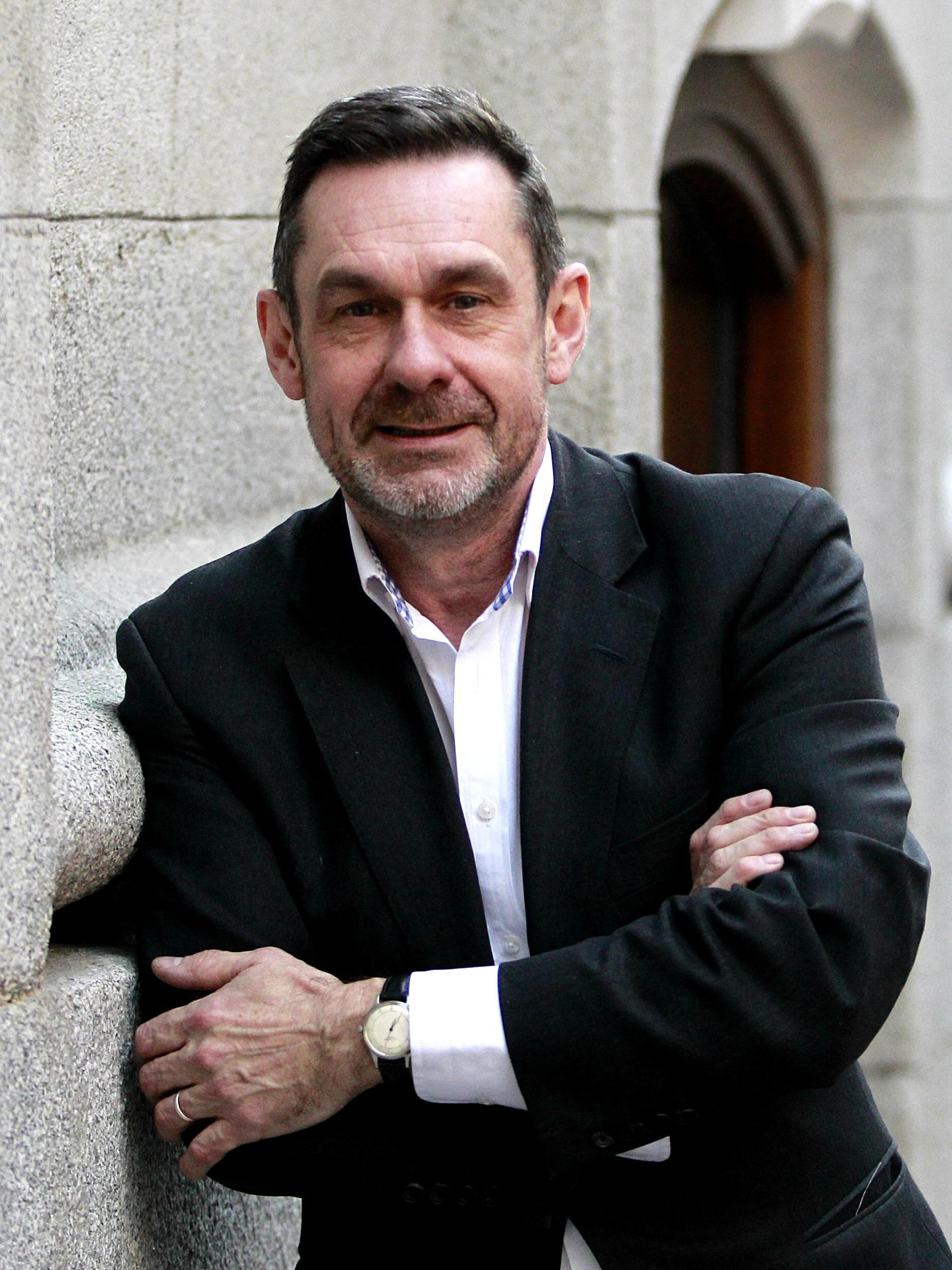
- Mason in 2016
- Born: 1960 (age 65–66); Leigh, Lancashire, England
- Education: University of Sheffield; Institute of Education
- Occupations: Journalist, broadcaster
- Years active: 1991–present
- Employers: BBC (2001–2013); ITN (Channel 4 News) (2013–2016)
- Political party: Labour
- Other political affiliations: Workers' Power (UK) (Previously)
- Spouse: Jane Bruton

Paul Mason (born 1960) is a British journalist. He writes a weekly column at The New European and monthly columns for Social Europe and Frankfurter Rundschau. He was Business Correspondent and then Economics Editor of the BBC Two television programme Newsnight from 2001, and Culture and Digital Editor of Channel 4 News from 2013, becoming the programme's Economics Editor in 2014. He left Channel 4 in 2016. He is the author of several books.

In 2026, Mason was appointed an Honorary Senior Research Fellow at the University of Exeter's Centre for the Public Understanding of Defence and Security.

== Early life and education ==
Mason was born in Leigh, Lancashire. One grandparent was a miner and another was a Lithuanian-Jewish violinist.

Mason was educated at Thornleigh Salesian College in Bolton and graduated from the University of Sheffield with a degree in music and politics in 1981 and trained to be a music teacher at London University Institute of Education, after which he undertook postgraduate research into the music of the Second Viennese School at the University of Sheffield until 1984.

Mason worked as a musician and lectured at Loughborough University.

== Journalism and broadcasting ==
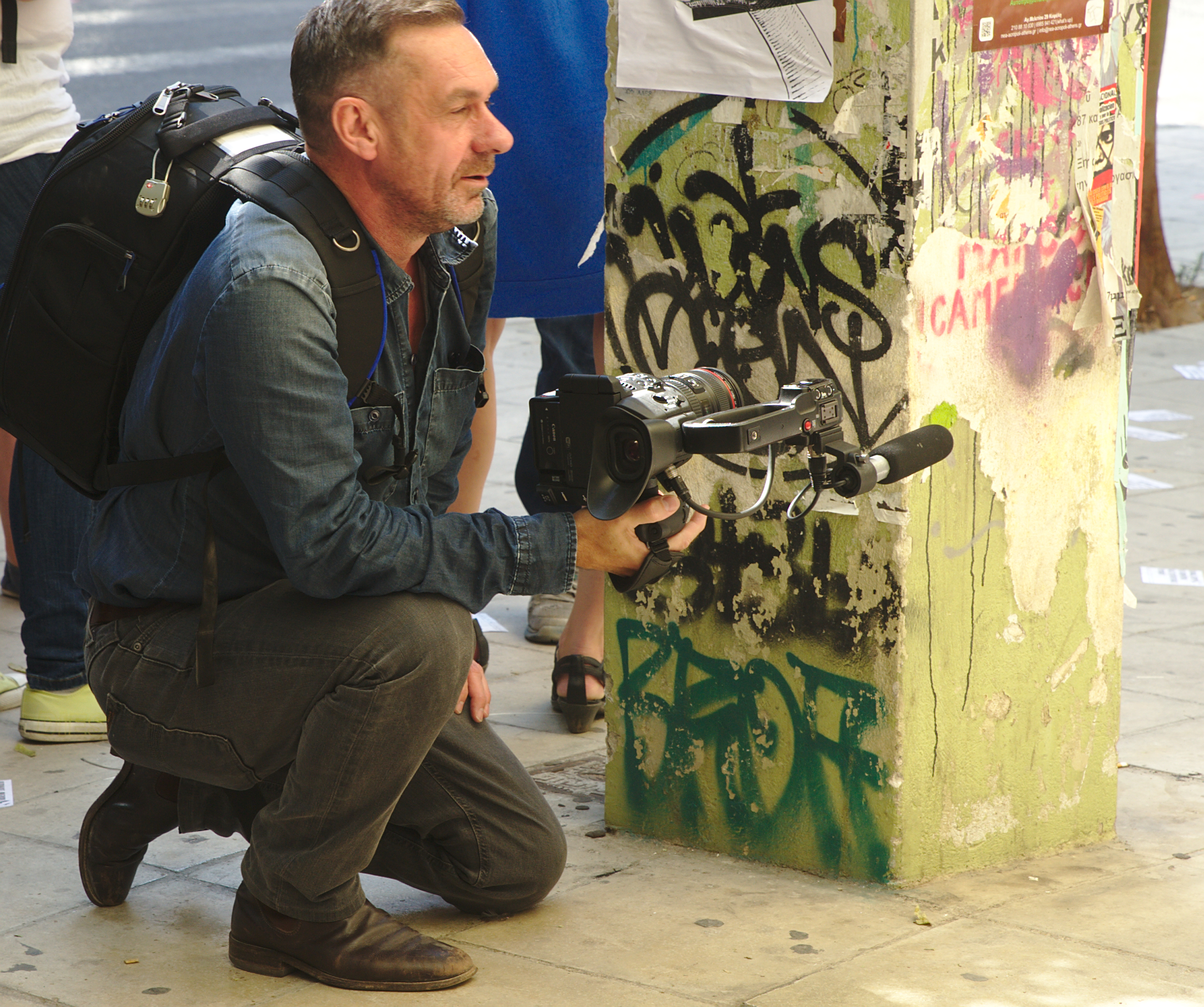
Mason in Athens during Greek elections, reporting for Channel 4 News, 20 September 2015

Mason has lived in London since 1988, becoming a freelance journalist around 1991. From 1995 to 2001 he worked for Reed Business Information, a division of Reed Elsevier, on titles including Contract Journal, Community Care and Computer Weekly, of which he was deputy editor.

In August 2001, Mason joined the BBC Two television programme Newsnight as Business Editor. His first live appearance on Newsnight was on the day of the September 11 attacks in 2001.

Mason wrote a blog for Newsnight called "Idle Scrawl".

Between 13 June 2007 and 4 July 2007, Mason presented Spinning Yarns, a four-part series on the history of the cotton industry for BBC Radio 4. Mason appeared in the first episode of the five-part BBC series Credit Crash Britain, first broadcast on BBC Two on 30 October 2008.

Mason attended the Wigan Casino in his youth as a follower of Northern Soul and hosted a documentary about the Northern Soul scene for the BBC's The Culture Show in September 2013.

In August 2013, it was announced that Mason would join Channel 4 News as its culture and digital editor. In May 2014, it was announced that he would become the programme's Economics Editor at the beginning of the following month, replacing Faisal Islam.

Mason announced in February 2016 that he was leaving his position at Channel 4 News in favour of freelancing so he could engage more fully in debates without the constraint of impartiality observed by broadcasters in the UK.

His four-part documentary series #ThisIsACoup covered the 2015 Greek crisis from inside and outside the corridors of power. His five-part documentary series K is for Karl commemorated the ideas of Karl Marx on the 200th anniversary of Marx's birth. His four-part series, R is for Rosa, was commissioned by the Rosa Luxemburg Foundation to mark the centenary of the Polish-German revolutionary.

As of 2024, he wrote for The Spectator, The New European, Frankfurter Rundschau and Social Europe.

== Think-tanks and academia ==
In May 2024, he became Aneurin Bevan Associate Fellow in Defence and Resilience at the think tank Council on Geostrategy. In 2025, he became a regular participant in the Council on Geostrategy Defence Talks: Securing UK Advantage podcast, discussing geopolitics and defence.

In March 2026, Mason was appointed an Honorary Senior Research Fellow at the University of Exeter's Centre for the Public Understanding of Defence and Security (CPUDS). In the announcement Mason noted that the 2026 Iran war and the ongoing Ukraine conflict increased the "need for active scholarship of security, resilience and defence" and that he was proud that the university was "among the institutions ready to seize the opportunities that rearmament brings". The announcement noted that Mason had "helped develop the current government's Defence Industrial Strategy through the Defence Industrial Joint Council and the Defence Universities Alliance" which the university was members of. He is listed as a university external expert, particularly for the public's knowledge and understanding of defence and security, and will assist research into whole-of-society home defence and national resilience.

== Plays ==
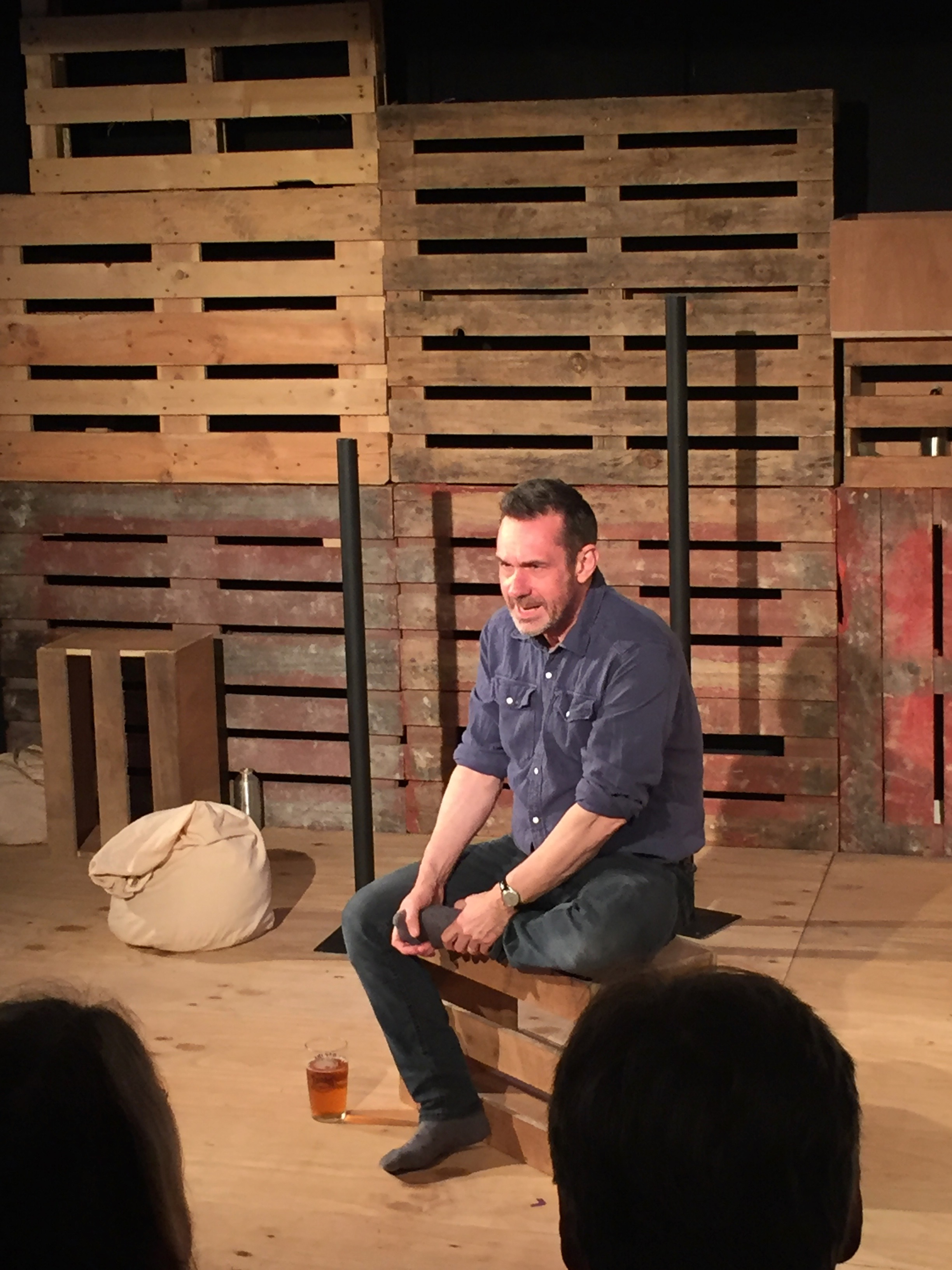
Mason answering questions on the set of Divine Chaos of Starry Things in London in May 2017

In 2017, Mason wrote Divine Chaos of Starry Things, a two act play looking at the life of Louise Michel and other exiles from the 1871 Paris Commune in exile in New Caledonia. The Guardian described it as "a frustrating, clunky but always intelligent drama focusing on the women in New Caledonia, and particularly the revolutionary Louise Michel. While her comrades take refuge in drink and hopes of appeal against their sentences, Michel keeps the red flag flying. She recognises that the oppression of the Kanaks and of the Parisian working class are one and the same".

In July 2017 Mason's play Why It's Kicking Off Everywhere was produced by the Young Vic Theatre, London and televised on BBC TWO. He appeared onstage playing himself, in a dramatisation of his experiences during the Occupy movement and the Arab Spring.

== Awards ==
Mason won the Wincott Prize for Business Journalism in 2003, the Workworld Broadcaster of the Year in 2004, and the Diageo African Business Reporting Award in 2007. In 2020 he was awarded the Erich Fromm Prize. In 2018 he was awarded the Ellen Meiksins Wood Prize by the Broadbent Institute, a Canadian think tank allied to the New Democratic Party.

== Political consulting ==
Mason is the sole director of a political consulting and media firm called Exarcheia Ltd. The Spectator reported that Independent Parliamentary Standards Authority records showed that John Healey, a member of the then-shadow front bench, used Exarcheia's services in 2021.

== Politics ==
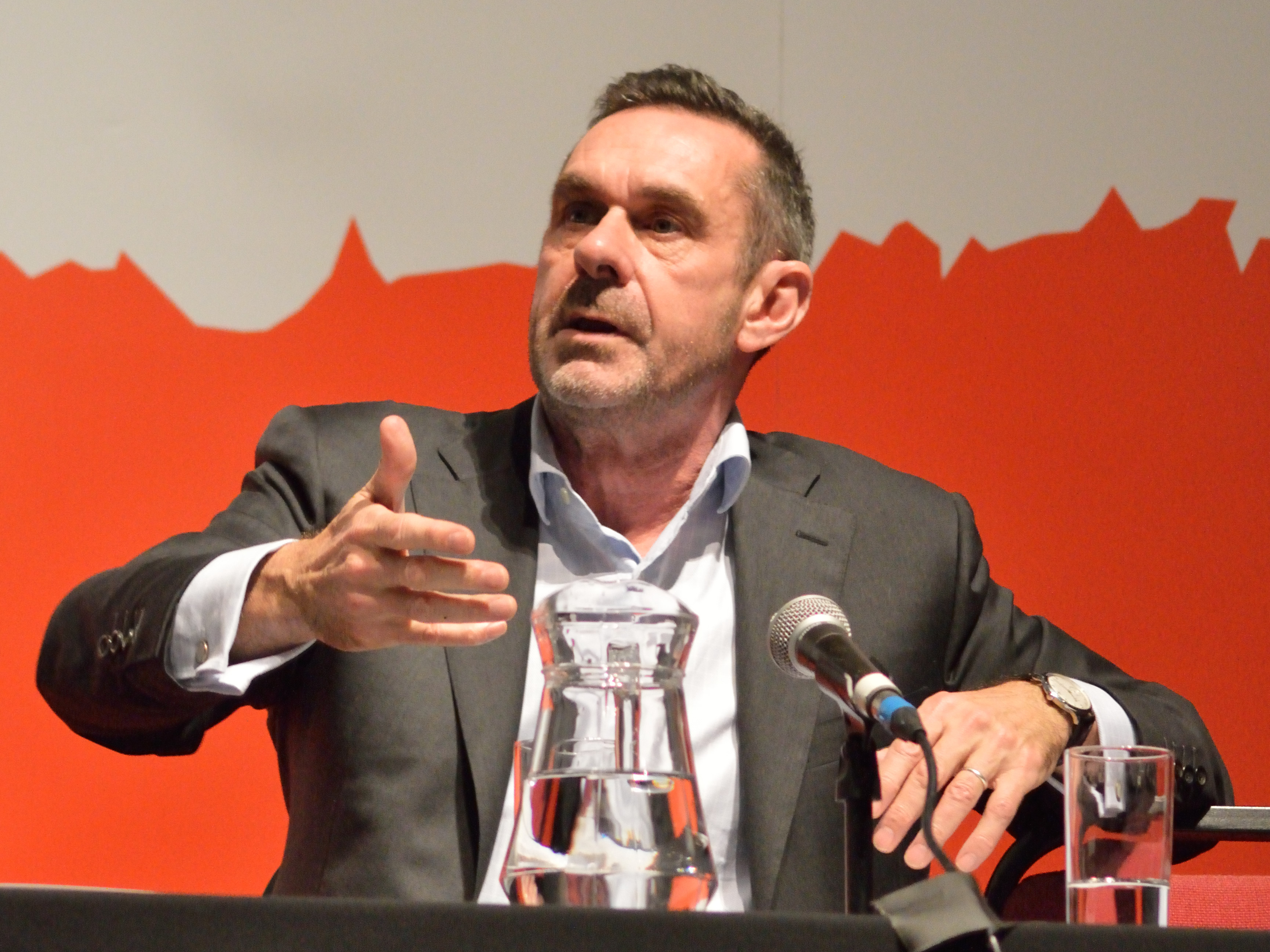
Mason speaking in 2018

=== Early left-wing politics ===
Mason is a former member of the Workers' Power group. He responded to an interviewer from the Evening Standard in 2011: "It's on Wikipedia that I was, so it must be true. It's fair to say I was a Leftie activist. What my politics are now are very complicated." In an interview with The Independent in 2015, he described himself as having been a "supporter" of the group.

In a speech in 2015 marking the publication of Naomi Klein's book This Changes Everything, he declared that "capitalism is dying". Mason has called for an alliance of "bond traders from Canary Wharf, arm in arm with placard-carrying Trots" against right-wing populist groups such as UKIP. Mason later described UKIP voters in unfavourable terms, stating, "They are toe-rags, basically. They are the bloke who nicks your bike".

In 2016, Mason distanced himself from his former involvement in far-left Trotskyist politics, by saying that he no longer holds such views and identifies with a "radical social democracy". Responding to comments by the then-Chancellor of the Exchequer George Osborne, he said:

As to Mr Osborne's claim that I am "revolutionary Marxist" it is completely inaccurate. I am radical social democrat who favours the creation of a peer-to-peer sector (co-ops, open source etc) alongside the market and the state, as part of a long transition to a post-capitalist economy. There's a comprehensive critique of Bolshevism in my latest book, Postcapitalism: A Guide to Our Future.

Mason subsequently wrote positively about Marxism: in a piece for New Statesman published in May 2018 for the bicentenary of Marx's birth, he praised Marxist humanism inspired by Marx's Economic and Philosophic Manuscripts of 1844 in general, and the thought of Raya Dunayevskaya in particular, for its emphasis on overcoming alienation from labour in order to achieve individual freedom, whilst criticising the authoritarianism of Stalinism and the structural Marxism of the likes of Louis Althusser. In another New Statesman article published the following year he described himself as an "actual Marxist", whilst critiquing determinist interpretations of Marx which posit Marxism as a "theory of everything".

=== Labour Party support ===
In June 2016, Mason supported Labour Party leader Jeremy Corbyn after mass resignations from his cabinet and a leadership challenge. He wrote in The Guardian: "But one thing I do know: Corbyn is incapable of lying to the British people; he is inured to elite politics; he didn't spend his entire life in a Machiavellian project to gain power and an invitation to Oleg Deripaska's yacht. That's why I voted for him and will do so again if you trigger a leadership vote."

In September 2016, he wrote on Medium: "It is a genuine movement of the Labour left; it stands in the long tradition of radical social democracy, going back to Robert Blatchford’s Clarion movement before 1914, or the ILP in the 1920s. [...] Instead of attacking Momentum, any social democrat with an ounce of knowledge of Labour history should welcome it, even if they disagree with its politics."

In the New Statesman magazine in June 2018, Mason argued the case for state suppression of "fascists", saying that he favoured a policy of using "the full panoply of security measures to deter and monitor" those he described as "racists" and added: "For clarity, unlike many on the left, that means I am in favour of state suppression of fascist groups." He finished his article by saying that "The progressive half of Britain needs a narrative to overcome this threat: a narrative based on shared, historic values of democracy and tolerance", and also "[to] stop pandering to right-wing nationalism and xenophobia and start fighting it."

Mason long supported the need for radical action on climate change, at least from 2014. In 2019, Mason supported the US Green New Deal legislation proposal. Later that year Martin Wolf characterised Mason's views in the Financial Times as justifying a planned economy, quoting Mason saying in support of the UK A Green New Deal report "Labour wants to combat climate change through three mechanisms: state spending, state lending and the state direction of private finance."

In May 2022, in a The Spectator podcast, Mason said he was a supporter of Keir Starmer as Labour leader in the aftermath of the Beergate COVID-19 regulations breach allegations.

The same month, Mason was longlisted to be the Labour candidate for the safe seat of Stretford and Urmston in Greater Manchester, succeeding the retiring MP Kate Green. However, he did not make the shortlist, which was announced in June 2022. In October 2022, Mason tried for selection for Sheffield Central to replace Labour MP Paul Bloomfield, but here too did not make the shortlist. In March 2023, Mason stated his intention to run for selection for the new seat of Mid & South Pembrokeshire, but did not make the longlist.

In February 2024, in The Spectator, Mason wrote that he supported Labour abandoning its £28 billion per year climate change spending commitment, after having studied the Office for Budget Responsibility 2023 financial assessment in the light of interest rate increases, and he no longer thought the "case for borrowing to invest in green energy" was valid.

It was reported in July 2023 that Mason was being considered as a candidate by the Labour Party to run in the constituency of Islington North at the next general election. This could require him to run against the former Labour leader and serving Islington North MP, Jeremy Corbyn, who had the Labour Party whip withdrawn, should Corbyn run as an independent candidate. Mason confirmed his intention to apply for selection as the Labour candidate for the constituency in May 2024. Despite having previously supported him as Labour leader, Mason has been critical of Corbyn's record on antisemitism, defence, and Brexit. Mason was not selected for the selection shortlist, which consisted of two London councillors.

== Controversies ==
In 2020, Mason announced that he would not be voting for Rebecca Long-Bailey in the Labour Leadership Election because he "doesn't want Labour's policy on reproductive rights dictated by the Vatican", referencing Long-Bailey being from a Catholic background. This was despite Long-Bailey previously stating that she "unequivocally supports woman's right to choose". This was labelled as "really shocking" by Owen Jones and as "bigoted" by Aaron Bastani.

== Personal life ==
Mason was Father of the Chapel for the National Union of Journalists on Newsnight. He is a supporter of Leigh Leopards rugby league club and Manchester United F.C. He is married to Jane Bruton, who is a nurse. He is an atheist.

== Books ==
- Mason, Paul (2007). Live Working or Die Fighting: How the Working Class Went Global. London: Harvill Secker. ISBN 978-0-436-20615-3. OCLC 988943606.
- Mason, Paul (2009). Meltdown: The End of the Age of Greed. London: Verso. ISBN 978-1-84467-396-4. OCLC 758973731.
- Mason, Paul (2012). Why It's Kicking Off Everywhere: The New Global Revolutions. London: Verso. ISBN 978-1-84467-851-8. OCLC 769192643.
- Mason, Paul (2012). Rare Earth (novel). No Exit. ISBN 978-1-84243-846-6. OCLC 793689777.
- Mason, Paul (2015). PostCapitalism: A Guide to our Future. Allen Lane. ISBN 978-1-84614-738-8. OCLC 932179126.
- Mason, Paul (2019). Clear Bright Future: A Radical Defence of the Human Being. Allen Lane. ISBN 978-0-241-32010-5. OCLC 1088920981.
- Mason, Paul (2021). How To Stop Fascism: History, Ideology, Resistance. Allen Lane. ISBN 978-0-14-199639-4. OCLC 1242384532.
- Mason, Paul (2026). Reds: A Global History of Communism. Bloomsbury Publishing. ISBN 978-1-03-590590-4.

Media offices
Preceded by Stephanie Flanders	Economics Editor: BBC Newsnight; 2008–2013	Succeeded by Duncan Weldon (with Business)
Preceded by Faisal Islam	Economics Editor: Channel Four News; 2014–2016	Vacant
