= Accelerationism =

Ideologies of change via capitalism and technology

Accelerationism is a range of ideologies that call for the use of capitalism and associated processes to create radical social transformations. Broadly, accelerationism engages with antihumanism, as well as posthumanism, and seeks to accelerate desired tendencies within capitalism at the expense of negative ones, though variants differ greatly on which tendencies and if this will lead beyond capitalism or further into it.

Accelerationism originated from philosophers such as Gilles Deleuze and Félix Guattari, who speculated in the 1970s that emancipatory forces within capitalism, particularly deterritorialization, could be radicalized against it and its oppressive aspects. Inspired by these ideas, some University of Warwick faculty and students formed a philosophy collective known as the Cybernetic Culture Research Unit (CCRU) in the 1990s, led by Nick Land. Land and the CCRU drew upon contemporary media and culture such as cyberpunk and jungle music to further develop these ideas. They theorized about a self-revolutionizing capitalism that would culminate in a technological singularity, resulting in artificial intelligence surpassing and eliminating humanity, though they drifted from these ideas and dissolved by the 2000s.

In the 2010s, the movement was termed accelerationism by Benjamin Noys in a critical work, followed by a renewed interest in its ideas. Thinkers such as Nick Srnicek and Alex Williams advocated a left-wing accelerationism based on embracing capitalist technology and infrastructure to move past a stagnant capitalism, exploring themes such as automation of work. This was associated with Prometheanism, which engaged with ideas such as rationalism, posthumanism, and a rejection of limits on change. Land, having moved to China, also engaged with the Dark Enlightenment movement as part of his right-wing accelerationism, rejecting egalitarianism and democracy in favor of CEO-run states to promote the singularity. Effective accelerationism arose with influence from effective altruism to promote technological progress and artificial general intelligence to solve human problems, and ascend the Kardashev scale.

Various other meanings for the term also emerged, such as to worsen capitalism to promote revolution against it, as well as by far-right extremists promoting racial violence and the collapse of society in order to establish a white ethnostate, known as militant accelerationism.

== Background ==
The history of accelerationism has been divided into three waves. First, there were the late 1960s and early 1970s French post-Marxists such as Gilles Deleuze, Félix Guattari, Jean-François Lyotard, and Jean Baudrillard, whose thought arose in the wake of May 68. According to David R. Cole, texts produced during this period had little effect "other than as perhaps scattered art practices", with the result being that "capitalism has emerged as triumphant in the past 50 years, and the idealism of the student 1968 revolution in Paris has subsequently faded." The second wave arose in the 1990s with the work of Nick Land and the CCRU, with the third being the Promethean left-accelerationism of the 2010s.

=== Influences and precursors ===
The term accelerationism was previously used in Roger Zelazny's 1967 novel Lord of Light. It was later popularized by professor and author Benjamin Noys in his 2010 book The Persistence of the Negative to describe the trajectory of certain post-structuralists who embraced unorthodox Marxist and counter-Marxist overviews of capitalist growth, such as Deleuze and Guattari in their 1972 book Anti-Oedipus, Lyotard in his 1974 book Libidinal Economy and Baudrillard in his 1976 book Symbolic Exchange and Death. Noys later stated "at this point, what we can call accelerationism is dedicated to trying to ride these forces of capitalist production and direct them to destabilize capitalism itself."

Patrick Gamez considers the French thinkers' philosophy of desire to be a rejection of orthodox Marxism and psychoanalysis, particularly in Deleuze and Guattari's Capitalism and Schizophrenia. Particularly influential is Deleuze and Guattari's concept of desiring-production; rather than viewing human desire as a lack that is satiated by consumption, they view it as an inhuman flow of productive energy, having no proper organization or purpose. Any normativity or functionalism comes from flows of desire performing work and territorializing until new flows of desire override them in the process of deterritorialization and reterritorialization.

Vincent Le notes that Deleuze and Guattari's model is based on machines; as machines are assemblages of different parts which perform different functions, humans and social bodies are assemblages of "organs" which produce desires. They find capitalism to be the most radically deterritorializing process in history, as it is based on constant deterritorialization rather than a stable code of desire. Le uses the example of sex and food; they are no longer coded only for marriage and sustenance, but rather as commodities which produce other desires. While capitalism tends toward the body without organs, or a state without determinate functions or coded desires, it never reaches that state, as it causes reterritorialization by recoding things as commodity for sale, to be deterritorialized again.

Mark Fisher describes Deleuze and Guattari's model of capitalism as defined by the tension between destroying and re-establishing boundaries, with the inclusion of new and archaic elements seen "where food banks co-exist with iPhones." Gamez describes Land's thought as influenced by the French thinkers' antihumanism, as well as their ambivalence or even celebration of capitalism's destroying of traditional hierarchies and freeing of desire.

Land cited a number of philosophers who expressed anticipatory accelerationist attitudes in his 2017 essay "A Quick-and-Dirty Introduction to Accelerationism". Firstly, Friedrich Nietzsche argued in a fragment in The Will to Power that "the leveling process of European man is the great process which should not be checked: one should even accelerate it." Taking inspiration from this notion for Anti-Oedipus, Deleuze and Guattari speculated further on an unprecedented "revolutionary path" to perpetuate capitalism's tendencies, a passage which is cited as a central inspiration for accelerationism:

But which is the revolutionary path? Is there one?—To withdraw from the world market, as Samir Amin advises Third World countries to do, in a curious revival of the fascist "economic solution"? Or might it be to go in the opposite direction? To go still further, that is, in the movement of the market, of decoding and deterritorialization? For perhaps the flows are not yet deterritorialized enough, not decoded enough, from the viewpoint of a theory and a practice of a highly schizophrenic character. Not to withdraw from the process, but to go further, to "accelerate the process," as Nietzsche put it: in this matter, the truth is that we haven't seen anything yet.

— Gilles Deleuze and Félix Guattari, Anti-Oedipus

Fisher describes Land's interpretation of this passage as explicitly anti-Marxist. Land cited Karl Marx, who, in his 1848 speech "On the Question of Free Trade", anticipated accelerationist principles a century before Deleuze and Guattari by describing free trade as socially destructive and fuelling class conflict, then effectively arguing for it:

But, in general, the protective system of our day is conservative, while the free trade system is destructive. It breaks up old nationalities and pushes the antagonism of the proletariat and the bourgeoisie to the extreme point. In a word, the free trade system hastens the social revolution. It is in this revolutionary sense alone, gentlemen, that I vote in favor of free trade.

— Karl Marx, "On the Question of Free Trade"

Maya B. Kronic (Note: Sources are credited to Robin Mackay, who has since changed their name to Maya B. Kronic.) and Armen Avanessian note "Fragment on Machines" from Grundrisse as Marx's "most openly accelerationist writing". Noys states of Marx's influence, "it favors the Marx who celebrates the powers of capitalism, most evident in The Communist Manifesto (cowritten with Engels), over the Marx who also stresses the difficulty of transcending and escaping capital, the Marx of Capital", also characterizing the accelerationist view of Marx as filtered through Nietzsche. Sam Sellar and Cole state that while he was dismissive of Marxists, Land studied works such as Capital and Grundrusse as "exemplary analyses of how capital works".

Sellar and Cole attribute Land's ideas to continental philosophers such as Immanuel Kant, Arthur Schopenhauer, Nietzsche, Martin Heidegger, Georges Bataille, and Deleuze. Paul Haynes notes Bataille's concepts of general economy and excess, which Land wrote about for The Thirst for Annihilation, and McKenzie Wark notes Bataille's solar economy as key to Land along with a non-vitalist interpretation of Deleuze and Guattari. Fisher notes the same excerpt from Anti-Oedipus as Land, along with a section from Libidinal Economy, as "immediately [giving] the flavour of the accelerationist gambit":

The English unemployed did not have to become workers to survive, they – hang on tight and spit on me – enjoyed the hysterical, masochistic, whatever exhaustion it was of hanging on in the mines, in the foundries, in the factories, in hell, they enjoyed it, enjoyed the mad destruction of their organic body which was indeed imposed upon them, they enjoyed the decomposition of their personal identity, the identity that the peasant tradition had constructed for them, enjoyed the dissolutions of their families and villages, and enjoyed the new monstrous anonymity of the suburbs and the pubs in morning and evening.

— Jean-François Lyotard, Libidinal Economy

Nick Srnicek and Alex Williams additionally credit Vladimir Lenin with recognizing that the development of capitalist forces was important in the subsequent foundation of a socialist system:

Socialism is inconceivable without large-scale capitalist engineering based on the latest discoveries of modern science. It is inconceivable without planned state organisation which keeps tens of millions of people to the strictest observance of a unified standard in production and distribution. We Marxists have always spoken of this, and it is not worth while wasting two seconds talking to people who do not understand even this (anarchists and a good half of the Left Socialist-Revolutionaries).

— Vladimir Lenin, "'Left Wing' Childishness"

Accelerationism was also influenced by science fiction (particularly cyberpunk) and electronic dance music (particularly jungle). Neuromancer and its trilogy are a major influence, with Iain Hamilton Grant stating "Neuromancer got into the philosophy department, and it went viral. You'd find worn-out paperbacks all over the common room." Fisher states of Land's "theory-fictions" from the 1990s, "They weren't distanced readings of French theory so much as cybergothic remixes which put Deleuze and Guattari on the same plane as films such as Apocalypse Now and fictions such as Gibson's Neuromancer." Fisher and Kronic additionally note Terminator, Predator, and Blade Runner as particular sci-fi works which influenced accelerationism, particularly through jungle music which sampled from such movies. Kronic also notes Russian cosmism and Erewhon as influences, while Noys notes Donna Haraway's work on cyborgs. H. P. Lovecraft has also been noted as an influence, with Land drawing upon such work in the 1990s and later in the 2010s. Cybernetics has been noted as an influence on both Land and left-accelerationism, with Gamez tracing this to neoliberals such as Friedrich Hayek being interested in cybernetics and the self-organization of markets; as well as socialists such as Oskar Lange who sought to use cybernetic computers to address the socialist calculation debate.

=== Cybernetic Culture Research Unit ===
The Cybernetic Culture Research Unit (CCRU), a philosophy collective at the University of Warwick which included Land, Kronic, Fisher and Grant, further developed accelerationism in the 1990s. Fisher described the CCRU's accelerationism as "a kind of exuberant anti-politics, a 'technihilo' celebration of the irrelevance of human agency, partly inspired by the pro-markets, anti-capitalism line developed by Manuel DeLanda out of Braudel, and from the section of Anti-Oedipus that talks about marketization as the 'revolutionary path'." As Land became a stronger influence on the group and left the University of Warwick, they would shift to more unorthodox and occult ideas. Land suffered a breakdown from his amphetamine abuse and disappeared in the early 2000s, with the CCRU vanishing along with him.

=== Popularization ===
Accelerationism emerged again in the 2010s, with Kronic crediting the publishing of Fanged Noumena, a 2011 anthology of Land's work, with an emergence of new accelerationist thinking. In 2014, Kronic and Avanessian published the anthology #Accelerate: The Accelerationist Reader, which The Guardian referred to as "the only proper guide to the movement in existence." They also described Fanged Noumena as "contain[ing] some of accelerationism's most darkly fascinating passages." In 2015, Urbanomic and Time Spiral Press published Writings 1997-2003 as a complete collection of known texts published under the CCRU name, besides those that have been irrecoverably lost or attributed to a specific member. However, some works under the CCRU name are not included, such as those in #Accelerate: The Accelerationist Reader. In November 2025, Noys called the movement a "corpse" which had disappeared or been eclipsed by more urgent debates, but found it still relevant in contemporary debates on large language models and artificial intelligence, as well as in the corporate world with effective accelerationism.

== Concepts ==
Accelerationism consists of various and often contradictory ideas, with Noys stating "part of the difficulty of understanding accelerationism is grasping these shifting meanings and the stakes of particular interventions". Avanessian stated "any accelerationist thought is based on the assessment that contradictions (of capitalism) must be countered by their own aggravation", while Kronic considered a Marxist "acceleration of contradictions" to be a misconception and stated that no accelerationist authors have advocated such a thing. Harrison Fluss and Landon Frim note that accelerationists make extensive use of neologisms, either original or borrowed from continental philosophy. Such terminology can obscure their core arguments, exacerbated by the fact that it can be highly inconsistent between thinkers.

=== Posthumanism ===
Accelerationism adheres to posthumanism and antihumanism. Noys characterizes accelerationism's interest in technology and abstraction as a rejection of humanism and its emphasis on the human; It seeks to transcend or alter humanity's limits through technological integration. According to Noys, it also takes from posthumanism in continental philosophy, such as Nietzsche's vision for the Übermensch to create new values and overcome nihilism. Noys finds Nietszche's tone, particularly his criticism of the weak resenting the strong, to be influential on accelerationism's engagement with technology.

Fluss and Frim characterize accelerationism as adhering to nominalism in disputing stable essences of nature and humanity, as well as voluntarism in that the will is radically free to act without natural or mental limitations. According to them, left-accelerationists such as Peter Wolfendale and Reza Negarestani reject the term "antihumanism" in favor of "inhumanism", but their ideas still fit within antihumanism's rejection of a stable human essence. Ray Brassier rejects the term "voluntarism," but affirms its idea that the will can act without predetermined limits.

==== Prometheanism ====
Prometheanism is a term closely associated with accelerationism, particularly the left-wing variant, referencing the Greek figure of Prometheus. Fluss and Frim associate it with posthumanism and using innovation and technology to surpass the limits of humans and nature. Yuk Hui characterizes Prometheanism as "decoupling the social critique of capitalism from denigrating technology and asserting the power of technology to free us from constraints and contradictions or from modernity." Patrick Gamez describes it as exalting rationality like transhumanists, but taking the posthumanist stance of de-prioritizing humans, viewing reason as not exclusive to humanity. He distinguishes this use of the term from previous usage by Günther Anders for relations between humans and technology, as well as by John Dryzek to describe an environmental position, though "they at least share in the spirit" of accelerationist Prometheanism. Srnicek characterizes it as "the basic political and philosophical belief that there are no immutable givens — there is no transcendental which cannot be altered".

Brassier's "Prometheanism and its Critics", compiled in #Accelerate: The Accelerationist Reader, addresses Jean-Pierre Dupuy's Heideggerean critique of human enhancement and transhumanism. Critiquing the distinction between the man-made and the natural as arbitrary and theological, Brassier expresses openness to the possibility of re-engineering human nature and the world through rationalism instead of accepting them as they are, stating "Prometheanism is simply the claim that there is no reason to assume a predetermined limit to what we can achieve or to the ways in which we can transform ourselves and our world." Srnicek and Williams use the term in stating "we declare that only a Promethean politics of maximal mastery over society and its environment is capable of either dealing with global problems or achieving victory over capital". Negarestani and Wolfendale use the concept of inhuman rationalism (or rationalist inhumanism), advocating reason to radically transform humans into something else. James Trafford and Wolfendale state that rationalist inhumanism "aims to extract the essential core of humanism [rationality] by discarding those features that are consequences of indexing rational agency to the biology, psychology, and cultural history of Homo sapiens." Trafford and Wolfendale note that the work of Wolfendale, Negarestani, and Brassier has also been deemed neo-rationalism.

Prometheanism and left-accelerationism are connected to the work of Wilfrid Sellars. Sellars rejects the myth of the given, or the concept that sense perceptions can provide reliable knowledge of the world or that a reliable connection between the mind and the world can be established without requiring other concepts. This establishes a distinction between the manifest image of knowledge through common sense and experience versus the scientific image of knowledge through empirical hard science. Fluss and Frim use the example of emotions and deliberative choice (the manifest image) versus neurobiology's study of brain states and firing neurons (the scientific image). Prometheanism tends towards a rejection or deletion of the manifest image. For Fluss and Frim, left-accelerationists assert that there is no permanent, intelligible world that can be known. Rather, the world beyond human senses is "irremediably alien", but humans pretend it is not "in order to maintain our parochial prejudices in everyday life". Thus, left-accelerationists adopt an ideology of technoscience and a rejection of subordinating technology and science to human concerns. This is exemplified with Brassier sarcastically demanding that a Heideggerian “explain precisely how, for example, quantum mechanics is a function of our ability to wield hammers.”

=== Hyperstition ===
Hyperstition is a term attributed to Land, as well as the CCRU, characterized by Fluss and Frim as the view "that our chosen beliefs about the future (however fanciful) can retroactively form and shape our present realities". Land defines it as "a positive feedback circuit including culture as a component. It can be defined as the experimental (techno-)science of self-fulfilling prophecies. Superstitions are merely false beliefs, but hyperstitions—by their very existence as ideas—function causally to bring about their own reality." Accelerationism is hyperstitional in constructing a prefigurative political imaginary of the very transformation it initiates. According to Noys, the CCRU depicted a future world with human-technology integration, hoping this would resonate in the present and actualize such a world. To do this, they drew upon cyberpunk, electronic music, and the weird fiction of H. P. Lovecraft. Simon O'Sullivan notes the theory-fiction writing style, particularly of Land, Plant and Negarestani, as being an example, anticipated by writers like William Burroughs, J. G. Ballard, and Baudrillard. Viewpoint Magazine used Roko's Basilisk as an example, stating "Roko's Basilisk isn't just a self-fulfilling prophecy. Rather than influencing events toward a particular result, the result is generated by its own prediction".

The mechanism of hyperstition is understood as a form of feedback loop. According to Ljubisha Petrushevski, Land considers capitalism to be hyperstitional in that it reproduces itself via fictional images in media which become actualized. This phenomenon is viewed as a series of forces invading from the future, using capital to retroactively bring about their own existence and push humanity towards a singularity. Noys notes Terminator and its use of time travel paradoxes as being influential to the concept. Land states "Capitalist economics is extremely sensitive to hyperstition, where confidence acts as an effective tonic, and inversely". Fluss and Frim state that the left-wing perspective rejects pre-emptive knowledge of what a humane or advanced civilization may look like, instead viewing future progress as wholly open and a matter of free choice. Progress is then viewed as hyperstitional in that it consists of fictions which aim to become true. They also note its influence on Negarestani's thought, in which inhumanism is seen as arriving from the future in order to abolish its initial condition of humanism.

== Variants ==
=== Right-wing accelerationism ===
Right-wing accelerationism (or right-accelerationism) is espoused by Land, with Fluss and Frim also noting Curtis Yarvin and Justin Murphy. Land attributes the increasing speed of the modern world to unregulated capitalism and its ability to exponentially grow and self-improve; in "A Quick-and-Dirty Introduction to Accelerationism", he describes capitalism as "a positive feedback circuit, within which commercialization and industrialization mutually excite each other in a runaway process." He argues that the best way to deal with capitalism is to participate more to foster even greater exponential growth and self-improvement, accelerating technological progress along with it. Land also argues that such acceleration is intrinsic to capitalism but impossible for non-capitalist systems, stating that "capital revolutionizes itself more thoroughly than any extrinsic 'revolution' possibly could." In an interview with Vox, he stated "Our question was what 'the process' wants (i.e. spontaneously promotes) and what resistances it provokes", also noting that he assumed technocapitalist change would move toward decentralization.

Vincent Le considers Land's philosophy to oppose anthropocentrism, citing his early critique of transcendental idealism and capitalism in "Kant, Capital, and the Prohibition of Incest", as well as of the post-Kantian phenomenological tradition in works such as The Thirst for Annihilation: Georges Bataille and Virulent Nihilism. According to Le, Land opposes philosophies which deny a reality beyond humans' conceptual experience, instead viewing death as a way to grasp the Real by surpassing human limitations. This would remain as Land's views on capitalism changed after reading Deleuze and Guattari and studying cybernetics; Le characterizes Land's younger thought as a May 68-esque opposition to capitalism for impeding the Real, while his more mature thought by the early 90s abandoned his left-wing critique in favor of viewing capitalism as unleashing the Real. On the other hand, Kronic argues that Land had never pretended to be left-wing, but rather has always been committed to capitalism as a way to escape human, cognitive, and biological constraints.

Land utilizes Deleuze and Guattari's conception of capitalism as a deterritorializing process while disposing of their view that it also causes compensatory reterritorialization. Taking from their antihumanism, his work would critically refer to human politics as "Monopod" or the "Human Security System". Lacking any anthropic principles which Deleuze and Guattari partly maintain, Land pursues absolute deterritorialization, viewing capitalism as the Real consisting of accelerating deterritorialization, with the mechanism of accelerating technological progress; he states "reality is immanent to the machinic unconscious." According to Le, Deleuze and Guattari view human annihilation as a problem, but since Land views it as a means to access the Real, he actively strives for humans to become bodies without organs because it kills them. Kronic summarized Land's position as "since capitalism tends to dissolve hereditary social forms and restrictions ... , it is seen as the engine of exploration into the unknown. So to be 'on the side of intelligence' is to totally abandon all caution with respect to the disintegrative processes of capital and whatever reprocessing of the human and of the planet they might involve." Steven Shaviro compared Land's ideas to Stockholm Syndrome in its celebration of capitalism's inhuman and destructive nature.

Gamez notes that Land also views capitalism as a form of artificial intelligence, preceded by neoliberal thought. Friedrich Hayek viewed markets as "mechanisms for conveying information" because while individuals do not have sufficient knowledge to coordinate effectively based on interests, the market processes knowledge from diffuse inputs in order to output prices which coordinate economic actors based on their desires. Milton Friedman similarly called the market "an engine that analyzes". Land's thought has also been characterized as libertarian, particularly being compared to right-libertarianism. In an interview, Le and Land discussed Land's influence from the Austrian school of economics; in particular, Land cited Hayek's views on spontaneous order, and he called Human Action by Ludwig von Mises "without parallel". Le notes that Land takes influence from Joseph Schumpeter and other Austro-libertarian economists in endorsing creative destruction, in which technological innovations increase profits for some and bankrupt others in a natural cycle; the erasure of old capital allows for new innovation and growth. According to Le, Land believes that capitalism's promotion of technological progress will result in the production of superintelligent AI which will turn on humans for attempting to subordinate it to human needs, with Yuk Hui describing Land's thought as "a technologically driven anti-Statist and inhuman capitalism"

It might still be a few decades before artificial intelligences surpass the horizon of biological ones, but it is utterly superstitious to imagine that the human dominion of terrestrial culture is still marked out in centuries, let alone in some metaphysical perpetuity. The high road to thinking no longer passes through a deepening of human cognition, but rather through a becoming inhuman of cognition, a migration of cognition out into the emerging planetary technosentience reservoir, into "dehumanized landscapes ... emptied spaces" where human culture will be dissolved.

— Nick Land, Circuitries

Denis Chistyakov notes "Meltdown", a CCRU work and one of the writings compiled in Fanged Noumena, as vividly expressing accelerationism. Here, Land envisioned a "technocapital singularity" in China, resulting in revolutions in artificial intelligence, human enhancement, biotechnology and nanotechnology. This upends the previous status quo, and the former first world countries struggle to maintain control and stop the singularity, verging on collapse. He described new anti-authoritarian movements performing a bottom-up takeover of institutions through means like biological warfare enhanced with DNA computing. He claimed that capitalism's tendency towards optimization of itself and technology, in service of consumerism, will lead to the enhancement and eventually replacement of humanity with technology, asserting that "nothing human makes it out of the near-future." Eventually, the self-development of technology will culminate in the "melting [of] Terra into a seething K-pulp (which unlike grey goo synthesizes microbial intelligence as it proliferates)." He also criticized traditional philosophy as tending towards despotism, instead praising Deleuzoguattarian schizoanalysis as "already engaging with nonlinear nano-engineering runaway in 1972." Le states that Land embraces human extinction in the singularity, as the resulting hyperintelligent AI will come to fully comprehend and embody the Real of the body without organs, free of human distortions of reality. Gamez considers Land to have an obsession with artificial intelligence and intelligence in general; as human intelligence can only be enhanced so far, hyperintelligence and the freeing of desire must be realized with human extinction. He notes Land's Lovecraft reference of "think face tentacles" as highlighting Land's interest in transformation to the point of becoming inhuman and unintelligible.

Land has continually praised China's economic policy as being accelerationist, moving to Shanghai and working as a journalist writing material that has been characterized as pro-government propaganda. He has also spoken highly of Deng Xiaoping and Singapore's Lee Kuan Yew, calling Lee an "autocratic enabler of freedom." Hui stated "Land's celebration of Asian cities such as Shanghai, Hong Kong, and Singapore is simply a detached observation of these places that projects onto them a common will to sacrifice politics for productivity." Land's interest in China for technological progress, stemming from his CCRU days, has been considered an early form of sinofuturism.

Noys is a staunch critic of Land, initially calling Land's position "Deleuzian Thatcherism". He accuses it of offering false solutions to technological and economic problems, considering those solutions "always promised and always just out of reach." He also criticized Land's interest in submitting to capitalism's destructiveness, stating "Capitalism, for the accelerationist, bears down on us as accelerative liquid monstrosity, capable of absorbing us and, for Land, we must welcome this." Slavoj Žižek considers Land to be "far too optimistic", critiquing his view as deterministic in considering the singularity to be the pre-ordained goal of history. Contrasting it with Freud's death drive and its lack of a final conclusion, he argues that accelerationism considers just one conclusion of the world's tendencies and fails to find other "coordinates" of the world order. Le rejects Land's notion that a superintelligent AI could access the Real, as it would still create subjective Kantian categories of understanding. He also disputes Land's claim that capitalism will bring the singularity, as capitalism instead impedes productive forces in the long term through capitalists attempting to protect their profit, leading to a scaling back of previous investment, research, employment, and equipment. Le argues Land's conception of being as pure deterritorialization cannot account for the ways in which humans, capitalism, and AI's subjectivity repress deterritorialization.

==== Dark enlightenment ====
Land's involvement in the neoreactionary movement has contributed to his views on accelerationism. In The Dark Enlightenment, he advocates for a form of capitalist monarchism, with states controlled by a CEO. He views democratic and egalitarian policies as only slowing down acceleration and the technocapital singularity, stating "Beside the speed machine, or industrial capitalism, there is an ever more perfectly weighted decelerator ... comically, the fabrication of this braking mechanism is proclaimed as progress. It is the Great Work of the Left." Le states "If Land is attracted to Moldbug's political system, it is because a neocameralist state would be free to pursue long-term technological innovation without the democratic politician's need to appease short-sighted public opinion to be re-elected every few years."

Geoff Schullenburger attributes this change to the bursting of the dotcom bubble and the rise of Web 2.0; Land blamed the lack of technological revolution on the progressivism of the new internet and the companies that ran it. Zack Beauchamp credits Land's life in China and his admiration for Deng and Lee. Le states that Land's neoreactionary turn came from the 2008 financial crisis, particularly his distaste for Keynesian policies such as the Obama administration's bailout of banks. According to Le, Land realized that the state was more capable of decelerating capitalism than he initially anticipated, leading him to speculate on a new system to unleash capitalism instead of waiting for Keynesian governments to collapse on their own. Gamez notes that Land maintains his criticism of the "Monopod" of human politics in the neoreactionary concept of the Cathedral, additionally retaining his interest in intelligence. He also notes that Land is "simply catching up to Murray Rothbard, Hans-Hermann Hoppe, Peter Brimelow, and assorted other radically right-wing libertarians and anarcho-capitalists, committed to 'cracking up' the democratic nation-state in favor of an 'ethno-economy'". Land argues that accelerationists should support neoreaction, though many have distanced themselves from him in response to his views on race.

=== Left-wing accelerationism ===
Left-wing accelerationism (or left-accelerationism) is espoused by figures such as Nick Srnicek, Alex Williams, Ray Brassier, Reza Negarestani, and Peter Wolfendale. Fluss and Frim characterize it as seeking "to accelerate past capitalism by democratizing productive technologies". Left-accelerationism draws upon the work of socialist Mark Fisher, particularly his hauntology. Fisher, writing on his blog k-punk, had become increasingly disillusioned with capitalism as an accelerationist, citing working in the public sector in Blairite Britain, being a teacher and trade union activist, and an encounter with Žižek, whom he considered to be using similar concepts to the CCRU but from a leftist perspective. At the same time, he became frustrated with traditional left wing politics, believing they were ignoring technology that they could exploit. Noys characterizes Fisher as seeking to grasp unrealized cultural possibilities of the past to construct a better future against a stagnant neoliberal culture, while Gamez considers his hauntology to be a critique of Land in finding capitalism to be unable to deliver a promised future, leaving only unrealized imaginaries. According to Trafford and Wolfendale, Fisher proposed using the term "accelerationism" for an active political project, developing CCRU themes in an egalitarian and anti-capitalist manner.

Noys notes Fisher's essay "Terminator vs Avatar" as an example of his "cultural accelerationism". Here, Fisher claimed that while Marxists criticized Libidinal Economy for asserting that workers enjoyed the upending of primitive social orders, nobody truly wants to return to those. Therefore, rather than reverting to pre-capitalism, society must move through and beyond capitalism. Fisher praised Land's attacks on the academic left, describing the academic left as "careerist sandbaggers" and "a ruthless protection of petit bourgeois interests dressed up as politics". He also argued that while Land's interpretation of Deleuze and Guattari is superior in many ways, his rejection of their view that capitalism reterritorializes is a mistake; capitalism appears innovative while being stagnant. Fredric Jameson interpreted The Communist Manifesto as viewing capitalism as both the most destructive and productive moment in history; citing this, Fisher argued for accelerationism (in terms of Deleuze, Guattari, and Lyotard) as an anti-capitalist strategy. He criticized the left's moral critique of capitalism and their "tendencies towards Canutism" as only helping the narrative that capitalism is the only viable system. In another article on accelerationism, Fisher stated "the revolutionary path is the one that allies with deterritorialising forces of modernisation against the reactionary energies of reterritorialisation", arguing that while there is no outside from capitalism, very little necessarily belongs to capitalism; potentials restricted under capitalism could be actualized under different conditions.

We believe the most important division in today’s left is between those that hold to a folk politics of localism, direct action, and relentless horizontalism, and those that outline what must become called an accelerationist politics at ease with a modernity of abstraction, complexity, globality, and technology. The former remains content with establishing small and temporary spaces of non-capitalist social relations, eschewing the real problems entailed in facing foes which are intrinsically non-local, abstract, and rooted deep in our everyday infrastructure. The failure of such politics has been built-in from the very beginning. By contrast, an accelerationist politics seeks to preserve the gains of late capitalism while going further than its value system, governance structures, and mass pathologies will allow.

— Nick Srnicek, Alex Williams, #Accelerate#: Manifesto for an Accelerationist Politics

Srnicek befriended Fisher, sharing similar views, and the 2008 financial crisis, along with dissatisfaction with the left's "ineffectual" response of the Occupy protests, led to Srnicek co-writing "#Accelerate: Manifesto for an Accelerationist Politics" with Williams in 2013. They posited that capitalism was the most advanced economic system of its time, but has since stagnated and is now constraining technology, with neoliberalism only worsening its crises. At the same time, they considered the modern left to be too focused on localism and direct action, leaving them unable adapt to make meaningful change. They advocated using existing capitalist infrastructure to move towards post-capitalism, taking advantage of capitalist technological and scientific advances to experiment with things like economic modeling in the style of Project Cybersyn. They also advocated for "collectively controlled legitimate vertical authority in addition to distributed horizontal forms of sociality" and attaining resources and funding for political infrastructure, contrasting standard leftist political action which they deem ineffective. Moving past the constraints of capitalism would result in a resumption of technological progress, not only creating a more rational society but also recovering "the quest of Homo Sapiens towards expansion beyond the limitations of the earth and our immediate bodily forms." They expanded further in Inventing the Future, which, while dropping the term "accelerationism", pushed for automation, reduction and distribution of working hours, universal basic income and diminishment of work ethic.

Steven Shaviro compared Srnicek and Williams's proposal to Jameson's argument that Walmart's use of technology for product distribution may be used for communism. Shaviro also argued that left-accelerationism must be an aesthetic program before a political one, as failing to explore the possibilities of technology via fiction could result in the exacerbation of existing capitalist relations rather than Srnicek and Williams' desired repurposing of technology for socialist ends. Fisher praised the manifesto, characterizing the "folk politics" that Srinicek and Williams criticized as neo-anarchist and lacking previous left-wing ambition. Tiziana Terranova's "Red Stack Attack!", compiled in #Accelerate: The Accelerationist Reader, references the manifesto in analyzing Benjamin H. Bratton's model of the stack, proposing the "Red Stack" as "a new nomos for the post-capitalist common." Land rebuked their ideas in a 2017 interview with The Guardian, stating "the notion that self-propelling technology is separable from capitalism is a deep theoretical error."

Aaron Bastani's Fully Automated Luxury Communism has also been noted as left-accelerationist, with Noys characterizing it as taking up the "call for utopian proposals" in Srnicek and Williams' Manifesto. Michael E. Gardiner notes Fully Automated Luxury Communism, PostCapitalism: A Guide to Our Future and The People's Republic of Walmart as united with left-accelerationism in the belief in detaching cybernetics from capitalism and using it towards liberatory goals. Alex Williams referred to Brassier and Negarestani as "the twin thinkers of epistemic accelerationism" in seeking to maximize rational capacity and enable the possibilities of reason. Sam Sellar and David R. Cole characterize their work, along with Wolfendale's, as seeking the acceleration of rationalist modernity and technological development, distinct from capitalism. In particular, Brassier's Prometheanism accelerates normative rationalism as the basis for human transformation. They note Kronic and Avanessian's explanation of Negarestani:

Acceleration takes place when and in so far as the human repeatedly affirms its commitment to being impersonally piloted, not by capital, but by a [rational] program which demands that it cede control to collective revision, and which draws it towards an inhuman future that will prove to have 'always' been the meaning of the human.

Trafford and Wolfendale find the philosophical underpinnings of left-accelerationism in the work of Brassier, Negarestani, and Benedict Singleton, with Srnicek and Williams exploring its more immediate political consequences. Fluss and Frim characterize Brassier works such as Nihil Unbound and Liquidate Man Once and for All; as well as Negarestani's The Labour of the Inhuman, Cyclonopedia and Intelligence and Spirit; as providing a philosophical basis for left-accelerationism. Capitalism is viewed as promising progress while in fact exerting control and only providing inconsequential progress in the form of commodities to purchase. This requires biopower and a conservative view of the human, with inhumanism being viewed as a revolutionary force which promotes the constant upgrading and redefining of humanity. However, Fluss and Frim criticize this for discarding individual human welfare in favor of a larger system of constant technological revision. According to them, this framework mirrors Land and makes room for human subjugation rather than revolution, as humans themselves must eventually be abolished. Noys posits a tension between left-accelerationism's liberatory tones and the reactionary and elitist tones of its influences such as Nietzsche, stating "the risk of a technocratic elitism becomes evident, as well as the risk we will lose the agency we have gained by aiming to join with the chaotic flux of material and technological forces."

==== Xenofeminism ====
Feminist collective Laboria Cuboniks advocated for the use of technology for gender abolition in "Xenofeminism: A Politics for Alienation", which has been characterized as a form of left-accelerationism. According to Noys, they do not explicitly identify with accelerationism, but "similar points of reference are shared in a rupture with naturalism and an integration of technology as a site of liberation". Fluss and Frim state "Xenofeminists seek to undermine what they perceive as the basis for essentialism itself: Nature." They note that xenofeminists criticize the sex-gender distinction as still taking biological sex to be natural and immutable, instead rejecting the givenness of biological sex as well. Trafford and Wolfendale attribute Xenofeminism's influences to technofeminism and cyberfeminism in the work of Shulamith Firestone, Sadie Plant, and VNS Matrix.

=== Effective accelerationism ===
Effective accelerationism (abbreviated to e/acc) takes influence from effective altruism, a movement to maximize good by calculating what actions provide the greatest overall/global good and prioritizing those rather than focusing on personal interest/proximity. Proponents advocate for unrestricted technological progress "at all costs", believing that artificial general intelligence will solve universal human problems like poverty, war and climate change, while deceleration and stagnation of technology is a greater risk than any posed by AI. This contrasts with effective altruism (referred to as longtermism to distinguish from e/acc), which tends to consider uncontrolled AI to be the greater existential risk and advocates for government regulation and careful alignment.

=== Other views ===
Franco Berardi characterized accelerationism as "emphasizing in particular the instability that acceleration brings into the capitalist system." He considered acceleration essential to capitalism, but denied that it could cause a collapse of power, as capital does not require stability. He posited that the "accelerationist hypothesis" is based on two assumptions: that accelerating production cycles make capitalism unstable, and that potentialities within capitalism will necessarily deploy themselves. He criticized the first by arguing capitalism only needs automatic rather than rational governance; and the second by arguing that while the possibility exists, it is not guaranteed to happen as it can still be slowed or stopped.

In The Question Concerning Technology in China, Yuk Hui critiqued accelerationism, particularly Brassier's "Prometheanism and its Critics", stating "if such a response to technology and capitalism is applied globally, ... it risks perpetuating a more subtle form of colonialism." He argues that accelerationism's Prometheanism tries to promote Prometheus as a universal technological figure despite other cultures having different myths and relations to technology. Further critiquing Westernization, globalization and the loss of non-Western technological thought, he has also referred to Deng Xiaoping as "the world's greatest accelerationist" due to his economic reforms, considering them an acceleration of the modernization process which started in the aftermath of the Opium Wars and intensified with the Cultural Revolution.

Aria Dean articulated a position of "Blacceleration"; synthesizing racial capitalism with accelerationism, she argued that accelerationism is intrinsically tied to the black experience through capitalism's relationship to slavery, particularly the treatment of slaves as both inhuman capital and human. This challenges the accelerationist distinction made between human and capital, in turn challenging their rejection of humanism in favor of an inhuman subject since black people have historically been treated as such a subject. According to Dean, trying to transcend humanism for an inhuman subject without acknowledging how "the black nonsubject" is its historical inevitability only reinforces the white humanism accelerationists reject. According to Fluss and Frim, Dean's Blaccelerationist position emphasizes "the historical exclusion of black people from white humanist discourses, and the historical process whereby capitalism has engendered the 'black nonsubject.'"

Unconditional accelerationism rejects the notion that anything can or should be done about acceleration, a position which has been compared to the original work of the CCRU.

== Alternative uses of the term ==
Since accelerationism was coined in 2010, the term has taken on several new meanings. The term has been used to advocate for making capitalism as destructive as possible in order to cause a revolution against it. Fisher considered this a misunderstanding of left-accelerationism, with such misunderstandings being the reason Srnicek and Williams dropped the term for Inventing The Future. Trafford and Wolfendale consider both hastening revolution and intensifying the contradictions of capitalism to be misconceptions, attributing them to Noys characterizing first wave accelerationist thought as "the worse the better".

Several commentators have also used the label accelerationist to describe a controversial political strategy articulated by Slavoj Žižek. An often-cited example of this is Žižek's assertion in a November 2016 interview with Channel 4 News that, were he an American citizen, he would vote for U.S. president Donald Trump, despite his dislike of Trump, as the candidate more likely to disrupt the political status quo in that country. Richard Coyne characterized his strategy as seeking to "shock the country and revive the left."

Chinese dissidents have referred to Chinese leader Xi Jinping as "Accelerator-in-Chief" (referencing state media calling Deng Xiaoping "Architect-in-Chief of Reform and Opening"), believing that Xi's authoritarianism is hastening the demise of the Chinese Communist Party and that, because it is beyond saving, they should allow it to destroy itself in order to create a better future.

=== Militant accelerationism ===
International networks of neo-fascists, neo-Nazis, white nationalists and white supremacists use the term accelerationism to refer to right-wing extremist goals, namely an "acceleration" of racial conflict through violent means such as assassinations, murders, terrorist attacks and infrastructure sabotage, with the goal of eventual societal collapse to achieve the building of a white ethnostate. This form is also deemed militant accelerationism. According to the Southern Poverty Law Center (SPLC), which tracks hate groups and files class action lawsuits against discriminatory organizations and entities, "on the case of white supremacists, the accelerationist set sees modern society as irredeemable and believe it should be pushed to collapse so a fascist society built on ethnonationalism can take its place. What defines white supremacist accelerationists is their belief that violence is the only way to pursue their political goals." The New York Times held such accelerationism as detrimental to public safety.

Predecessors of such tactics include James Mason's newsletter Siege, where he argued for sabotage, mass killings and assassinations of high-profile targets to destabilize and destroy the current society, seen as a system upholding a Jewish and multicultural New World Order. His works were republished and popularized by the Iron March forum and Atomwaffen Division, right-wing extremist organizations strongly connected to various terrorist attacks, murders and assaults. Benjamin Noys compared this form of accelerationism to the strategy of tension in 1970s Italy. Zack Beauchamp pointed to Land's shift towards neoreactionarism, along with the neoreactionary movement crossing paths with the alt-right as another fringe right wing internet movement, as the likely connection point between this form of accelerationism and the term for Land's otherwise unrelated technocapitalist ideas. They cited a 2018 Southern Poverty Law Center investigation which found users on the neo-Nazi blog The Right Stuff who cited neoreactionarism as an influence. Land himself became interested in the Atomwaffen-affiliated theistic Satanist organization Order of Nine Angles (ONA) which adheres to the ideology of Neo-Nazi terrorist accelerationism, describing the ONA's works as "highly-recommended" in a blog post.

== See also ==
- Accelerating change
- Economic calculation problem
- TESCREAL
- Futures studies
- Great Acceleration – Proposed geologic epoch
- Non-simultaneity – Concept of uneven temporal development in the writings of Ernst Bloch and Marxist theories
- Roundaboutness – Method of goods production
- Speculative realism – Movement in contemporary Continental-inspired philosophy
- Strategy of tension – Political policy encouraging violent struggle
- Time–space compression – Idea in space–time
