= Fanged Noumena =

2011 anthology by Nick Land

Fanged Noumena: Collected Writings 1987–2007
- Cover of the first edition
- Editor: Maya B. Kronic and Ray Brassier
- Author: Nick Land
- Cover artist: Jake and Dinos Chapman
- Language: English
- Subject: Acceleration; nihilism; cybernetics; continental philosophy; theory-fiction; mathematics
- Published: 2011; 2012; 2014; 2018
- Publisher: Urbanomic / Sequence Press; MIT Press
- Publication place: United Kingdom
- Pages: 666
- ISBN: 978-0-9553087-8-9
- Preceded by: The Thirst for Annihilation

Fanged Noumena: Collected Writings 1987–2007 is a 2011 anthology of writings by English philosopher Nick Land, edited by Maya B. Kronic (formerly Robin Mackay) and Ray Brassier. It was first published by Urbanomic—founded by Kronic prior—with Sequence Press and later republished by the MIT Press.

The anthology collects essays and texts, initially published and previously unpublished, spanning various philosophical and aesthetic interests—as well as unorthodox writing styles that have been dubbed "theory-fictions"—explored and utilized by Land over the titular time period. The book has obtained a cult following and has subsequently been credited with influencing the rise in popularity of accelerationism.

== Summary ==
When I contacted Land about the republication of his works, he did not protest, but had nothing to add: It's another life; I have nothing to say about it—I don’t even remember writing half of those things … I don't want to get into retrospectively condemning my ancient work—I think it's best to gently back off. It belongs in the clawed embrace of the undead amphetamine god.

— Maya B. Kronic, "Nick Land: An Experiment in Inhumanism", 2013

As an anthology primarily aiming to cohere Nick Land's conjunctional reinterpretation of continental philosophy and modernist poetry in the 1990s—what British writer Kodwo Eshun described as a dramatization of "theory as a geopolitico-historical epic"—and his subsequent "theory-fictions" which explored cyberpunk media, Gothic themes and esoteric systems while utilizing unorthodox and disordered experimental writing styles, Fanged Noumena consists of essays and prose texts written by Land during multiple periods, compiled by Michael Carr, Mark Fisher, David Rylance and Reza Negarestani, with their sequence being edited by Kronic and Brassier.

The sequence begins during his time as a lecturer for the Department of Philosophy of the University of Warwick, England from 1987 until his resignation from his academic post in 1998, progressing onto his contributions to the mythopoeia of "hyperstitions" of the Cybernetic Culture Research Unit (CCRU) as it was maintained within the university, and concluding with blog posts written between 2004 and 2007 in his residency in Shanghai, China.

The progression displayed in Land's work, according to Kronic and Brassier, is essential to the presentation of the book as a response to "an incapacity to believe that Land actually meant what he said—[his] writing was indeed nothing but a machine for intensification", and that rhetorically, "if this volume infects a new generation, already enlivened by a new wave of thinkers who are partly engaging the re-emerging legacy of Nick Land's work—it will have fulfilled its purpose."

Kronic and Brassier noted that the emergence of accelerationism in Land's work is marked by the idea that philosophically, "it is no longer a matter of 'thinking about', but rather of observing an effective, alien intelligence in the process of making itself real, [and is] a matter of participating in such a way as to continually intensify and accelerate this process." In a lecture for a conference on accelerationism given in 2010, Brassier referred to Land's philosophical project as "mad black Deleuzianism", (Note: This term was also used in the blurb on the inside cover of Fanged Noumena by Mackay and Brassier.) referencing a criticism given by French philosopher Vincent Descombes of the work of Deleuze and Guattari and Jean-François Lyotard as "mad black Hegelianism".

The term denotes the anti-vitalism of Land's reinterpretation of Deleuze's philosophy, distinguished by its "unsavory" orientation towards the paradox of "will[ing] the impossibility of willing" and an active materialist interest ("no longer a pretext for critique but a vector of exploration") in, according to Kronic and Brassier, "the impersonal and anonymous chaos of absolute time".

These themes are consistent in the writings featured in Fanged Noumena, with a turn in the 1990s towards "the 'inconceivable alienations' outputted by the monstrous machine-organism built by capital" according to Kronic and Armen Avanessian, and a further turn into the 2000s towards "ever more abstract planes of an alien Outside's absolute deterritorialisation of reason and sense", according to Vincent Le.

=== Late 1980s—early 1990s ===
The sequence of Fanged Noumena begins with "Kant, Capital, and the Prohibition of Incest: A Polemical Introduction to the Configuration of Philosophy and Modernity", initially published for Third Text in 1988. Land has since retroactively dismissed the essay for its inaccuracies. "Narcissism and Dispersion in Heidegger's 1953 Trakl Interpretation", initially published in 1990, analyzes what Land identifies as Heidegger's suppression of the effectivity of the Dionysian tropes in Trakl's poetry, which Kronic and Brassier identified as Land's "mounting impatience" with Heideggerian philosophy, leading to a resolution of the "exit problem" where "the manner in which the (failed) insurrectionary attempts at 'escape' made by artists each open up the prospect of [a] heterogeneous space that subverts order"

This concept is explored further in the subsequent literary criticism essays "Art as Insurrection: the Question of Aesthetics in Kant, Schopenhauer, and Nietzsche", "Spirit and Teeth" and "Shamanic Nietzsche", which were published prior to and following the 1992 publication of The Thirst for Annihilation: Georges Bataille and Virulent Nihilism (An Essay in Atheistic Religion), Land's student thesis for the University of Warwick.

Prior to these, "Delighted to Death" extends from his research conducted for The Thirst for Annihilation, identifying regulatory and repressive principles of Christian morality in Kant's ethical system, and elements of martyrdom in the experience of the sublime. On the contrary, Land also focuses on the history of the concept of genius as an "a contingent, impersonal creative force" according to Kronic and Brassier, a theme which reappears in the aforementioned essays. McKenzie Wark characterizes this essay as focusing on the appearance of "a priori forms as constants for novel experiences" in Land's topics. The 1993 essay "After the Law" also extends from Land's then-present philosophical research, analyzing the Apology of Socrates and Bataille's political anti-philosophy to focus on exceptions to the moral law that similarly creatively escape judgment.

"Making it with Death: Remarks on Thanatos and Desiring-Production" marks Land's first thorough engagement with the theory of Deleuze and Guattari, including the formative proto-accelerationist speculations made in Anti-Oedipus and especially their practice of schizoanalysis (also referred to by Land as "stratoanalysis"), while also further developing a philosophical history of Deleuzian difference and the body without organs that had previously been articulated in the conclusion of "Art as Insurrection"; Kronic and Brassier summarized this development as Land's assertion—rejecting Deleuze and Guattari's disavowal of Freudian drive theory—that "all temporary [existential] obstacles are dispensable coagulants inhibiting death's unwinding." Land also referred to this philosophical interest during this period as "libidinal materialism".

Responding to the assertions made in the essay, Brassier theorized that while if "schizoanalytical practice is fuelled by the need to always intensify and deterritorialize, there comes a point at which there is no agency left: you yourself have been dissolved back into the process", the difficulties appearing in Land's initial approach could be amended by further deviations by future subjects. Kronic and Avanessian described the 1992 essay "Circuitries"—which incorporates abstract and impersonal prose—as observing "a darkness" descending "over the festive atmosphere of desiring-production envisaged by" post-structuralists associated with accelerationism; whereas these prior thinkers envisioned "the transfer of all motive force from human subjects to capital as the inauguration of an aleatory drift", Land hails accelerationism as instead "gleefully explor[ing] what is escaping from human civilization", with emphasis on the deregulation of "runaway" processes.

The essay links the concepts present in the influence of Antonin Artaud's experimental writing on Deleuze and Guattari, especially with regards to the body without organs and Artaud's "antihumanism", to the principles of cybernetic science and thermodynamics. "Machinic Desire", initially published in 1993, continues this interest while displaying "popular investment in dystopian cyberpunk SF, including William Gibson's Neuromancer trilogy and the Terminator, Predator and Bladerunner movies"; Land began, from this essay onward, to redefine cyberpunk as a "textual machine for affecting reality by intensifying the anticipation of its future", incorporating its dynamic concepts of posthuman progress into his re-envisioning of philosophy.

Land uses four feminine figures, which he sees as agents for accelerating the transcendental critique of both anthropocentrism and phallocentrism: the slave turned lesbian; the sister; the sexborg; and the Sphinx.

=== Mid-1990s ===
"CyberGothic" is the first published text by Land to extensively use multiple contemporary cultural reference points that would become fixtures in his work, including postmodern literature and its authors' concepts, especially Gibson's 1984 cyberpunk novel Neuromancer and the concept of cyberspace, as well as digital financial speculation, emerging forms of complex electronic dance music such as jungle music and drum and bass, and cyberdelic hacker culture. Alongside a reinterpretation of Neuromancer and its concept of cyberspace as "K-space"—an amoral model of immanent existential interactions "that melds gleaming abstraction[s] to eldritch portent[s]"—in relation to the Deleuzian body without organs, Land proposes a "cybergothic" model of a philosophy of death that Kronic and Brassier noted resulted from Land finding parallels between his own preceding developments and Gibson's novel, culminating in his philosophical identification of the novel's character Wintermute as "a new type of intelligence: aggressively exploratory, incommensurable with human subjectivity and untethered from social reproduction."

"K-space" was the first concept of Land's to use the "K-" prefix, a shorthand for "cyber(netic)", with his concept of "K-war" guiding his later abstract prose texts; Kronic and Brassier clarified that this shift in Land's focus expresses that "the insurrectionary basis of revolution now lies at the virtual terminus of capital—the future as transcendental unconscious, its 'return' inhibited by the repressed [alternate] circuits of temporality", concerned more with intensity and spontaneous intensive spaces than with ideal orders, at a point of "increasingly autonomous technics' pursuit of their own self-replication without any interest in serving human use-value" according to Le.

The dialogue "Cyberrevolution", initially published in the first issue of Kronic's journal ***Collapse, features a scenario where figures speaking on a fictional dystopian news broadcast attempt to understand the cause of mass riots in multiple continents, before escalating into a passionate argument over the relevance of critical theory to the situation. It serves as a hyperstitional explanation of the failure for acceleration to be commonly understood. Meanwhile, the abstract prose texts "Hypervirus" and "No Future" utilize themes of virality and depersonalization alongside Land's interest in runaway processes to create the effect of what Kronic and Brassier described as "full-blown delirium".

Alongside the stylistic influence of Gibson's novels, in these texts, "Land's anti-humanist speculation is combined with an evident enjoyment of wordplay and a renewed appreciation for the anthropological, mythological and psychoanalytical sources of Capitalism and Schizophrenia", according to Kronic. The unpublished conference paper "Cyberspace Anarchitecture as Jungle-War" contains these elements in addition to a clearer focus on the cultural relevance of the complexity of jungle music inspired by Kodwo Eshun's concurrent writings and lectures, and the potential for a "K-insurgency".

The literary criticism essay "Meat (or How to Kill Oedipus in Cyberspace)", extending from this concept, uses a comparative speculation made by William S. Burroughs between the Kurtz of Joseph Conrad's 1899 novella Heart of Darkness and the Colonel Kurtz of Francis Ford Coppola's 1979 film quasi-adaptation Apocalypse Now as a starting point for a reinterpretation of Deleuze and Guattari's use of anthropology. It uses the distinction between the cyberpunk concepts of cyberspace and meatspace to suggest that as the processes of civilization and globalization continue, uncivilized and primitive social elements reemerge and are absorbed in a process of deterritorialization.

==== "Meltdown" ====
"Meltdown" was published as the opening essay in the first issue of the CCRU's magazine Abstract Culture in 1995; Kronic proclaimed that it was an "invocation of apocalyptic planetary techno-singularity", while she and Brassier summarized the text as making the "claim—both apocalyptic and performative as hype—that the compression-phases of modernity, beginning the final phase of their acceleration in the sixteenth century with Protestant revolt, oceanic navigation, commoditisation and its attendant (place-value) numeracy, constitute a 'cyberpositive' global circuit of interexcitement".

The essay uses multiple reference points to convey an ongoing history of acceleration, including European history, Don DeLillo's 1985 novel White Noise, sociology and nanotechnology research, and a refracted, strongly terminological writing style. A full-length music video tape was created for "Meltdown" by London art audiovisual collective Orphan Drift, featuring cyberdelic visuals, an ambient techno soundtrack and the text being read by processed Apple MacinTalk text-to-speech voices.

=== Late 1990s—late 2000s ===
From the point of Land's de facto leadership of the CCRU onward, he "disintegrated into the number-names of a hyperpagan pantheon, syncretically drawing on the occult, nursery rhyme, anthropology, SF and Lovecraft, among other sources", according to Kronic and Brassier. With the collective, he began to develop the Numogram, a hyperstitional occult system of demonic interactions and invocations, serving as the model for the process of what the collective identified as "cultural production". In addition to this development, Land began utilizing experimental writing styles and diagrammatic forms of presentation, with his creativity increasingly drawing from his use of stimulants, especially amphetamines.

"A zIIgºthIc–==X=cºDA==–(CººkIng–lºbsteRs–wIth–jAke–AnD–DInºs)" is an abstract prose text incorporating themes of the Oedipus complex that utilizes superscript symbols that was written for a 1996 exhibition of art by British visual artists Jake and Dinos Chapman. A later artwork by them is featured on the cover of Fanged Noumena. "KataςoniX" is an invocatory text intended to be read aloud that was written for a multimedia presentation by ***Collapse and Orphan Drift at Virtual Futures '96, which was presented at the University of Warwick. It incorporates quotations of glossolalia from the notebooks of Antonin Artaud, combining nondescript phrases and occult descriptions with "sub-linguistic clickings and hissings".

The first text in the selection of Land's CCRU texts in Fanged Noumena, "Barker Speaks: The CCRU Interview with Professor D.C. Barker", is a fictional interview conducted between the collective and the titular character—an author surrogate for Land—whose study of "geotraumatics" and "tic-systems" extends from his appropriation of cosmic pessimistic speculations made by Deleuze and Guattari in Capitalism and Schizophrenia, as well as previously by Freud in Beyond the Pleasure Principle; Wark identified Land's preceding interest in positive feedback loops and autopoietic patterns as an influence on the concept of geotrauma.

"Mechanomics", published in 1998, is a paper on "schizonumerics" detailing speculations on the anthropological history of numeracy, prevalent logocentric attitudes to numbering, the Deleuzoguattarian interpretation of numbers as multiplicity, and Land's own reinterpretation of set theory and combinatorics where the mathematical proofs of Georg Cantor and Kurt Gödel "open up humans to an outside of logos" in which notions of quantity proceed past limits of comprehensibility: "for Land", according to Kronic and Brassier, "the interest of Gödel's achievement is not primarily 'mathematical' but rather belongs to a lineage of the operationalisation of number in coding systems that will pass through Turing and into the technological mega-complex of contemporary techno-capital."

"Cryptolith" is a narrative text written by Land as part of the CCRU in collaboration with Orphan Drift, extending the character of Professor Barker and the concept of tic-systems. "Non-Standard Numeracies: Nomad Cultures" is an arrangement of fragmentary invocatory texts, similar to "KataςoniX", where Land's concept of geotraumatics and his mythological research presented elsewhere in the writings of the CCRU are both used to convey the Outside breaking into human conventions.

"Occultures", a set of cybergothic narrative texts that explore the past and present hyperstitional subcultures and in-universe characters of the CCRU, was later featured on the "Syzygy" section of the CCRU website. "Origins of the Cthulhu Club" is another selection of Land's collaborative writing within the CCRU, featuring a fictional correspondence extending off of Lovecraft's Cthulhu Mythos.

In 2004, "Introduction to Qwernomics" was published online on Land's first blog, Hyperstition. It explores the occult and logical implications made by the specific setups of typographic systems, especially in consumer technology, and their application for "the qabbalistic tracking of pure coding 'coincidences'." Similarly, "Qabbala 101" is an essay written for the first volume of Collapse, Kronic's reboot of her earlier journal of the same name, exploring the history of kabbalah, the logic of its cosmogony and the further occult and mathematical implications of its numeracy.

"Tic Talk", "Critique of Transcendental Miserablism" and "A Dirty Joke" were published on Hyperstition. The first text is a schizonumeric conclusion to the character story of Professor Barker wherein every number is written as its factors. The second is an accelerationist polemic that explores a wide variety of sources to propose a fatalistic model of capitalist society. The third is an autobiographical text written as a confession of both the "failure" of Land's experimental career and the success of its longevity beyond his work. The anthology concludes with several pages of schizonumeric, typographic and geotraumatic diagrams from Land's notebooks, dated between the 1990s and 2000s.

== Reception ==
In a 2014 review of Fanged Noumena for the Religious Studies Review journal, Jeremy Biles called the book "a bevy of aggressively strange, virulently antihumanistic essays engaging issues including postmodern capitalism, cybernetic culture, madness, monotheism, and law", saying that "this book will intoxicate." In a 2017 retrospective article written for The Guardian on the CCRU, Andy Beckett referred to Fanged Noumena as a text "which contains some of accelerationism's most darkly fascinating passages."

Eugene Brennan referred to the book as a collection which "show[s] Nick Land's waning interest in Bataille, turning increasingly to the more libertarian thought of Deleuze and Guattari to develop his accelerationist philosophy", clarifying that much of the early work in the book extended from The Thirst for Annihilation.

== See also ==
- Jean Baudrillard
- Emil Cioran
- Arthur Kroker
- Libidinal Economy
- Limit-experience
- Carlo Michelstaedter
- Nietzschean décadence
- Serial Experiments Lain
- Will to power
