= Cybernetic Culture Research Unit =

Experimental cultural theorist collective

The Cybernetic Culture Research Unit (CCRU, sometimes typeset Ccru) was an experimental cultural theorist collective formed in late 1995 at Warwick University, England which gradually separated from academia until it dissolved in the early 2000s. It garnered reputation for its idiosyncratic and surreal "theory-fiction" which incorporated philosophy, cyberpunk, and occultism, and its work has since had an online cult following related to the rise in popularity of accelerationism. The CCRU are strongly associated with their former leading members, Sadie Plant, Mark Fisher and Nick Land.

Established at the University of Warwick philosophy department, the group listed their interests as "cinema, complexity, currencies, dance music, e-cash, encryption, feminism, fiction, images, inorganic life, jungle, markets, matrices, microbiotics, multimedia, networks, numbers, perception, replication, sex, simulation, sound, telecommunications, textiles, texts, trade, video, virtuality, war". Iain Hamilton Grant notes Neuromancer as particularly influential to the group's formation. Jungle music was a crucial part of the CCRU, with Fisher stating the "CCRU was trying to do with writing what Jungle, with its samples from such as [sic] Predator, Terminator and Blade Runner, was doing in sound: 'text at sample velocity', as Kodwo Eshun put it."

In addition to building off of Gilles Deleuze and Félix Guattari's Anti-Oedipus and A Thousand Plateaus, to which references can be found in the CCRU's writings, the collective variously drew from writers including H. P. Lovecraft, William Gibson, J. G. Ballard, Friedrich Nietzsche, Octavia Butler, William S. Burroughs and Carl Jung. Fisher described the CCRU's work as "a kind of exuberant anti-politics, a ‘technihilo' celebration of the irrelevance of human agency, partly inspired by the pro-markets, anti-capitalism line developed by Manuel DeLanda out of Braudel, and from the section of Anti-Oedipus that talks about marketization as the 'revolutionary path.'" The CCRU's work is considered to be a precursor to sinofuturism due to their interest in China as an ideal society for accelerationism, with Scottish electronic musician and CCRU member Kode9 having coined the term "sinofuturism". Their later work drew upon occultism, esotericism, numerology, and the work of Lovecraft and Aleister Crowley. Roc Jiménez de Cisneros considers the CCRU's work to be influential on the development of speculative realism, while Fisher considered speculative realism to be returning to the CCRU's areas of interest in 2010.

The Numogram: A time-map diagram from the CCRU mythos

One of the CCRU's predominant ideas is hyperstition, which Nick Land referred to as "the experimental (techno-)science of self-fulfilling prophecies" where, by means of esoteric cybernetic principles, certain ideas and beliefs that are initially incomprehensible (akin to superstitions) can covertly circulate through reality and establish cultural feedback loops that then drastically meld society, which they also referred to in total as "cultural production". The CCRU's esoteric numerological cybernetic system for comprehending hyperstition, the Numogram, often appears in their writings alongside its circulatory zones and their respective demons.

== History ==
=== 1993–1996 ===
Theorist and researcher Sadie Plant, working in the University of Warwick, formed the collective around 1993–1994 as a cyberfeminist research group which initially only involved itself in studies and did not publish texts. Eventually, as she left her academic post, students and philosopher Nick Land who had at the time recently published his monograph The Thirst for Annihilation became the driving force in determining its methods and ideas. Other major contributors included Kodwo Eshun, Iain Hamilton Grant and Stephen Metcalf, as well as other colleagues whose research were inspired by emerging nihilist, psychoanalytic and materialist theory.

The connections made leading up to the formation of the CCRU and during its tenure eventually lead to the Virtual Futures conferences. The conferences, organised from 1994 to 1996, were initially founded by Joan Broadhurst, Dan O’Hara, Otto Imken, Eric Cassidy, and postgraduate students under the aegis of the Warwick Centre for Research in Philosophy and Literature.

Stephen Metcalf was a central player in the CCRU's creation. His essay "Autogeddon" is included in the 1998 Virtual Futures book published by Routledge, and in 1996, Metcalf translated, edited and published a collection of texts by Friedrich Nietzsche, Hammer of the Gods: Apocalyptic Texts for the Criminally Insane, that reflected and influenced how Nietzsche was being read by those who formed the CCRU at the time.

=== 1997–2000s ===
The CCRU drastically took on new forms and became increasingly experimental under the direction of Land; it was not a sanctioned academic project. According to Robin Mackay, by around 1998, "the CCRU became quasi-cultish, quasi-religious". Mackay mentions having "left before it descended into sheer madness", with Iain Hamilton Grant asserting that the later excesses drove several members into mental breakdown. The collective became increasingly unorthodox in its work, with its output including writing, performance events, music and collaborative art, and exploring post-structuralism, cybernetics, science fiction, rave culture, and occult studies. The CCRU's written output was largely self-published in zines such as ***collapse and Abstract Culture, and many of these writings are maintained online on the website for the CCRU.

Land's antisocial behavior, reliance on amphetamines, and increasingly experimental writing at this time led academics and contemporaries to distance themselves from him until he eventually left his academic post. As a consequence, the CCRU could no longer use space at or claim affiliation with Warwick University. The CCRU continued to operate from a flat in Leamington Spa up until Land suffered a breakdown and disappeared from public view in the early 2000s, with the CCRU vanishing along with him. Fisher stated of the group's existence, "it was never formally disbanded but then again it was never formally constituted."

== Members and affiliates ==
Following the departure of Plant, whereupon the University of Warwick began to deny any relationship to the group, some of the CCRU's members have had an ongoing subcultural impact.

Those who were affiliated with the CCRU during and after its time as part of the University of Warwick Philosophy department include philosophers Stephen Metcalf, Iain Hamilton Grant, Ray Brassier and Reza Negarestani; cultural theorists Mark Fisher and Kodwo Eshun; publisher and philosopher Maya B. Kronic; digital media theorists Luciana Parisi and Matthew Fuller; electronic music artist and Hyperdub label head Steve Goodman, a.k.a. Kode9; writer and theorist Anna Greenspan; sound theorist Angus Carlyle; novelist Hari Kunzru; and artists Jake and Dinos Chapman, among others.

Land and the CCRU collaborated frequently with the experimental art collective 0[rphan]d[rift>] (Maggie Roberts and Ranu Mukherjee), notably on Syzygy, a month-long multidisciplinary residency at Beaconsfield Contemporary Art gallery in South London, 1999, and on 0[rphan]d[rift>]'s Cyberpositive (London: Cabinet, 1995), a set of texts which demonstrated the CCRU's approaches.

== Legacy ==
The CCRU played an instrumental role in the development of accelerationism. Mackay credits the publishing of Fanged Noumena, a 2011 anthology of Land's work, with an emergence of new accelerationist thinking.

In 2014, Urbanomic published #Accelerate: The Accelerationist Reader, which anthologized works related to the accelerationist movement, including some by former CCRU members and two written under the CCRU name. In 2015, Urbanomic and Time Spiral Press published Writings 1997-2003 as a complete collection of known texts published under the CCRU name, besides those that have been irrecoverably lost or attributed to a specific member. However, some works under the CCRU name are not included, such as those in #Accelerate: The Accelerationist Reader.

American electronic musician Oneohtrix Point Never credited the CCRU's writings as an influence on his 2018 song "Black Snow" from his album Age Of.

== See also ==
- Alternate history
- Alternate reality game
- Cyberdelic
- Serial Experiments Lain
- Theosophy
- Theosophy and literature
