= Armen Avanessian =

Austrian writer

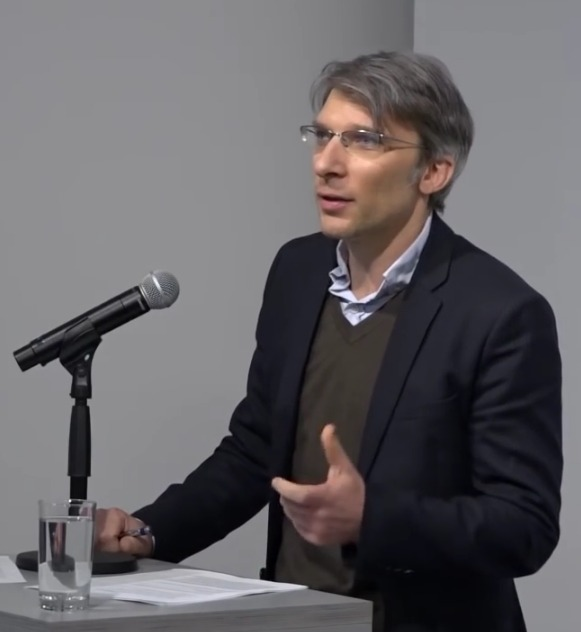
Armen Avanessian speaks at "Images of Surveillance" at the Goethe Institut New York in 2016.

Armen Avanessian (*1973 in Vienna) is an Austrian philosopher, literary theorist, and political theorist. He has taught at the Free University of Berlin, among other institutions, and held fellowships in the German departments of Columbia University and Yale University. His work on Speculative realism and Accelerationism in art and philosophy has found a wide audience beyond academia.

== Life ==
Of Armenian descent, born 1973 in Vienna, Armen Avanessian studied philosophy and political science under Jacques Rancière in Paris. He completed his dissertation, 'Phenomenology of Ironic Spirit: Ethics, Poetics, and Politics in Modernity', under the supervision of conservative theorist Karl Heinz Bohrer at Bielefeld University in 2004. For several years, he worked as a free-lance journalist, journal editor (Le Philosophoire, Paris), and in the publishing industry in London.

Avanessian's work has come to be situated primarily outside the academy. It includes widely discussed statements on current affairs such as the refugee crisis, numerous lectures in the international art and culture scene, as well as a large number of interviews and intellectual portraits. Beyond the classical academic mainstream, Avanessian has repeatedly managed to introduce new concepts and theoretical constellations into public discourse. These consist partly of neologisms, partly of concepts used in smaller circles, which Avanessian's work as editor re-produces for the German-language context. Examples include "speculative realism", "acceleration", "xenofeminism", "hyperstition", and, most recently, the concept of the "time complex: postcontemporary". Hyperstition, moreover, is not just another concept, it also designates a method, namely the actualization in the present, from out of the future, of ideas or fictions.

== Career ==
Following his dissertation, which had already explored phenomena at the intersection of art, politics, and philosophy, Avanessian focused on developing a new approach in literary theory and philosophy of language. Collaborating with colleagues such as Anke Hennig, he began working in 2011 on connecting new speculative-ontological approaches with twentieth-century philosophies of language, which resulted most notably in two co-written books, 'Present Tense: A Poetics' (2012, English translation 2015) and 'Metanoia: A Speculative Ontology of Language, Thinking, and the Brain' (2014, English translation forthcoming 2016). Moreover, he played a central role in bringing accelerationism into German-language political philosophy. In 2015, Wired Magazine named him an intellectual innovator, noting in particular his concern with post-capitalist ideas.

From 2007 to 2014, he taught in the Peter Szondi Institute for Comparative Literature at the Free University of Berlin. In 2011 he was a Visiting Fellow in the German Department at Columbia University and in 2012 in the German Department at Yale University. Since 2013, he has held visiting appointments at a number of art schools (in Nuremberg, Vienna, Basel, Copenhagen, California). In 2014, he became the chief editor at Merve Verlag, a Berlin publisher specializing in philosophy and political theory. In 2011, Armen Avanessian founded the bilingual research and publication platform Speculative Poetics that brings together philosophers, writers, and artists from across the world around the idea of a new theoretical discipline in the making.

From 2018 to 2021 Avanessian was Philosopher-in-Residence, at V-A-C Foundation in Moscow; in 2019 he was a fellow at Thomas Mann House in Pacific Palisades, Los Angeles; from 2020 to 2021 he was a visiting professor at the Academy of Fine Arts Hamburg.

In 2021 Avanessian joined the Department of Cultural and Communication Studies at Zeppelin University in Friedrichshafen on Lake Constance as Chair of Media Theory.

Avanessian's books have been translated into several languages, including English, Russian, Dutch, Spanish, and French.

== Literary Studies ==
Avanessian's early publications are mostly scholarly books and essays on linguistics, semantics, and literary studies. His philosophical breakthrough came with the edited volumes on 'Speculative Realism' (Realism Now) and the German edition of the reader, '#Acceleration'. His move to Merve has emphasized his focus on editing current, not yet established philosophy, treating, in particular, questions in feminism, finance theory, and technology. He has also published books discussing the possibility of poeticizing philosophy.

His book 'Overwrite: Ethics of Knowledge, Poetics of Existence' (2015; English translation 2017) confronts the deplorable state of academia in an explicitly accelerationist way. Not limiting himself to mere criticism, Avanessian is constantly at work constructing alternative platforms such as the summer school he organized with Reza Negarestani and Pete Wolfendale at the Haus der Kulturen der Welt, Berlin, on "Emancipation as Navigation: From the Space of Reasons to the Space of Freedoms."

== Art ==
Avanessian can also be considered a postcontemporary artist. He uses not only classical publication formats but also art festivals and exhibitions. The 2015 gallery festival "Tomorrow Today / curated by_vienna" for example, was based on Avanessian's homonymous essay and combined the work of twenty curators with the idea of an actual post-capitalism. Within the framework of the ninth Berlin Biennale, Avanessian conducted a ten-day Young Curators Workshop on alternatives to the economic and political models of contemporary art.

Avanessian is a regular contributor to art journals such as Spike, Texte zur Kunst, and DIS Magazine. He also writes frequently about art in philosophical contexts. For several years now, Avanessian has collaborated with the graphic artist, Andreas Töpfer, which has led to publications in print (with Merve and Sternberg Press) and on film.

== Radio ==
With columnist Georg Diez, media theorist Paul Feigelfeld, and author Julia Zange, Armen Avanessian hosts "60 Hertz", a talk show airing every Monday on Berlin Community Radio. The show is conceived as an artistic rendering, in interviews and conversations, of everyday life in the 2010s. Episodes are usually broadcast in a mix of English and German language.

== Film ==
With Berlin director Christopher Roth, he has produced the film Hyperstition (2016), which draws on ontology, science fiction, and sociology to question the concept of time. Screened at several festivals in Europe and the United States, the film consists of conversations with established as well as younger philosophers such as Nick Srnicek, Elie Ayache, Ray Brassier and others.

== Selected bibliography ==
=== Writer ===
- Phänomenologie ironischen Geistes – Ethik, Poetik und Politik der Moderne. Wilhelm Fink Verlag, 2010. ISBN 978-3-7705-4266-6
- with Anke Henning: Präsens – Poetik eines Tempus. Diaphanes, 2012, ISBN 978-3-03734-223-7
  - Present Tense. A Poetics. (together with Anke Hennig), Bloomsbury 2015
- with Anke Hennig: Metanoia – Spekulative Ontologie der Sprache. Merve Verlag, 2014, ISBN 978-3-88396-351-8
  - Metanoia: Ontologie der Sprache. (together with Anke Hennig) Berlin: Merve, 2014
  - Metanoia: a speculative ontology of language, thinking, and the brain

(together with Anke Hennig). Transl. by Nils F. Schott. Bloomsbury academic, London, 2019. ISBN 978-1-35000-473-3

- with Andreas Töpfer: Speculative Drawing, Sternberg Press, 2014, ISBN 978-3-95679-044-7
  - Speculative Drawing. (together with Andreas Töpfer) Berlin: Sternberg Press, 2014
- Überschrift: Ethik des Wissens – Poetik der Existenz. Merve Verlag, 2014. ISBN 978-3-88396-365-5
  - Overwrite: ethics of knowledge – poetics of existence. Transl. by Nils F. Schott. Berlin: Sternberg Press, 2017 ISBN 978-3-95679-114-7
- Irony and the Logic of Modernity. De Gruyter, 2015. ISBN 978-3-11-030220-2
  - Irony and the Logic of Modernity. DeGruyter, 2015
- Metaphysik zur Zeit. Berlin: Merve Verlag, 2018
  - Future metaphysics. Transl. by James C. Wagner. Cambridge, UK: Polity Press, 2020. ISBN 978-1-5095-3796-9
- Planeten Denken: Hyper-Antizipation und biografische Tiefenzeit. (with Daniel Falb). Berlin: Merve 2024
- Planetarische Ethik: Tractatus Ethico-Planetarius. Berlin: Merve Verlag, 2025. ISBN 978-3-88396-365-5

=== Publisher ===
- Armen Avanessian, Luke Skrebowski: Aesthetics and Contemporary Art. Sternberg Press, 2011, ISBN 978-1-934105-52-8
- Armen Avanessian, Björn Quiring and Andreas Töpfer: Abyssus Intellectualis. Spekulativer Horror. Merve, 2013, ISBN 978-3-88396-342-6
- Armen Avanessian : Form – Zwischen Ästhetik und künstlerischer Praxis. diaphanes, ISBN 978-3-03734-294-7
- Armen Avanessian, Gabriele Brandstetter and Franck Hofmann : Die Erfahrung des Orpheus. Wilhelm Fink Verlag, 2010,ISBN 978-3-7705-4927-6
- Armen Avanessian, Franck Hofmann : Raum in den Künsten : Konstruktion – Bewegung – Politik. Wilhelm Fink Verlag, 2010, ISBN 978-3-7705-4658-9
- Armen Avanessian, Winfried Menninghaus and Jan Völker : Vita aesthetica – Szenarien ästhetischer Lebendigkeit. diaphanes, ISBN 978-3-03734-075-2
- Armen Avanessian : #Akzeleration. Merve Verlag, 2013, ISBN 978-3-88396-350-1
- Armen Avanessian, Jan Niklas Howe : Poetik – Historische Narrative, aktuelle Positionen. Kulturverlag Kadmos, 2014, ISBN 978-3-86599-226-0
- Armen Avanessian, Robin Mackay : #Accelerate – The Accelerationist Reader. Merve Verlag, 2014, ISBN 978-0-9575295-5-7
- Armen Avanessian, Anke Hennig and Steffen Popp : Poesie und Begriff, diaphanes. ISBN 978-3-03734-709-6
- Armen Avanessian, Sophie Wennerscheid : Kierkegaard and Political Theory – Religion, Aesthetics, Politics and the Intervention of the Single Individual. Museum Tusculanum Press, 2015, ISBN 978-87-635-4154-1
- Armen Avanessian, Helen Hester and Jennifer Sophia Theodor (Translation): dea ex machina. Merve Verlag, 2015, ISBN 978-3-88396-369-3
- Armen Avanessian, Gerald Nestler : Making of Finance. 2015, ISBN 978-3-88396-374-7
