= Sinofuturism =

Perception of China as futuristic

Sinofuturism is the concept that China is the foundation for a technologically advanced future, challenging Western hegemony. Originating as a Western phenomenon, Chinese thinkers and artists have made use of Western concerns over China's potential hegemony, as well as Orientalist stereotypes, to explore technology's relationship with Chinese society and its people via art, science fiction, and philosophy.

== Background ==
A precursor to sinofuturism is the work of Nick Land and the Cybernetic Culture Research Unit (CCRU), key figures in accelerationism. While the term had not been coined yet, they considered China to be "the greatest political engine of social and economic development the world has ever known" in its fusion of Marxism and capitalism, exemplified in descriptions such as Land's "Neo-China arrives from the future". Land eventually moved to China, with McKenzie Wark noting Land's guidebook The Shanghai World Expo Guide 2010 as containing a "condensed vision" of sinofuturism. Virginia L. Conn also considers sinofuturism to be the natural descendant of visual art forms such as lianhuanhua in envisioning deterministic post-scarcity utopias while calling readers to action in order to realize this vision. Both also functioned to enroll their audience in a national development project, teaching them how to ensure the future that was depicted.

The term itself originated in an essay by Scottish electronic musician and CCRU member Kode9, titled "Fei ch’ien rinse out: Sino-futurist under-currency". It was then popularized by Lawrence Lek in his video essay Sinofuturism (1839—2046 AD), with Lek expanding upon its themes in Geomancer and AIDOL.

== Overview ==
As of 2025, Sinofuturism is primarily an external discourse about China, rather than a discourse within China.

Conn notes that Sinofuturism is based on three main concepts: imagining China as an alternative to the West, considering a "Chinese future" to be inevitable, and re-visualizing the past and present in relation to the future yet to come. It stems from various assertions that "China is the future", in contrast to the long-standing dominance of the West and, in particular, the United States. Conn distinguishes Sinofuturism from other ethnic futurisms (i.e. afrofuturism, Gulf futurism) in that the concept is applied to its subject (the people) rather than developed from it, though she notes that Chinese authors and artists have begun to use it for their own ends. Holger Briel notes that the external application provides a risk that the label may be co-optable, but points out that the term "afrofuturism" had also been created outside of the movement by Mark Dery. Conn also distinguishes sinofuturism in that, rather than seeking to escape hegemonic colonial portrayals of the future, "sinofuturism's primary proponents see in China the culmination of Western capitalism’s accelerated end."

Sinofuturism draws upon Orientalist tropes which typically consider an irreconcilable difference to exist between the West and the East. Conn considers Lek's use of techno-Orientalist tropes, such as the perception that China is "exotic, bizarre, tacky, and cheap", to be a kind of satire "that 'takes back' the stereotypes of the techno-Asian future" in order to visualize the relationship to such a different entity. Lek embraces seven key stereotypes (computing, copying, gaming, studying, addiction, labor, and gambling) in order to use outsiders' view of China to envision a Chinese future. Sinofuturism explores Chinese technologies such as the internet, surveillance technology, population control, artificial intelligence, and robot workers. It also utilizes Western media notions of China's repression and censorship in its depictions. Shanghai in particular is considered an exemplary model for sinofuturism, with Gabriele de Seta additionally noting Shenzhen and Chongqing. Conn distinguishes this from the perception of a high-tech Japan in cyberpunk and noir fiction in that it paints Chinese individuals as faceless resources rather than innovators of cultural and technological capital. de Seta argues that sinofuturism utilizes an Orientalist "denial of coevalness" in which the subjects of anthropology are viewed as being in a different, non-present time period (previously the past) from the Western observer.

Lek's video essay Sinofuturism (1839—2046 AD) consists of overlapping audio and visuals which draw from both Chinese tradition and modern society. These not only serve to connect themes in China's past and future, but they also exemplify the difference and irreconcilability of different paradigms, traditions, perspectives, value-systems, and cultures. Lek describes sinofuturism as "a science fiction that already exists" and as an artificial intelligence. Carlos Henrique and Carvalho Souza consider Land's view of sinofuturism to be an expression of his concept of hyperstition, in which the future is viewed as retroactively shaping the past and present through fiction and belief. Dino Ge Zhang explores the undesirableness, hopelessness, and accommodation of outcasts constituting China's urban-rural fringe and cities such as Wuhan as a potential sinofuture and "the immiscible condition of a sinofuture itself". Zhang uses the term "no-futurity", which Briel connects to "no-future" in 1970's UK punk rock as a contrast to more optimistic proposals for sinofuturism.

Sinofuturism has been characterized as a reaction to the decline of the Western world. Yuk Hui considers sinofuturism to be a model for the Dark Enlightenment movement which results from this perceived decline. According to Hui, political fatigue leads people such as Land to look towards Asian cities such as Shanghai, Hong Kong, and Singapore as examples of "depoliticized techno-commercial utopia". China is viewed as smoothly importing Western science and technology while Western innovation is constantly limited by the progressivism of the Cathedral. Hui considers this a product of failed universalization in terms of globalization. He believes that the unilateral Westernization which characterized globalization has reversed, leading to a concern that the West cannot maintain its dominance; he states "Today, when Shanghai is no cheaper than New York and when Trump accuses China of stealing jobs and destroying the US economy, the story is over." Likewise, Zhang argues that English-language sinofuturism is a reaction to a decline of the West rather than an exploration of the future rooted in the Chinese condition for its own sake. Conn states that most Western sinofuturism is shaped by non-Chinese writers grappling with the potential loss of Western hegemony. She notes the British anticipatory sinofuturism of the CCRU as seeing the rise of China as a threat to the hegemonic status of the former British Empire.

=== Science fiction ===
Sinofuturism is associated with a resurgence of Chinese science fiction. The genre had been suppressed by the Chinese Communist Party due to the perception that it obscured the clear path to the future. As such, Chinese science fiction writers had to find alternative means of publishing their work before the CCP relaxed their restrictions. Briel credits Liu Cixin with "a veritable explosion" of science fiction texts and films in China, with the industry reporting 82.96 billion RMB in revenue in 2021. Briel also notes Ken Liu, "who single-handedly made Chinese SF popular in the West with his many translations of key texts", along with coining the subgenre of silkpunk. Conn notes Xia Jia, who described Chinese sci-fi as having the mission of educating Western readers, with Conn interpreting this as showing the still-present imbalance of global power. Works such as Chen Qiufan's The Waste Tide and Ma Boyong's City of Silence explore the negative Western perceptions of a Chinese future, such as environmental disaster and censorship respectively. In August 2020, the China National Film Administration and China Association for Science and Technology issued a document titled “Some Opinions on Promoting the Development of Science Fiction Films”, which aimed to promote Chinese sci-fi both internally and abroad. Conn notes that there was some contention in the potential that sci-fi films would not be traditionally Chinese enough for Chinese people, nor American enough for Americans.

=== Philosophy ===
Yuk Hui's concept of cosmotechnics is considered to engage with sinofuturism. He rejects European views of technics explored by philosophers such as Martin Heidegger, particularly the view that there is a singular concept of technology that can be deduced from all cultures. Hui aims to construct a Chinese philosophy of technology, citing thinkers such as Keiji Nishitani and Mou Zongsan as showing the gap between Eastern and Western metaphysics. Hui counters the Western Promethean view of techne, typically considered universal, with the lack of a rebellion against the gods in the Chinese tradition. As such, he considers accelerationist Prometheanism to risk "perpetuating a more subtle form of colonialism" if applied globally.
