= Maya B. Kronic =

English cultural theorist

Philosophical work
- Era: 21st-century philosophy
- Region: Western philosophy
- Website: readthis.wtf

Maya B. Kronic, formerly Robin Mackay, is a philosopher and translator whose work focuses on accelerationism, technology, and contemporary speculative philosophy.

== Career ==
Since 2009, Kronic has been the editor and publisher of Urbanomic, a publishing house of contemporary western object oriented philosophy. In 2006, Kronic founded Collapse, an independent, non-affiliated magazine of philosophical research and development.

Kronic was a member of the short-lived research program Cybernetic Culture Research Unit (C.C.R.U) until 1998.

Kronic is known for being the translator in English of the French philosopher Alain Badiou. Other translations include work by Éric Alliez. More controversially, they are the publisher of Nick Land's anthology Fanged Noumena edited together with the philosopher Ray Brassier.

In 2024, Kronic published Cute Accelerationism with Amy Ireland. Kronic is also the author of By The North Sea.
