= Hyperstition =

Idea that makes itself real through its own existence

A hyperstition is a self-fulfilling idea that becomes real through its own existence. The price of Bitcoin, Roko's Basilisk, accelerationism, and the QAnon conspiracy theory have all been described as hyperstitions. Self-fulfilling prophecies are a kind of hyperstition where predictions are made about the future that become true by being known. The concept was coined by Nick Land in 1995 as a portmanteau of hyper- and superstition, during his time at the Cybernetic Culture Research Unit developing the philosophy of accelerationism.

== Origins ==
The Cybernetic Culture Research Unit was formed in late 1995, and played a prominent role in developing of the philosophy of accelerationism and hyperstition It was initially described by Nick Land in a 1995 issue of Catacomic as being an "element of effective culture that makes itself real, through fictional qualities functional as a time-travelling device". Land wrote that hyperstition operated as a "coincidence intensifier, effecting call to the Old Ones", referring to the omniscient deities from the Lovecraftian Cthulhu Mythos.

While developing their theory of accelerationism, CCRU members (especially Nick Land and Reza Negarestani) wrote in a theory-fiction writing style that depicted images of a future integrated human-technology world in order to resonate with people in the present and try to cause the realization of those ideas.

== Characterizations ==
Land characterized hyperstitions as "a positive feedback circuit including culture as a component. It can be defined as the experimental (techno-)science of self-fulfilling prophecies. Superstitions are merely false beliefs, but hyperstitions—by their very existence as ideas—function causally to bring about their own reality." Hyperstitions have been characterized by Harrison Fluss and Landon Frim as the view "that our chosen beliefs about the future (however fanciful) can retroactively form and shape our present realities". Benjamin Noys has noted Terminator and its use of time travel paradoxes as being influential to the concept.

The mechanism of hyperstitions have been characterized as a form of feedback loop. Fluss and Frim state that the left-wing perspective rejects pre-emptive knowledge of what a humane or advanced civilization may look like, instead viewing future progress as wholly open and a matter of free choice. Progress is then viewed as hyperstitional in that it consists of fictions which aim to become true. They also note its influence on Negarestani's thought, in which inhumanism is seen as arriving from the future in order to abolish its initial condition of humanism.

== See also ==
- Thomas theorem
