= Nick Land =

English philosopher

- Land in 2025
- Born: 1962 (age 63–64); Sutton Coldfield, Warwickshire, England

Education
- Education: University of Essex (PhD, 1987)
- Doctoral advisor: David Farrell Krell

Philosophical work
- Era: Contemporary philosophy
- Region: Western philosophy
- School: Continental philosophy Accelerationism; Dark Enlightenment
- Institutions: University of Warwick
- Main interests: Nihilism; materialism; cybernetics; antihumanism; cyberpunk; horror
- Notable ideas: Hyperstition

Nick Land (born 1962) is an English philosopher best known for popularising the ideology of accelerationism. His work has been tied to the development of speculative realism, and departs from the formal conventions of academic writing, incorporating unorthodox and esoteric influences. Much of his writing was anthologized in the 2011 collection Fanged Noumena.

In the 1990s, Land was closely affiliated with the Cybernetic Culture Research Unit (CCRU), a "theory-fiction" collective co-founded by Land and cyberfeminist philosopher Sadie Plant at the University of Warwick. During this era, Land drew inspiration from post-structuralist theory and leftist thinkers like Georges Bataille, Karl Marx, and Deleuze & Guattari as well as science fiction, rave culture, and the occult. He also coined the term hyperstition to refer to memetic ideas that bring about their own reality.

Land resigned from Warwick in 1998. After a period of amphetamine abuse, he suffered a breakdown in the early 2000s and disappeared from public view. Later, he moved to Shanghai and re-emerged as a figure on the political right, becoming a foundational thinker in the reactionary movement known as the Dark Enlightenment. His related writings have explored anti-egalitarian and anti-democratic ideas.

== Biography ==
Land obtained a PhD in 1987 in the University of Essex under David Farrell Krell, with a thesis on Heidegger's 1953 essay Die Sprache im Gedicht (Language in the Poem), which is about Georg Trakl's work. He began as a lecturer in continental philosophy at the University of Warwick from 1987 until his resignation in 1998. In 1992, he published The Thirst for Annihilation: Georges Bataille and Virulent Nihilism. Land published an abundance of shorter texts, many in the 1990s during his time with the CCRU. Most of these articles are compiled in the retrospective collection Fanged Noumena, published in 2011.

At Warwick, Land and Sadie Plant co-founded the Cybernetic Culture Research Unit (CCRU), an interdisciplinary research group described by philosopher Graham Harman as "a diverse group of thinkers who experimented in conceptual production by welding together a wide variety of sources: futurism, technoscience, philosophy, mysticism, numerology, complexity theory, and science fiction, among others". During his time at Warwick, Land participated in Virtual Futures, a series of cyber-culture conferences. Virtual Futures 96 was advertised as "an anti-disciplinary event" and "a conference in the post-humanities". One session involved Land "lying on the ground, croaking into a mic", recalls Maya B. Kronic, while Kronic played jungle records in the background. He was also the thesis advisor of some PhD students. After he resigned, the CCRU continued meeting under his leadership. In the early 2000s, Land suffered a breakdown after a period of "fanatical" amphetamine abuse, disappearing from public.

Land taught at the New Centre for Research & Practice until March 2017, when the Centre ended its relationship with him "following several tweets by Land this year in which he espoused intolerant opinions about Muslims and immigrants". As of 2017, Land resided in Shanghai. During the COVID-19 pandemic, he experienced Shanghai's strict lockdown measures firsthand. After Xenosystems, his primary blog, was removed from the internet in 2022, he took a hiatus from social media before returning later that year. In October 2023, he launched a new social media account, Xenocosmography, marking a shift toward religious and numerological themes.

In February 2026, Land met Curtis Yarvin for the first time in San Francisco.

== Concepts ==
Vincent Le defines Land's work in general, from his time at Warwick to the 2000s, by its critique of anthropocentrism, particularly in Immanuel Kant's transcendental idealism and its denial of a reality beyond human comprehension. Land's work has been influential to the political philosophy of accelerationism; Land views capitalism as the driver of modernity and deterritorialization, advocating its use to dissolve existing social systems and reach a technological singularity. Along with the other members of CCRU, Land wove together ideas from the occult, cybernetics, science fiction, and poststructuralist philosophy to try to describe the phenomena of technocapitalist acceleration. His work would also incorporate what Le called "numbering practices", drawing upon mathematical concepts such as Cantor's set theory and Gödel's incompleteness theorems; as well as incorporating Kabbalah and numerology. Land coined the term hyperstition, a portmanteau of hyper and superstition, to describe something "equipoised between fiction and technology". According to Land, hyperstitions are ideas that, by their very existence as ideas, bring about their own reality.

Land later contributed to the Dark Enlightenment—also known as the neo-reactionary movement (NRx)—which opposes egalitarianism and democracy. According to reporter Dylan Matthews, Land believes democracy restricts accountability and freedom. His Dark Enlightenment work also contributes to his accelerationism; he views democratic and egalitarian policies as only delaying acceleration and the technocapital singularity. Thus, he prefers capitalist monarchies to pursue long-term technological progress, as he believes democracy focuses on short-term public interests. Shuja Haider notes, "His sequence of essays setting out its principles [has] become the foundation of the NRx canon." His writing has also discussed themes of scientific racism and eugenics, or what he has called "hyper-racism". Since 2016, he has increasingly been recognised as an inspiration for the alt-right. Land disputes that the NRx movement is a movement, and defines the alt-right as distinct from the NRx. Around this time, Land would also turn to writing abstract horror novellas, drawing upon writers such as H. P. Lovecraft as a vehicle for his philosophical critique of anthropocentrism.

== Reception and influence ==
Mark Fisher, a British cultural theorist and student of Land's, argued in 2011 that Land's greatest impact had been on music and art rather than philosophy. The musician Kode9, the artist Jake Chapman, and others have studied with or been influenced by Land, with Chapman highlighting Land's "technihilism". Fisher underscores in particular how Land's personality during the 1990s could catalyze changes in those engaging with his work through what Kodwo Eshun called a manner "immediately open, egalitarian, and absolutely unaffected by academic protocol" that could dramatise "theory as a geopolitico-historical epic". Fisher has also written that "Land was our Nietzsche" in baiting progressive tendencies, mixing the reactionary and futuristic, and his writing style. He also praised Land's attacks on left-wing academia while taking issue with his interpretation of Deleuze and Guattari's views on capitalism.

Nihilist philosopher Ray Brassier, also formerly from the University of Warwick, said in 2017, "Land has gone from arguing 'Politics is dead', 20 years ago, to this completely old-fashioned, standard reactionary stuff." Land has been noted as an influence on speculative realism, having taught Brassier and Iain Hamilton Grant as well as influencing associated figures such as Maya B. Kronic and Reza Negarestani. Graham Harman also cited Land as the first philosopher in recent times to seriously engage with Lovecraft, leading Vincent Le to call Land "not so much a thinker of the speculative turn as he is its chief forerunner".

== Books ==
- Heidegger's 'Die Sprache im Gedicht' and the Cultivation of the Grapheme (PhD Thesis, University of Essex, 1987). Textual transcription.
- The Thirst For Annihilation: Georges Bataille and Virulent Nihilism (An Essay in Atheistic Religion) (London and New York: Routledge, 1992).
- Machinic Postmodernism: Complexity, Technics and Regulation (with Keith Ansell-Pearson & Joseph A. McCahery) (SAGE Publications, 1996)
- The Shanghai World Expo Guide 2010 (China Intercontinental Press, 2010).
- Shanghai Basics (China Intercontinental Press, 2010).
- Land, Nick (2011). Kronic, Maya; Brassier, Ray (eds.). Fanged Noumena: Collected Writings 1987-2007. London: Urbanomic. ISBN 978-0955308789.
- Calendric Dominion (Urbanatomy Electronic, 2013).
- Suspended Animation (Urbanatomy Electronic, 2013).
- Fission (Urbanomic, 2014).
- Templexity: Disordered Loops through Shanghai Time (Urbanatomy Electronic, 2014).
- Phyl-Undhu: Abstract Horror, Exterminator (Time Spiral Press, 2014).
- Shanghai Times (Urbanatomy Electronic, 2014) ASIN B00IGKZPBA.
- Dragon Tales: Glimpses of Chinese Culture (Urbanatomy Electronic, 2014) ASIN B00JNDHBGQ.
- Xinjiang Horizons (Urbanatomy Electronic, 2014) ASIN B00JNDHDVY.
- Chasm (Time Spiral Press, 2015) ASIN B019HBZ2Q4.
- The Dark Enlightenment (Imperium Press, 2022) ISBN 978-1922602688.
- Xenosystems (Passage Publishing, 2024) ASIN B0D8MNTVHY
- Urban Future (Noumena Institute, 2025) ISBN 978-1922602688.
- Outsideness: 2013–2023 (Noumena Institute, 2025) ISBN 978-0646712703.
- Occult Xenosystems (Noumena Institute, 2025) ISBN 978-0646730295
