= Benjamin Noys =

British critical theorist

- Born: 1969 (age 56–57)
- Occupation: Critical theorist
- Known for: Coining the term "accelerationism"

Benjamin Noys is a British critical theorist and professor at the University of Chichester and the theorist who coined the term accelerationism within cultural ideology.

== Early life ==
Benjamin Noys completed a BSc at Brunel University and both MA and DPhil from Sussex University.

== Career ==
Noys is an academic critical theorist who is best known for borrowing the term accelerationism from the science fiction author Roger Zelazny and developing it within cultural and intellectual contexts. Noys is a critic of accelerationism, which is used by many far-left and far-right extremists to justify speeding up societal changes to break the current system and allow society to rebuild in a post-capitalistic world.

Noys has also been a critic of cryptocurrency, which has been linked to accelerationism.

== Books ==
- Georges Bataille: A Critical Introduction (Pluto Press, 2000)
- Persistence of the Negative: A Critique of Contemporary Continental Theory (Edinburgh University Press, 2010)
- Malign Velocities (Zer0 Books, 2014)
- The Matter of Language: Abstraction and Poetry (Seagull Books, 2023)
- Envisioning the Good Life (Edinburgh University Press, 2025)

== See also ==
- Accelerationism
- Effective accelerationism
- Nick Land
