= Lawrence Lek =

Multimedia artist (born 1982)

Lawrence Lek (Chinese: 陆明龙;) is a multimedia artist, filmmaker, and musician based in London. His works include the films "AIDOL", "Geomancer", "Sinofuturism (1839–2046 AD)", the open world video game simulations "2065", "Europa, Mon Amour (2016 Brexit Edition)", "Unreal Estate (The Royal Academy is Yours)", and "Nøtel", an audio-visual collaboration with Kode9. Lek describes himself as a simulation artist, and uses 3D rendering technology in his work. He is credited for popularizing sinofuturism in his video essay of the same name.

Born in 1982 in Frankfurt am Main, Lek is of Malaysian Chinese descent, attended Westminster School, a private school in London, and studied architecture at Trinity College, Cambridge, the Architectural Association and Cooper Union in New York. He is represented by Sadie Coles HQ, London.
