= David Farrell Krell =

German philosopher

- Born: 1944 (age 81–82)

Education
- Education: Duquesne University (PhD, 1971)
- Academic advisor: John Sallis

Philosophical work
- Era: Contemporary philosophy
- Region: Western philosophy
- School: Continental philosophy; Phenomenology
- Institutions: University of Essex; DePaul University
- Doctoral students: Nick Land
- Main interests: German idealism, German Romanticism

David Farrell Krell (born 1944) is an American philosopher. He is professor emeritus of philosophy at DePaul University.

== Career ==
He received his Ph.D. in philosophy at Duquesne University, where he wrote his dissertation on Heidegger and Nietzsche. He has taught at many universities in Germany, France, and England. Specializing in Continental philosophy, he has written many books on Heidegger and Nietzsche, including Daimon Life: Heidegger and Life Philosophy (1992), Intimations of Mortality: Time, Truth, and Finitude in Heidegger's Thinking of Being (1986), The Good European: Nietzsche's Work Sites in Word and Image (1997), and Infectious Nietzsche (1996). Additionally, Krell has written extensively about German idealism, his books in this area include The Tragic Absolute: German Idealism and the Languishing of God (2005), and Contagion: Sexuality, Disease, and Death in German Idealism and Romanticism (Indiana, 1998). Krell has also translated Heidegger's lectures on Nietzsche, and was the editor of Heidegger's Basic Writings (1977).

Krell recalled that reading Jacques Derrida's Spurs: Nietzsche's Styles changed his perspective while he was editing and translating Heidegger's work on Nietzsche.

== Works ==
- The Cudgel and the Caress: Reflections on Cruelty and Tenderness (SUNY, 2019)
- The Sea: A Philosophical Encounter (Bloomsbury, 2018)
- Ecstasy, Catastrophe: Heidegger from Being and Time to the Black Notebooks (SUNY, 2015)
- Phantoms of the Other: Four Generations of Derrida's Geschlecht (SUNY, 2015)
- Derrida and Our Animal Others: Derrida's Final Seminar, the Beast and the Sovereign (Indiana, U.P., 2013)
- The Tragic Absolute: German Idealism and the Languishing of God (Indiana, 2005)
- The Purest of Bastards: Works on Mourning, Art, and Affirmation in the Thought of Jacques Derrida (Pennsylvania, 2000)
- Contagion: Sexuality, Disease, and Death in German Idealism and Romanticism (Indiana, 1998)
- Archeticture [sic]: Ecstasies of Space, Time, and the Human Body (SUNY, 1997)
- Son of Spirit: A Novel (SUNY, 1997)
- The Good European: Nietzsche's Work Sites in Word and Image, with Donald Bates (Chicago, 1997)
- Infectious Nietzsche (Indiana, 1996)
- Nietzsche: A Novel, (SUNY, 1996)
- Lunar Voices: Of Tragedy, Poetry, Fiction, and Thought (Chicago, 1995)
- Daimon Life: Heidegger and Life-Philosophy (Indiana, 1992)
- Of Memory, Reminiscence, and Writing: On the Verge (Indiana, 1990)
- Postponements: Woman, Sensuality, and Death in Nietzsche (Indiana 1986)
- Intimations of Mortality: Time, Truth, and Finitude in Heidegger's Thinking of Being (Pennsylvania UP, 1986)

As editor and translator

- Friedrich Hölderlin, The Death of Empedocles (Ed., Introduction) (SUNY Press, 2008)
- Martin Heidegger, Nietzsche: Volumes Three and Four. (Trans.) (New York HarperOne, 1991)
- Martin Heidegger, Nietzsche: Volumes One and Two. (Trans.) (New York HarperOne, 1991)
- Martin Heidegger, Basic Writings (Ed.) (HarperCollins, 1977)
