= Speculative philosophy =

Philosophical concept

Speculative philosophy is philosophy that seeks to reflect on all aspects of human experience to construct a comprehensive view of reality. Its aim is to integrate the insights from various domains into a unified understanding of existence.

Historically, speculative philosophy has been central to the work of philosophers like Plato, Georg Wilhelm Friedrich Hegel, and Alfred North Whitehead, who all developed large-scale theories about reality, existence, and knowledge. The term was coined by C. D. Broad as a distinction from critical philosophy.

== See also ==
- Speculative idealism
- Speculative realism
