= Accelerator-in-Chief =

Satirical nickname for Xi Jinping

Accelerator-in-Chief (simplified Chinese: 总加速师; traditional Chinese: 總加速師; pinyin: zǒng jiāsù shī) is a nickname or jargon used by opponents of General Secretary of the Chinese Communist Party Xi Jinping, whose internal and foreign policies accelerate/expedite the process of either "bringing China to a strong rivalry with the superpowers", or "the collapse of the CCP". This term is patterned after Architect-in-Chief (Chinese: 总设计师), a commonly used title for Deng Xiaoping, the Chinese leader who initiated the Reform and Opening of the PRC.

It became popular in early 2020 on Twitter and is widely used by Chinese dissidents as a slang to express dissatisfaction with censorship and highhand policies. Some users think if the system is beyond repair, instead of opposing or correcting its problems, it is a better choice to accelerate its original course towards demise.
