= Sadie Plant =

British cultural theorist (born 1964)

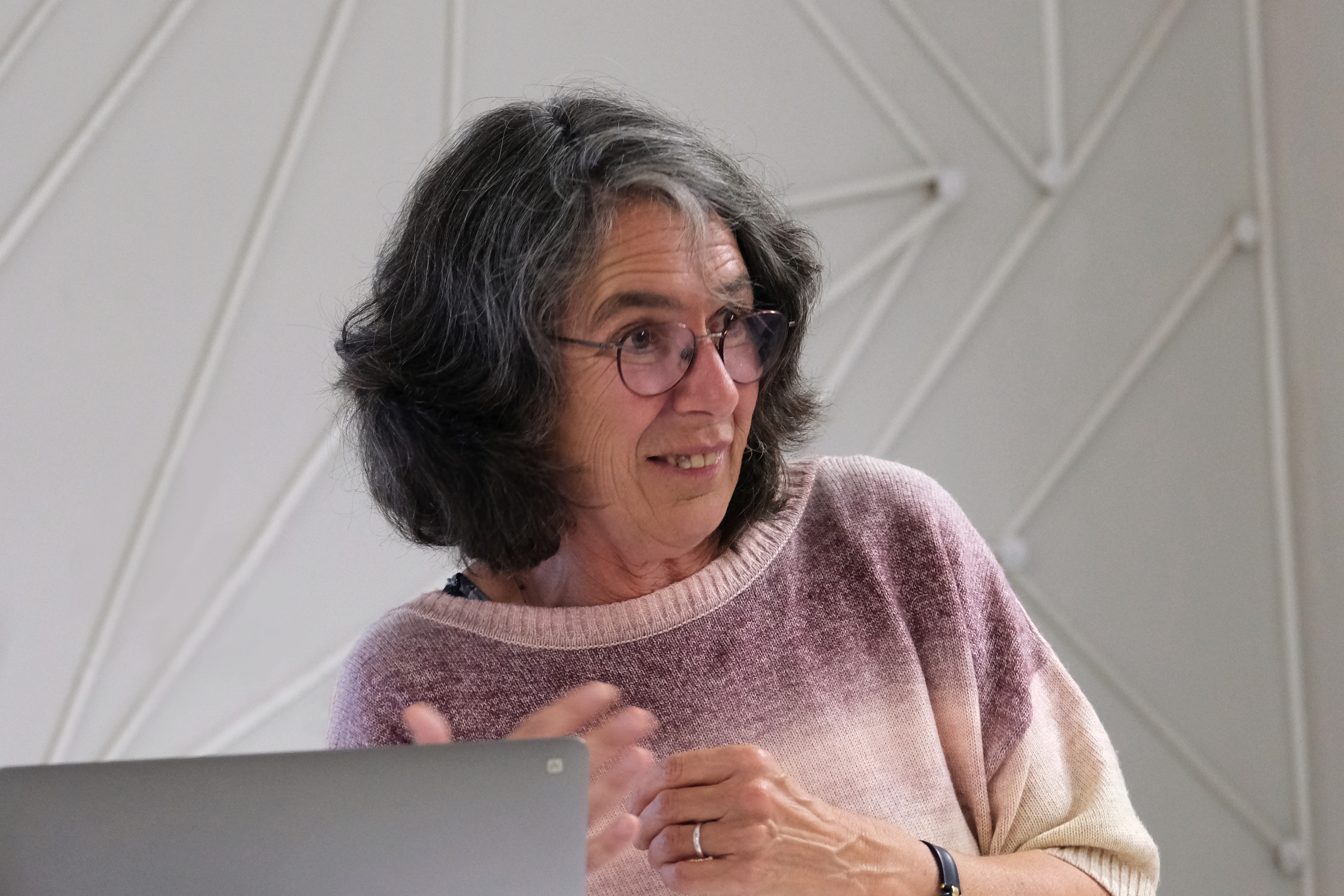
- Plant in 2024
- Born: Sarah Jane Plant; 16 March 1964 (age 62); Birmingham, England
- Education: University of Manchester
- Occupations: Philosopher, author, scholar
- Known for: The Most Radical Gesture; Zeros + Ones; Writing on Drugs
- Website: www.sadieplant.com

Sadie Plant (born Sarah Jane Plant; 16 March 1964) is a British philosopher, cultural theorist, and author.

She is best known for her work in feminism, particularly cyberfeminism. Plant's work is primarily concerned with the impacts of technological developments, including the side effects of its progress.

Plant's publications include books, commissioned reports, articles, and translations from German into English.

== Education ==
She earned her PhD in philosophy from the University of Manchester in 1989 and subsequently taught at the University of Birmingham's Department of Cultural Studies (formerly the Centre for Contemporary Cultural Studies) before going on to found the Cybernetic Culture Research Unit with colleague Nick Land at the University of Warwick, where she was a faculty member. Her original research was related to the Situationist International before turning to the social and political potential of cyber-technology. Her writing in the 1990s would prove influential in the development of cyberfeminism.

== Career ==
Sadie Plant left the University of Warwick at the end of 1996 to write full-time. She published a cultural history of drug use and control, and a report on the social effects of mobile phones, as well as articles in publications as varied as the Financial Times, Wired, Blueprint, and Dazed and Confused. She published the book Zeros + Ones in 1997, in which she writes about the entwined history of women and the field of cybernetics through the figure of Ada Lovelace. She was interviewed as one of the 'People to Watch' in the Winter 2000–2001 issue of Time.

She has written for many artists, including Susan Morris and Bea Schlingelhoff, and recently collaborated with Jiajia Zhang.

== Publications ==
- The Most Radical Gesture: The Situationist International in a Postmodern Age (1992, Routledge) ISBN 0-415-06222-5
- Zeros + Ones: Digital Women and the New Technoculture (1997, Doubleday) ISBN 0-385-48260-4
- Writing on Drugs (1999, Faber and Faber) ISBN 0-571-19616-0
- Comment lire a bookshelf in einem Buch, Spector, Leipzig, 2025 ISBN 9783959057493

== General references ==
- The Independent
- The Independent
- http://www.faber.co.uk/author/sadie-plant/
- http://www2.tate.org.uk/intermediaart/entry15419.shtm
- http://www.v2.nl/archive/people/sadie-plant
- https://web.archive.org/web/20120308043525/http://www.rigb.org/contentControl?action=displayContent&id=00000001211
- http://future-nonstop.org/c/bb37122bc11c3dd0787d5205d9debc41
- http://www.ephemerajournal.org/sites/default/files/3-1plantandland.pdf
