= Collapse (journal) =

UK magazine

Collapse was an independent, non-affiliated magazine of philosophical research and development. It was published in the United Kingdom by Urbanomic. It was associated with the philosophy of speculative realism.

== History and profile ==
Collapse was founded in 2006 by Maya B. Kronic. It served as a successor to the ***collapse journal that operated between 1995 and 1996 and was edited by Maya B. Kronic with Robert O'Toole. The magazine was based in Oxford. It featured speculative work in progress by contemporary philosophers, along with contributions from artists, scientists and other writers outside of philosophy. In December 2008, as a part of BBC Today guest editor Zadie Smith's programme, the author Hari Kunzru listed Urbanomic's Collapse as an avant-garde philosophy journal in his A guide to the artistic underground. The magazine's output is collected in eight volumes, the last of which was published in December 2014. As of January 2026, a ninth volume, which was to be titled Logic of Scents, was listed as 'forthcoming' with an unspecified date.
