= Steven Shaviro =

American cultural critic

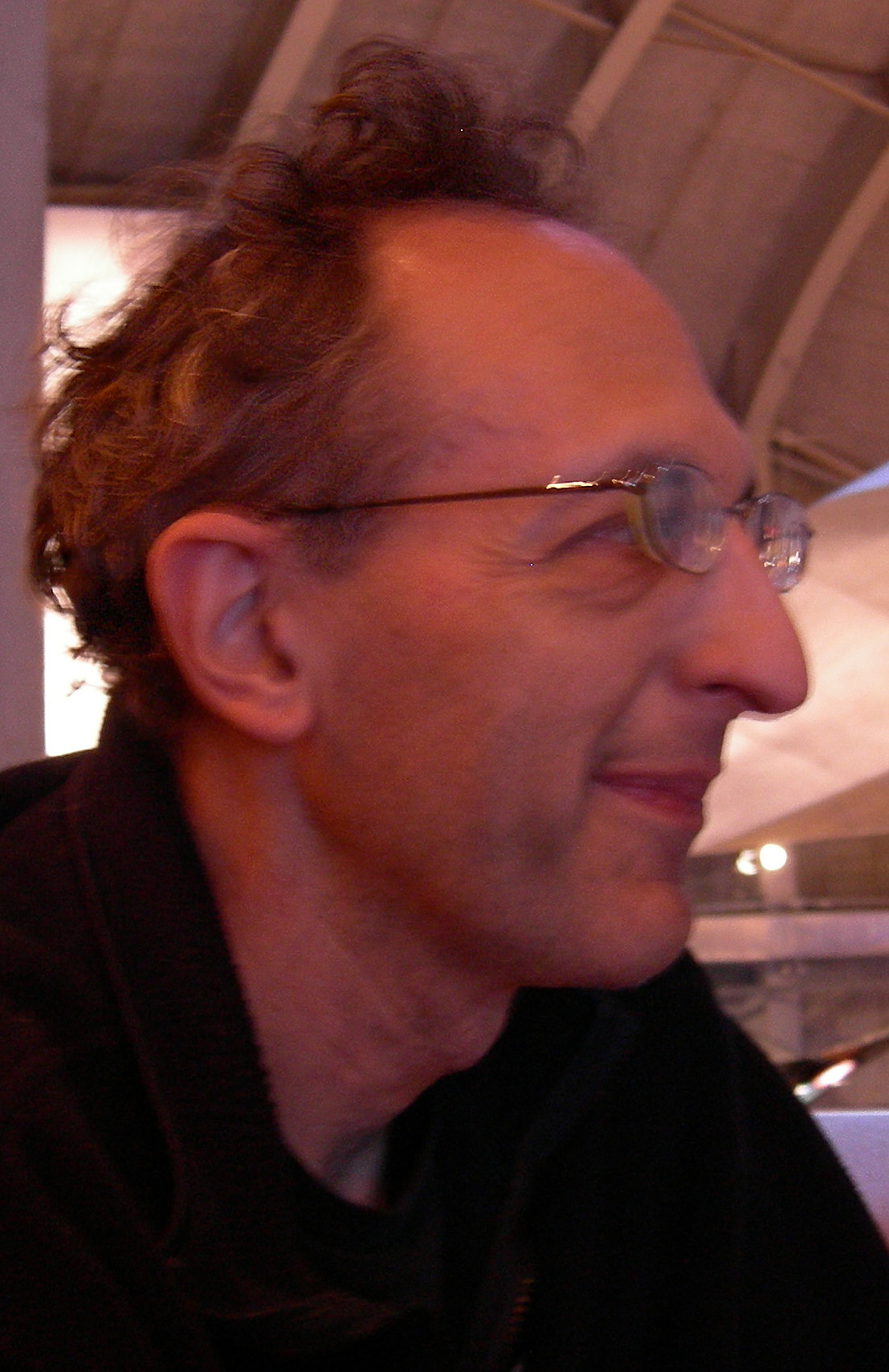
Steven Shaviro (2007)

Steven Shaviro (/ʃəˈvɪroʊ/; born 1954) is an American academic, philosopher, and cultural critic whose areas of interest include film theory, time, science fiction, panpsychism, capitalism, affect and subjectivity. He earned a B.A. in English in 1975, M.A. in English in 1978, and a Ph.D. in English in 1981, all from Yale University. From 1984 to 2004, he was a professor of English at the University of Washington, and since 2004 teaches film, culture and English at Wayne State University, where he is the DeRoy Professor of English.

== Career ==
His most widely read book is Doom Patrols, a "theoretical fiction" that outlines the state of postmodernism during the early 1990s, using poetic language, personal anecdotes, and creative prose. He has also written extensively about music videos as an artform.

Shaviro has written a book about film theory, The Cinematic Body, which according to the preface is "about postmodernism, the politics of human bodies, constructions of masculinity, and the aesthetics of masochism." It also examines Julia Kristeva's concept of abjection and the dominance of Lacanian tropes in contemporary academic film theory. According to Shaviro, the use of psychoanalysis has mirrored the actions of a cult, with its own religious texts (essays by Freud and Lacan).

Shaviro's book Connected, Or, What It Means to Live in the Network Society, appeared in 2003. A later book, Without Criteria: Kant, Whitehead, Deleuze, and Aesthetics was published in May 2009. Five years later, he wrote a book about speculative realism in philosophy, inspired by Alfred North Whitehead.

In 2023 Shaviro wrote in a Facebook post, "Although I do not advocate violating federal and state criminal codes, I think it is far more admirable to kill a racist, homophobic or transphobic speaker than it is to shout them down. [...] The exemplary historical figure in this regard is Sholem Schwarzbard [link added], who assassinated the anti-Semitic butcher Symon Petliura, rather than trying to shout him down. Remember that Schwarzbard was acquitted by a jury, which found his action justified." Wayne State University President M. Roy Wilson suspended Shaviro with pay and referred the matter to law enforcement. Shaviro was not indicted or charged for any matter related to this suspension.

== Bibliography ==
- Shaviro, Steven (1990). Passion and Excess: Blanchot, Bataille, and Literary Theory, Tallahassee: Florida State University Press.
- ——— (1993). The Cinematic Body, Minneapolis: University of Minnesota Press.
- ——— (1997): Doom Patrols: A Theoretical Fiction about Postmodernism, London: Serpent's Tail.
- ——— (2003). Connected, or What it Means to Live in the Network Society, Minneapolis: University of Minnesota Press.
- ——— (2009). Without Criteria: Kant, Whitehead, Deleuze, and Aesthetics, Cambridge, MA: The MIT Press.
- ——— (2010). Post Cinematic Affect, Winchester: Zer0 books.
- ——— (2014). The Universe of Things: On Speculative Realism, Minneapolis, MN: University of Minnesota Press.
- ——— (2016). Discognition, Repeater Books.
- ——— (2017). Digital Music Videos, Rutgers University Press, 2017.
