= Amphetamine dependence =

- The structural formula of methamphetamine
- Specialty: Toxicology, psychiatry

Amphetamine dependence refers to a state of psychological dependence on a drug in the amphetamine class. Related clinical and research terminology includes amphetamine abuse or dependence and stimulant use disorder. Stimulants such as amphetamines and cocaine do not cause somatic symptoms upon cessation of use but rather neurological-based mental symptoms.

Signs of amphetamine intoxication manifest themselves in euphoria, hypersexuality, tachycardia, diaphoresis, and intensifications of the train of thought, speech, and movement. Over time, neurodegenerative changes become apparent in the form of altered behavior, reduced cognitive functions, and signs of neurological damage, such as a decrease in the levels of dopamine transporters (DAT) and serotonin transporters (SERT) in the brain. Amphetamine use within teenagers can have lasting effects on their brain, in particular the prefrontal cortex. Amphetamine use is rising among students due to the ability to easily access prescribed stimulants like Adderall. Also, in case of chronic use, vegetative disorders soon occur such as bouts of sweating, trouble sleeping, tremor, ataxia and diarrhea; the degradation of the personality takes place relatively slowly. Tolerance is expected to develop with regular substituted amphetamine use. When substituted amphetamines are used, drug tolerance develops rapidly. Amphetamine dependence has shown to have the highest remission rate compared to cannabis, cocaine, and opioids. Severe withdrawal associated with dependence from recreational substituted amphetamine use can be difficult for a user to cope with. Long-term use of certain substituted amphetamines, particularly methamphetamine, can reduce dopamine activity in the brain.

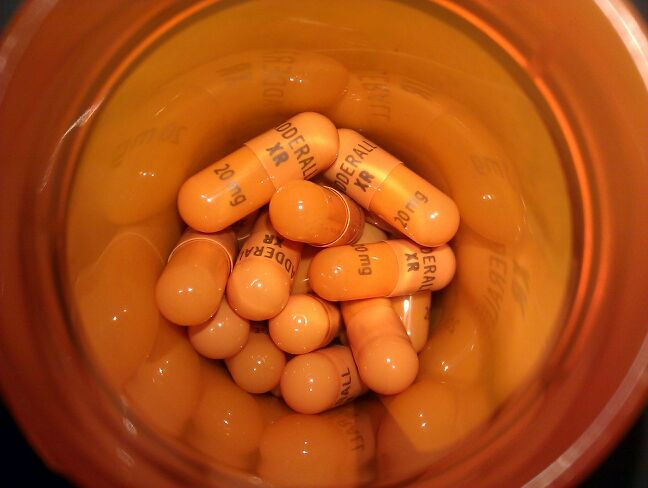
Adderall- Prescribed Amphetamine

For amphetamine dependent individuals, psychotherapy is currently the best treatment option as no pharmacological treatment has been approved. Another treatment option for amphetamine dependence is aversion therapy based on classical conditioning module; this will combine the amphetamine with a negative thing or opposite stimulus. Treatment for amphetamines is growing at extremely high rates around the world. Psychostimulants that increase dopamine and mimic the effects of substituted amphetamines, but with lower abuse liability, could theoretically be used as replacement therapy in amphetamine dependence. However, the few studies that used amphetamine, bupropion, methylphenidate, and modafinil as a replacement therapy did not result in less methamphetamine use or craving.
