= Reza Negarestani =

Iranian philosopher and writer (born 1977)

- Born: 1977 (age 48–49); Shiraz, Pahlavi Iran

Philosophical work
- Era: Contemporary philosophy
- Region: Western philosophy
- School: Continental philosophy Speculative realism (early); Rationalism; Modern Platonism
- Institutions: The New Centre for Research & Practice
- Main interests: Philosophy of science, philosophy of mind
- Notable ideas: Theory-fiction, philosophy of intelligence

Reza Negarestani (born 1977) is an Iranian philosopher and writer, known for "pioneering the genre of 'theory-fiction' with his book Cyclonopedia which was published in 2008. It was listed in Artforum as one of the best books of 2009. He is also known for his 2018 book Intelligence and Spirit, which attempts to provide a functionalist description of intelligence. Currently, he directs the critical philosophy programme at The New Centre for Research & Practice.

== Philosophical work ==
Negarestani has been a regular contributor to Collapse, as well as other print and web publications such as CTheory. On March 11, 2011, faculty from Brooklyn College and The New School organized a symposium to discuss Cyclonopedia titled Leper Creativity. Later on in the year, Punctum books published a book with the same title that included essays, articles, artworks, and documents from or related to the symposium. In 2011, he co-edited Collapse's issue VII with Maya B. Kronic titled "Culinary Materialism". In 2012, Negarestani collaborated with Florian Hecker on an artwork titled "Chimerization" that was included in the dOCUMENTA (13) exhibition. He has since written librettos for a series of full-length albums based on Hecker's concept of 'chimerization'.

After being associated with the philosophical movement of speculative realism for several years, Negarestani has since lectured and written about rationalist universalism beginning with the evolution of the modern system of knowledge and advancing toward contemporary philosophies of rationalism, their procedures as well as their demands for special forms of human conduct.

After going through different philosophical phases starting with Nick Land and subsequently speculative realism, Negarestani turned to rationalist inhumanism, according to which the concept of the human is under-explored and is a matter of theoretical and practical investigation, the results of which will lead to a thoroughgoing new conception of the human that stands in opposition to classical versions of humanism and human essentialism. Research paradigms such as artificial general intelligence and neuroscience, according to Negarestani, provide insights as how the concept of the human is underdeveloped and must be understood as a subject of critical construction.

Accordingly, Negarestani's philosophical project deals with what he calls a philosophy of intelligence as in contrast to the philosophy of mind. For Negarestani, the philosophy of intelligence goes beyond the philosophy of mind insofar as the concept of intelligence is beholden to a system of socially constituted thoughts and practices through which the intelligible is recognized. However, for Negarestani the term intelligence remains a philosophically vague concept, an explicandum. With a nod to Rudolf Carnap's project of explication, Negarestani instead proposes a conceptual engineering whereby the concept of intelligence is progressively replaced by its explicata, or refined concepts which methodically address different issues with regard to the question of "what is intelligence".

Negarestani's blog, Toy Philosophy, "focus[es] on various threads—some still loose and some already converged—of [his] philosophical research".

== Bibliography ==
=== Books ===
- Negarestani, Reza (2008). Cyclonopedia: Complicity with Anonymous Materials. Anomaly. Seddon London: Re.Press. ISBN 978-0-9805440-0-8.
- Negarestani, Reza; Mackay, Robin, eds. (2012). Collapse Volume VII: Culinary Materialism. Falmouth: Urbanomic. ISBN 978-0-9567750-9-2.
- Negarestani, Reza (2014). Torture Concrete: Jean-Luc Moulène and the Protocol of Abstraction. London: Sequence Press. ISBN 978-0-9832169-7-1.
- Negarestani, Reza (2018). Intelligence and Spirit. London: Urbanomic & Sequence Press. ISBN 978-0-9975674-0-3.
- Negarestani, Reza; Mackay, Robin; Tilford, Keith (2021). Chronosis. London: Urbanomic. ISBN 978-1-913029-54-8.
- (Forthcoming) Negarestani, Reza. Abducting the Outside: Collected Writings 2003–2018. London: Urbanomic & Sequence Press. ISBN 978-0-9975674-8-9.
