= Speculative realism =

Movement in contemporary Continental-inspired philosophy

Speculative realism is a movement in contemporary Continental-inspired philosophy (also known as post-Continental philosophy) that defines itself loosely in its stance of metaphysical realism against its interpretation of the dominant forms of post-Kantian philosophy (or what it terms "correlationism").

== Origins ==
Speculative realism takes its name from a conference held at Goldsmiths College, University of London in April 2007. The conference was moderated by Alberto Toscano of Goldsmiths College, and featured presentations by Ray Brassier of American University of Beirut (then at Middlesex University), Iain Hamilton Grant of the University of the West of England, Graham Harman of the American University in Cairo, and Quentin Meillassoux of the École Normale Supérieure in Paris. Credit for the name "speculative realism" is generally ascribed to Brassier, though Meillassoux had already used the term "speculative materialism" to describe his own position.

A second conference, entitled "Speculative Realism/Speculative Materialism", took place at the UWE Bristol on Friday 24 April 2009, two years after the original event at Goldsmiths. The line-up consisted of Ray Brassier, Iain Hamilton Grant, Graham Harman, and (in place of Meillassoux, who was unable to attend) Alberto Toscano.

A third conference, entitled "Object Oriented Ontology: A Symposium", was held at Georgia Institute of Technology's School of Literature, Communication and Culture (now the School of Literature, Media, and Communication) on April 23, 2010. This symposium was hosted by Ian Bogost and included Levi Bryant, Graham Harman, Steven Shaviro, Hugh Crawford, Carl DiSalvo, John Johnston, Barbara Maria Stafford, and Eugene Thacker.

While speculative realism's status has gained significant popularity, there are philosophical positions which some consider analogous. According to Graham Harman's forward in Maurizio Ferraris' Manifesto of New Realism, contemporary writings in "new realism" are thematically parallel to speculative realism, sharing common themes and interests. Harman states that it was an "inadvertent injustice" to not include Ferraris' ideas among contemporary continental realists, as he had held this philosophical position earlier than speculative realists at a time when realism in the continental tradition was a "lonelier" commitment. However, despite analogous interests, the two perspectives of realism remain mostly separate conversations. In Hysteresis, a book published in Edinburgh's Speculative Realism series, Ferraris positioned his thoughts more explicitly in relation to the works of many of the names previously mentioned. He fashions a critique similar to Meillassoux's of Kant.

Nick Land has also been noted as an influence on speculative realism, having taught Brassier and Grant as well as influencing associated figures such as Robin Mackay and Reza Negarestani.

== Critique of correlationism ==
While often in disagreement over basic philosophical issues, the speculative realist thinkers have a shared resistance to what they interpret as philosophies of human finitude inspired by the tradition of Immanuel Kant.

What unites the four core members of the movement is an attempt to overcome both "correlationism" and "philosophies of access". All four of the core thinkers within speculative realism work to overturn these forms of philosophy which privilege the human being, favouring distinct forms of realism against the dominant forms of idealism in much of contemporary Continental philosophy.

In After Finitude, Meillassoux defines correlationism as "the idea according to which we only ever have access to the correlation between thinking and being, and never to either term considered apart from the other." Philosophies of access are any of those philosophies which privilege the human being over other entities. For speculative realists, both ideas represent forms of anthropocentrism. Many critiquing correlationism and philosophies of access typically are critiquing the excessive association of ontology with human-centric phenomenology. New realism, ultimately is critiquing thinking and being's association, and as such is within the same conversation. However, Ferraris approaches this problem slightly differently than Meillassoux. Ferraris structures his critique of the "thinking and being" association in relation to the areas of epistemology and ontology respectively instead of phenomenology and ontology.

== Variations ==
While sharing in the goal of overturning the dominant strands of post-Kantian thought in Continental philosophy, there are important differences separating the core members of the speculative realist movement and their followers.

=== Speculative materialism ===
In his critique of correlationism, Quentin Meillassoux (who uses the term speculative materialism to describe his position) finds two principles as the focus of Kant's philosophy. The first is the "principle of correlation" itself, which claims essentially that we can only know the correlate of Thought and Being; what lies outside that correlate is unknowable. The second is termed by Meillassoux the "principle of factiality" which states that things could be otherwise than what they are. This principle is upheld by Kant in his defence of the thing-in-itself as unknowable but imaginable. We can imagine reality as being fundamentally different even if we never know such a reality. According to Meillassoux, the defence of both principles leads to "weak" correlationism (such as those of Kant and Husserl), while the rejection of the thing-in-itself leads to the "strong" correlationism of thinkers such as late Ludwig Wittgenstein and late Martin Heidegger, for whom it makes no sense to suppose that there is anything outside of the correlate of Thought and Being, and so the principle of factiality is eliminated in favour of a strengthened principle of correlation.

Meillassoux follows the opposite tactic in rejecting the principle of correlation for the sake of a bolstered principle of factiality in his post-Kantian return to Hume. By arguing in favour of such a principle, Meillassoux is led to reject the necessity not only of all physical laws of nature, but all logical laws except the Principle of Non-Contradiction (since eliminating this would undermine the Principle of Factiality which claims that things can always be otherwise than what they are). By rejecting the Principle of Sufficient Reason, there can be no justification for the necessity of physical laws, meaning that while the universe may be ordered in such and such a way, there is no reason it could not be otherwise. Meillassoux rejects the Kantian a priori in favour of a Humean a priori, claiming that the lesson to be learned from Hume on the subject of causality is that "the same cause may actually bring about 'a hundred different events' (and even many more)."

The primary foundation from which Meillassoux extends the rest of his theory by arguing for a principle: the necessity of contingency itself. That is, the only thing objectively necessary is that no thing/object is necessary to every subject. Thus, all things are contingent. Using this as an objective position, he proceeds to redevelop a metaphysics for science and technology which recovers what he calls ancestral events: materially real events which occur outside of phenomenological subjectivity. He claims that without the objectivity of contingency, a philosopher of metaphysics should reject that such events like the Big Bang are legitimate. Although, some have argued that the problem is not that these ancestral events are outside of human notions of time, since many such examples of these events in fact do have materially sensible data which places them in terms of human interpretations of time, but rather it applies more strongly to real things which are not empirically observable: e.g. quarks or genetic information. While not committed entirely to speculative materialism, Yuk Hui references and uses an analogous line of reasoning in Recursivity and Contingency in his development of cosmotechnics, and actively works within similar philosophical lineages.

=== Object-oriented ontology ===
The central tenet of Graham Harman and Levi Bryant's object-oriented ontology (OOO) is that objects have been neglected in philosophy in favor of a "radical philosophy" that tries to "undermine" objects by saying that objects are the crusts to a deeper underlying reality, either in the form of monism or a perpetual flux, or those that try to "overmine" objects by saying that the idea of a whole object is a form of folk ontology. According to Harman, everything is an object, whether it be a mailbox, electromagnetic radiation, curved spacetime, the Commonwealth of Nations, or a propositional attitude; all things, whether physical or fictional, are equally objects. Sympathetic to panpsychism, Harman proposes a new philosophical discipline called "speculative psychology" dedicated to investigating the "cosmic layers of psyche" and "ferreting out the specific psychic reality of earthworms, dust, armies, chalk, and stone".

Harman defends a version of the Aristotelian notion of substance. Unlike Leibniz, for whom there were both substances and aggregates, Harman maintains that when objects combine, they create new objects. In this way, he defends an a priori metaphysics that claims that reality is made up only of objects and that there is no "bottom" to the series of objects. For Harman, an object is in itself an infinite recess, unknowable and inaccessible by any other thing. This leads to his account of what he terms "vicarious causality". Inspired by the occasionalists of medieval Islamic philosophy, Harman maintains that no two objects can ever interact save through the mediation of a "sensual vicar". There are two types of objects, then, for Harman: real objects and the sensual objects that allow for interaction. The former are the things of everyday life, while the latter are the caricatures that mediate interaction. For example, when fire burns cotton, Harman argues that the fire does not touch the essence of that cotton which is inexhaustible by any relation, but that the interaction is mediated by a caricature of the cotton which causes it to burn.

=== Transcendental materialism ===
Iain Hamilton Grant defends a position he calls transcendental materialism. He argues against what he terms "somatism", the philosophy and physics of bodies. In his Philosophies of Nature After Schelling, Grant tells a new history of philosophy from Plato onward based on the definition of matter. Aristotle distinguished between Form and Matter in such a way that Matter was invisible to philosophy, whereas Grant argues for a return to the Platonic Matter as not only the basic building blocks of reality, but the forces and powers that govern our reality. He traces this same argument to the post-Kantian German idealists Johann Gottlieb Fichte and Friedrich Wilhelm Joseph Schelling, claiming that the distinction between Matter as substantive versus useful fiction persists to this day and that we should end our attempts to overturn Plato and instead attempt to overturn Kant and return to "speculative physics" in the Platonic tradition, that is, not a physics of bodies, but a "physics of the All".

Eugene Thacker has examined how the concept of "life itself" is both determined within regional philosophy and also how "life itself" comes to acquire metaphysical properties. His book After Life shows how the ontology of life operates by way of a split between "Life" and "the living," making possible a "metaphysical displacement" in which life is thought via another metaphysical term, such as time, form, or spirit: "Every ontology of life thinks of life in terms of something-other-than-life...that something-other-than-life is most often a metaphysical concept, such as time and temporality, form and causality, or spirit and immanence" Thacker traces this theme from Aristotle, to Scholasticism and mysticism/negative theology, to Spinoza and Kant, showing how this three-fold displacement is also alive in philosophy today (life as time in process philosophy and Deleuzianism, life as form in biopolitical thought, life as spirit in post-secular philosophies of religion). Thacker examines the relation of speculative realism to the ontology of life, arguing for a "vitalist correlation": "Let us say that a vitalist correlation is one that fails to conserve the correlationist dual necessity of the separation and inseparability of thought and object, self and world, and which does so based on some ontologized notion of 'life'.''. Ultimately Thacker argues for a skepticism regarding "life": "Life is not only a problem of philosophy, but a problem for philosophy."

Other thinkers have emerged within this group, united in their allegiance to what has been known as "process philosophy", rallying around such thinkers as Schelling, Bergson, Whitehead, and Deleuze, among others. A recent example is found in Steven Shaviro's book Without Criteria: Kant, Whitehead, Deleuze, and Aesthetics, which argues for a process-based approach that entails panpsychism as much as it does vitalism or animism. For Shaviro, it is Whitehead's philosophy of prehensions and nexus that offers the best combination of continental and analytical philosophy. Another recent example is found in Jane Bennett's book Vibrant Matter, which argues for a shift from human relations to things, to a "vibrant matter" that cuts across the living and non-living, human bodies and non-human bodies. Leon Niemoczynski, in his book Charles Sanders Peirce and a Religious Metaphysics of Nature, invokes what he calls "speculative naturalism" so as to argue that nature can afford lines of insight into its own infinitely productive "vibrant" ground, which he identifies as natura naturans. In Speculative Realism: An Introduction, Graham Harman refers to Grant's position as "Vitalist idealism".

=== Transcendental nihilism ===
In Nihil Unbound: Enlightenment and Extinction, Ray Brassier defends what Michael Austin, Paul Ennis, Fabio Gironi term as transcendental nihilism. He maintains that philosophy has avoided the traumatic idea of extinction, instead attempting to find meaning in a world conditioned by the very idea of its own annihilation. Thus Brassier critiques both the phenomenological and hermeneutic strands of continental philosophy as well as the vitality of thinkers like Gilles Deleuze, who work to ingrain meaning in the world and stave off the "threat" of nihilism. Instead, drawing on thinkers such as Alain Badiou, François Laruelle, Paul Churchland and Thomas Metzinger, Brassier defends a view of the world as inherently devoid of meaning. That is, rather than avoiding nihilism, Brassier embraces it as the truth of reality. Brassier concludes from his readings of Badiou and Laruelle that the universe is founded on the nothing, but also that philosophy is the "organon of extinction," that it is only because life is conditioned by its own extinction that there is thought at all. Brassier then defends a radically anti-correlationist philosophy proposing that Thought is conjoined not with Being, but with Non-Being.

This nihilistic trend within speculative thought has been simultaneously embraced and rejected by Drew M. Dalton. For Dalton, while Being must inevitably be acknowledged as a movement towards Non-Being, or what he calls "unbecoming," he argues that the ontological fact of annihilation does not necessarily annihilate or invalidate human attempts to derive or develop normative values or synthetic metaphysical meanings from the nature of Being. Instead, he claims, it grounds the possibility of seeing in "unbecoming" another set of meanings and values all together. Hence, his suggestion that a full reckoning with the fact of annihilation should not result in "the nihilation of metaphysics," but instead the development of a "metaphysics of nihilation." This is something he attempts to accomplish in his The Matter of Evil: From Speculative Realism to Ethical Pessimism. In Speculative Realism: An Introduction, Graham Harman refers to Brassier's position as "Prometheanism".

== Controversy over the term "philosophical movement" ==
In an interview with Kronos magazine published in March 2011, Ray Brassier denied that there is any such thing as a "speculative realist movement" and firmly distanced himself from those who continue to attach themselves to the brand name:

The "speculative realist movement" exists only in the imaginations of a group of bloggers promoting an agenda for which I have no sympathy whatsoever: actor-network theory spiced with pan-psychist metaphysics and morsels of process philosophy. I don't believe the internet is an appropriate medium for serious philosophical debate; nor do I believe it is acceptable to try to concoct a philosophical movement online by using blogs to exploit the misguided enthusiasm of impressionable graduate students. I agree with Deleuze's remark that ultimately the most basic task of philosophy is to impede stupidity, so I see little philosophical merit in a "movement" whose most signal achievement thus far is to have generated an online orgy of stupidity.

While less critical, Tom Sparrow's affirms Brassier's criticism of the movement of "Speculative Realists" while providing a little more exposition to what speculative realism actually does as a style of thought.

[F]ew thinkers do identify themselves as such. At the end of the day, however, self-identification is just as unhelpful for locating speculative realists as it is for validating phenomenologists. What counts are ontological commitments, the assertions of existence to which a philosopher commits himself or herself.

Sparrow's point reflects his position that while many point to canonical "phenomenologists", in his reading of them, all of them betray the movement of phenomenology at times in their own thought. As such, while it is pragmatic to refer to a philosopher as a "phenomenologist", claiming they are completely committed to the phenomenological method does injustice to their commitments when they abandon what he believes is a strong idealist method for philosophical realism. Sparrow makes the case that like phenomenology, the speculative realist "movement" is more of a style of philosophy.

Brassier goes further, suggesting that a philosophical movement cannot believably be bound to merely anti-correlationism. Despite this, many of those who discuss different approaches to escape Meillassoux's correlationist cycle, suggesting active philosophical discourse on a particular topic. Ian Bogost's work, Alien Phenomenology, rethinks what OOO phenomenology would be while others argue OOO rejects phenomenology outright. Similarly, Steven Shaviro actively endorses panpsychism and reaffirms his earlier endorsement of process philosophy, rejecting certain aspects of Harman's work and Brassier's criticisms about the existence of a movement. Additionally Jane Bennett's Vibrant Matter also enables forms of phenomenology as she exemplifies through several chapters. In doing so, these authors suggest some form of phenomenology in speculative realism despite the rejection of correlationist philosophy.

As such, one of the fundamental controversies within speculative realism is less agreement or disagreement about correlationism as a problem, but instead is a discussion of the feasibility or need of philosophies of phenomenology and cognition after being separated from philosophies of ontology. On this debate, Meillassoux suggest there is no need for phenomenological method while Shaviro, Bennett, and Bogost suggest a separation of anti-correlation of ontology and phenomenology does not render either to be empty philosophical topics. This debate is more fully discussed in The End of Phenomenology by Tom Sparrow, where he outlines a variety of speculative realist styles of thinking on the subject.

Another controversy arises from the contents of some of the oeuvres and their questionable political impacts. For instance, the same Brassier also writes at length about how both anthropomorphism and anthropocentrism are both wrong, and that one should procure means of "anthropo-cide" to promote his own version of nihilism. Therefore, philosophy should become the "organon of extinction" of humanity. Should his ideas find real applicability, many indefensible political decisions would either take place or become even more legitimized.

Another controversy is how important other philosophers are to the movement. For example, Steven Shaviro champions Alfred North Whitehead's process philosophy and speculative philosophy as an anti-correlationist approach to phenomenology. While Meillassoux associates anti-correlationism to "speculative materialism," he does not cite Whitehead in association in the development of After Finitude, and Brassier's statements above suggest he rejects the association. However, between Shaviro, Stengers, and many others, the association of Whitehead is largely consistent with anti-correlationism and thus remains a valuable inspiration. Other philosophical sources that inspire alternative speculative realist commitments are unorthodox readings of Gilles Deleuze and Henri Bergson.

== Notable speculative realists ==
- Ian Bogost
- Levi Bryant
- Drew M. Dalton
- Ray Brassier
- Manuel DeLanda
- Tristan Garcia
- Iain Hamilton Grant
- Graham Harman
- Adrian Johnston
- Katerina Kolozova
- Nick Land
- Quentin Meillassoux
- Reza Negarestani
- Steven Shaviro
- Nick Srnicek
- Isabelle Stengers
- Eugene Thacker

== Publications ==
Speculative realism has close ties to the journal Collapse, which published the proceedings of the inaugural conference at Goldsmiths and has featured numerous other articles by 'Speculative Realist' thinkers; as has the academic journal Pli, which is edited and produced by members of the Graduate School of the Department of Philosophy at the University of Warwick. The journal Speculations, founded in 2010, published by Punctum Books, regularly features articles related to Speculative Realism. Edinburgh University Press publishes a book series called Speculative Realism edited by Graham Harman.

In 2013, the journal Anarchist Developments in Cultural Studies published a special issue on the topic in relation to anarchism.

Between 2019 and 2021, the De Gruyter Open Access journal Open Philosophy published three special issues on object-oriented ontology and its critics.

== Internet presence ==
Speculative realism is notable for its fast expansion via the Internet in the form of blogs. Websites have formed as resources for essays, lectures, and planned future books by those within the speculative realist movement. Many other blogs, as well as podcasts, have emerged with original material on speculative realism or expanding on its themes and ideas.

== See also ==
- Kantian empiricism
- New realism (contemporary philosophy)
- New materialism
- Accelerationism
- Agential realism
- Object-oriented ontology
- Objectivity
- Postanalytic philosophy
- Speculative idealism
- Transhumanism
- Transcendental empiricism
- Transcendental nominalism
