= Iain Hamilton Grant =

British philosopher (born 1963)

- Born: 1963 (age 62–63)

Education
- Education: University of Reading; University of Warwick

Philosophical work
- Era: Contemporary philosophy
- Region: Western philosophy
- School: Continental philosophy Speculative realism (transcendental materialism)
- Institutions: University of the West of England
- Main interests: Naturphilosophie, German idealism, ontology
- Notable ideas: Transcendental materialism

Iain Hamilton Grant (born 1963) is a British philosopher. He is a senior lecturer at the University of the West of England in Bristol. His research interests include ontology, post-Kantian philosophy, German idealism (especially Schelling), and both contemporary and historical philosophy of nature. He is often associated with the recent philosophical current known as speculative realism.

== Work ==
Grant was initially known as a translator of the prominent French philosophers Jean Baudrillard and Jean-François Lyotard. His reputation as an independent philosopher comes primarily from his book On an Artificial Earth. In this book, Grant heavily criticizes the repeated attempts of philosophers to "reverse Platonism," and argues that they should try to reverse Immanuel Kant instead. He is highly critical of the recent prominence of ethics and the philosophy of life in continental philosophy, which in his view merely reinforce the undue privilege of human being. Against these trends, Grant calls for a renewed treatment of the inorganic realm.

Grant views Plato and Friedrich Wilhelm Joseph Schelling as his major allies among classic philosophical figures, and generally opposes both Aristotle and Kant for what he sees as their tendency to reduce reality to its expressibility for humans. Grant is also influenced by the French philosopher Gilles Deleuze.

Grant wrote his PhD thesis on Kant and Lyotard in the Department of Philosophy at Warwick University. Whilst at Warwick, he was part of the Cybernetic Culture Research Unit.

He states "I am a philosopher working on ontology and post-Kantian philosophy and German Idealism, especially Schelling, and on the philosophy of nature both historically and in the contemporary context. I have published widely in these areas, and am writing a monograph on the problem of nature in later Idealism to follow my Philosophies of Nature after Schelling (Continuum, 2006). I maintain an interest in the philosophy of technology and in art."

== Bibliography ==
=== Original works ===
- Co-authored New Media: A Critical Introduction (London and New York: Routledge, 2003).
- Philosophies of Nature After Schelling (London and New York: Continuum, 2006).
- Idealism: The History of a Philosophy (with Jeremy Dunham & Sean Watson) (Durham: Acumen, 2010).
- On The World Soul and Other Naturephilosophical Writings." Translated from the German by Grant, Iain H. New York: State University Press of New York. [Submitted] Available from: http://eprints.uwe.ac.uk/26289.
- Lindner, E., ed. (2016) *Die Natur der Natur. Translated from the English by Lindner, Eckardt. Berlin: Merve. ISBN 9783883963723 Available from: http://eprints.uwe.ac.uk/26287.
- Dunham, J., Grant, I. H. and Watson, S. (2011) *Idealism: The History of a Philosophy. London: Acumen. ISBN 9781844652419 Available from: .

=== English translations ===
- Jean Baudrillard, Symbolic Exchange and Death, transl. Iain Hamilton Grant (London: Sage, 1993).
- Jean-François Lyotard, Libidinal Economy, transl. Iain Hamilton Grant (Bloomington: Indiana University Press, 1993).
