= Ray Brassier =

British philosopher (born August 1965)

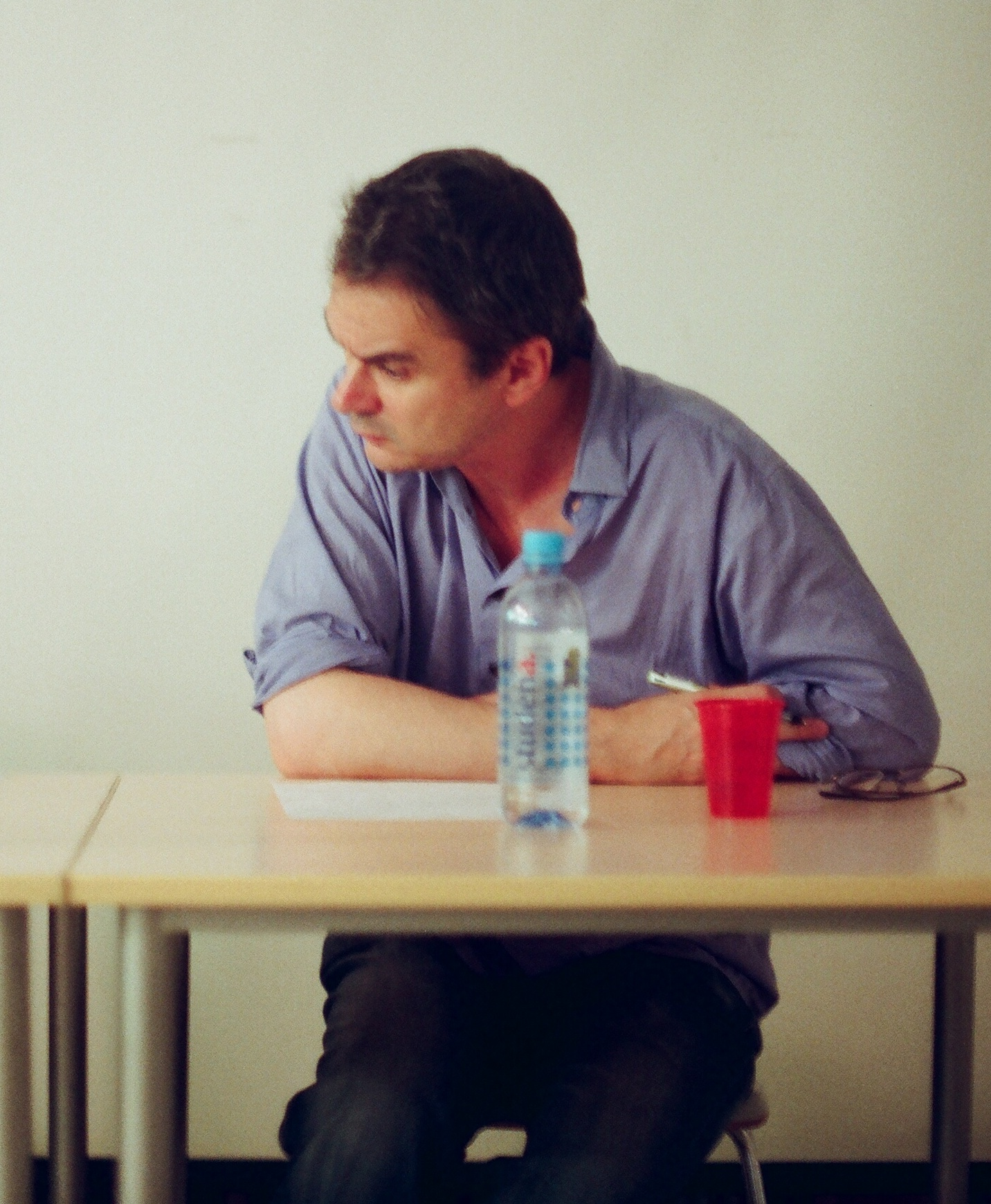
- Born: Raymond Brassier; 1965 (age 60–61); London, England

Education
- Education: University of North London (B.A.); University of Warwick (M.A., PhD)

Philosophical work
- Era: Contemporary philosophy
- Region: Western philosophy
- School: Continental philosophy Speculative realism (transcendental nihilism)
- Institutions: Middlesex University; American University of Beirut
- Main interests: Nihilism, realism, materialism, methodological naturalism, antihumanism, Marxism
- Notable ideas: Transcendental nihilism, philosophy as the "organon of extinction"

Raymond Brassier (/brəˈsɪər/; born 1965) is a British philosopher. He is a member of the philosophy faculty at the American University of Beirut, Lebanon, known for his work in philosophical realism. He was formerly Research Fellow at the Centre for Research in Modern European Philosophy at Middlesex University, London, England.

Brassier is the author of Nihil Unbound: Enlightenment and Extinction and the translator of Alain Badiou's Saint Paul: The Foundation of Universalism and Theoretical Writings and Quentin Meillassoux's After Finitude: An Essay on the Necessity of Contingency. He first attained prominence as a leading authority on the works of François Laruelle.

More recently Brassier has engaged with Marxism and the work of the German-American political theorist Paul Mattick. In August 2024, it was announced that Brassier would be joining Kyung Hee University as a visiting professor in the Department of British & American Language and Culture, and in 2025 teach a masters course on Marxism and literature with the British theorist and filmmaker Jason Barker.

== Education ==
He received a Bachelor of Arts degree from the University of North London in 1995 and Master of Arts and Doctor of Philosophy degrees from the University of Warwick in 1997 and 2001 respectively.

== Philosophical work ==
Along with Quentin Meillassoux, Graham Harman, and Iain Hamilton Grant, Brassier is one of the foremost philosophers of contemporary speculative realism interested in providing a robust defence of philosophical realism in the wake of the challenges posed to it by post-Kantian idealism, phenomenology, postmodernism, deconstruction, or, more broadly speaking, what they refer to as "correlationism". Brassier is generally credited with coining the term speculative realism, though Meillassoux had earlier used the phrase speculative materialism (French: matérialisme spéculatif) to refer to his own position.

Brassier himself, however, does not identify with the speculative realist movement, and, further, disputes that there even is such a movement, stating:

The "speculative realist movement" exists only in the imaginations of a group of bloggers promoting an agenda for which I have no sympathy whatsoever: actor–network theory spiced with pan-psychist metaphysics and morsels of process philosophy. I don't believe the internet is an appropriate medium for serious philosophical debate; nor do I believe it is acceptable to try to concoct a philosophical movement online by using blogs to exploit the misguided enthusiasm of impressionable graduate students. I agree with Deleuze's remark that ultimately the most basic task of philosophy is to impede stupidity, so I see little philosophical merit in a "movement" whose most signal achievement thus far is to have generated an online orgy of stupidity.

Brassier is strongly critical of much of contemporary philosophy for what he regards as its attempt "to stave off the 'threat' of nihilism by safeguarding the experience of meaning – characterized as the defining feature of human existence – from the Enlightenment logic of disenchantment". According to Brassier, this tendency is exemplified above all by philosophers strongly influenced by Heidegger and Wittgenstein. Unlike philosophers such as John McDowell, who would press philosophy into service in an attempt to bring about a "re-enchantment of the world", Brassier's work aims to "push nihilism to its ultimate conclusion".

According to Brassier, "the disenchantment of the world understood as a consequence of the process whereby the Enlightenment shattered the 'great chain of being' and defaced the 'book of the world' is a necessary consequence of the coruscating potency of reason, and hence an invigorating vector of intellectual discovery, rather than a calamitous diminishment". "Philosophy", exhorts Brassier, "would do well to desist from issuing any further injunctions about the need to re-establish the meaningfulness of existence, the purposefulness of life, or mend the shattered concord between man and nature. It should strive to be more than a sop to the pathetic twinge of human self-esteem. Nihilism is not an existential quandary but a speculative opportunity."

Brassier's work attempts to fuse elements of post-war French philosophy with ideas arising from the (largely Anglo-American) traditions of philosophical naturalism, cognitive science, and neurophilosophy. Thus, along with French philosophers such as François Laruelle, Alain Badiou, and Quentin Meillassoux, he is also heavily influenced by the likes of Paul Churchland, Thomas Metzinger and Stephen Jay Gould. He also draws heavily, albeit often negatively, on the work of Gilles Deleuze, Edmund Husserl, and Martin Heidegger.

Brassier's work has often been associated with contemporary philosophies of nihilism and pessimism. In an interview True Detective creator and writer Nic Pizzolatto gave he cited Brassier's Nihil Unbound as an influence on the TV series, along with Thomas Ligotti's The Conspiracy Against the Human Race, Jim Crawford's Confessions of an Antinatalist, Eugene Thacker's In The Dust of This Planet, and David Benatar's Better Never to Have Been.

== Bibliography ==
Books

- Nihil Unbound: Enlightenment and Extinction (London: Palgrave Macmillan, 2007).

Articles

- "Wandering Abstraction." Mute (2014)
- "Transcendental Logic and True Representings." Glass-bead (2016)
- "Dialectics Between Suspicion and Trust." Stasis (2017)
