= University of Warwick =

Public university in Coventry, England

- Coat of arms
- Motto: Latin: Mens agitat molem
- Motto in English: "Mind moves matter"
- Type: Public research university
- Established: 1965; 61 years ago
- Academic affiliations: EUA; The Guild; Midlands Innovation; Russell Group; Universities UK; Defence Universities Alliance
- Endowment: £8.3 million (2025)
- Budget: £859.9 million (2024/25)
- Chancellor: Bience Philomina Gawanas
- Vice-Chancellor: Stuart Croft
- Academic staff: 3,795 (2024/25)
- Administrative staff: 5,020 (2024/25)
- Students: 27,880 (2024/25); 25,685 FTE (2024/25)
- Undergraduates: 19,475 (2024/25)
- Postgraduates: 8,405 (2024/25)
- Location: Coventry, England, UK; 52°22′48″N 1°33′42″W
- Campus: Semi-Urban (West Midlands/Warwickshire), 290 ha (720 acres) The Shard (WBS), London
- Newspapers and magazines: The Boar
Colours
Aubergine
- Website: warwick.ac.uk

The University of Warwick (/ˈwɒrɪk/ WORR-ik; abbreviated as Warw. in post-nominal letters) is a public research university on the outskirts of Coventry between the West Midlands and Warwickshire, England. The university was founded in 1965 as part of a government initiative to expand higher education. Warwick Business School was established in 1967, Warwick Law School in 1968, Warwick Manufacturing Group (WMG) in 1980, and Warwick Medical School in 2000. Warwick incorporated Coventry College of Education in 1979 and Horticulture Research International in 2004.

Warwick is primarily based on a 290-hectare (720-acre) campus on the outskirts of Coventry, with a satellite campus in Wellesbourne and a central London base at the Shard. It is organised into three faculties—Arts; Science, Engineering and Medicine; and Social Sciences—within which there are thirty-two departments. By the end of 2023, the student population was over 28,000 of which over 9,000 are postgraduates. The annual income of the institution for 2024–2025 was £859.9 million, of which £147.5 million was from research grants and contracts, with an expenditure of £828.7 million. Warwick Arts Centre is a multi-venue arts complex in the university's main campus and is the largest venue of its kind in the UK outside of London.

In 2024, Warwick ranked tenth nationally for undergraduate education. Warwick is a member of AACSB, the Association of Commonwealth Universities, the Association of MBAs, EQUIS, the European University Association, the Midlands Innovation group, the Russell Group, Sutton 13 and Universities UK. It is the only European member of the Center for Urban Science and Progress, a collaboration with New York University. The university has extensive commercial activities, including the University of Warwick Science Park and WMG, University of Warwick.

Warwick's alumni and staff include winners of the Nobel Prize, Turing Award, Fields Medal, Richard W. Hamming Medal, Emmy Award, Grammy, and the Padma Vibhushan, and are fellows to the British Academy, the Royal Society of Literature, the Royal Academy of Engineering, and the Royal Society. Alumni also include heads of state, government officials, leaders in intergovernmental organisations, and a former chief economist at the Bank of England. Researchers at Warwick have also made significant contributions such as the development of penicillin, music therapy, the Washington Consensus, computing standards, including ISO and ECMA, complexity theory, contract theory, and the International Political Economy as a field of study. Warwick is also known for being the center of the experimental cultural theorist collective Cybernetic Culture Research Unit, which had significant influence on computer science, philosophy, occultism, and the cyberpunk genre.

== History ==
=== Twentieth century ===
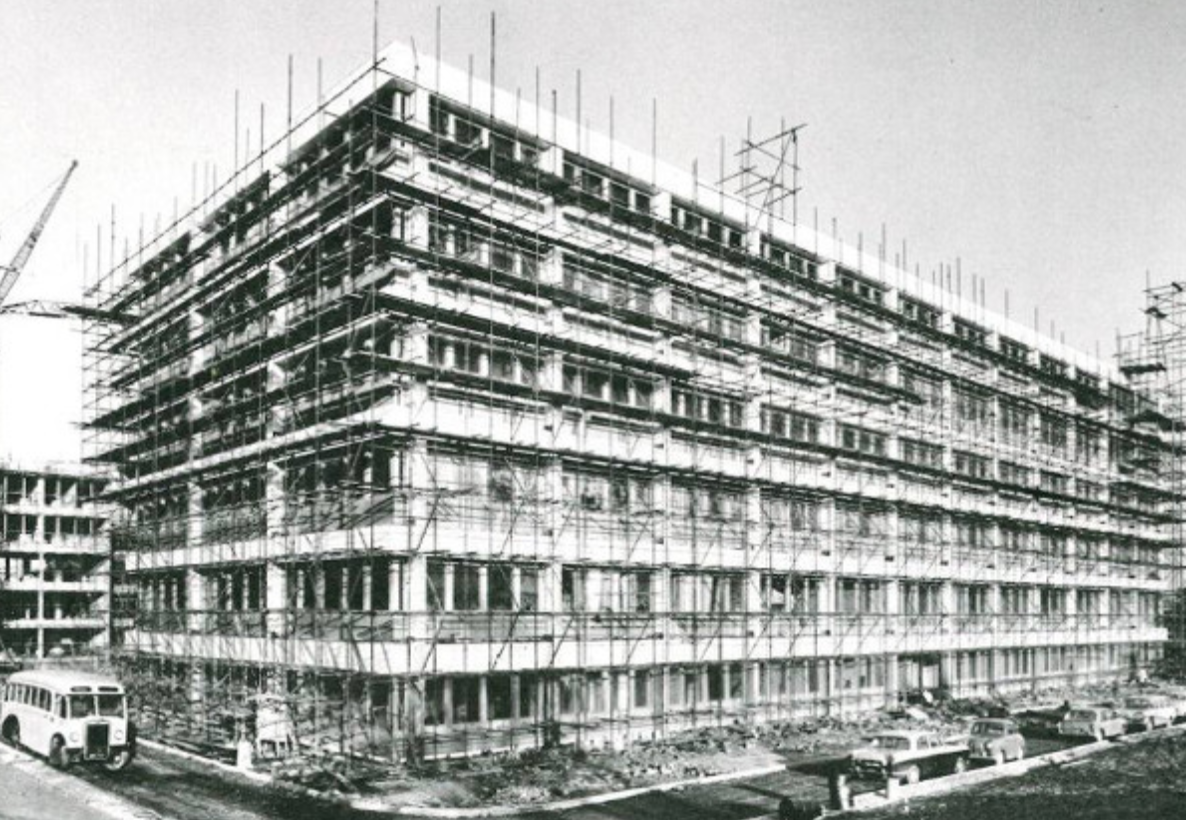
Library under construction in the 1960s

The idea for a university in Warwickshire was first mooted shortly after World War II, although it was not founded for a further two decades. A partnership of the city and county councils ultimately provided the impetus for the university to be established on a 400-acre (1.6 km^{2}) site jointly granted by the two authorities. There was some discussion between local sponsors from both the city and county over whether it should be named after Coventry or Warwickshire. The name "University of Warwick" was adopted, even though Warwick, the county town, lies some 8 miles (13 km) to its southwest and Coventry's city centre is only 3.5 miles (5.6 km) northeast of the campus. The establishment of the University of Warwick was given approval by the government in 1961 and it received its Royal Charter of Incorporation in 1965. Since then, the university has incorporated the former Coventry College of Education in 1979 and has extended its land holdings by the continuing purchase of adjoining farm land. The university also benefited from a substantial donation from the family of John Martin, a Coventry businessman who had made a fortune from investment in Smirnoff vodka, and which enabled the construction of the Warwick Arts Centre.

The university admitted its first, small intake of graduate students in 1964, and took its first 450 undergraduates in October 1965. Since its establishment Warwick has expanded its grounds to 721 acres (2.9 km^{2}), with many modern buildings and academic facilities, lakes, and woodlands. In the 1960s and 1970s, Warwick had a reputation as a politically radical institution. Under Vice-Chancellor Lord Butterworth, Warwick was the first UK university to adopt a business approach to higher education, develop close links with the business community and exploit the commercial value of its research. These tendencies were discussed by British historian and then-Warwick lecturer, E. P. Thompson, in his 1970 edited book Warwick University Ltd.. The Leicester Warwick Medical School, a new medical school based jointly at Warwick and Leicester University, opened in September 2000.

On the recommendation of then-Prime Minister Tony Blair, Bill Clinton chose Warwick as the venue for his last major foreign policy address as US President in December 2000. Sandy Berger, Clinton's National Security Advisor, explaining the decision in a press briefing on 7 December 2000, said that: "Warwick is one of Britain's newest and finest research universities, singled out by Prime Minister Blair as a model both of academic excellence and independence from the government."

=== Twenty-first century ===
The university was seen as a favoured institution of the Labour government during the New Labour years from 1997 to 2010. It was academic partner for a number of flagship Government schemes including the National Academy for Gifted and Talented Youth and the NHS University which is now defunct. Tony Blair described Warwick as "a beacon among British universities for its dynamism, quality and entrepreneurial zeal". In a 2012 study by Virgin Media Business, Warwick was described as the most "digitally-savvy" UK university.

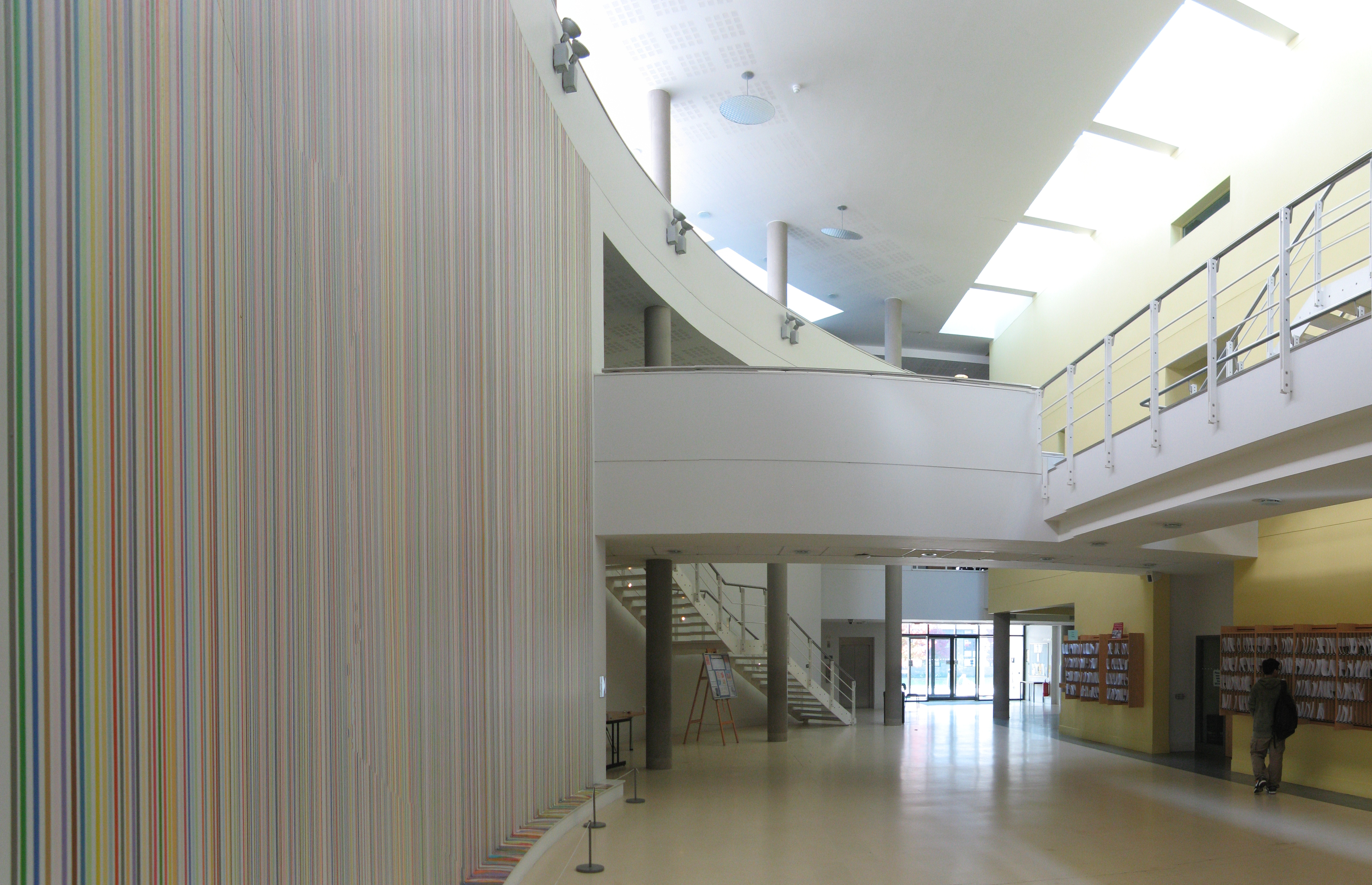
Ian Davenport's Everything (2004) in the Warwick Mathematics Institute

In February 2001, IBM donated a new S/390 computer and software worth £2 million to Warwick, to form part of a "Grid" enabling users to remotely share computing power. In April 2004 Warwick merged with the Wellesbourne and Kirton sites of Horticulture Research International. In July 2004 Warwick was the location for an important agreement between the Labour Party and the trade unions on Labour policy and trade union law, which has subsequently become known as the "Warwick Agreement".

In June 2006, the new University Hospital Coventry opened, including a 102,000 sq ft (9,500 m^{2}) university clinical sciences building. Warwick Medical School was granted independent degree-awarding status in 2007, and the School's partnership with the University of Leicester was dissolved in the same year. In February 2010, Lord Bhattacharyya, director and founder of the WMG unit at Warwick, made a £1 million donation to the university to support science grants and awards.

In February 2012, Warwick and Melbourne-based Monash University announced the formation of a strategic partnership, including the creation of ten joint senior academic posts, new dual master's and joint doctoral degrees, and co-ordination of research programmes. In March 2012, Warwick and Queen Mary, University of London announced the creation of a strategic partnership, including research collaboration, some joint teaching of English, history and computer science undergraduates, and the creation of eight joint post-doctoral research fellowships.

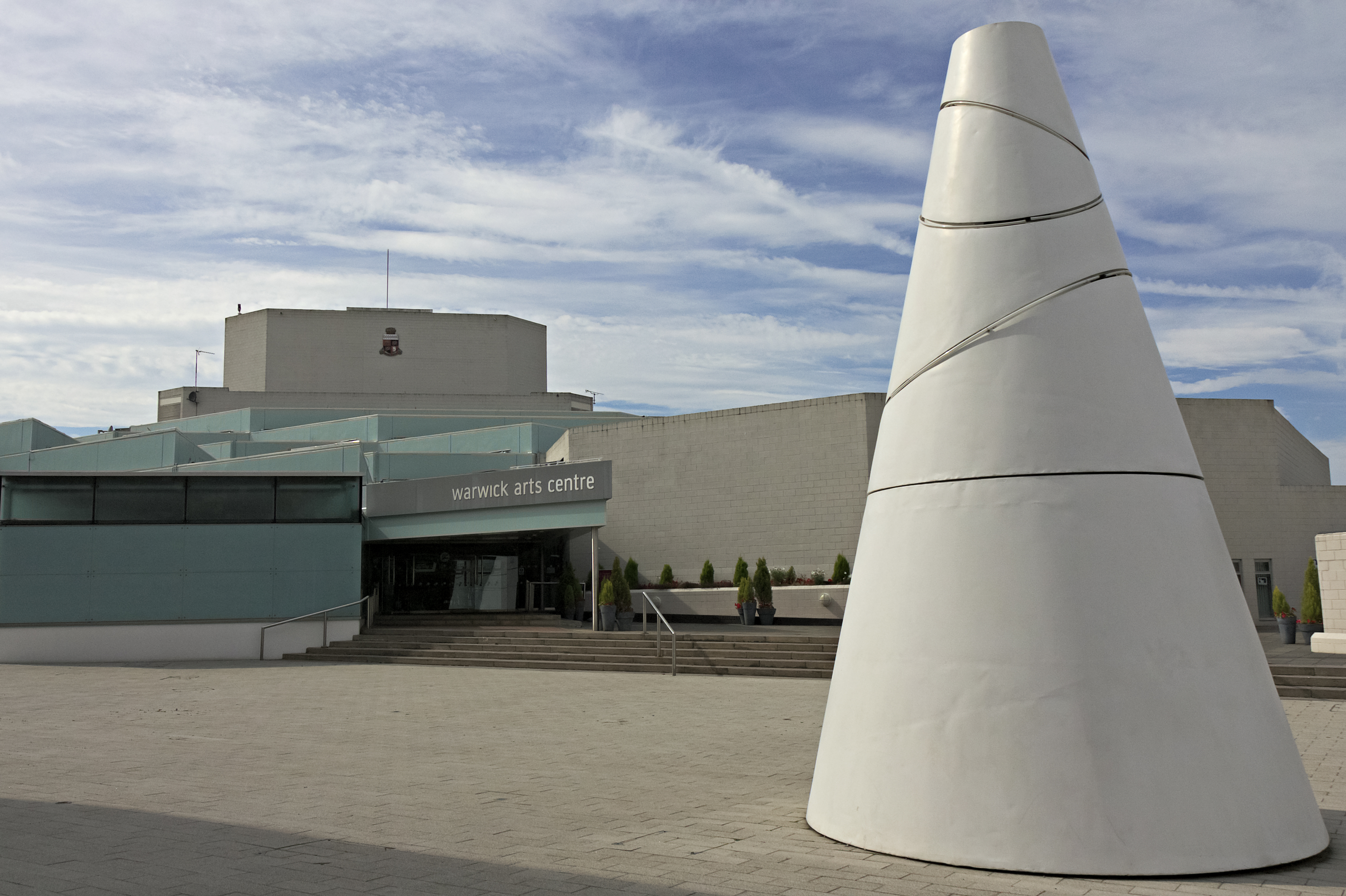
Warwick Arts Centre (c. 2012), with White Koan (1971) by Liliane Lijn in the foreground

In April 2012, it was announced that Warwick would be the only European university participating in the Center for Urban Science and Progress, an applied science research institute to be based in New York consisting of an international consortium of universities and technology companies led by New York University and NYU-Poly. In August 2012, Warwick and five other Midlands-based universities—Aston University, the University of Birmingham, the University of Leicester, Loughborough University and the University of Nottingham—formed the M5 Group, a regional bloc intended to maximise the member institutions' research income and enable closer collaboration.

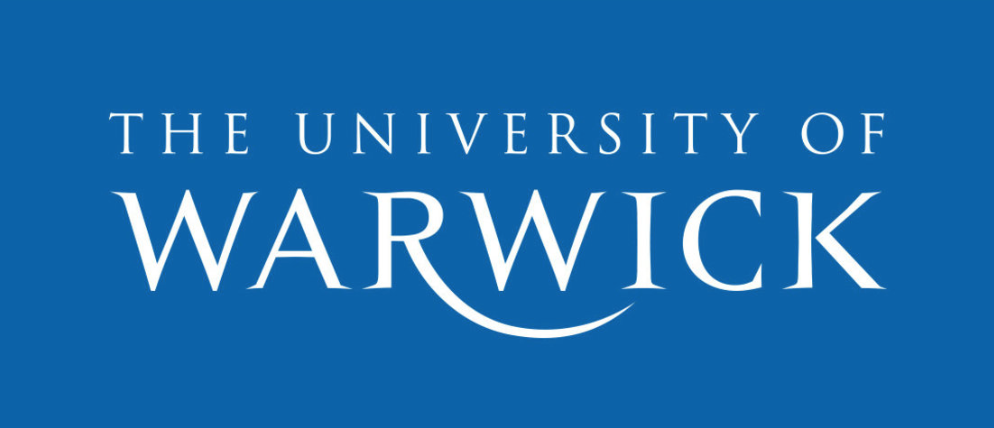
Warwick logo before introduction of the current logo in 2015

In September 2013, it was announced that a new National Automotive Innovation Centre would be built by WMG at Warwick's main campus at a cost of £100 million, with £50 million to be contributed by Jaguar Land Rover and £30 million by Tata Motors. The centre will open in Summer 2018. The building was opened by HRH The Prince of Wales on 18 February 2020.

In July 2014, the government announced that Warwick would be the host for the £1 billion Advanced Propulsion Centre (APC), a non-profit organization that facilitates funding to UK-based research and development projects developing low-carbon emission powertrain technologies. The APC manages a £1 billion investment fund, which is jointly supplied by the automotive industry – via the Automotive Council – and the UK government through the Department for Business and Trade and managed by Innovate UK.

In September 2015, Warwick celebrated its 50th anniversary and was designated "University of the Year" by The Times and The Sunday Times. In December 2017, the university announced it would not continue with a project to open a Campus in Roseville, California. The university had spent £1.2 million on the project.

In 2019, Warwick entered into the EUTOPIA alliance (European Universities Transforming into an Open Inclusive Academy), a coalition of 10 European universities and 6 global partners. The EUTOPIA project is co-funded by the European Commission through its Erasmus+ European Universities Initiative; Warwick is the only non-EU member, and at the time of its inclusion was one of the first UK universities to re-enter into European partnerships post-Brexit.

In 2023, the students' union voted for all the union-run catering to offer all plant-based meals. The vote was supported in order to reduce climate change emissions. According to plan, by the following academic year, the menus would be 50% vegan and then would be fully plant-based by 2027. It was the eighth student union at a U.K. university to adopt plant-based catering. Only 4,5% or 1,472 students out of 28,621 voted in ballot, among whom 772 voted in favour of plan. In 2024 this decision was revoked by students' union trustees due to "practical and financial challenges involved with such a significant transition".

== Campus ==
Warwick is located on the outskirts of Coventry, 3.4 mi (5.5 km) southwest of the city centre and not in the town of Warwick as its name suggests. The university's main site comprises three contiguous campuses, all within walking distance of each other. The university also owns a site in Wellesbourne, acquired in 2004 when it merged with Horticulture Research International.

=== Main campus ===
The main Warwick campus occupies 710 acres (2.88 km^{2}) between the City of Coventry and the County of Warwickshire. The original buildings of the campus are in contemporary 1960s architecture. The campus contains all of the main student amenities, all but four of the student halls of residence, and the Students' Union. The campus is split between the parliamentary constituencies of Kenilworth and Southam and Coventry South.

==== Warwick Arts Centre ====
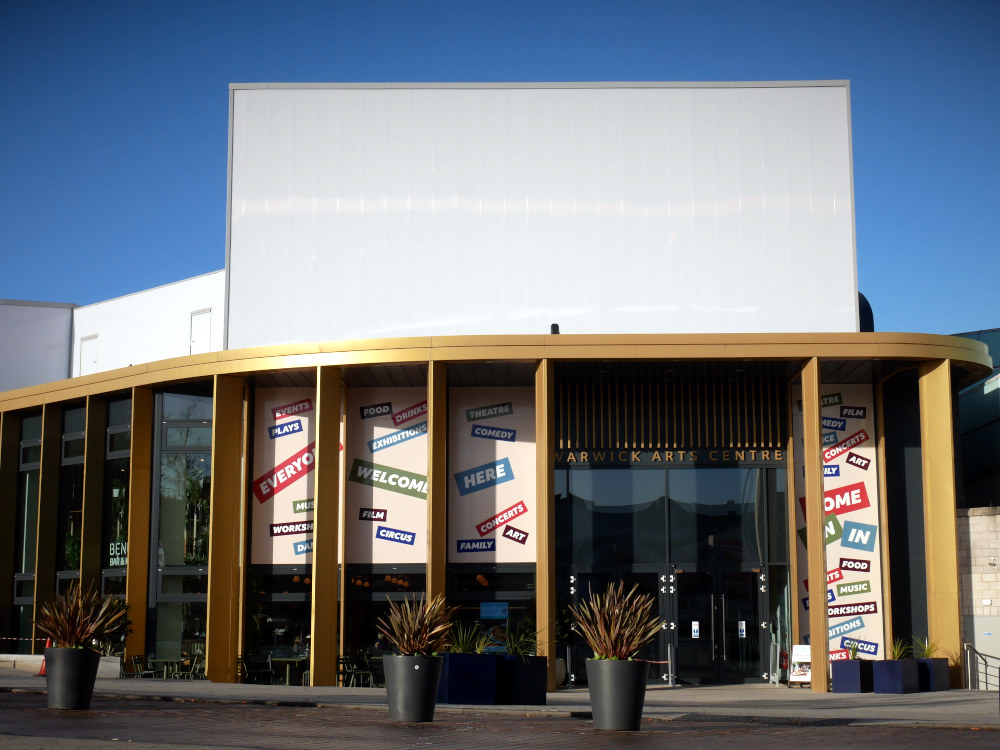
Warwick Arts Centre – main entrance (c. December 2022)

The Warwick Arts Centre is a multi-venue arts complex situated at the centre of Warwick's main campus. It attracts around 300,000 visitors a year to over 3,000 individual events spanning contemporary and classical music, drama, dance, comedy, films and visual art. The centre comprises six principal spaces: the Butterworth Hall, a 1,500-seat concert hall; a 550-seat theatre; a 180-seat theatre studio; three cinema screens; the Mead Gallery, an art gallery; and the Music Centre, with practice rooms, and an ensemble rehearsal room where music societies and groups can rehearse. In addition the site includes a restaurant/ café.

==== University House ====
In 2003, Warwick acquired the former headquarters of National Grid, which it converted into an administration building renamed University House. There is a student-run facility called the ‘Learning Grid’ in the building, which includes two floors of PC clusters, scanners, photocopiers, a reference library, interactive whiteboards and plasma screens for use by individuals and for group work.

==== Koan ====
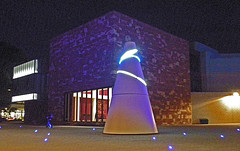
The Koan in front of the Helen Martin Arts Studio

The White Koan is a modern art sculpture by Liliane Lijn which is installed outside the back entrance to the Warwick Arts Centre. The Koan is 6 metres (20 ft) high, white in colour, decorated with elliptical of fluorescent lights and is rotated by an electric motor whilst illuminated. It is intended to represent the Buddhist quest for questions without answers, the Kōan. The Koan was made in 1971 as part of the Peter Stuyvesant Foundation City Sculpture Project and was originally sited in Plymouth; it moved to the Hayward Gallery in London before being purchased by Warwick in 1972.

The Koan was temporarily relocated to the university's Gibbet Hill campus during refurbishments to the Warwick Arts Centre; it was returned upon completion of the project. According to student newspaper The Boar, the white Koan has played a role in many of campus' myths and legends – it was allegedly the nose-cap of the Blue-Streak Missile, a supposed quick escape route for senior staff, and even a signalling device for aliens in outer space. The Koan even garnered its own cartoon strip in the 1990s, with thirty-two episodes created by Steve Shipway. The Koan Worshipping Society, led by the Koanists, believe the Koan is “the earth-bound manifestation of the immortal Koan, the creator of the universe”.

==== Sports facilities ====
In April 2019, the university opened a new £49 million Sports and Wellness Hub, on the main campus, featuring two sports halls with arena style balcony, the largest gym in the Higher education sector, a 12-lane 25 metre pool with movable floor, climbing and bouldering walls, squash courts, studio spaces and a café. The previous main sports centre was closed on 7 April 2019.

Elsewhere on campus is another sports hall, a £2.5 million 4-court indoor tennis centre with floodlit outdoor courts, a 400 m athletics track, multi-purpose outdoor surfaces, and over 60 acres (20 ha) of outdoor playing fields, including a football pitch and cricket grounds. Warwick was an official training venue for the London 2012 Olympics. During the Games, some football matches were played at the nearby Ricoh Arena, home at the time to Coventry City Football Club, and Warwick provided training and residential facilities for the Olympic teams.

==== Esports facilities ====
In September 2021, Warwick opened its esports centre in the new Junction building on central campus, marking it as the first esports facility opened in a Russell Group university and also the first university esports facility to be opened in the UK that is not tied to a degree. The centre is equipped with 24 PCs, and is designed to be easily configurable and moveable to facilitate the hosting of larger scale events. The centre is open to all of the public, not just students of the university, and this is all only part of "Phase 1" of a larger push from the university to invest in esports. The centre is sponsored by Uninn and Coventry City Football Club, partnered with Sky Blues in the Community, Women in Games and Special Effect and has its tech supplied by Chillblast and HyperX.

=== Other sites ===
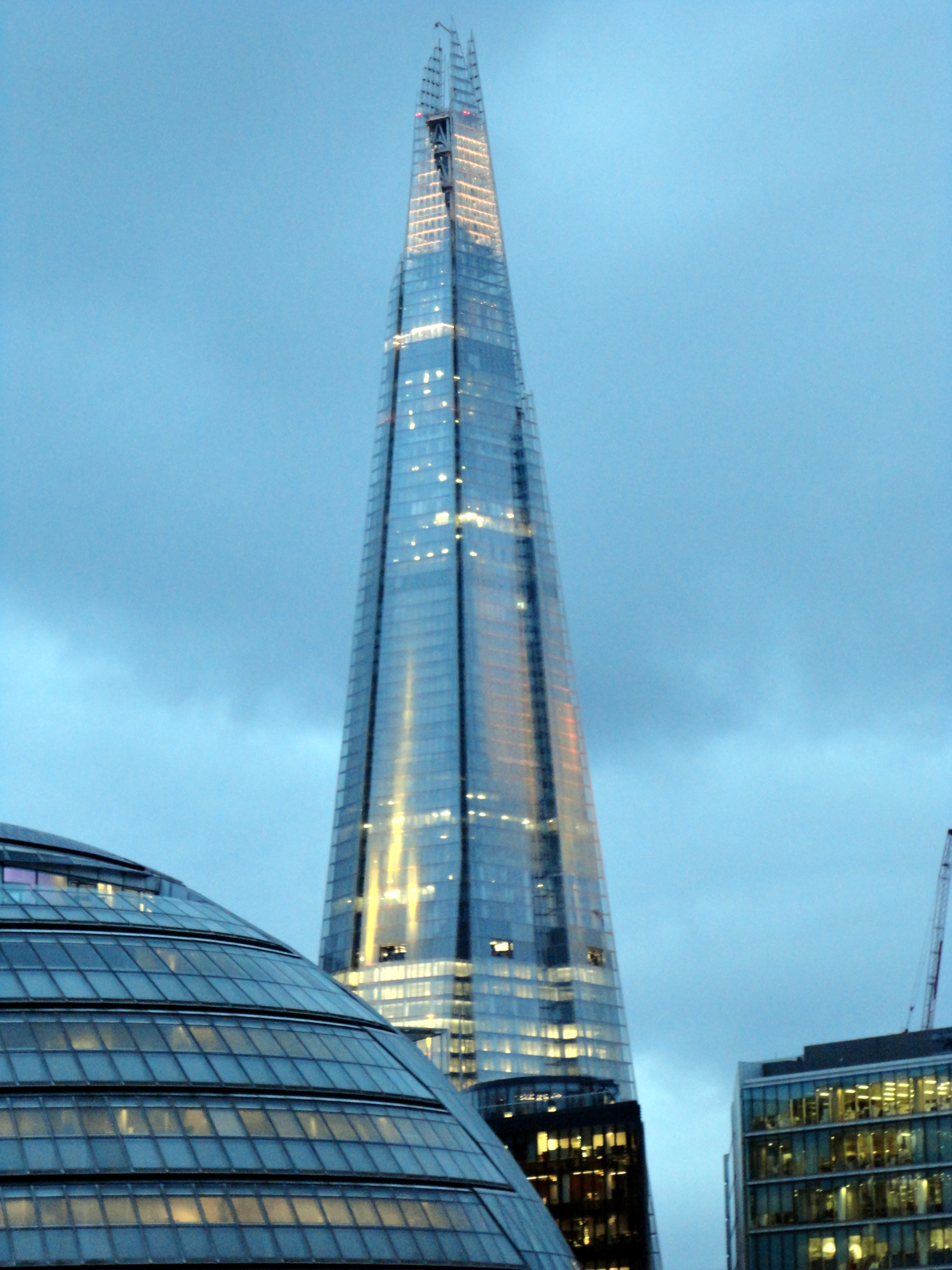
The Shard, where WBS houses its London campus

Other Warwick sites include:

- The Gibbet Hill Campus, located contiguous to the main campus; home to the department of Life Sciences and the pre-clinical activities of Warwick Medical School.
- The Westwood Campus, located contiguous to the main campus; home to the Centre for Professional Education, Centre for Lifelong Learning, the Arden House conference centre, an indoor tennis centre, a running track and some postgraduate facilities and student residences.
- The University of Warwick Science Park.
- University Hospital Coventry, in Walsgrave on Sowe area and home to the Clinical Sciences Building of the medical school.
- Warwick Horticulture Research International Research & Conference Centre, located in Wellesbourne, Warwickshire.
- The Shard skyscraper, in the city of London, houses Warwick Business School's metropolitan campus where the Executive MBA is taught.

=== Recent developments ===
In November 2005, Warwick outlined proposals for how it would like to develop its campus over the next fifteen years. The proposals built upon recent construction activity including a new Mathematics and Statistics Building, new Computer Science Building, new Business School buildings, a Digital Laboratory, new Residences and an expanded Sports Centre. The proposals envisage a shift in the "centre of gravity" of the campus away from the Students' Union towards University House and a proposed "Academic Square".

Developed projects included an inter-disciplinary biosciences research facility; a £25 million upgrade to Warwick Business School; and the National Automotive Innovation Campus (NAIC), a new £150 million venture funded by Jaguar Land Rover and the UK government. The NAIC's purpose was to research and develop novel technologies to reduce dependency on fossil fuels and to reduce CO_{2} emissions. The new 30,000 sq ft (2,800 m^{2}) campus for postgraduates was opened in early-2020. The campus has been dubbed a "brain trust" and is intended to pioneer the green and high-tech sports and luxury cars of tomorrow, doubling the size of Jaguar's research team.

In 2017, the university announced its intention to see an exponential growth of its main campus in order to remain "world-class" and cope with the growing number of applications it receives each year, especially from non-UK students. This growth included a new £33 million Faculty of Arts, a £55 million new sports centre which was finished in April 2019, a new £54.3 million Interdisciplinary Biomedical Research Building (IBRB), a new type of student accommodation called "Cryfield Village", the expansion of Warwick Manufacturing Group (WMG), a redevelopment for the Art centre and a new Library. For this occasion, Vice-Chancellor of Warwick University Stuart Croft declared: "New buildings are and will continue to be a part of our everyday existence. We need to open one new academic building a year from now until at least 2023. In order to do this and to keep Warwick as one of the world’s leading universities, we need to do this together, involving the whole community."

== Organisation and administration ==
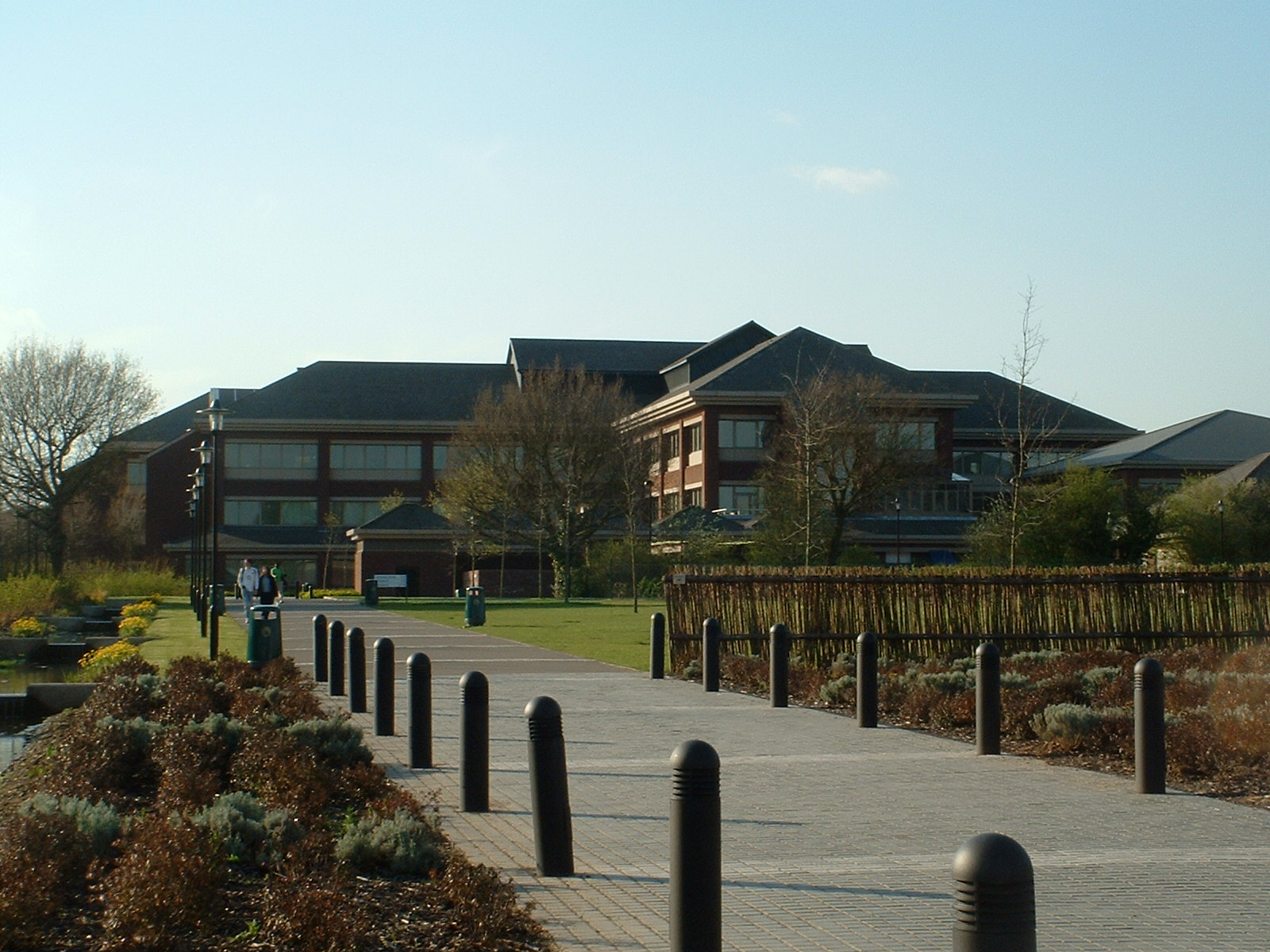
University House

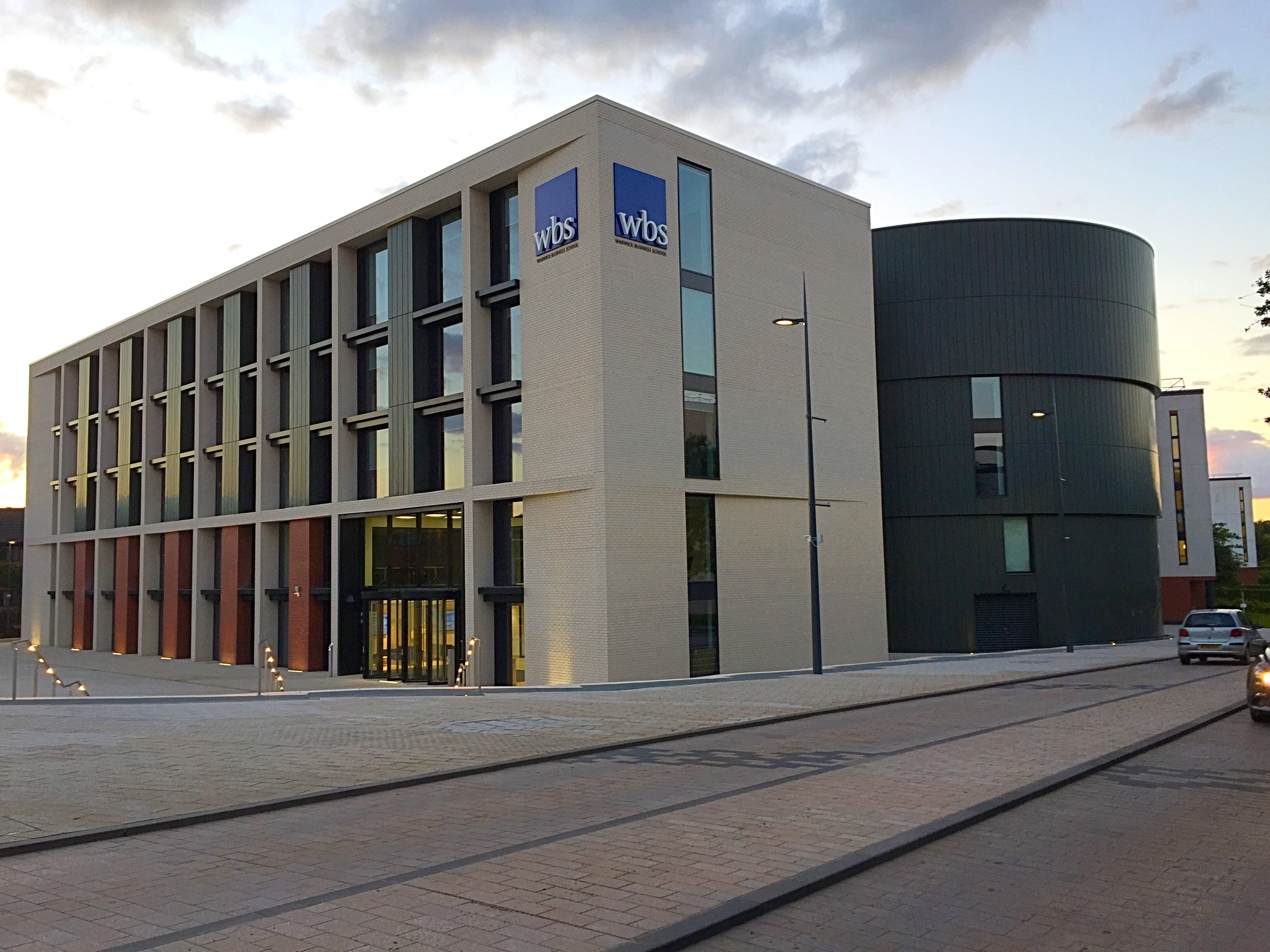
Warwick Business School

Warwick is governed by two formal bodies: the Council and the Senate. In addition to these, a steering committee provide strategic leadership in between meetings of the formal bodies. Faculties are overseen by faculty boards which report to the Senate. The principal officers of the university have responsibility for day-to-day operations of the university. These include the registrar, the University secretary, the group finance director, the director of commercial, the chief information and transformation officer, and the chief communications officer. The latter two roles were created after it emerged that the current registrar, Rachel Sandby-Thomas, had failed in her duty as the then data protection officer to notify staff, students, and partners of a series of significant breaches.

=== Faculties and departments ===
Warwick's academic activities are organised into the following faculties and departments:

Faculty of Arts	Faculty of Science, Engineering, and Medicine	Faculty of Social Sciences
Classics and Ancient History; Comparative American Studies; English and Comparative Literary Studies; Film and Television Studies; History; History of Art; School of Modern Languages and Cultures; Theatre Studies	Chemistry; Computer Science; Engineering; Life Sciences; Mathematics; Warwick Medical School; Physics; Psychology; Statistics; WMG	Applied Linguistics; Centre for Lifelong Learning; Economics; Education; Health and Social Studies; Law; Philosophy; Politics and International Studies; Sociology; Warwick Business School

=== Finances ===
In the financial year ending 31 July 2024, the University of Warwick had a total income of £850.5 million (2022/23 – £828.2 million) and total expenditure of £559.6 million (2022/23 – £722.1 million). Key sources of income included £459.6 million from tuition fees and education contracts (2022/23 – £453.8 million), £74.1 million from funding body grants (2022/23 – £74.4 million), £146.5 million from research grants and contracts (2022/23 – £144.1 million), £24 million from investment income (2022/23 – £14.5 million) and £4.5 million from donations and endowments (2022/23 – £3.9 million).

At year end, Warwick had endowments of £7.3 million (2023 – £6.7 million) and total net assets of £733.3 million (2023 – £444.7 million).

=== Coat of arms ===
Warwick's coat of arms depicts atoms of two isotopes of lithium, a DNA helix to represent science and also the Bear and Ragged Staff, historically associated with Warwickshire and previously the Earls of Warwick as well as the Elephant and Castle of Coventry. The Bear is not chained in the current depiction of the university's coat of arms, although it had been in its original grant of Letters Patent by the College of Arms.

== Academic profile ==
In 2024/25, Warwick's student body consisted of 27,880 students, composed of 19,475 undergraduates and 8,405 postgraduate students. About 43% of the student body comes from outside the UK and over 120 countries are represented on the campus. The university has twenty-nine academic departments and over forty research centres and institutes, in three faculties: Arts, Science Technology Engineering and Mathematics (STEM), and Social Sciences. There were 2,492 academic and research staff in October 2018.

=== International partnerships ===
Warwick students can study abroad for a semester or a year and may obtain a double degree. International partners include Columbia University, University of Waterloo, McGill University, Cornell University, UC Berkeley, Sciences Po Paris, and the Balsillie School of International Affairs.

=== Rankings and reputation ===
Rankings
National rankings
- Complete (2027): 7
- Guardian (2027): 7
- Times / Sunday Times (2027): 7

Global rankings
- ARWU (2026): 101–150
- QS (2027): 68=
- THE (2026): 122=

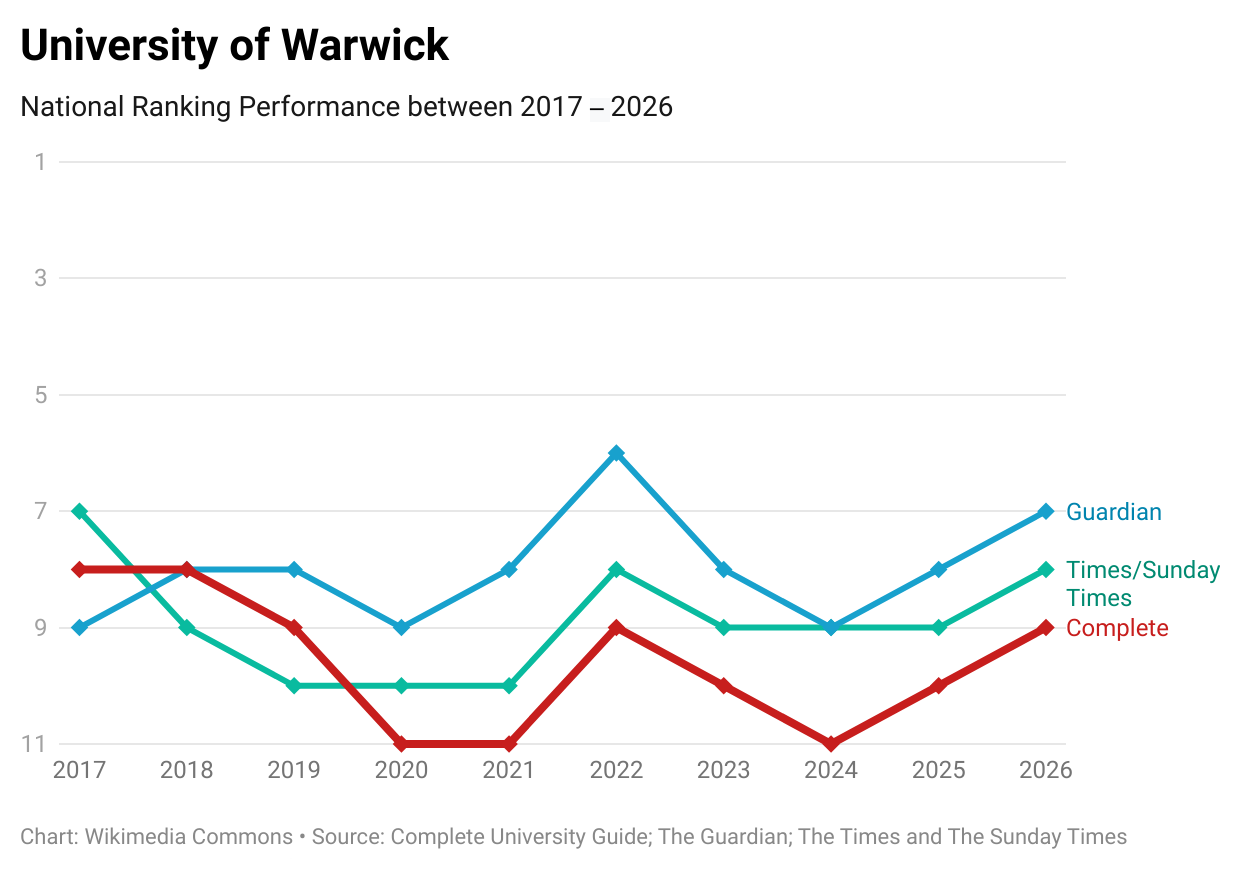
University of Warwick's national league table performance over the past ten years

Warwick has a number of subjects within the 2022 ARWU's global top 50:

- 20th in Mathematics
- 22nd in Management
- 29th in Economics
- 31st in Statistics
- 41st in Political Sciences
- 50th in Sociology

In broad subject rankings, Warwick is ranked 36th globally for Social Sciences, 42nd for Humanities, and 78th for Natural Sciences, 164th for Engineering and Technology, and 204th for Life Sciences and Medicine according to the 2020 QS World University Rankings.

The Times Higher Education rankings has ranked six out of eleven subjects at Warwick within the global top 100 in 2020:

- 4th in Teaching Rankings
- 26th in Economics and Business
- 51st in Arts and Humanities
- 64th in Law
- 81st in Physical Sciences
- 81st in Social Sciences
- 85th in Psychology

Warwick's Economics department and Politics and International Studies (PAIS) department were ranked 1st in the UK by the Good University Guide 2020 ahead of Oxbridge. The Mathematics department was ranked 10th in the world (3rd in the UK) in 2019 by Academic Ranking of World Universities and 19th in the world (4th in the UK) in 2020 by QS. The Guardian University Guide ranks Warwick Business School (WBS) second only after Oxford's Saïd Business School in Business and Management in 2014. The 2020 QS World University Rankings ranked WBS 4th in the UK and 23rd globally. However, Law and Legal Studies at Warwick has dropped from 36th globally in 2013 to 51–100th in 2020.

Warwick is consistently ranked amongst the top ten in the three major national rankings of British universities. Warwick is a member of the 'Sutton 13' of top ranked universities in the UK. Warwick was declared as The Times and The Sunday Times "University of the Year" 2015. Overall, nineteen of the twenty-seven subjects offered by Warwick were ranked within the top 10 nationally in 2019 by the Complete University Guide. In 2017, Warwick was named as the university with the joint second highest graduate employment rate of any UK university, with 97.7% of its graduates in work or further study three and a half years after graduation.

=== Admissions ===
UCAS Admission Statistics
	2025	2024	2023	2022	2021
Applications (Note: Main scheme applications, International and UK)	46,280	45,100	47,130	43,735	42,260
Accepted	7,355	6,045	5,825	5,735	6,000
Applications/Accepted Ratio	6.3	7.5	8.1	7.6	7.0
Overall Offer Rate (%)	78.6	71.7	63.5	60.9	67.9
↳ UK only (%) (Note: UK domiciled applicants)	76.9	70.8	62.7	62.0	65.1
Average Entry Tariff	—N/a	—N/a	171	168	173
↳ Top three exams (Note: The maximum tariff score for three exams is 168: the equivalent of A*A*A* at A-Level, 777 at HL for the IB Diploma Programme, or AAA at Advanced Higher)	—N/a	—N/a	153.3	155.4	157.3

HESA Student Body Composition (2024/25)
Domicile and Ethnicity	Total
British White (Note: Not be confused solely with White British)	38%
British Ethnic Minorities (Note: Includes those who indicate that they identify as Asian, Black, Mixed Heritage, Arab or any other ethnicity except White.)	28%
International EU	4%
International Non-EU	30%
Undergraduate Widening Participation Indicators
Female	50%
Independent School	21%
Low Participation Areas (Note: Calculated from the Polar4 measure, using Quintile1, in England and Wales. Calculated from the Scottish Index of Multiple Deprivation (SIMD) measure, using SIMD20, in Scotland.)	7%

In the 2024/25 academic year, the student body consisted of 27,880 students, composed of 19,475 undergraduates and 8,405 postgraduate students. The university is consistently designated as a 'high-tariff' institution by the Department for Education, with the average undergraduate entrant to the university in recent years amassing between 153–157 UCAS Tariff points in their top three pre-university qualifications – the equivalent of A*AA to A*A*A at A-Level. Based on 2022/23 HESA entry standards data published in domestic league tables, which include a broad range of qualifications beyond the top three exam grades, the average student at the University of Warwick achieved 168 points – the 18th highest in the country. The university gave offers of admission to 62% of its undergraduate applicants in 2022, the 34th lowest offer rate across the country. For 2017 entry, the university was one of only a few mainstream universities (along with Cambridge, Imperial College, LSE, Oxford, St Andrews, and UCL) to have no courses available in Clearing.

22% of Warwick's undergraduates are privately educated, the fifteenth highest proportion amongst mainstream British universities. In the 2016–17 academic year, the university had a domicile breakdown of 66:9:25 of UK:EU:non-EU students respectively with a female to male ratio of 50:50.

=== Library ===
The main university library is located in the middle of the main campus. It houses approximately 1,265,000 books and over 13 kilometres of archives and manuscripts. The main library houses services to support Research and Teaching practice and collaboration between departments. The Wolfson Research Exchange opened in October 2008 and provides collaboration spaces, seminar rooms, conference facilities and study areas for Postgraduate Research students. The Teaching Grid, which opened in 2008, is a flexible space which allows teaching staff to try out new technologies and techniques. Adjacent to the main library building is the Modern Records Centre, a sizeable archive collection, including the UK's largest industrial relations collection.

=== CCRU ===
The Cybernetic Culture Research Unit (CCRU, sometimes typeset Ccru) was an experimental cultural theorist collective formed in late 1995 at Warwick University, England which gradually separated from academia until it dissolved in the early 2000s. It garnered reputation for its idiosyncratic and surreal "theory-fiction" which incorporated philosophy, cyberpunk, and occultism, and its work has since had an online cult following related to the rise in popularity of accelerationism.

The CCRU are strongly associated with former leading members Sadie Plant, Mark Fisher and Nick Land. Established at the University of Warwick philosophy department, the group listed their interests as "cinema, complexity, currencies, dance music, e-cash, encryption, feminism, fiction, images, inorganic life, jungle, markets, matrices, microbiotics, multimedia, networks, numbers, perception, replication, sex, simulation, sound, telecommunications, textiles, texts, trade, video, virtuality, war". Iain Hamilton Grant notes Neuromancer as particularly influential to the group's formation. In addition to drawing inspiration from Gilles Deleuze and Félix Guattari's Anti-Oedipus and A Thousand Plateaus, to which references can be found in the CCRU's writings, the collective drew inspiration from writers including H. P. Lovecraft, William Gibson, J. G. Ballard, Friedrich Nietzsche, Octavia Butler, William S. Burroughs, Carl Jung. Fisher described the CCRU's work as "a kind of exuberant anti-politics, a 'technihilo' celebration of the irrelevance of human agency, partly inspired by the pro-markets, anti-capitalism line developed by Manuel DeLanda out of Braudel, and from the section of Anti-Oedipus that talks about marketization as the 'revolutionary path.'" Their later work drew upon occultism, esotericism, numerology, and the work of Lovecraft and Aleister Crowley.

Roc Jiménez de Cisneros considers the CCRU's work to be influential on the development of speculative realism, while Fisher considered speculative realism to be returning to the CCRU's areas of interest in 2010. In 2017, the CCRU was labeled by The Guardian as influential in computer science, philosophy, occultism, and cyberpunk, and credited with the creation of accelerationism.

== Research ==
In 2013, Warwick had a total research income of £90.1 million, of which £33.9 million was from Research Councils; £25.9 million was from central government, local authorities and public corporations; £12.7 million was from the European Union; £7.9 million was from UK industry and commerce; £5.2 million was from UK charitable bodies; £4.0 million was from overseas sources; and £0.5 million was from other sources. In the 2014 UK Research Excellence Framework (REF), Warwick was again ranked 7th overall amongst multi-faculty institutions and was the top-ranked university in the Midlands. 87% of the university's academic staff were rated as being in "world-leading" or "internationally excellent" departments with top research ratings of 4* or 3*.

Warwick is particularly strong in the areas of decision sciences research including economics, finance, management, mathematics and statistics. For instance, researchers of Warwick Business School have won the highest prize of the prestigious European Case Clearing House. Warwick has also established a number of stand-alone units to manage and extract commercial value from its research activities. The four most prominent examples of these units are University of Warwick Science Park; Warwick HRI; Warwick Ventures; and WMG.

=== Commercial focus ===
Warwick's administration has received criticism for being too aligned with business interests, at the expense of the rights and interests of students and staff. The most famous proponent of this critique was the noted historian E. P. Thompson, who edited and wrote much of Warwick University Ltd in 1971. The book focuses on the debate over proposals for a social building, the brief student occupation of the Registry in 1967, and the files on surveillance of student and staff that this discovered and published.

Nevertheless, with the appointment of Sir Nicholas Scheele as Chancellor in 2002, the university signalled that it intended to continue and expand its commercial activities. In an interview for the BBC, Scheele said: "I think in the future, education and industry need to become even more closely linked than they have been historically. As government funding changes, the replacement could well come through private funding from companies, individuals and grant-giving agencies."

== Student life ==
The university has a campus cat named Rolf.

=== Students' Union ===
The University of Warwick Students' Union is one of the largest students' unions in the UK, with over 260 societies and 67 sports clubs including basketball, rowing and ice hockey. The Union has an annual turnover of approximately £6 million, the profit from which is used to provide services to students and to employ its staff and sabbatical officers. The Union is divided into two buildings—SUHQ and The Union Building. The Union Building contains a three-room club venue known as "The Copper Rooms"; CAMRA-accredited "The Dirty Duck" pub; a popular bar called "The Terrace Bar"; Curiositea, a tea shop known for its hot chocolates, cakes and vintage atmosphere; The Graduate, a postgraduate social and study space; and The Food Station, formerly called The Bread Oven.

=== Student media ===
Student media at Warwick includes:

- Radio Warwick (RAW) – student radio station.
- The Boar – newspaper distributed free across campus every second Wednesday.

=== University Challenge ===
The university won BBC television's University Challenge competition in 2021. This was their second win – their first was in 2007, beating the title-holders University of Manchester in the final.

=== Esports ===
The University of Warwick are the seven-time UK Esports "University of the Year", having won the title every year since its inception. In August 2022, Warwick became the first UK university to receive a finalist nomination for the Esports Awards, for Esports Collegiate Program of the Year, with Head of Esports Jack Fenton also becoming the first UK nominee for Collegiate Ambassador of the Year. Warwick fields numerous esports teams each year through its student-run esports society, Warwick Esports, who compete out of the Esports Centre.

=== Student housing ===
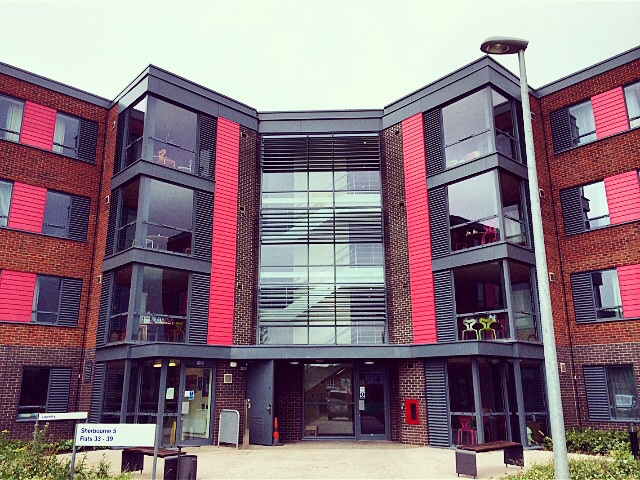
One of the Sherbourne residences

The Warwick campus currently has around 6,300 student bedrooms across a range of undergraduate and postgraduate residences. All of the residences are self-catered, and each has residential tutors and a warden. Warwick guarantees accommodation for all first-year undergraduate students, regardless of their present address. Many of the university's postgraduate population are also catered for, with some specific residences available for postgraduate living. Each residence accommodates a mixture of students both with home and international status, male and female, and, sometimes, undergraduate and postgraduate.

In their second and third years, many students live in one of the surrounding towns: either Coventry, Canley, Kenilworth or Royal Leamington Spa, where they can live in student accommodation or independently owned residences. Since 2011, Warwick has constructed two new halls of residences for the students. Bluebell, opened in 2011, offers accommodation in flats of eight people, with a total of 505 single rooms for first-year undergraduates. The Sherbourne residences was opened in 2012, which similarly provides 527 ensuite rooms to first-years, and was extended with a further 267 rooms in 2017. A further 700 new rooms were built in the Cryfield Village, namely Cryfield ‘Townhouse’ and ‘Standard’ residences.

=== Political incidents ===
In June 2014, the university announced Alex Davies, a member of the proscribed terrorist organisation National Action, voluntarily withdrew from his course. In early 2018, it was reported that a group of male students had constituted a group chat in which many references to rape, occasionally targeted at particular other students, and other sexual offences were made, in such a way which left significant cause for concern. As a result of this and other incidents, students staged a sit-in in 2021 in the central plaza of the university. In January 2020, the university was criticised for choosing not to adopt the IHRA definition of antisemitism. This decision was later reversed in October following intervention by Education Secretary Gavin Williamson.

== Notable people ==
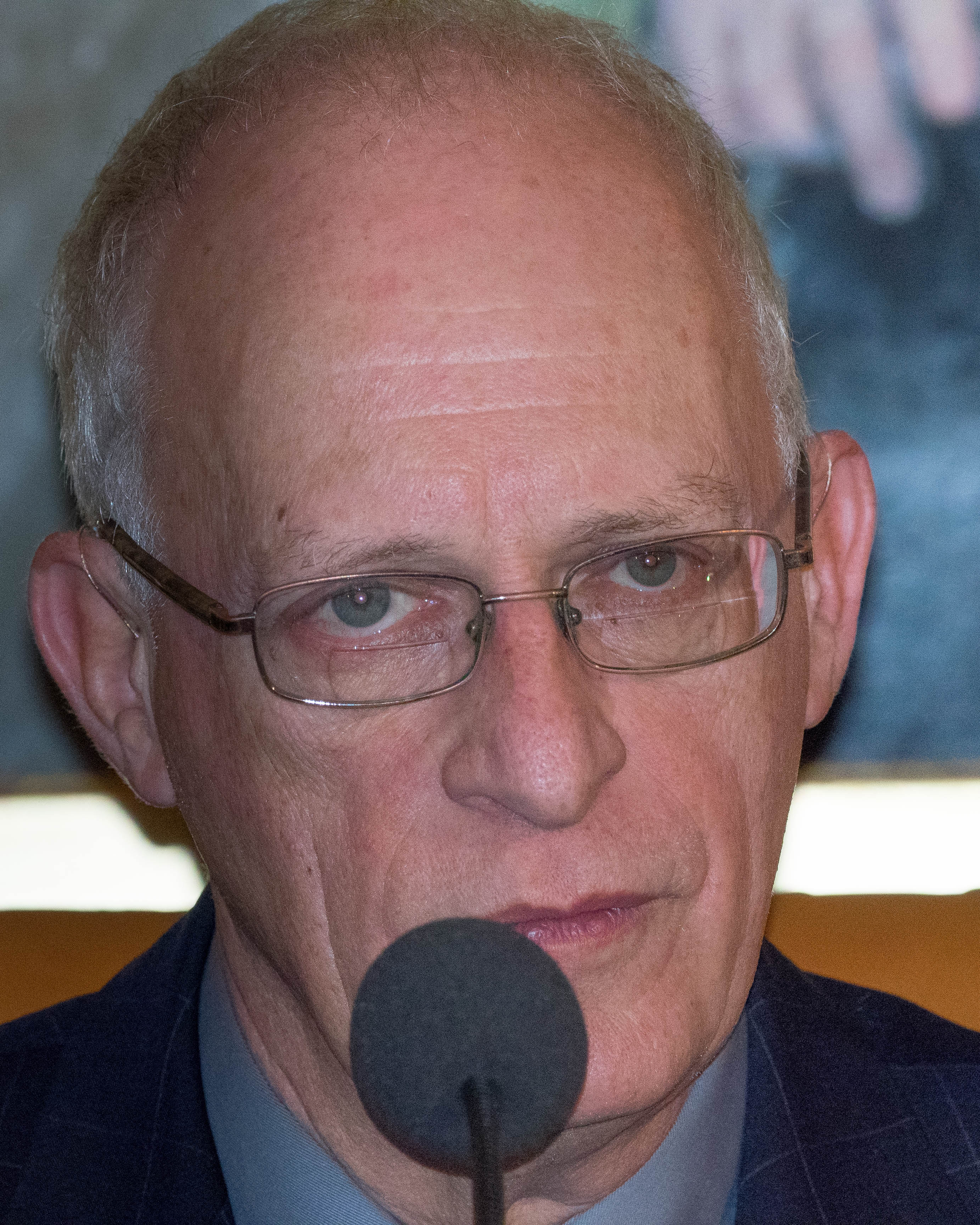
Oliver Hart, Nobel Laureate in Economics

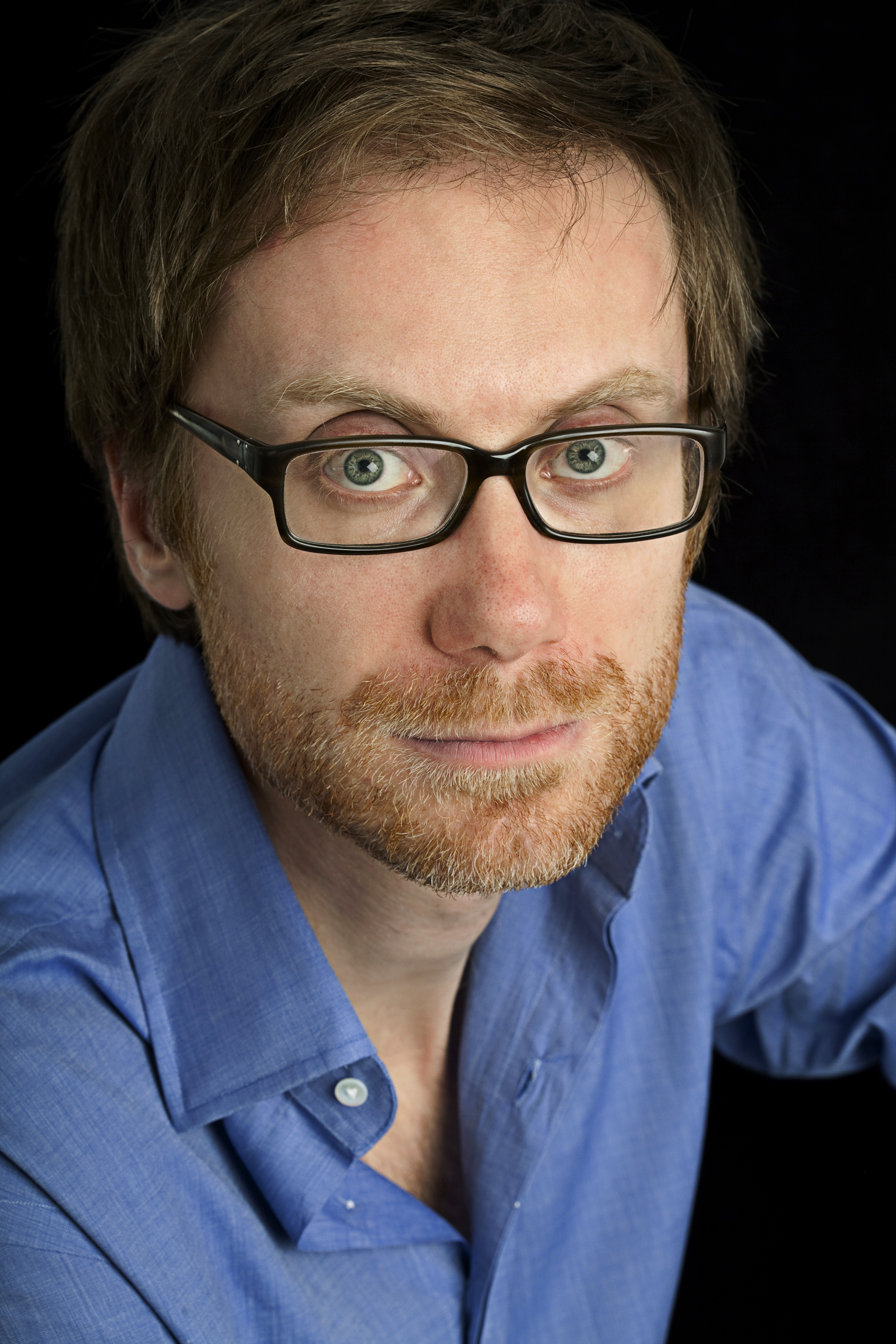
Stephen Merchant, Emmy Award Winner

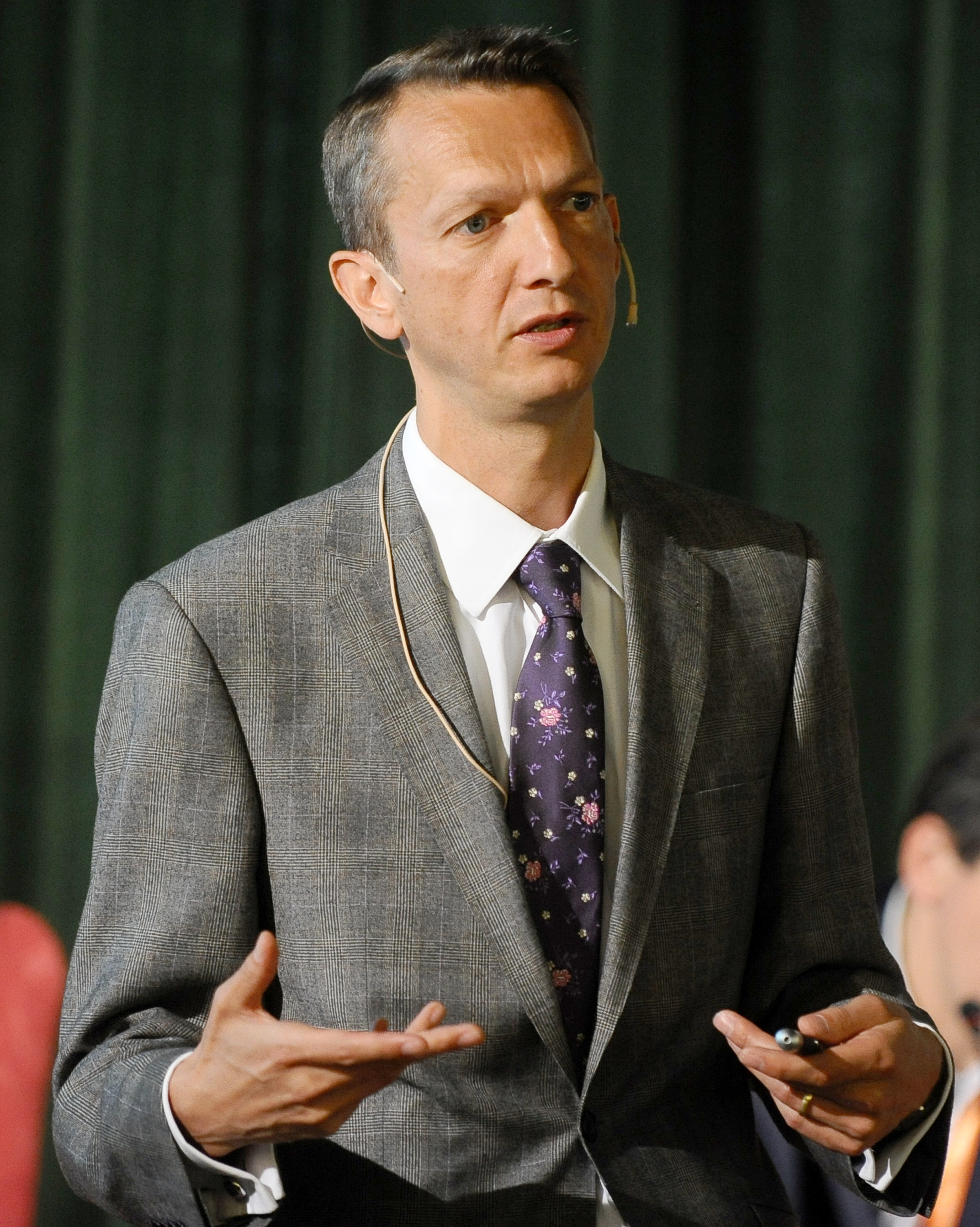
Andy Haldane, Chief Economist at the Bank of England

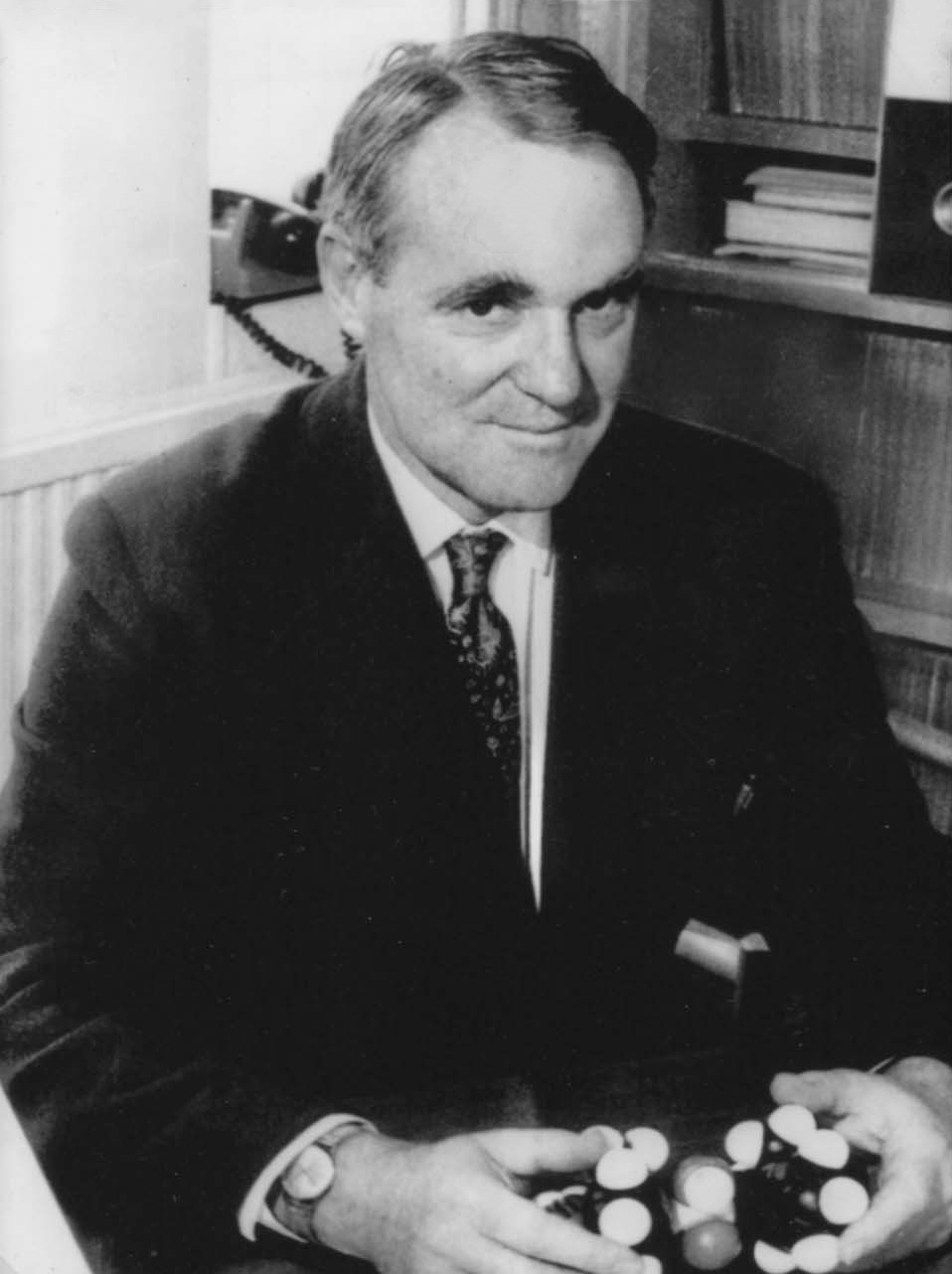
Sir John Cornforth, Nobel Laureate in Chemistry

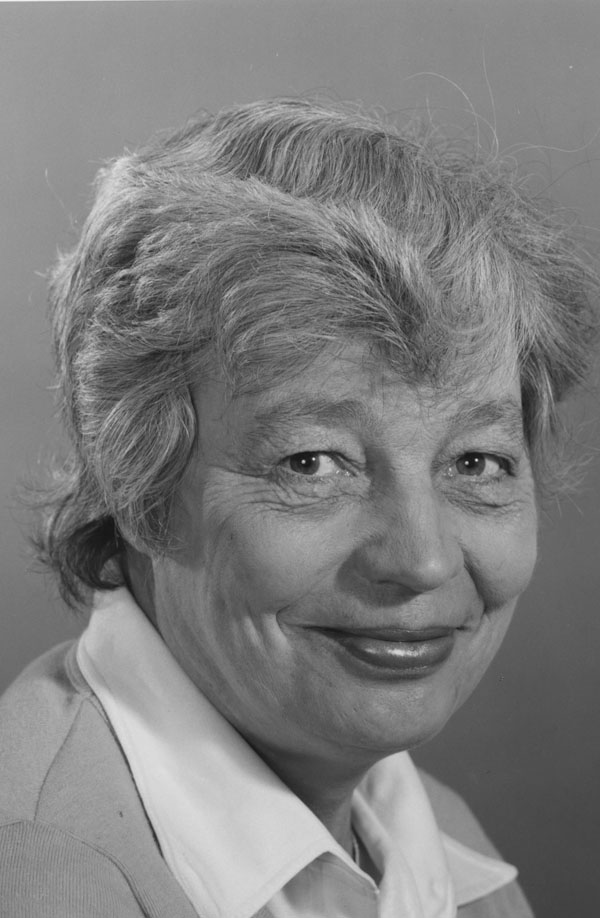
Susan Strange, developed the International Political Economy as a field of study

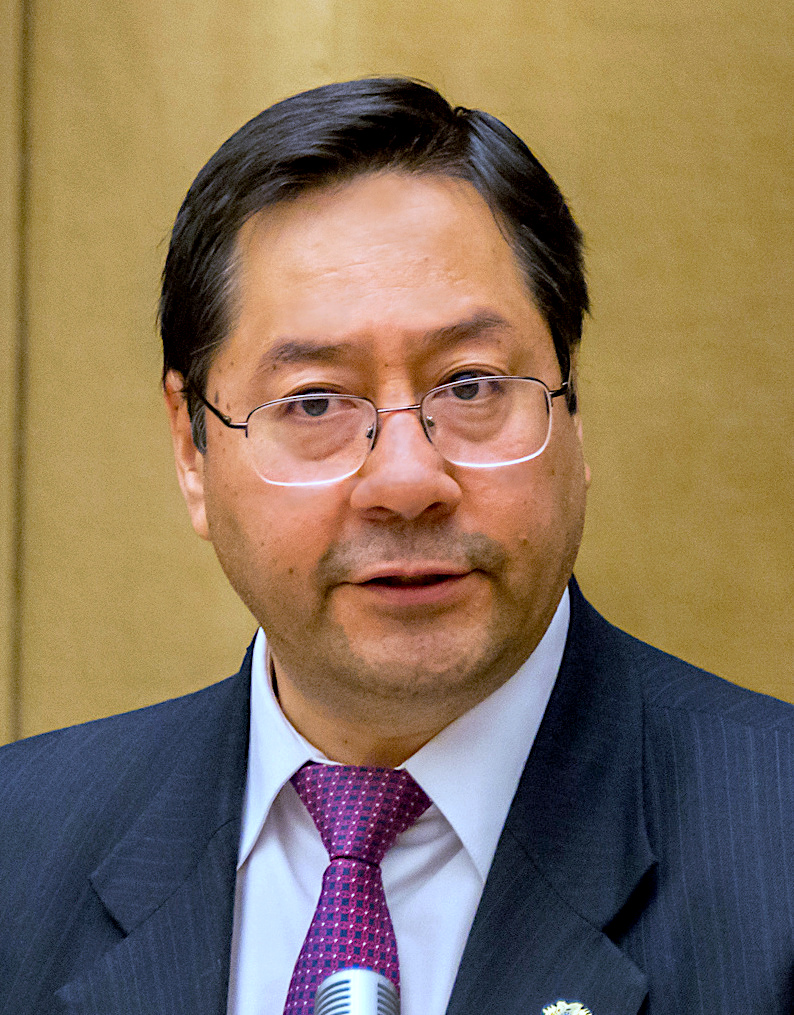
Luis Arce, President of the Plurinational State of Bolivia

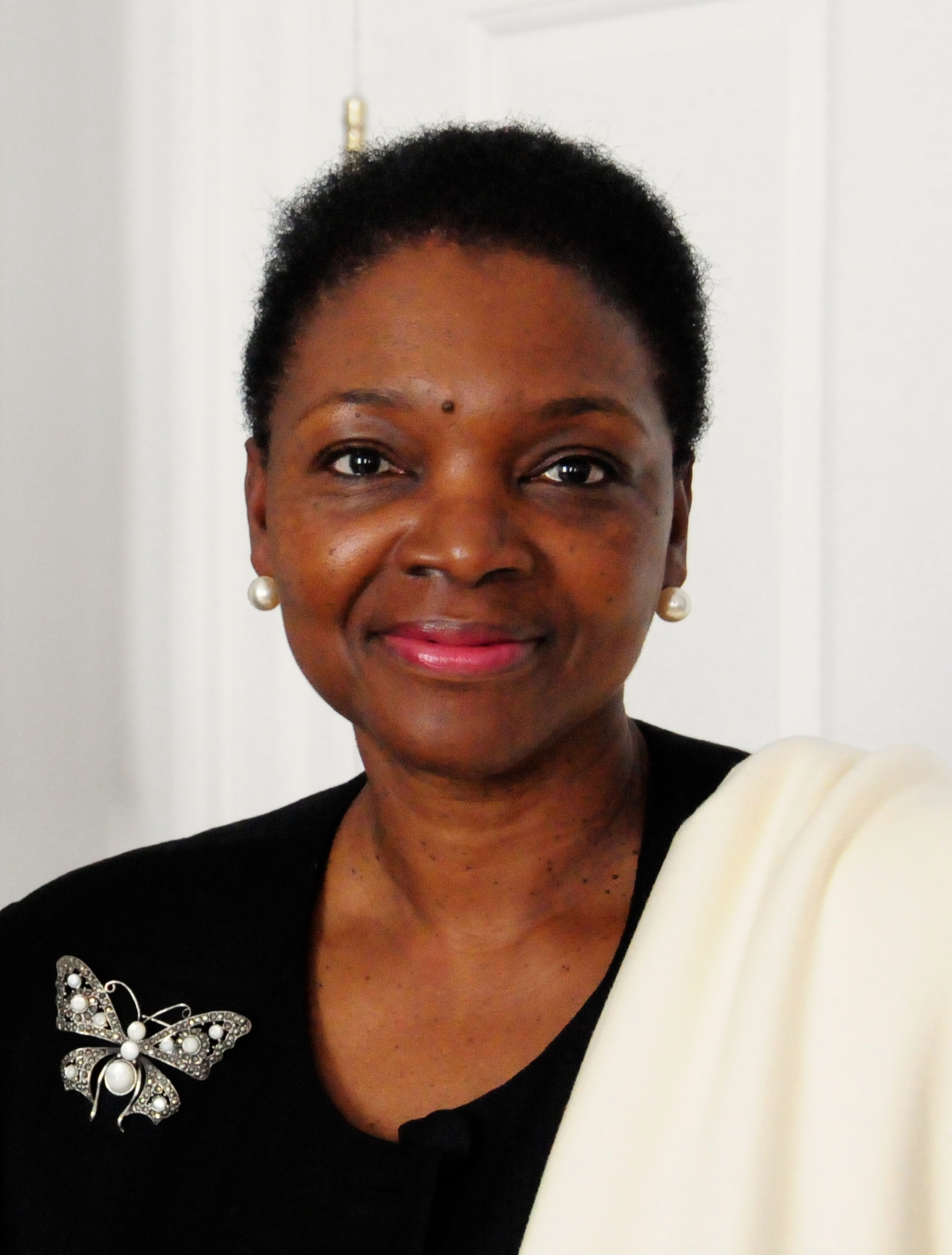
Valerie Amos, Baroness Amos, former diplomat and first-ever black head of an Oxford college

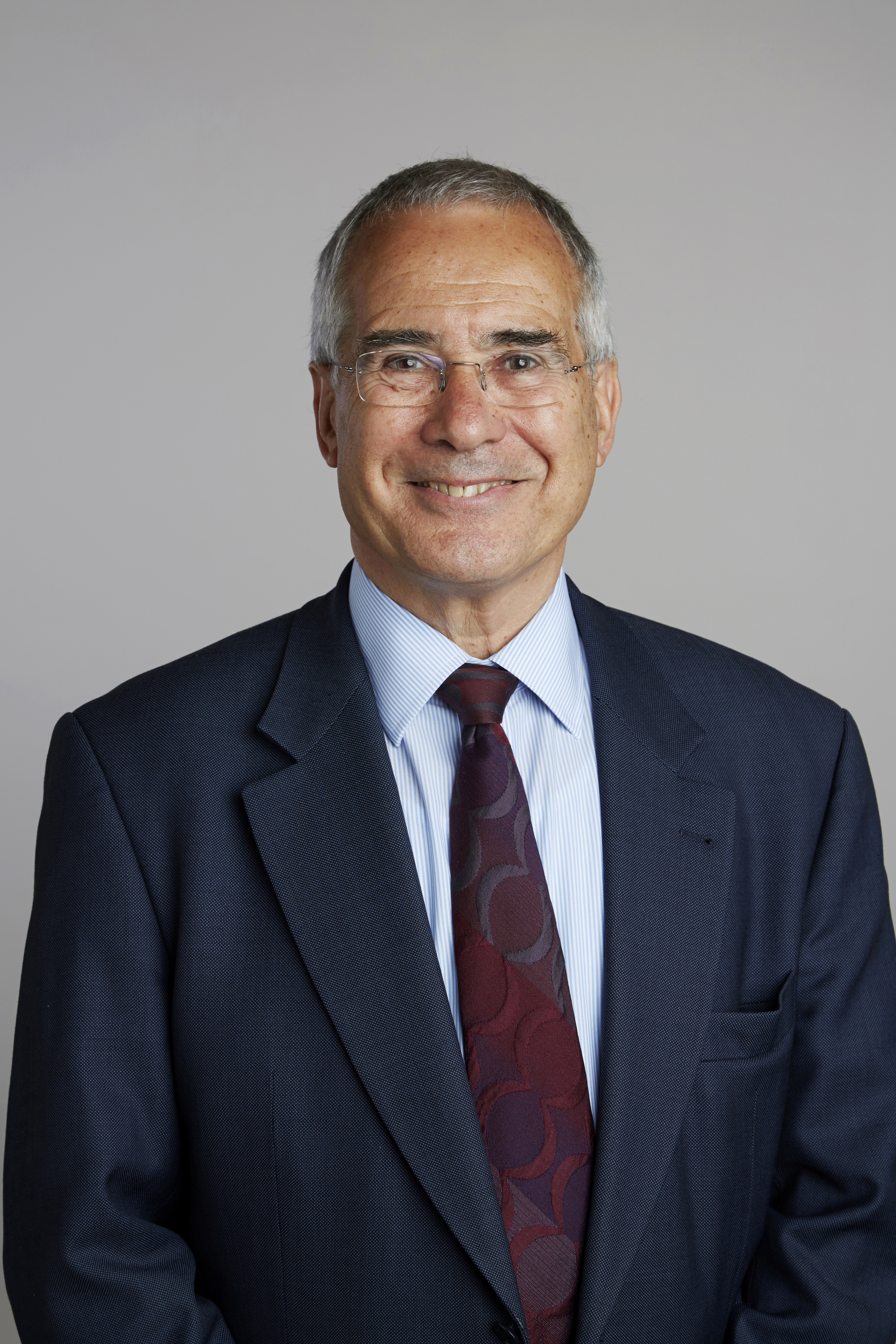
Nicholas Stern, Baron Stern of Brentford, former Chief Economist of the World Bank

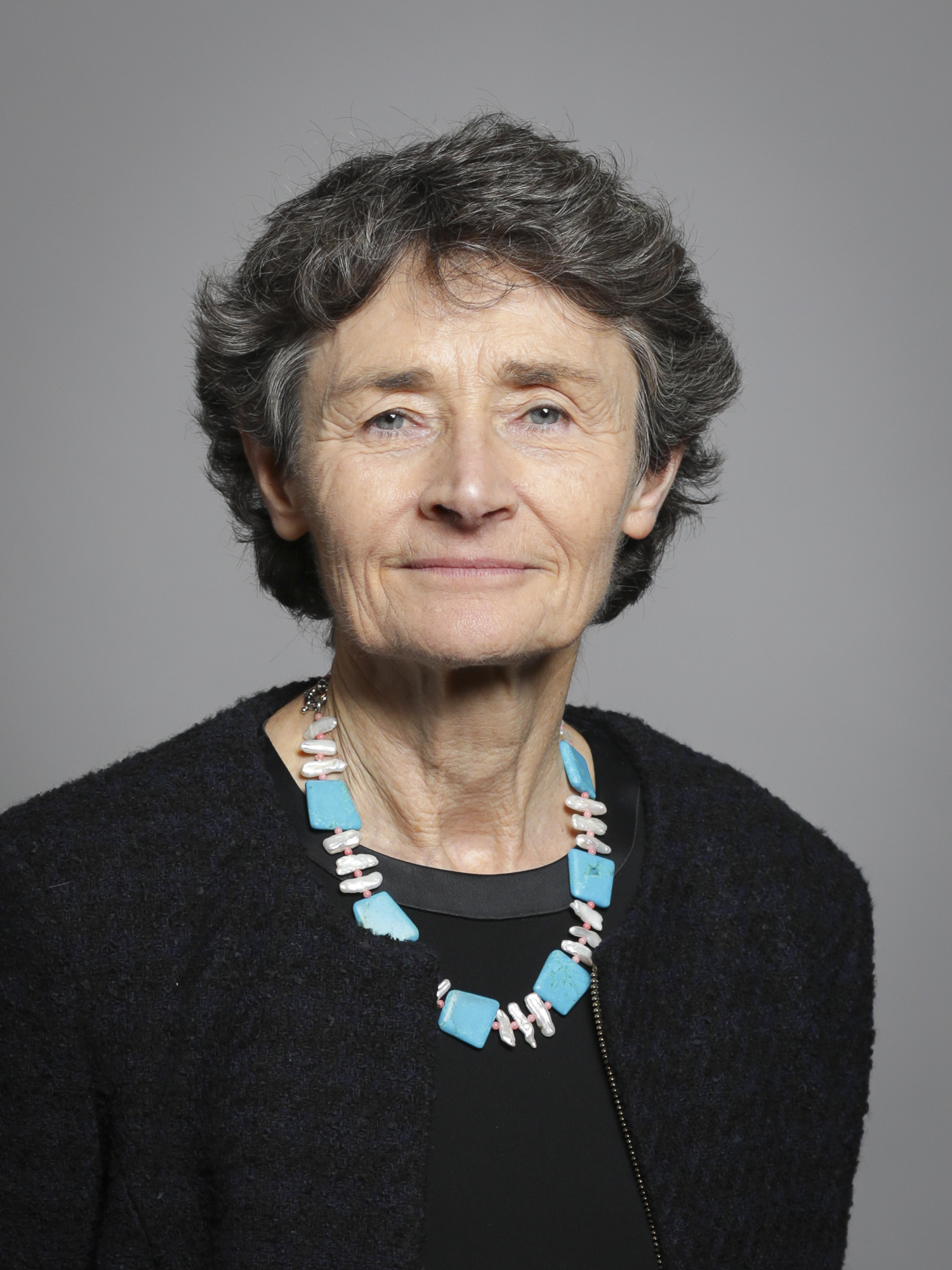
Estelle Morris, Baroness Morris of Yardley, Privy Counsellor; former Labour Secretary of State for Education

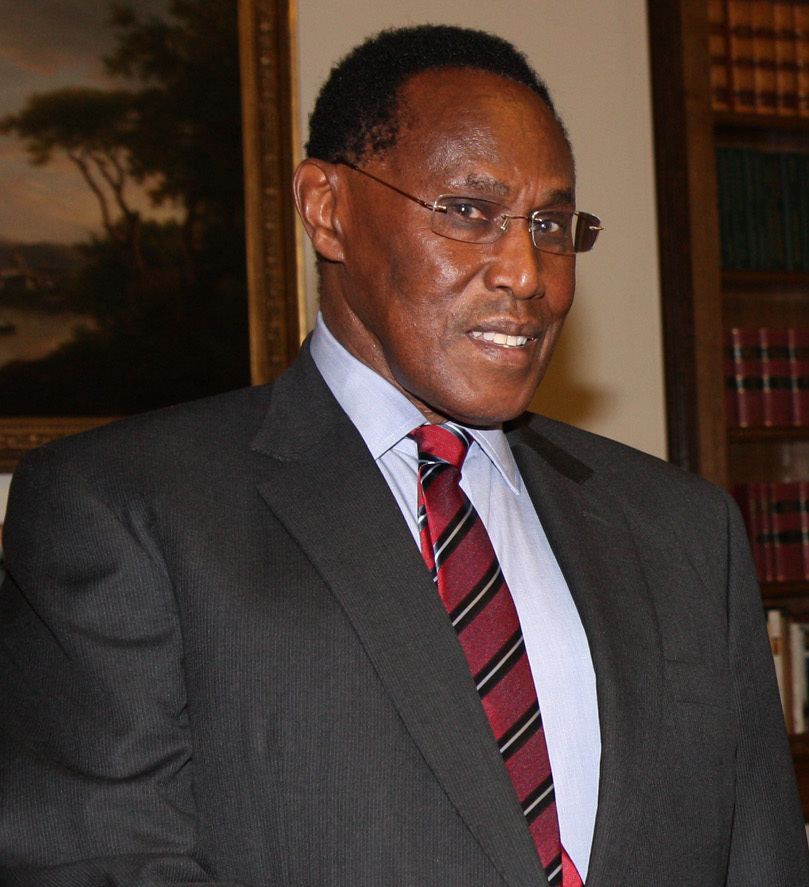
George Saitoti, former Vice-President of Kenya

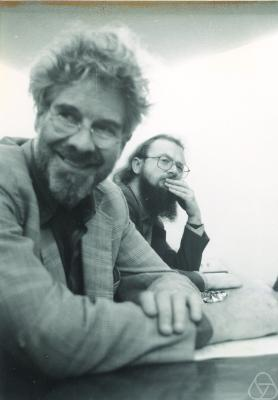
Sir Christopher Zeeman, mathematician

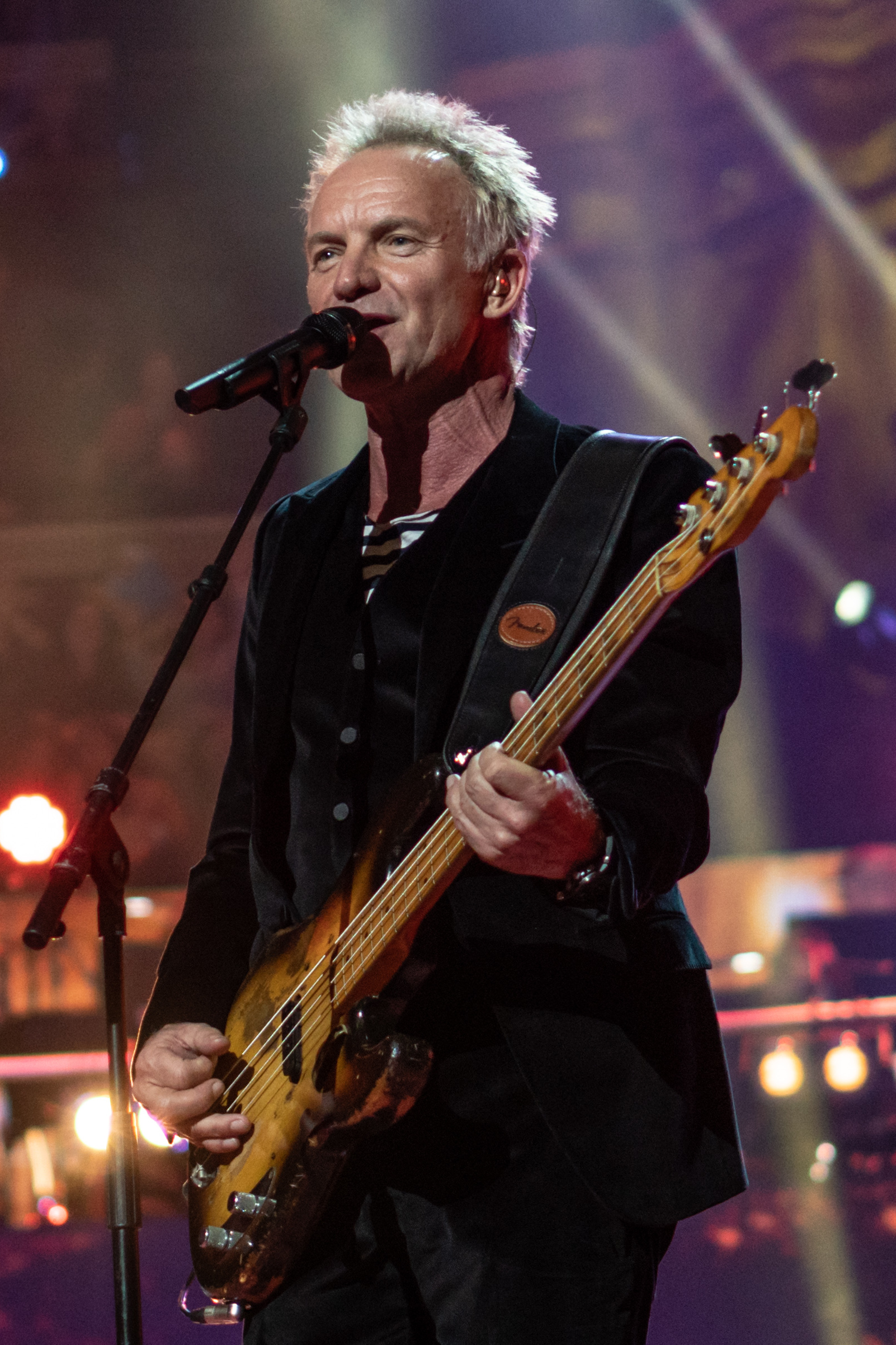
Sting, lead singer of The Police and solo artist

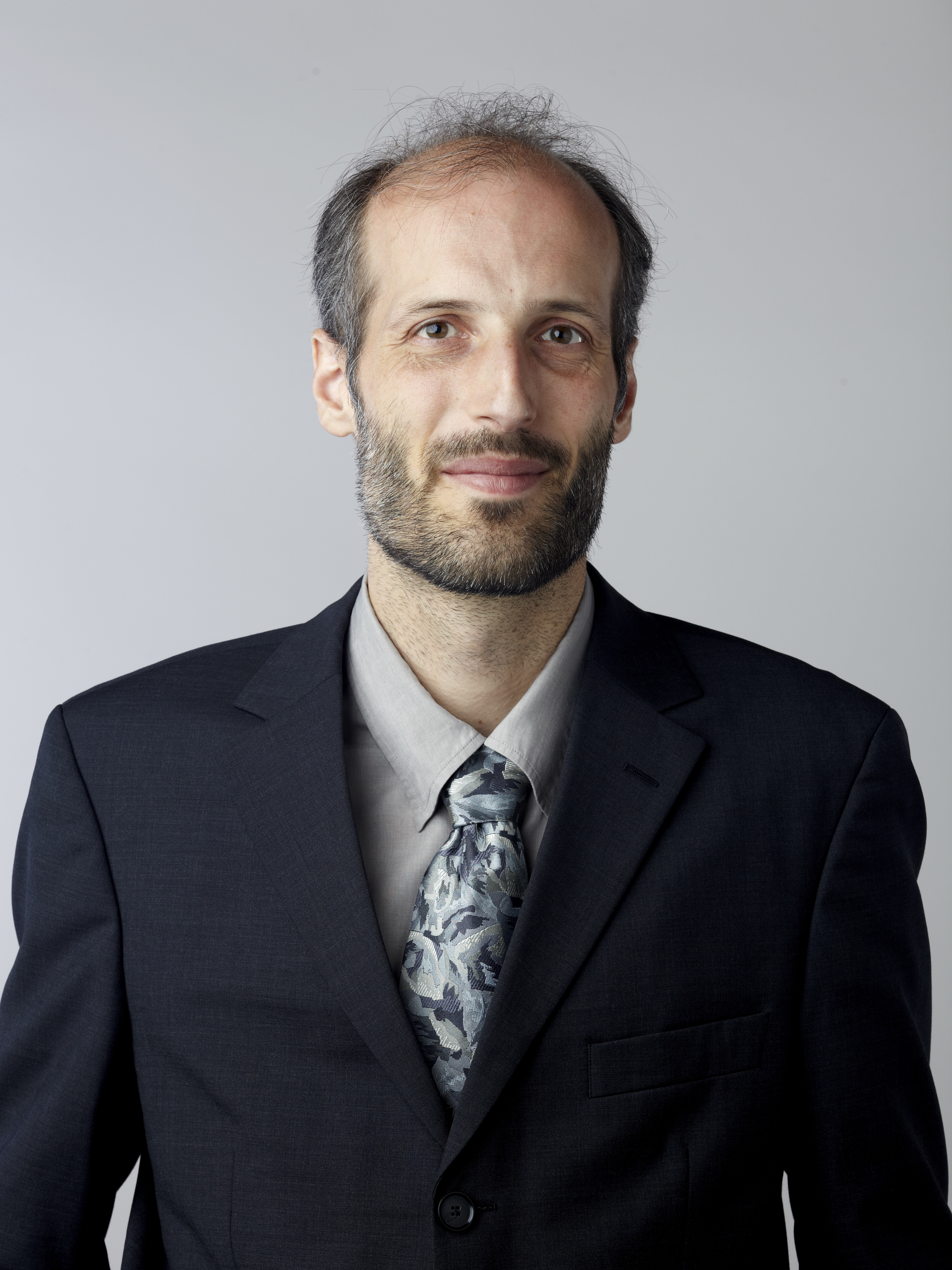
Martin Hairer, expert in stochastic partial differential equations; winner of the Fields Medal

Warwick has over 150,000 alumni and an active alumni network. Among the university's alumni, academic staff and researchers are two Nobel Laureates, a Turing Award winner, and a significant number of fellows of the British Academy, the Royal Society of Literature, the Royal Academy of Engineering, and the Royal Society. Former Warwick students active in politics and government include Guðni Th. Jóhannesson, President of Iceland; Luis Arce, President of Bolivia; Joseph Ngute, Prime Minister of Cameroon; Yakubu Gowon, former President of Nigeria; Sir Gus O'Donnell, former Cabinet Secretary and head of the British Civil Service; Andrew Haldane, Chief Economist at the Bank of England; David Davis, former Secretary of State for Exiting the European Union and former Shadow Home Secretary; Baroness Valerie Amos, the eighth UN Under-Secretary-General for Humanitarian Affairs and Emergency Relief Coordinator and former Leader of the House of Lords; Mahmoud Mohieldin the Senior Vice President of the World Bank Group; Bob Kerslake, former Head of the Home Civil Service; Kim Howells, former Foreign Office Minister; and Isabel Carvalhais, Portuguese MEP (S&D Group); H.A Hellyer, led the British government's Taskforce on Tackling Radicalisation and Extremism; George Chouliarakis, Greek Alternate Minister of Finance; and Sir Bob Kerslake, Head of the Home Civil Service.

In academia, people associated with Warwick include: Nobel Prize in Chemistry (1975) winner Sir John Cornforth who was a professor at Warwick; mathematicians Ian Stewart, David Preiss, David Epstein and Fields Medallist Martin Hairer; computer scientists Mike Cowlishaw and Leslie Valiant; and neurologist Oliver Sacks. In arts and the social sciences: Nobel Laureate Oliver Hart; economist and President of the British Academy Nicholas Stern, Baron Stern of Brentford; academic and Provost of Worcester College Sir Jonathan Bate; academic and journalist Germaine Greer; literary critic Susan Bassnett; historians Sir J. R. Hale and David Arnold; economist Andrew Oswald; economic historian Robert Skidelsky, Baron Skidelsky; Lady Margaret Archer, theorist in critical realism, former President of International Sociological Association, former President of the Pontifical Academy of Social Sciences; accelerationist philosopher Nick Land; philosopher Gillian Rose; Sir George Bain, former Principal of London Business School; John Williamson, English economist who coined the term Washington Consensus; Susan Strange, British scholar of international relations who was almost single-handedly responsible for creating international political economy; Avinash Dixit, former President of the Econometric Society and American Economic Association, elected to the American Academy of Arts and Sciences in 1992 and the National Academy of Sciences in 2005; Robert Calderbank, winner of the IEEE Richard W. Hamming Medal and the Claude E. Shannon Award; and Upendra Baxi, winner of the Padma Shri award.

Warwick graduates are active in business. In the automotive industry, this includes Linda Jackson, CEO of Citroën; Andy Palmer, CEO of Aston Martin; Ralf Speth, CEO of Jaguar Land Rover; Sudarshan Venu, MD of TVS Motor Company; Others include Bernardo Hees, former CEO of both the Heinz Company and of Burger King; Nigel Wilson, CEO of Legal & General; and Ian Gorham, CEO of Hargreaves Lansdown; Ness Wadia. Notable Warwick alumni in media, entertainment and the arts include Emmy and BAFTA Award-winning Stephen Merchant, best known for being the co-writer and co-director of the sitcoms The Office and Extras; Oscar-nominated screenwriter Tony Roche, known for co-writing and co-producing Veep and The Thick of It; Emmy and BAFTA-winner Brett Goldstein; Olivier Award-winning director and writer Dominic Cooke, who is also artistic director at the Royal Court Theatre; actress Ruth Jones; comedian and actor Frank Skinner; Guardian columnist Dawn Foster; blacksmith turned comedian and comedy writer Lloyd Langford; opera singer Christopher Maltman; actors Matt Stokoe and Adam Buxton; science fiction and fantasy author Jonathan Green; actor Julian Rhind-Tutt; Olivier Award-winning actor, Alex Jennings; author Anne Fine; author A.L. Kennedy; Tony Wheeler, creator of the Lonely Planet travel guides; Camila Batmanghelidjh; Merfyn Jones, governor of the BBC; and electronic dance music artist Gareth Emery. Grammy-and-Emmy Award-winning musician Sting enrolled at Warwick, but left after a term.

== See also ==
- Armorial of UK universities
- List of universities in the United Kingdom
- Plate glass university
