= Advanced Propulsion Centre =

UK non-profit organisation

- Founded: 2013
- Headquarters: University of Warwick, United Kingdom
- Key people: Ian Constance (CEO)
- Website: www.apcuk.co.uk

The Advanced Propulsion Centre (APC) is a non-profit organisation that facilitates funding to UK-based research and development projects developing net-zero emission technologies. It is headquartered at the University of Warwick in Coventry, England.

The APC manages a £1 billion investment fund, which is jointly supplied by the automotive industry – via the Automotive Council – and the UK government through the Department for Business and Trade (DBT) and managed by Innovate UK.

== History ==
The APC was founded in 2013 as a joint venture between the automotive industry and UK government to "research, develop and commercialise technologies for vehicles of the future". Both government and the automotive industry committed to investing £500 million each, totalling £1 billion over a ten year period. The creation of the APC was part of the coalition government's automotive industrial strategy.

In January 2014, Gerhard Schmidt was appointed as Chair and Tony Pixton as Chief Executive. It announced its first round of funding in April 2014, awarding £28.8 million funding to projects worth £133 million, led by Cummins, Ford, GKN and JCB.

The Advanced Propulsion Centre was officially opened by Vince Cable in November 2014.

Ian Constance was appointed Chief Executive in September 2015. In the 2015 Autumn Statement, the Chancellor, George Osborne, announced that an additional £225 million budget for automotive research and development would be facilitated by the APC.

== Funding competitions ==
The Advanced Propulsion Centre awards funding to consortia of organizations including vehicle manufacturers, tier 1 automotive suppliers, SMEs and academic institutions, which are developing low carbon powertrain technology.

The APC has several kinds of funding mechanisms available:

- Advanced Route to Market Demonstrator (ARMD)
- Automotive Transformation Fund
- Collaborative R&D Competitions
- Production Readiness Competition
- Technology Demonstrator Accelerator Programme (TDAP)

Date competition opened	Date funding awarded	Consortium leads	Funding amount
	April 2014	Ford, Cummins, GKN, JCB	£28.8 million
April 2014	November 2014	Jaguar Land Rover	£32 million
November 2014	March 2015	Wrightbus, Intelligent Energy, Hofer Powertrain, Perkins Engines	£80 million
May 2015	January 2016	The London Taxi Company, Jaguar Land Rover, Morgan Motor Company, AGM Batteries, Parker Hannifin	£75 million
December 2015	September 2016	Jaguar Land Rover, McLaren Automotive, Turner Powertrain, Dearman	£84 million
January 2017	April 2017	BMW, New Holland Agriculture, Jaguar Land Rover, Williams Advanced Engineering, Penso Consultin, Ford, Westfield Sportscars	£62 million
July 2017	January 2018	Ford, GKN, Jaguar Land Rover	£26 million
January 2018	March 2018	Artemis Intelligent Power, Ceres Power, hofer powertrain	£35 million
April 2018	June 2018	Jaguar Land Rover, Sigmatex	£22 million
August 2018	October 2018	Arcola Energy, Ford, Jaguar Land Rover	£25 million
August 2021	June 2022	OX Delivers, Norton	£43.7 million

== Spokes ==
The Advanced Propulsion Centre operates a 'hub and spoke' model, where the 'hub' is its headquarters at the University of Warwick, and the 'spokes' are universities across the UK with specialisms in particular areas of net-zero emission vehicle technology.

Spoke locations:

- Newcastle University - Newcastle upon Tyne, England – Electric Machines
- University of Nottingham – Nottingham, England – Power Electronics
- University of Warwick – Coventry, England – Electrical Energy Storage
- University of Bath – Bath, England – TPS System Efficiency
- Loughborough University – London, England – Institute of Digital Engineering
- University of Brighton – Brighton, England – TPS Thermal Efficiency

== Activities ==
In April 2018, APC announced that an APC-funded project has enabled Ford to develop new low emissions technology, which will go into production on its 1.0-litre EcoBoost engine.

In February 2018, Nissan completed an APC-funded project with Hyperdrive, the Newcastle University, Warwick Manufacturing Group and Zero Carbon futures, to develop a new production process for its 40kWh battery cells. The cells are produced in Sunderland, England, and are fitted to the Nissan Leaf.

In January 2018, Yasa, an electric motor manufacturer based in Oxford, England, opened a new factory to produce 100,000 motors per year, using APC funding. The facility created 150 jobs, with 80% of production expected to be exported.

In September 2017, the Metropolitan Police trialled a fleet of hydrogen-powered Suzuki Burgman scooters, which were developed as part of an APC-funded project.

In January 2017, an APC grant allowed Ford to begin a 12-month pilot of its Transit Custom Plug-in Hybrid in London, England.

== See also ==
- Automotive Council
- Innovate UK
- Department for Business, Energy and Industrial Strategy
- Society of Motor Manufacturers and Traders
