= NHSU =

NHSU or variant, may refer to:

- National Health Service of Ukraine (NHSU; Ukrainian: НСЗУ, lit. 'NSZU'), Ukraine
- NHS University, UK

== See also ==
- Northwestern Health Sciences University (NWHSU), Bloomington, Minnesota, USA; sometimes referred to as NHSU
- Southern New Hampshire University (SNHU); sometimes referred to as New Hampshire Southern University (NHSU)
