= Coventry College of Education =

Coordinates: 52.388°N 1.568°W

Coventry College of Education existed as a separate institution until its incorporation into the University of Warwick in 1978 as the Westwood campus. It was located to the north of the university's main site.

From 1948, the Principal of Coventry Teacher Training College (later called Coventry College of Education) was Joan Dillon Browne (1912–2009), who was made an honorary professor on her retirement in 1975. Under her leadership, the college roll grew to some 1,500 students, among them – in the mid-1970s – Estelle Morris, future Secretary of Education, who remembered "JD" as "a pioneer in showing what women could achieve, long before it was fashionable to do so". On Joan Dillon's retirement, vice-principal Gordon Lawrence (1923–2011) became principal. When the college merged with the University of Warwick in 1978, he was appointed as the first Director of the Institute of Education, remaining in post until his retirement in 1984.

During the early 1970s the college arranged overseas visits and exchanges for students. These included visits to Silkeborg in Denmark and a student exchange scheme with Eastern Michigan University in the USA.

In 2013, a working group at the University of Warwick recommended that the Institute of Education should be replaced by the establishment of two different units, "a University-wide academic Centre for Education Studies and a business unit for the professional education of teachers".

In 2013, Dr Adam Boddison was appointed as the Director of the Centre for Professional Education. Under his leadership, the Centre for Professional Education was judged by Ofsted to be outstanding in all areas for both Primary and Secondary teacher training in January 2016. He left that year to become the Chief Executive of the National Association of Special Educational Needs.

== Former tutors of note ==
- Andrew Davies is a British author and screenwriter who lives in nearby Kenilworth.
