= Hanover Foundations =

Hanover Foundations was a registered charity based in London, England, operating in the education sector. It ran its first programmes in schools in 1997 and was a major delivery partner in London Challenge.

Hanover offered professional development coaching programmes to students of age 14 and above. Its programmes were developed from proven business methods used to develop both individuals and groups at all levels of management within public and private sector organisations.

In 2006, The Right Honourable Estelle Morris, Baroness Morris of Yardley PC was appointed the organisation's first Patron.

Serena Standing was Chief Executive from its early days of incorporation and led it through to becoming accredited in Government and local authority delivery programmes to schools, academies and FE colleges.
