= Whalley Range High School =

Coordinates: 53.4423°N 2.2462°W

Whalley Range 11-18 High School
- Whalley Range, M16 8GW; England

Information
- Other name: Whalley Range High School
- Type: Academy
- Motto: Aspire • Believe • Achieve
- Established: 1891
- Local authority: Manchester
- Department for Education URN: 141264 Tables
- Gender: Girls
- Age: 11 to 18
- Enrolment: 1,569
- Colour: Purple
- Website: www.wrhs1118.co.uk

Whalley Range 11–18 High School, also known as Whalley Range High School, is a girls' school in Whalley Range, Manchester, England.

== History ==
The school was founded in 1891, and was bought by the Education Committee of the Corporation in 1908 when it provided place for 300 girls. A few years later it was extended by the purchase of Alder House and the number of places were increased to 370. Girls were then admitted at the age of six and the curriculum allowed for education up to the matriculation standard and modern languages were well catered for. It became a grammar school in 1944 and a comprehensive school in 1967. It was until 1939 at a site in Withington Road, adjacent to College Road. The present building was built in 1939 in the Neo-Georgian style (architects: City Architects) and it was extended in 1962 and 1997.

Whalley Range 11-18 High School is a multi-cultural suburban girls' comprehensive school in south Manchester. The school gained specialist status as a Business and Enterprise College in September 2002, was re-designated in 2006 and achieved a second specialism as a Sports College from April 2007. It is also a Hub school for Business and Enterprise and provides support and training for schools across the north west.

The school has nearly 1,700 students currently on roll, with 300 students in the sixth form. There are 200 staff, both teaching and non-teaching. An Ofsted inspection in March 2007 identified some areas of good practice. The numbers of students achieving 5 or more A*-C passes at GCSE have risen from 16% to 64%. A Level and GNVQ courses have been extended and exceed national averages in some subjects. The school has been described by The Daily Telegraph as "one of Britain's top state schools".

The school converted to academy status on 1 September 2014 and forms part of a multi-academy trust with Levenshulme High School.

== Range Radio & Media ==
The school was shortlisted for the 2013 Education Innovation awards for their pioneering use of media. This includes Range television, showcasing the best work from the school on YouTube.

The school has its own radio station, Range Radio, and was one of the first High Schools in the country to be allocated its own frequency by Ofcom, allowing listeners to tune into the broadcasts using their own standard radios. The station is now based online, offering content on demand for both students and the general public.

Range Radio was opened by a former student of the school, Estelle Morris, at that time the Minister of State for Schools, on 6 July 1999, and is housed in a custom-built studio in one of the quadrangles. This allows staff, students and visitors to see into the studio from its surrounding glass corridors. The studio is equipped with industry-standard equipment.

== Notable alumni and staff ==
=== Alumni ===
Notable former students include:

- Afshan Azad - Actress, known for playing Padma Patil in the Harry Potter franchise
- Salma and Zahra Halane — Twin sisters who joined the Islamic State of Iraq and the Levant at age 16
- Christine McCafferty - Former MP for Calder Valley
- Estelle Morris Baroness Morris of Yardley, former Secretary of State for Education
- Dame Robina Shah, a Deputy Lieutenant and High Sheriff of Greater Manchester

=== Staff ===
Jean Else served as headteacher at Whalley Range in 1994 when the school had the worst truancy rate in England and Wales. During her headship, truancy dropped to below the national average, pupil numbers were almost doubled, and GCSE results improved from 16% to 34% of pupils getting the top grades. School inspectors called it "a very good school with many strengths and few weaknesses ... exceptionally well led and very efficiently managed and administered".

In November 2004, Else and several other senior staff members were suspended from duty, pending an investigation by Manchester City Council after allegations were made by the Audit Commission following their own two-year investigation.

Else pursued a lengthy battle to return to the school but was finally dismissed in August 2006, along with her sister, Maureen Rochford, Assistant Head, and Stewart Scott, Director of Governance, following allegations of nepotism and questionable management.
