= Afshan Azad =

British actress, model, and media personality (born 1988)

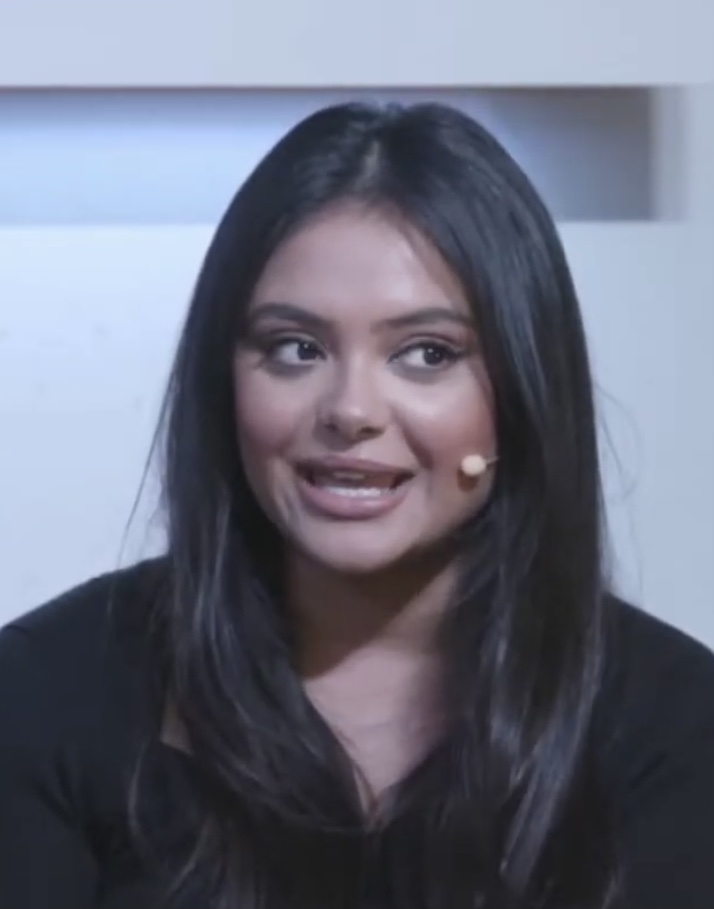
- Azad in 2020
- Born: Afshan Noor Azad; 12 February 1988 (age 38); Manchester, England
- Education: University of Salford (BA)
- Occupations: Actress; model
- Years active: 2005–present
- Known for: Padma Patil in the Harry Potter film series
- Spouse: Nabil Kazi (m. 2018)
- Children: 2

Afshan Noor Azad-Kazi (née Azad; born 12 February 1988) is a British actress, model, and media personality. She is best known for playing the role of Padma Patil in the Harry Potter film series, beginning in 2005 with Harry Potter and the Goblet of Fire.

== Early life ==
Azad was born in Longsight, Manchester, to Bangladeshi parents from Chittagong. She attended Whalley Range High School, and took AS-levels in chemistry, biology, English and business studies at Xaverian College in Rusholme. She went on to graduate with a Bachelor of Arts in Journalism and Design from the University of Salford.

== Career ==
Azad is known for playing Padma Patil in five of the Harry Potter films, starting with 2005's Harry Potter and the Goblet of Fire. She acquired the role when casting agents visited her school and, after having attended several auditions, chose her for the part. Azad had stated that she had auditioned "just for the fun of it" and surprisingly got the part.

In 2017, Azad guest presented an episode of the CBBC series Marrying Mum & Dad with Ed Petrie whilst Naomi Wilkinson was away.

== Advocacy ==
In October 2023, Azad signed an open letter by Artists4Ceasefire to Joe Biden, President of the United States, of artists calling for a ceasefire of the Israeli bombardment of Gaza.

== Personal life ==
Azad married Nabil Kazi on 19 August 2018. They are based in Worcester. They have two daughters.

On 29 June 2010, Azad's father and brother appeared in Manchester Magistrates' Court, charged with threatening to kill her after discovering she was dating a non-Muslim man. They were released on bail. Azad's brother was charged with "assault occasioning actual bodily harm", while Azad stayed with friends in London. On 20 December 2010, Azad did not attend court when the prosecution accepted her brother's guilty plea to assault occasioning actual bodily harm and a judge ruled both men were not guilty of threatening to kill Azad. On 21 January 2011, Azad's brother was imprisoned for six months.

== Filmography ==
Film

Year	Title	Role	Notes
2005	Harry Potter and the Goblet of Fire	Padma Patil	
2007	Harry Potter and the Order of the Phoenix	Padma Patil	
2009	Harry Potter and the Half-Blood Prince	Padma Patil	
2010	Harry Potter and the Deathly Hallows – Part 1	Padma Patil	
2011	Harry Potter and the Deathly Hallows – Part 2	Padma Patil	

Video games

Year	Title	Role	Notes
2007	Harry Potter and the Order of the Phoenix	Padma Patil (voice)	

Music videos

Year	Title	Role	Performer(s)
2021	U	The Friend	Nissu

== See also ==
- British Bangladeshi
- List of British Bangladeshis
- List of Harry Potter cast members
