= Robina Shah =

British psychologist

Dame Robina Shah DBE
- Born: Robina Shahnaz Shah; July 1962 (age 64)
- Education: Whalley Range High School
- Alma mater: University of Manchester
- Known for: Patient care
- Scientific career
- Workplaces: University of Manchester; Stockport NHS Foundation Trust; Manchester Football Association; Stockport Grammar School; Seashell Trust
- Thesis: The Experience of Care and Support for YoungPeople with Disabilities in the South Asian Community (2008)

Dame Robina Shahnaz Shah DBE FRCGP (born July 1962) is a British psychologist. She is an expert in patient care and has partnered with UK medical schools to create patient centred education.

In 2019, she became the first woman British High Sheriff of Pakistani descent. She was made a Dame in the 2023 New Year Honours for services to patient care.

== Early life and education ==
Shah is from Chorlton-cum-Hardy, Manchester. She attended Whalley Range High School. She attended the University of Manchester for undergraduate studies, where she completed a degree in psychology. She has said she chose to study psychology because her father had minored in the subject, and she always heard him discuss it with such passion. During her third year, she focused on clinical, social and developmental psychology. She stayed at Manchester for her doctoral research, specialising in psychosocial medicine. After earning a PhD, she started a career as a community psychologist. Her early research considered the experiences of South Asian young people with learning difficulties. She worked with Manchester Social Services, and found that awareness of services and cultural stereotypes impacted people's experiences in the care system. Her research expanded to Birmingham, and Shah turned it into a book.

Shah's research identified one of the main areas of distress for the parents of children with disabilities is the circumstacnces in which they first discover their disability, and how a negative interaction can shape the rest of a family's life.

== Research and career ==
In 1999, Shah was approached by Barnardo's to research the experiences of young carers from South Asian backgrounds. She identified that they experienced considerable isolation in school, and did not receive appropriate support from society. She was made Chair of the Board of Directors at Stepping Hill Hospital, where she led the merger between the community healthcare and the acute hospital.

From 2000 to 2012, Shah served as Chair of the Stockport NHS Foundation Trust. She was motivated to return to academia because she enjoyed teaching. Shah worked as consultant psychologist from 2004. In 2011, David Cameron appointed Shah to the Future's Forum, where she helped to revise the NHS Constitution for England. She joined the faculty at the University of Manchester in 2012.

In recognition of her research into the experience of disabled children, she was awarded a Member of the British Empire (MBE).

Shah has been involved with medical school education. She helped to guide the General Medical Council and Medical Schools Council report, First Do No Harm. At Manchester, she was made Director of the School of Medical Sciences, University of Manchester's Doubleday Centre for Patient Experience, and Professor of Psychosocial Medicine.

In the NHS, Shah addressed issues centred on hate crime, disability and patient care. She had said that she most enjoyed "working with vulnerable people and giving them a voice,". In 2023, she was appointed Dame Commander of the British Empire for services to patient care.

In December 2025, Shah was appointed Chair of Wrightington, Wigan and Leigh NHS Foundation Trust

=== Public service ===
In 2004, Shah was appointed Deputy Lieutenant of Greater Manchester. In 2019, Shah was appointed High Sheriff of Greater Manchester. She used the position to engage young people with policy making, and established 'Team High Sheriff'; a platform for ambassadors to promote their local communities. Team High Sheriff coordinated regular events, including launching apprenticeship programmes. From 2016 to 2022, Shah served as a non-executive director of the Manchester Football Association and on The Football Association Women's Board. Shah served as a director of Stockport Grammar School and the Seashell Trust.
