= Jean Else =

English schoolteacher (born 1950)

- Born: c. 1951 (age 74–75)
- Occupation: School Teacher
- Known for: First person to have a Damehood revoked

Jean Else (born c. 1951) is an English former educator and head teacher, who garnered both acclaim and notoriety over the course of her long teaching career. Found guilty in 2006 of nepotism, financial mismanagement and making illegal payments to staff, she was dismissed and banned from working as a head teacher. In 2011 she had her Damehood revoked. She is the only woman created a Dame (of any order of British female knighthood) to date to have the honour revoked.

== Career ==
Jean Else took over Whalley Range High School in Manchester in 1994 when the girls' comprehensive school had the worst truancy rate in England and Wales. During her headship, truancy was cut to below the national average, pupil numbers were almost doubled, and GCSE results improved from 16% to 34% of pupils getting the top grades. School inspectors called it "a very good school with many strengths and few weaknesses ... exceptionally well led and very efficiently managed and administered".

In addition to her activities at Whalley Range, she also undertook work for the local council and government, earning £140,000 per year.

== Misconduct, dismissal and banned as head teacher ==
In November 2004, she and several other senior staff members were suspended from duty, pending an investigation by Manchester City Council after allegations were made by the Audit Commission following their own two-year investigation.

The General Teaching Council charged Else with cronyism for promoting her twin sister from part-time clerical assistant to the post of the assistant head. The council's professional conduct committee said Else was guilty of failing to observe minimum standards in recruiting and promoting staff. In August 2006, Else was dismissed after auditors accused her of nepotism, financial mismanagement and making illegal payments to staff.

Her sister, Maureen Rochford, and Stewart Scott, director of governance, were also dismissed. The disciplinary panel also banned Else from working as a head teacher, deputy or assistant head. It said Else lacked "openness" in the way in which she hired and promoted teachers.

== Damehood revoked ==
On 8 February 2011, the decision of the Honours Forfeiture Committee was announced in the London Gazette that Else's damehood, which had been awarded in 2001, had been revoked. She is the only woman created a dame (of any order of British order of chivalry) to date to have the honour revoked.

== Other affiliations ==
Else was a trustee of the Imperial War Museum from 2003 to 2007.

== Personal life ==
Else lives in Macclesfield, Cheshire. Her wife, Mavis Pittilla, died in 2022.
