= Westwood (Campus) =

Campus of the University of Warwick

Coordinates: 52.3894°N 1.5610°W

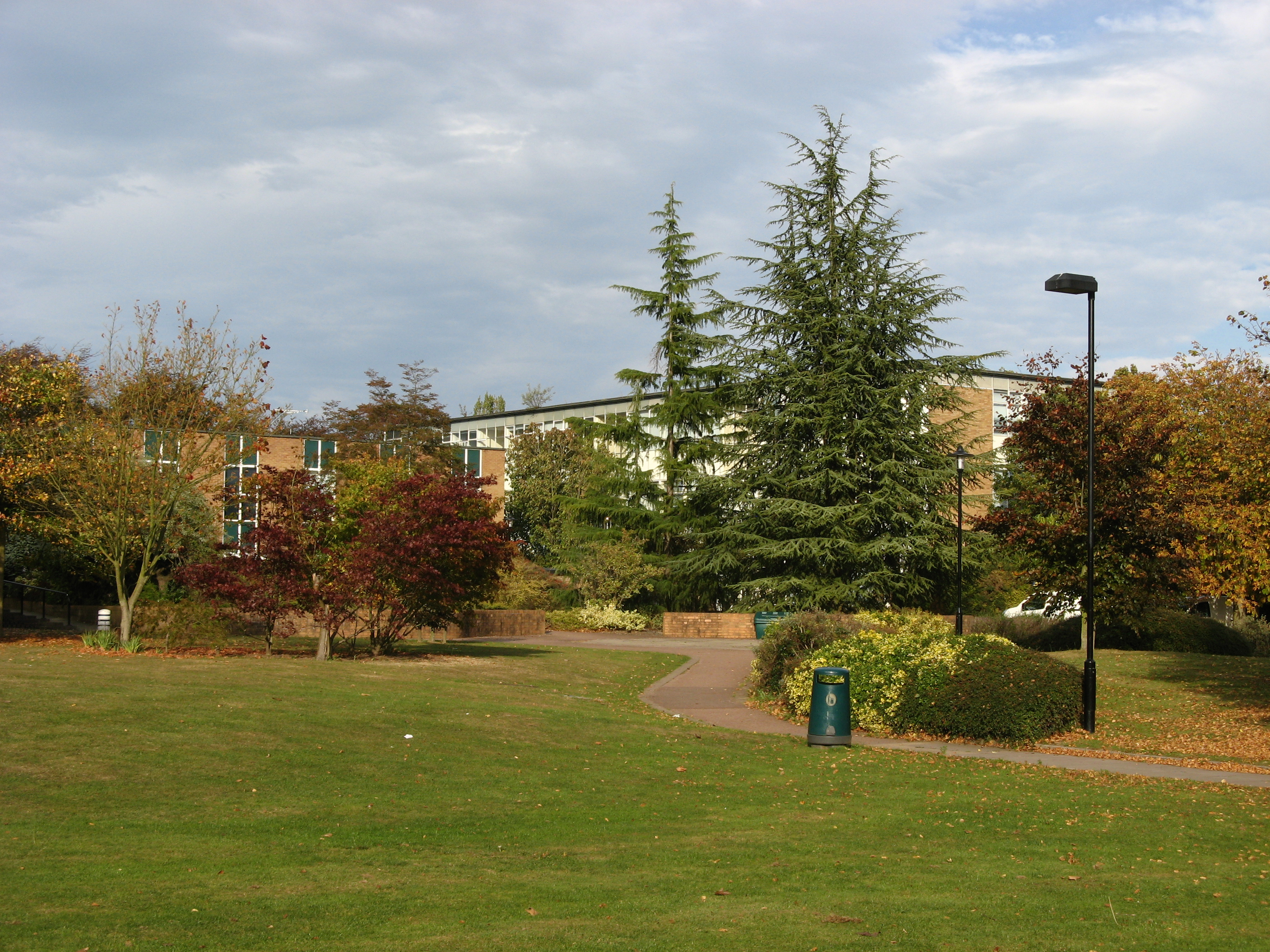
A central grassy area of Westwood

Westwood is one of three campuses of the University of Warwick (the other two being the main campus and Gibbet Hill).

== Description ==
It is a triangular shaped campus bordered by the houses on Charter Avenue and by Gibbet Hill Road, located to the north of the main campus. It contains several halls of residence, a restaurant/cafe, laundrette, a small Costcutter shop, and other buildings used for teaching purposes. All the buildings are set amongst a leafy backdrop of trees which makes the Westwood campus very picturesque in summer. To the west of the campus is a sports centre with many facilities including several pitches, a running track, and a multi-purpose hall. It takes roughly 15 minutes to walk from Westwood to the centre of the main campus at a brisk pace. Many of the buildings are closer and can be reached in approximately 10 minutes at a brisk pace. It takes a little under 5 minutes to walk to Tesco and the nearby Cannon Park shopping centre.

== History ==
The site was originally the Coventry College of Education until its merger with the University in the mid-seventies.

== Halls of Residence ==
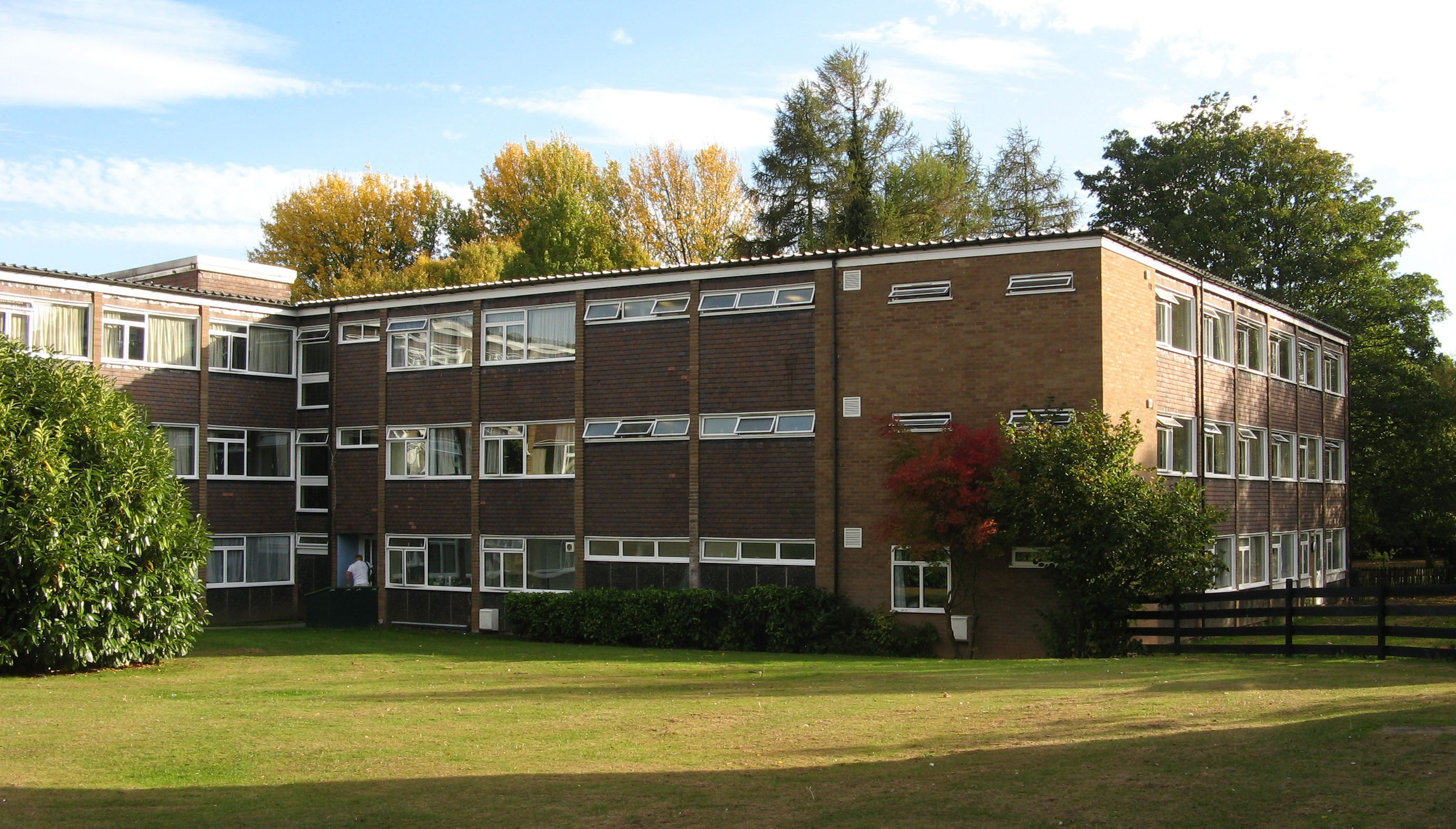
Hampton hall of residence

The eight Halls of Residence have large rooms and so tend to be used by the admissions department at the start of the year to house students who have to share, should a shortage of rooms on campus arise. As of 2007 washing machines and dryers were installed in all the Westwood blocks. Previously all of the Westwood campus were sharing 4 machines in a separate washing building. Former lead singer of The Police, Sting, spent one term at Coventry College of Education, where he stayed in Hampton block. It was falsely claimed for many years that he wrote some of The Police's hit singles while living in Hampton, including Every Breath You Take and Roxanne.

The halls of residence are all named after local locations:

- Bericote
- Compton
- Dunsmere
- Emscote
- Gosford
- Hampton
- Knightcote
- Loxley
