= Estelle Morris =

British Labour politician, life peer

The Right Honourable The Baroness Morris of Yardley PC
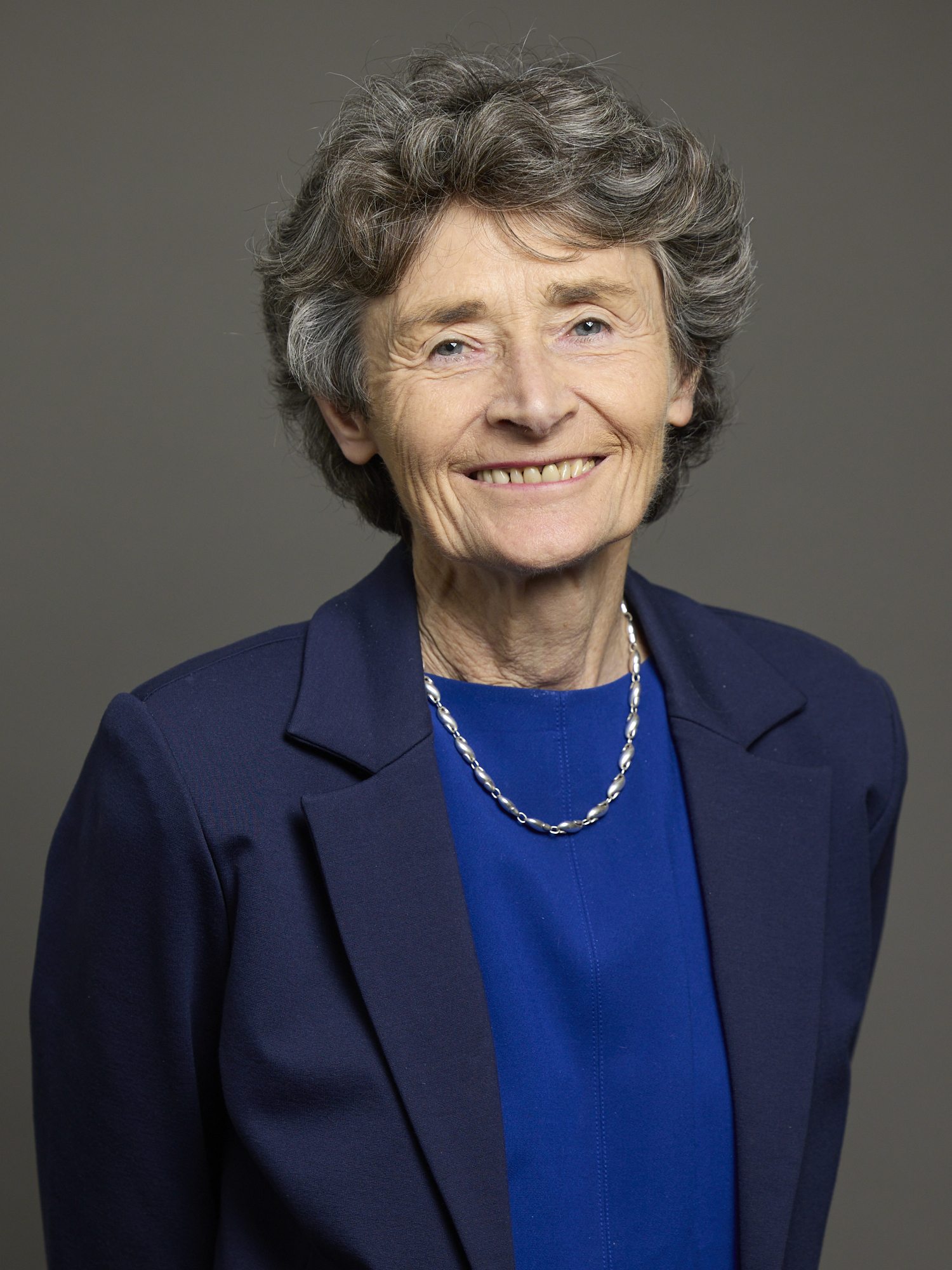
- Official portrait, 2025

Minister of State for the Arts
- In office 13 June 2003 – 5 May 2005
- Prime Minister: Tony Blair
- Preceded by: The Baroness Blackstone
- Succeeded by: David Lammy (Culture)

Secretary of State for Education and Skills
- In office 8 June 2001 – 24 October 2002
- Prime Minister: Tony Blair
- Preceded by: David Blunkett (Education and Employment)
- Succeeded by: Charles Clarke

Minister of State for School Standards
- In office 28 July 1998 – 8 June 2001
- Prime Minister: Tony Blair
- Preceded by: Stephen Byers
- Succeeded by: Stephen Timms

Parliamentary Under-Secretary of State for School Standards
- In office 2 May 1997 – 28 July 1998
- Prime Minister: Tony Blair
- Preceded by: Cheryl Gillan
- Succeeded by: George Mudie

Member of the House of Lords
- Lord Temporal
- Life peerage 14 June 2005

Member of Parliament for Birmingham Yardley
- In office 9 April 1992 – 11 April 2005
- Preceded by: David Bevan
- Succeeded by: John Hemming

Personal details
- Born: Estelle Morris; 17 June 1952 (age 74) Manchester, England
- Party: Labour
- Parent: Charles Morris (father)
- Relatives: Alf Morris (uncle)
- Education: Coventry College of Education

Estelle Morris, Baroness Morris of Yardley, PC (born 17 June 1952), is a British politician and life peer who served as Secretary of State for Education and Skills from 2001 to 2002. A member of the Labour Party, she was Member of Parliament (MP) for Birmingham Yardley from 1992 to 2005.

As Education Secretary, she is known for removing compulsory modern languages from secondary schools in England in 2002.

== Early life ==
Morris was born in Manchester into a political family. Her uncle, Alf Morris, was Labour MP for Manchester Wythenshawe (1964–1997) and her father, Charles, was Labour MP for Manchester Openshaw (1963–1983) and a Post Office union official who married Pauline Dunn. She attended Rack House primary school in Wythenshawe and Whalley Range Grammar School in Whalley Range where she failed her English and French A-levels.

She is a graduate of the Coventry College of Education, where she gained a BEd degree in 1974. Morris remembered the long-serving principal, Joan Dillon Browne (1912–2009), as "a pioneer in showing what women could achieve, long before it was fashionable to do so". Morris was a PE and humanities teacher at the inner-city Sidney Stringer School in Coventry from 1974 to 1992, becoming head of sixth form studies, and was a member of Warwick District Council from 1979 to 1991.

== Parliamentary career ==
Morris was elected to Parliament in 1992 for Birmingham Yardley, gaining the seat from the Conservatives with a majority of only 162. She became a minister in the Department for Education and Employment in 1997 and was promoted to Secretary of State for Education and Skills in 2001. She was the first former comprehensive school teacher to have the position. She suddenly resigned her post in October 2002, explaining that she did not feel up to the job. She had made a commitment to the then Conservative Shadow Education Secretary, David Willetts to resign if the literacy and numeracy targets were not met. In interviews following her resignation she stated that she had felt happier and more effective as a junior education minister.

She rejoined the government in 2003 as Minister for the Arts in the Department for Culture, Media and Sport, and caused further comment when she admitted that she did not know much about contemporary art. She stepped down from the government and as a Member of Parliament at the 2005 general election. Her constituency was gained by the Liberal Democrats at that election.

On 13 May 2005 it was announced that she would be created a life peer, and she was conferred as Baroness Morris of Yardley, of Yardley in the County of West Midlands, on 14 June 2005.

== Career outside Parliament ==
Between 2005 and 2009 she was pro vice-chancellor of the University of Sunderland. In May 2005, she was appointed chair of the Children's Workforce Development Council. In September 2005, it was announced that she would succeed Lady Kennedy of The Shaws as president of the National Children's Bureau. Also, since September 2005 she has been a member of the council of Goldsmiths, University of London and she was chair of council until 2018. Since 2007 she has been chair of the executive group of the Institute for Effective Education at the University of York.

Morris is the chair of the medical charity APS Support UK, which researches antiphospholipid syndrome, and was patron of Hanover Foundations.

== Awards ==
In 2004, Morris was awarded an honorary D.A. degree from Leeds Metropolitan University and an honorary D.Ed. degree from the University of Wolverhampton. She received an honorary D.Litt. degree from the University of Bradford on 21 July 2005, and the University of Chester on 18 March 2011, on 18 July 2007 she was awarded an honorary D.Ed. degree by Manchester Metropolitan University in recognition of her contribution to education throughout a lifelong career as a dedicated teacher and politician with an education portfolio that has spanned 10 years. She was awarded an honorary fellowship in 2007 from the University of Cumbria.

Parliament of the United Kingdom
Preceded by David Bevan	Member of Parliament for Birmingham Yardley; 1992–2005	Succeeded by John Hemming
Political offices
Preceded by David Blunkett as Secretary of State for Education and Employment	Secretary of State for Education and Skills; 2001–2002	Succeeded by Charles Clarke
Preceded by The Baroness Blackstone	Minister of State for the Arts; 2003–2005	Succeeded by David Lammy as Minister of State for Culture
