= NHS University =

The NHS University (NHSU) was a part of the United Kingdom's National Health Service tasked with training NHS staff. It was abolished in 2005.

The NHSU was proposed by the Labour Party in the lead up to the 2001 general election, which was followed by a consultation exercise between November 2002 and May 2003. The organisation was launched in December 2003 as a special health authority.

At its launch, its main aims were to improve the training of NHS staff by:

1. creating and improving opportunities for learning,
2. creating high quality learning environments,
3. leading research into future learning needs.

The organisation claimed to have made much progress on achieving these aims with the creation of a large number of different training programmes and the setting up of a training helpline for staff called the u-i.

However, with the publication of the "Reconfiguring the Department of Health's arm's length bodies" report in July 2004, it was decided to reduce the number and size of the Special Health Authorities in order to bring about efficiency savings. On 30 September 2004, the then Secretary of State for Health, John Reid, announced that the NHSU would be merged with the NHS Modernisation Agency to form the new NHS Institute for Learning, Skills and Innovation, now NHS Institute for Innovation and Improvement. This merging would allow the cutting of staff from 1,500 to 300 people.

The NHSU was officially dissolved on 31 July 2005, with its 23 remaining learning programmes being transferred to the Skills for Health organisation by 29 September 2005.

In 2007, following a two-year campaign under the Freedom of Information Act 2000, the report written by Sir William Wells, into the NHSU was released. This described the cost of the organisation and management failures.
