= Automotive Council UK =

UK organisation

The Automotive Council UK is a UK industry-run organisation that oversees the combined strategy of the whole UK automotive industry, in collaboration with the UK government.

== History ==
The organization was formed in 2009.

== Structure ==
The organization is headquartered in the City of Westminster on Great Peter Street near Channel 4. The council is composed of people in the UK government, and chief executives in the automotive industry.

== Function ==
Automotive Council UK produces reports on the UK automotive industry in collaboration with the UK government, mainly the Department for Business, Energy and Industrial Strategy.
