= Jane Bennett (political theorist) =

American political theorist (born 1957)

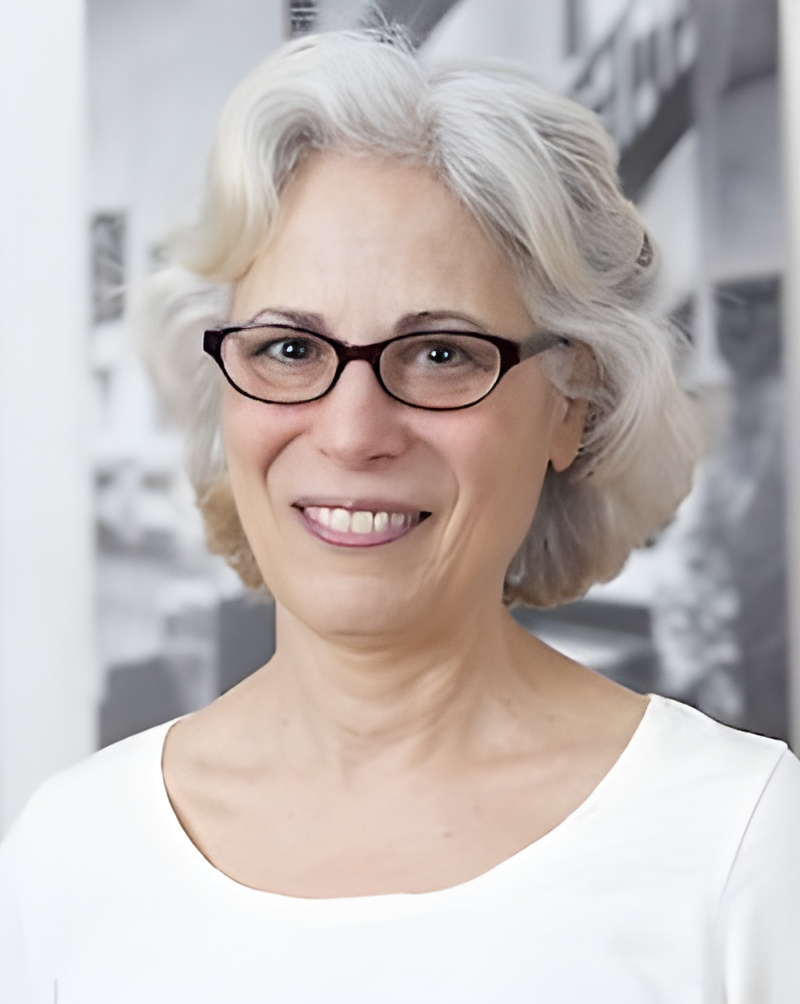
- Born: 31 July 1957 (age 69)

Education
- Education: Siena College; University of Massachusetts

Philosophical work
- Era: Contemporary philosophy
- Region: Western philosophy
- School: Continental philosophy Speculative realism New materialism
- Institutions: Johns Hopkins University School of Arts and Sciences
- Main interests: Political philosophy
- Notable ideas: Vibrant matter, vital materialism

Jane Bennett (born July 31, 1957) is an American political theorist and philosopher. She is the Andrew W. Mellon Professor of the Humanities at the Department of Political Science, Johns Hopkins University School of Arts and Sciences. She was also the editor of the academic journal Political Theory between 2012 and 2017.

== Education ==
Jane Bennett originally trained in environmental studies and political science. She graduated magna cum laude in 1979 from Siena College in Loudonville, New York. Whilst at Siena College Bennett met Kathy Ferguson. Bennett then went on to the University of Massachusetts, where she earned a Ph.D. political science in 1986.

== Philosophical work ==
Bennett's work considers ontological ideas about the relationship between humans and 'things', what she calls "vital materialism":

What counts as the material of vital materialism? Is it only human labour and the socio-economic entities made by men using raw materials? Or is materiality more potent than that? How can political theory do a better job of recognizing the active participation of nonhuman forces in every event and every stabilization? Is there a form of theory that can acknowledge a certain ‘thing-power’, that is, the irreducibility of objects to the human meanings or agendas they also embody?

In her most frequently cited book, Vibrant Matter: A Political Ecology of Things, Bennett's argument is that, "Edibles, commodities, storms, and metals act as quasi agents, with their own trajectories, potentialities and tendencies.". Bennett has also published books on American authors Henry David Thoreau and Walt Whitman.

Public lectures she has given include "Impersonal Sympathy", a talk theorizing 'sympathy' in which she considered the alchemist-physician Paracelsus and Walt Whitman's collection of poetry, Leaves of Grass.

In 2015, Bennett delivered the annual Neal A. Maxwell Lecture in Political Theory and Contemporary Politics at the University of Utah entitled “Walt Whitman and the Soft Voice of Sympathy.”

== Fellowships ==
- 1997 - Visiting Fellow, Department of Politics, Goucher College, Australian National University
- 2007 - Visiting Fellow, Department of Politics, University of Nottingham
- 2010 - Fellow, Birkbeck Institute for the Humanities, University of London
- 2011 - Fellow, Oxford University, Keble College
- 2017 - Fellow, Bauhaus University, Internationales Kolleg fur Kulturtechnikforschung und Medienphilosophie

== Bibliography ==
=== Books ===
- Bennett, Jane (1987). Unthinking Faith and Enlightenment: Nature and the State in a Post-Hegelian Era. New York: New York University Press. ISBN 9780814710951.
- Bennett, Jane (2001). The Enchantment of Modern Life: Attachments, Crossings, and Ethics. Princeton, New Jersey: Princeton University Press. ISBN 9780691088136.
- Bennett, Jane (2002). Thoreau's Nature: Ethics, Politics, and the Wild (2nd ed.). Lanham, Maryland: Rowman & Littlefield. ISBN 9780742521414.
- Bennett, Jane (2010). Vibrant Matter: A Political Ecology of Things. Durham, North Carolina: Duke University Press. ISBN 9780822346197.

Book review: Princen, Thomas (March 2011). "Critical Dialogue - "Vibrant Matter: A Political Ecology of Things." By Jane Bennett. Durham, NC: Duke University Press, 2010. 176p. $74.95 cloth, $21.95 paper". Perspectives on Politics. 9 (1): 118–120. doi:10.1017/S1537592710003464. S2CID 144328266.

Bennett's response to five book reviews of Vibrant Matter: A Political Ecology of Things: Bennett, Jane (November 2011). "Author response". Dialogues in Human Geography. 1 (3): 404–406. doi:10.1177/204382061100100310. S2CID 220591219.

- Bennett, Jane (2020). Influx and Efflux: Writing Up with Walt Whitman. Duke University Press. ISBN 978-1478007791.

=== Edited books ===
- Bennett, Jane; Chaloupka, William (1993). In the Nature of Things: Language, Politics, and the Environment. Minneapolis: University of Minnesota Press. ISBN 9780816623082.
- Bennett, Jane; Shapiro, Michael J. (2002). The Politics of Moralizing. New York: Routledge. ISBN 9780415934787.

=== Book chapters ===
- Bennett, Jane; Shapiro, Michael J. (2002), "Introduction", in Bennett, Jane; Shapiro, Michael J. (eds.), The politics of moralizing, New York: Routledge, pp. 1–10, ISBN 9780415934787
- Bennett, Jane (2002), "The Moraline Drift", in Bennett, Jane; Shapiro, Michael J. (eds.), The Politics of Moralizing, New York: Routledge, pp. 11–26, ISBN 9780415934787
- Bennett, Jane; Connolly, William E. (2002), "Mouths, bodies and the state", in Honig, Bonnie; Mapel, David R. (eds.), Skepticism, Individuality, and Freedom: The Reluctant Liberalism of Richard Flathman, Minneapolis: University of Minnesota Press, pp. 244–265, ISBN 9780816639700
- Bennett, Jane (2004), "Approaches to Contemporary Political Theory", in Kukathas, Chandran; Gaus, Gerald F. (eds.), Handbook of Political Theory, London Thousand Oaks, California: SAGE, pp. 46–56, ISBN 9780761967873
- Bennett, Jane (2005), "In parliament with things", in Tønder, Lars; Thomassen, Lasse (eds.), Radical Democracy: Politics between Abundance and Lack, Manchester New York: Manchester University Press, ISBN 9780719070440
- Bennett, Jane (2006), "The Agency of Assemblages and the North American Blackout", in de Vries, Hent; Sullivan, Lawrence E. (eds.), Political Theologies: Public Religions in a Post-Secular World, New York: Fordham University Press, pp. 602–616, ISBN 9780823226450
- Bennett, Jane (2008), "Modernity and its Critics", in Phillips, Anne; Bonnie, Honig; Dryzek, John S. (eds.), The Oxford Handbook of Political Theory, Oxford: Oxford University Press, ISBN 9780199548439
- Bennett, Jane (2009), "Thoreau's Techniques of Self", in Turner, Jack (ed.), A Political Companion to Henry David Thoreau, Lexington, Kentucky: University Press of Kentucky, pp. 294–325, ISBN 9780813124780
- Bennett, Jane (2009), "Thing-Power and an Ecological Sublime", in White, Luke; Pajaczkowska, Claire (eds.), The Sublime Now, Newcastle upon Tyne: Cambridge Scholars, pp. 24–35, ISBN 9781443813020
- Bennett, Jane (2010), "A vitalist stopover on the way to a new materialism", in Coole, Diana; Frost, Samantha (eds.), New Materialisms: Ontology, Agency, and Politics, Durham North Carolina London: Duke University Press, pp. 47–69, ISBN 9780822347729
- Bennett, Jane (2010), "Thing-Power", in Whatmore, Sarah; Braun, Bruce (eds.), Political Matter: Technoscience, Democracy, and Public Life, Minneapolis, Minnesota: University of Minnesota Press, ISBN 9780816670895
- Bennett, Jane (2011), "Thing-Power", in Seery, John (ed.), A Political Companion to Walt Whitman, Lexington, Kentucky: University Press of Kentucky, pp. 131–148, ISBN 9780813126548
- Bennett, Jane (2012), "Thing-Power", in Elkins, Jeremy; Norris, Andrew (eds.), Truth and Democracy, Philadelphia: University of Pennsylvania Press, pp. 154–158, ISBN 9780812243796
- Bennett, Jane (2012), "Powers of the Hoard: Further Notes on Material Agency", in Cohen, Jeffrey (ed.), Animal, Vegetable, Mineral: Ethics and Objects, Washington, DC: Oliphaunt Books an imprint of Punctum Books, pp. 237–269, ISBN 9780615625355

Abridged version printed (along with an 'assignment') as: Bennett, Jane (2013), "Powers of the hoard: further notes on material agency", in Sutela, Jenna (ed.), Add metaphysics: essays and assignments, Aalto, Finland: Aalto University Digital Design Laboratory, pp. 52–67, ISBN 9789526049540 Open access link.

- Bennett, Jane; Connolly, William (2012), "The Crumpled Handkerchief", in Herzogenrath, Bernd (ed.), Time and History in Deleuze and Serres, New York: Continuum, pp. 153–172, ISBN 9781441163868
- Bennett, Jane (2012), "Stones", in Sæbjörnsson, Egill; Herzogenrath, Bernd (eds.), Stones According to Egill Sæbjörnsson, New York: Revolver Publishing / Continuum, pp. 27–36, ISBN 9781441163868
- Bennett, Jane; Connolly, William (2013), "Earthling: Now and Forever?", in Ellsworth, Elizabeth; Kruse, Jaime (eds.), Making the Geologic Now: Responses to Material Conditions of Contemporary Life, Brooklyn, New York: Punctum Books, pp. 244–246, ISBN 9780615766362
- Bennett, Jane (2013), "From Nature to Matter", in Archer, Crina; Ephraim, Laura; Maxwell, Lida (eds.), Second Nature: Rethinking the Natural Through Politics, New York: Fordham University Press, pp. 149–160, ISBN 9780823251421
- Bennett, Jane (2014), "Of Material Sympathies, Paracelsus, and Whitman", in Iovino, Serenella; Oppermann, Serpil (eds.), Material Ecocriticism, Bloomington: Indiana University Press, pp. 149–160, ISBN 9780253013958

Revised and reprinted as Bennett, Jane (2015), "Of sympathies alchemical and poetic", Rare Earth, Vienna: Tyssen-Bornemisza Art Contemporary, pp. 112–118

- Bennett, Jane (2014), "The shapes of Odradek and the edges of perception", in Klingan, Katrin; Sepahvand, Ashkan; Rosol, Christoph; Scherer, Bernd M. (eds.), Grain/Vapor/Ray: Textures of the Anthropocene, Berlin: Haus der Kulturen der Welt
- Bennett, Jane (2014), "Systems and Things: A Reply to Graham Harman and Timothy Morton", in Grusin, Richard (ed.), The Nonhuman Turn, Minnesota: University of Minnesota Press - forthcoming.
- Bennett, Jane (2014), "Green Materialism", in Kennedy, T. Frank; Keenan, James (eds.), Nature as a Force: Scientists, Social Scientists, and Ethicists in a Dialogue of Hope, Toronto, Canada: University of Toronto Press - forthcoming.
- Bennett, Jane (2017), "Vegetal Life and OntoSympathy", in Keller, Catherine; Rubenstein, Mary-Jane (eds.), Entangled Worlds: Religion, Science, and New Materialisms, Fordham University Press, pp. 89–110
- Bennett, Jane (2017), "Vibrant matter", in Braidotti, Rosi; Hlavajova, M. (eds.), Posthuman Glossary, Bloomsbury Publishers

=== Journal articles ===
- Bennett, Jane (Spring 2000). "De Rerum Natura". Strategies. 13 (1): 9–22. doi:10.1080/10402130050007494.

Also occasionally referred to with the alternative title "The order of nature in Lucretius", this article discusses De rerum natura (On the Nature of Things) by Lucretius.

- Bennett, Jane (Spring 2000). "Sometimes it's okay to be weak: reply to Stephen White". Theory & Event. 4 (2).

This article was a response to: White, Stephen K. (Spring 2000). "Affirmation and weak ontology in political theory: some rules and doubts". Theory & Event. 4 (2).

- Bennett, Jane (Winter 2001). "Commodity fetishism and commodity enchantment". Theory & Event. 5 (1). doi:10.1353/tae.2001.0006. S2CID 144361800.
- Bennett, Jane (June 2004). "The force of things: steps toward an ecology of matter". Political Theory. 32 (3): 347–372. doi:10.1177/0090591703260853. S2CID 146366679.
- Bennett, Jane (Fall 2005). "The agency of assemblages and the North American blackout public culture". Public Culture. 17 (3): 445–466. doi:10.1215/08992363-17-3-445.
- Bennett, Jane (May–June 2007). "Edible matter". New Left Review. 2 (45).
- Bennett, Jane; Marrati, Paola (translator, French) (2008). "Matérialismes métalliques". Rue Descartes 81. 59 (1). Archived from the original on 25 March 2019.
- Bennett, Jane; Livingston, Alexander (December 2011). "Philosophy in the wild: listening to things in Baltimore". Scapegoat: Architecture, Landscape, Political Economy: 02 Materialism (2). Scapegoat: 12–13. Available via the co-author Alexander Livingston on Academia.edu.
- Bennett, Jane (Spring 2012). "Systems and things: a response to Graham Harman and Timothy Morton". New Literary History. 43 (2): 225–233. doi:10.1353/nlh.2012.0020. S2CID 144395464.

This article was in response to: Harman, Graham (Spring 2012). "The well-wrought broken hammer: object-oriented literary criticism". New Literary History. 43 (2): 183–203. doi:10.1353/nlh.2012.0016. S2CID 145048580.
and: Morton, Timothy (Spring 2012). "An object-oriented defense of poetry". New Literary History. 43 (2): 205–224. doi:10.1353/nlh.2012.0018. S2CID 170397563.

- Bennett, Jane (Spring 2013). "The elements". Postmedieval. 4 (1): 105–111. doi:10.1057/pmed.2012.39. S2CID 195217226.
- Bennett, Jane (2015). "Encounters with an art-thing" (PDF). Evental Aesthetics. 3 (3): 91–110.
- Bennett, Jane; Washick, Bonnie; Wingrove, Elizabeth; Ferguson, Kathy E. (February 2015). "Politics that matter: thinking about power and justice with the new materialists". Contemporary Political Theory. 14 (1): 63–89. doi:10.1057/cpt.2014.19. S2CID 145671868.
- Bennett, Jane (September 2016). "Whitman's sympathies". Political Research Quarterly. 69 (3): 607–620. doi:10.1177/1065912916656824. S2CID 151664131.
- Bennett, Jane (December 2017). "Mimesis: Paradox or encounter". MLN. 132 (5): 1186–1200. doi:10.1353/mln.2017.0091. S2CID 165619743.
- (Forthcoming) Bennett, Jane (2019). "Out for a walk". Zeitschrift für Kultur und Medienforschung. 10: 93–105. doi:10.28937/1000108235. S2CID 213271406.

=== Blog posts ===
- Bennett, Jane (18 August 2010). "On the call from outside". The Immanent Frame. Social Science Research Council. Archived from the original on 29 July 2014.

=== Published interviews ===
- Khan, Gulshan (February 2009). "Agency, nature and emergent properties". Contemporary Political Theory. 8 (1): 90–105. doi:10.1057/CPT.2008.43. S2CID 144483000.

Revised and reprinted as Khan, Gulshan (2012), "Vital materiality and non-human agency: an interview with Jane Bennett", in Prokhovnik, Raia; Browning, Gary; Dimova-Cookson, Maria (eds.), Dialogues with contemporary political theorists, Houndsmill, Basingstoke, Hampshire New York: Palgrave Macmillan, pp. 42–58, ISBN 9780230303058

- Bennett, Jane; Loenhart, Klaus K. (2011), "Vibrant matter - zero landscape: interview with Jane Bennett", in Bélanger, Pierre (ed.), GAM 07: Zero landscape: unfolding active agencies of landscape (Graz Architektur Magazin Graz Architecture Magazine) (German and English Edition), Wein New York: Fakultät für Architektur Technische Universität Graz, ISBN 9783709105368 Also printed as: Bennett, Jane; Loenhart, Klaus K. (19 October 2011). "Vibrant matter - zero landscape: interview with Jane Bennett". Eurozine. Archived from the original on 22 July 2014.
- Watson, Janell (October 2013). "Eco-sensibilities: interview with Jane Bennett". Minnesota Review. 81 (1): 147–158. doi:10.1215/00265667-2332147. S2CID 145051920.
- (Forthcoming) "Interview with Jane Bennett". LA+: Interdisciplinary Journal of Landscape Architecture (11 (Vitality)). Spring 2020.
