= Assemblage (philosophy) =

Philosophical concept of social action

Assemblage (from everyday French: agencement, "arrangement, layout") is a philosophical concept developed by Gilles Deleuze and Félix Guattari. It refers to a set of connections that come together for a period of time and produce a recognizable behavior or effect. Deleuze and Guattari refer to the connections which make up an assemblage as 'lines', such as a line of flight.

The concept has subsequently been taken up by other theorists, such as Bruno Latour, Madeleine Akrich and Michel Callon who developed actor–network theory, Manuel DeLanda in his work on assemblage theory, and Jane Bennett who combines Latour with Deleuze and Guattari forming her own assemblage theory. Bennett’s assemblage thinking has influenced environmental philosophy (e.g. Timothy Morton’s Hyperobjects), political theory (e.g. William Connolly’s work on complexity and politics), and new materialism (e.g. Rosi Braidotti, Karen Barad).

Assemblage is a philosophical concept used when studying ontological diversity of agency, which means redistributing the capacity to act from an individual to a socio-material network of people, things, and narratives. Also known as assemblage theory or assemblage thinking, this philosophical approach frames social complexity through fluidity, exchangeability, and their connectivity. The central thesis is that people do not act predominantly according to personal agency; rather, human action requires material interdependencies and networks of discursive devices distributed across legal, geographical, cultural, or economic infrastructures.

The similarities among these versions include a relational view of social reality in which human action results from shifting interdependencies between material, narrative, social, and geographic elements. The theories have in common an account for emergent qualities that result from associations between human and non-human. In other words, an assemblage approach asserts that, within a body, the relationships of component parts are not stable and fixed; rather, they can be displaced and replaced within and among other bodies, thus approaching systems through relations of exteriority.

== Overview ==
The term "assemblage", as conceived by Deleuze and Guattari, originally stems from the French word agencement, whose meaning translates narrowly to English as "arrangement", "fitting", or "fixing". Agencement asserts the inherent implication of the connection between specific concepts and that the arrangement of those concepts is what provides sense or meaning. Assemblage, on the other hand, can be more accurately described as the integration and connection of these concepts and that it is both the connections and the arrangements of those connections that provide context for assigned meanings. Assemblage might be viewed in contrast to intersectionality: an intersectional analysis takes people's formed identities as objects of study, while assemblage theory considers how people are positioned or arranged such that those identities emerge. One can consider not only what it means to be a Black woman but also how she is racialized and sexed, how racism and sexism are organized around her to produce her particular experience as a Black woman. To complement intersectionality and its focus on the identity of a subject (in a sense, its "content"), Jasbir Puar offers "ask[ing] not necessarily what assemblages are, but rather, what assemblages do".

John Phillips (2006) argues that Deleuze and Guattari rarely used the term "assemblage" at all in a philosophical sense, and that through narrow, literal English translations, the terms "agencement" and "assemblage" became misleadingly perceived as analogous. The translation of "agencement" as "assemblage" can "give rise to connotations based on analogical impressions, which liberate elements of a vocabulary from the arguments that once helped form it."

== Deleuze and Guattari ==
In Deleuze and Guattari's theory, an assemblage is a dynamic, heterogeneous collection of elements that come together (articulate) in varying speeds to form a temporary, functional whole that has effects. Assemblages emerge through processes of coding and territorialization that can undergo stratification (formation), deterritorialization (de-formation), and reterritorialization. Assemblages are not fixed structures or essential identities; they are constantly shifting, evolving, and adapting based on the interactions (articulations) of their components.

"In a book, as in all things, there are lines of articulation or segmentarity, strata and territories; but also lines of flight, movements of deterritorialization and destratification. Comparative rates of flow on these lines produce phenomena of relative slowness and viscosity, or, on the contrary, of acceleration and rupture. All this, lines and measurable speeds, constitutes an assemblage" (pp., 3–4).

Assemblages are articulations (connections) that are contingent (not determined), temporal (subject to historical processes) connections that form events, happenings, thus have effects. They are events in process, becomings, or in flux that stabilise (territorialise) but are only metastable insofar as they can change, mutate and form new formations depending on their articulations. Articulations, describing ways singularities structure and function within an assemblage, involve two aspects: (1) content (the material, physical, and functional aspects of an assemblage) and (2) expression (the semiotic, symbolic, and representational aspects of an assemblage) function together to structure reality. As Deleuze and Guattari suggest, "content and expression are two variables of a function of stratification. They not only vary from one stratum to another, but intermingle, and within the same stratum multiply and divide ad infinitum."

Assemblages are constellations like the Milky Way: multiplicities of singularities (ensemble de singularités). Multiplicities are not beings, but becomings. They are structures that are not fixed essential identities; instead, they are open, non-hierarchical constellations that gain meaning via the interactions of their articulations and their effects. Singularities are unique points, events, or intensities (as dynamic tendencies, not extensive structures) that do not form fixed identities or essences rather dynamic and emergent effects. Singularities thus allow for variation, diversity, and difference that emerge depending on how singularities are articulated in a formation's circumstances and the dynamic interactions of those singularities. A constellation, as an assemblage, is made up of multiplicities and articulations of heterogeneous elements and singularities.

Assemblages are metastable formations, not fixed atemporal events. They exist in a metastable state that has the potential to change given certain circumstances. The process of structuring and organizing matter into a functional assemblage is called coding or stratifying, but coding is always accompanied by processes of decoding and deterritorialization that destabilize or transform assemblages. When assemblages become rigid and overcoded, they stratify and territorialize into stabilized constellations such as symbolic law, polis, or era. However, assemblages may deterritorialise and escape from stratifing structures to create new assemblages. Even though assemblages may undergo processes of coding, they also involve decoding and deterritorialization, preventing them from being reduced to a single identity. Assemblages select and compose elements to form a territory, but this process is never final. Assemblages are always subject to reterritorialization and deterritorialization:

"Strata are acts of capture, they are like "black holes" or occlusions striving to seize whatever comes within their reach. They operate by coding and territorialization upon the earth; they proceed simultaneously by code and by territoriality. The strata are judgments of God; stratification in general is the entire system of the judgment of God (but the earth, or the body without organs, constantly eludes that judgment, flees and becomes destratified, decoded, deterritorialized)" (p., 40).

Drawing from the constellation metaphor, Deleuze and Guattari argue that the constellation includes some heavenly bodies but leaves out others; the included bodies being those in close proximity given the particular gathering and angle of view. The example constellation thus defines the relationships with the bodies in and around it, and therefore demonstrates the social complexity of assemblage.

Territorialization is another process of assemblage theory, and is viewed as the ordering of the bodies that create the "assemblage". Assemblages territorialize both forms of content and forms of expression. Forms of content, also known as material forms, include the assemblage of human and nonhuman bodies, actions, and reactions. Forms of expression include incorporeal enunciations, acts, and statements. Within this ordering of the bodies, assemblages do not remain static; they are further characterized by processes of deterritorialization and reterritorialization. Deterritorialization occurs when articulations are disarticulated and disconnected through components "exiting" the assemblage; once again exemplifying the idea that these forms do not and cannot operate alone. Reterritorialization describes the process by which new components "enter" and new articulations are forged, thus constituting a new assemblage. In this way, these axes of content/expressive and the processes of territorialization exist to demonstrate the complex nature of assemblages.

== DeLanda ==
Manuel DeLanda detailed the concept of assemblage in his book A New Philosophy of Society (2006) where, like Deleuze and Guattari, he suggests that social bodies on all scales are best analyzed through their individual components. Like Deleuze and Guattari, DeLanda’s approach examines relations of exteriority, in which assemblage components are self-subsistent and retain autonomy outside of the assemblage in which they exist DeLanda details Deleuze and Guattari's (1987) assemblage theory of how assemblage components are organized through the two axes of material/expressive and territorializing/deterritorializing. DeLanda's additional contribution is to suggest that a third axis exists: of genetic/linguistic resources that also defines the interventions involved in the coding, decoding, and recoding of the assemblage. Like Deleuze and Guattari, DeLanda suggests that the social does not lose its reality, nor its materiality, through its complexity. In this way, assemblages are effective in their practicality; assemblages, though fluid, are nevertheless part of historically significant processes.
