= Weak ontology (political concept) =

Political concept

In political theory, weak ontology describes a pragmatic approach that seeks to avoid foundationalist commitments of the classic sort (which it calls 'strong ontology'), yet acknowledges the indispensable role of an ontological imaginary implicit in every act of political theorizing (both critical and normative). 'Weak ontology' makes explicit and affirms one's ontological commitments (and assumptions) but at the same time acknowledges their historical, contestable character. The term was first used in this context by Stephen K. White, professor of politics at the University of Virginia, who ascribes this approach to thinkers such as William E. Connolly, George Kateb, Judith Butler, and Charles Taylor.

== Overview ==
An early version of this approach was pioneered by William E. Connolly, who White calls "the most conscious contemporary articulator of weak ontology." In his 1987 work Politics and Ambiguity, Connolly argues that it is impossible to conceptualize politics without calling on an underlying ‘social ontology’. He there defined social ontology as "a set of fundamental understandings about the relation of humans to themselves, to others, and to the world". Eight years later, in his 1995 work Ethos of Pluralization, Connolly expands his thesis, elaborating his famous claim that all political interpretations are, in fact, "ontopolitical".

Elaborating on the concept of 'ontopolitics', Connolly writes: "Onta, the really existing things; ontology, the study of the fundamental logic of reality apart from appearances. These determinations are both too restrictive and too total for what I have in mind. For example, the logos in ontology already suggests a fundamental logic, principle, or design of being. But it can and has been urged that the most fundamental thing about being is that it contains no such overriding logic or design. 'Ontopolitical interpretation' may come closer, then. Onto, because every political interpretation invokes a set of fundaments about necessities and possibilities of human being, about, for instance, the forms into which humans may be composed and the possible relations humans can establish with nature. An ontopolitical stance, for instance, might strive to articulate a law or design set into the very order of things. Or it might deny the existence of a law or natural design while still identifying a profound stability of human interests that persists across time. Or it might deflate this theme of stable human interests while striving to draw us closer to a protean abundance that enables and exceeds every socially constructed order. To say either that something is fundamental or that nothing is fundamental, then, is to engage in ontopolitical interpretation. Hence, every interpretation of political events, no matter how deeply it is sunk in a specific historical context or how high the pile of data upon which it sits, contains an ontopolitical dimension. Political interpretation is ontopolitical: its fundamental presumptions fix possibilities, distribute explanatory elements, generate parameters within which an ethic is elaborated, and center (or decenter) assessments of identity, legitimacy, and responsibility. But this dimension is today not often an explicit object of critical attention in the human sciences." (1995: 1–2).

Both Connolly and White emphasize that this dimension is both "fundamental and irredeemably contestable".
