= Austin E. Quigley =

American educator (born 1942)

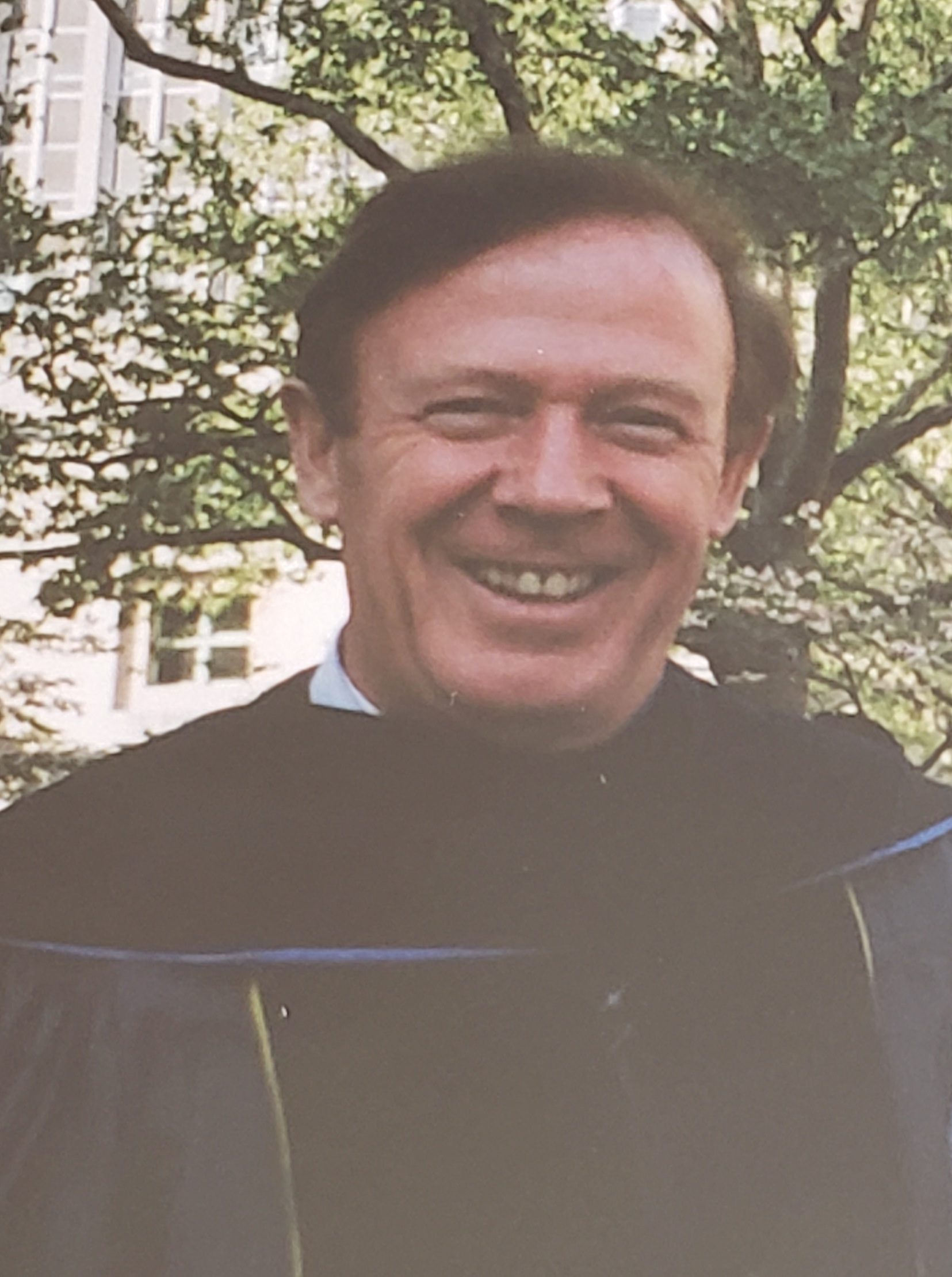
- Born: December 31, 1942 (age 83)
- Citizenship: United States
- Education: University of Nottingham (BA); University of Birmingham (MA); University of California, Santa Cruz (PhD)
- Occupations: Professor and academic administrator
- Employer: Columbia University
- Known for: Dean of Columbia College of Columbia University
- Board member of: Modern Drama; New Literary History; The Pinter Review
- Spouse: Patricia D. Denison
- Children: 4

Austin Edmund Quigley (born December 31, 1942) is the Dean Emeritus of Columbia College of Columbia University and Brander Matthews Professor of Dramatic Literature at Columbia University, in New York City. He was the recipient of the 2008 Alexander Hamilton Medal, Columbia College's highest honor. He is also a member of the Oscar Hammerstein II Center for Theatre Studies and of the Columbia University Doctoral Program Subcommittee on Theatre, has served on the editorial boards of Modern Drama, New Literary History, The Pinter Review.

== Early life and education ==
Austin E. Quigley was born the second of five children, to school teachers Edmund and Marguerita Quigley, on December 31, 1942, in Northumberland, in Northern England, and later moved to the area of Newcastle.

Before he became an academic, Quigley's "first ambition was a career in professional soccer, and he played as a teenager for the junior team of one of England's premier clubs, Newcastle United," and also played "varsity soccer for Nottingham University and while a student there was selected to represent the county of Nottinghamshire."

He earned a BA in English literature at the University of Nottingham in 1967, an MA in Modern Linguistics at Birmingham University, in 1969, and, after moving to the United States in 1969, a PhD in English and Comparative Literature and Literary Theory at the University of California, Santa Cruz, in 1971, where he was the recipient of a Danforth Fellowship.

In 1975, a revised version of his doctoral dissertation, "The Dynamics of Dialogue: A Study of the Plays of Harold Pinter", was published by Princeton University Press as his first book, The Pinter Problem.

== Academic career ==
Quigley's first teaching position was at the University of Massachusetts Amherst, in Amherst, Massachusetts, where he worked for two years before moving to the University of Virginia, where he chaired the English department before leaving to become H. Gordon Garbedian Professor of English and Comparative Literature at Columbia University in 1990. He also held visiting appointments at the University of Geneva, in Switzerland; the University of Konstanz, in Germany; and the University of Nottingham, in England.

In addition to helping to found the undergraduate major in Drama and Theatre at Columbia University and Barnard College, he also reconstructed and renewed "the Ph.D. and M.F.A. programs in theater." He became associate director of the Columbia University Oscar Hammerstein II Center for Theatre Studies in 1992 and chairman of the Lionel Trilling Seminars in 1993.

=== Dean of Columbia College ===
In 1995, Quigely was named the 14th Dean of Columbia College. He briefly resigned as dean in July 1997, but returned as dean less than a week later.

In 2009, Quigley retired as Dean of Columbia College.

Beginning in academic year 2009–10, he "continue[d] to teach at Columbia and conduct research as the Brander Matthews Professor of Dramatic Literature and also will serve as special adviser to the president [of Columbia University] for undergraduate education."

His scholarly and critical specialities explore "the nature and status of explanatory frameworks in literary studies, and his work has focused on the interface between literary and linguistic theory and modern philosophy of language," the plays of Harold Pinter, and related topics in modern drama and theatre. When he became Dean of Columbia College in 1995, he had completed writing Theoretical Inquiry: Language, Linguistics, and Literary Studies, in which "he explores the capacity of theory to clarify the unexpected rather than confirm the presupposed," which was published by Yale University Press in 2004.

== Personal life ==
Quigley lives in New York with his wife, Patricia Denison, a senior lecturer in English at Columbia University's Barnard College. The couple have four daughters.

== Selected bibliography ==
Articles and parts of books

- "Creativity and Commitment in Trevor Griffith's Comedians". Modern Drama 24 (1981): 404–23.
- "The Dumb Waiter: Undermining the Tacit Dimension". Modern Drama 21 (1978): 1–11.
- "Pinter, Politics and Postmodernism (I)". 7–27 in The Cambridge Companion to Harold Pinter. Ed. and introd. Peter Raby. Cambridge, Eng., and New York: Cambridge UP, 2001. ISBN 0-521-65842-X (10). ISBN 978-0-521-65842-3 (13).

Books

- The Modern Stage and Other Worlds. New York: Methuen, 1985. 221–52. ISBN 0-416-39320-9 (10). ISBN 978-0-416-39320-0 (13).
- The Pinter Problem. Princeton: Princeton UP, 1975. ISBN 0-691-06281-1 (10). ISBN 978-0-691-06281-5 (13).
- Theoretical Inquiry: Language, Linguistics, and Literature. New Haven: Yale UP, 2004. ISBN 0-300-10166-X (10). ISBN 978-0-300-10166-9 (13).

Academic offices
Preceded by Steven Marcus	Dean of Columbia College; 1995–2009	Succeeded by Michele Moody-Adams
