= Glen Newey =

British philosopher (1961–2017)

Glen Francis Newey (30 May 1961 – 30 September 2017) was a political philosopher, last acting as a Professor of Practical Philosophy at the University of Leiden. He previously taught in Brussels at the Université libre de Bruxelles and until 2011 was Professor in the School of Politics, International Relations & Philosophy at Keele University, Staffordshire, England. He was a prominent member of the "Realist" school of political philosophers which also includes such figures as Bernard Williams, John N. Gray, and Raymond Geuss. Newey also wrote extensively about toleration, casting doubt on whether it remains a coherent political ideal in modern liberal-democratic societies.

Newey blogged regularly for the London Review of Books on a range of topics including UK and overseas politics, university politics, finance and culture, taking a strongly critical stance against free-market capitalism and the marketising of higher education. His journalistic articles were often informal in vein; in one article entitled As Useful as a String Condom Newey criticised the British royal family as being of no use any more in modern Britain. His journalistic output also included film and theatre reviews, as well as review essays on political and moral philosophy, and cultural criticism. He was also a strong defender of free speech and of academic freedom.

== Background ==
Glen Newey was educated at Victoria College, Jersey and Jesus College, Cambridge, where he studied History under the supervision of Richard Tuck. After graduating he worked for several years as a schoolteacher in Jersey. He completed Master of Arts and Doctor of Philosophy degrees at the University of York, where his doctoral supervisor was Professor John Horton. Before working at Keele University, Newey had taught at the University of Sussex, University of Strathclyde, University of York, Birkbeck College and the University of Oxford. He also taught at the Université libre de Bruxelles.

== Area of specialisation ==
Glen Newey's main research interests were in political philosophy. His work focuses on toleration, the nature of politics, political morality, including the ethics of deception in public life, security, freedom of speech, and the political theory of Thomas Hobbes. He argues that modern liberalism, as defended by John Rawls and his followers, sidelines politics in favour of a moralised account of public life. Latterly, his work concentrated upon the relationship between security and other political concepts, as well as the nature of politics and the relation between freedom and justice. Political deception was another area of interest. Between 2008 and 2010 he was a research associate at Helsinki Collegium.

Other areas of interest included the concept of security, freedom of speech, Hobbes's political philosophy and the philosophical basis that political systems are built upon. His academic and journalistic output examined liberal views and develops an alternative to them.

== Death ==
Newey died on 30 September 2017 in a boating accident in Rotterdam, Netherlands, involving multiple gas explosions.

== Publications ==
Books

- 2014 Hobbes and Leviathan (expanded second edition (London: Routledge))
- 2013 Toleration in Political Conflict (Cambridge: Cambridge University Press)
- 2008 Hobbes and Leviathan (London: Routledge (Philosophy Guidebooks series))
- 2007 (ed.) Freedom of Expression: counting the costs (Cambridge: Cambridge Scholars Press)
- 2006 The Political Theory of John Gray (London: Routledge) (ed. with John Horton)
- 2001 After Politics: the Rejection of Politics in Contemporary Liberal Philosophy (London: Palgrave)
- 1999 Virtue, Reason, and the Politics of Toleration: the place of toleration in ethical and political philosophy (Edinburgh: Edinburgh University Press)

Journal editions

- 2007 Res Publica 13 (i), special issue on "Freedom of Expression: counting the costs", (March 2007)
- 2006 Critical Review of International Social & Political Philosophy 9 (ii) (CRISPP), special issue on "The Political Theory of John Gray"

Articles

- 2011 "Toleration as Sedition", Critical Review of International Social & Political Philosophy 14:3, 363–384
- 2011 "Political Toleration: a reply to Jones", British Journal of Political Science 41: 1, 223–227
- 2011 "Hobbes and Liberal Moralism in International Theory," in Raia Prokhovnik & Gabriela Slomp (eds.), International Political Theory After Hobbes (London: Palgrave)
- 2011 "How Not To Tolerate Religion", in Monica Mookherjee (ed.), Democracy, Religious Pluralism and the Liberal Dilemma of Accommodation (Dordrecht: Springer)
- 2011 "Free Speech and Bad Speech: Nike v. Kasky and the Right to Lie", in Tim Heysse & Barbara Segaert (eds.), Bijdragen: International Journal in Philosophy and Theology 71: 4, 407–425
- 2011 "Liberty v. Liberty; Security v. Security", forthcoming in Charles Husband (ed.), Security and Social Cohesion
- 2011 "The Liberal Theory of Security", forthcoming in Melissa Lane & Glyn Morgan (eds.), Philosophical Perspectives on Security (Cambridge: Cambridge University Press)
- 2011 "Just Politics", forthcoming in Enzo Rossi & Emanuela Ceva (eds.), Beiheft on realism and moralism in political theory, Critical Review of International Social and Political Philosophy
- 2010 "Democracy and Resentment," Redescriptions: Yearbook of Conceptual Thought & Political History, 14, 157–178
- 2010 "Two Dogmas of Liberalism", European Journal of Political Theory 9: 4, 449–65
- 2010 "Not a Woman Hater: Hobbes on Women and the Family," in Yoke-Lian Lee (ed.), The Politics of Gender: a Survey (London: Routledge)
- 2009 "Denial Denied: Freedom of Expression", Amsterdam Law Forum 2: 2, 63–70; online at http://ojs.ubvu.vu.nl/alf/article/view/109
- 2009 "The People vs. the Truth: Democratic Illusions", in Ronald Tinnevelt & Raf Geenens (eds.), Does Truth Matter? Democracy and Public Space (New York: Springer)
- 2008 "Rawlsian Liberalism at the Limits of Intolerance", in S.P.Young (ed.), The Legacy of John Rawls (Aldershot: Ashgate)
- 2008 "The People vs. the Truth: democratic illusions", in K.van Hemelryck (ed.), Truth in Public Space (New York: Springer)
- 2008 "Toleration as Sedition", in M.Matravers & S.Mendus (eds.), Toleration Reconsidered (London: Routledge)
- 2008 "Toleration, Politics, and the Role of Murality", in J.Waldron & M.Williams (eds.), NOMOS XLVIII: Toleration and its Limits (New York: New York University Press), pp360–391
- 2007 Editor’s Introduction, Res Publica 13 (i) (special issue on "Freedom of Expression: counting the costs"), pp1–7
- 2006 "Gray’s Blues: Pessimism as a Political Project" in CRISPP 9 (ii), repr. in The Political Theory of John Gray
- 2006 Editors’ Introduction (co-authored with John Horton) in CRISPP 9 (ii); repr. in The Political Theory of John Gray
- 2004 "Reason, Value, and Pluralism" in Feng Ping (ed.), Axiology in the Twenty-First Century (Guangzhou: Zhangyong University Press)
- 2003 "Value Pluralism in Contemporary Liberalism", in G.Smith (ed.), Liberalism: Critical Assessments (London: Routledge 2003); repr. from Dialogue: the Canadian Philosophical Review 37, pp493–522
- 2003 "Is Democratic Toleration a Rubber Duck?" in D.Castiglione & C.McKinnon (eds.), Toleration, Neutrality and Democracy (Dordrecht: Kluwer); repr. from Castiglione & McKinnon (eds.), Res Publica 7 (iii), pp315–336 (special issue on "Toleration: Moral and Political")
- 2002 "Discourse Rights and the Drumcree Marches: a Reply to O’Neill", British Journal of Politics and International Relations 4 (i), pp75–97
- 2001 "Philosophy, Politics, and Contestability", Journal of Political Ideologies 6 (iii), pp245–261
- 1999 "Tolerance as a Virtue", in S.Mendus & J.Horton (eds.), Toleration: Identity and Difference (London: Macmillan)
- 1998 "Albino Sea-Cucumber", London Review of Books, 5 February 1998, pp6–7. See David Wallace "The Otherness of Castoriadis", Topia: Canadian Journal of Cultural Studies, 3 (Spring 2000), pp 110–115; see p114n3. http://pi.library.yorku.ca/ojs/index.php/topia/article/viewFile/158/148
- 1997 "Metaphysics Postponed: Liberalism, Pluralism and Neutrality", Political Studies 45 (ii), pp296–311
- 1997 "Political Lying: A Defense", Public Affairs Quarterly 11 (ii), pp93–116
- 1997 "Against Thin-Property Reductivism: toleration as supererogatory", Journal of Value Inquiry 31, pp231–249
- 1996 "Reasons Beyond Reason? ‘Political Obligation’ Reconsidered", Philosophical Papers 25 (i), pp21–46
- 1996 "Recent Political Philosophy", Political Studies Association Conference Proceedings (1996), pp1310–1321
- 1996 "Philosophical Aromatherapy", Res Publica, 2 (ii), pp215–221
- 1992 "Fatwa and Fiction: censorship and toleration" in J.Horton & P.Nicholson (eds.), Toleration: Identity and Difference (Aldershot: Avebury); reprinted in J.Horton (ed.), Liberalism, Multiculturalism and Toleration (London: Macmillan 1993)
- 1990 "Reason, Morality and Politics", Morrell Discussion Paper in Political Theory 43 (York: Morrell Studies in Toleration)
- Commentary and review articles for: Times Literary Supplement; London Review of Books; the Independent; Times Higher Education Supplement

Broadcasting

BBC Radio 4 (The World Tonight); BBC Radio 3 (Sunday Feature); Fox Television News, Canadian Broadcasting Corporation (The Current); radio news broadcasts in Austria, Australia, South Africa, Brazil, Ireland, etc.
