= Rita Felski =

American academic

- Born: 1956 (age 69–70)

Academic background
- Education: Monash University, Australia

Academic work
- Institutions: University of Virginia

Rita Felski is an academic and critic who holds the John Stewart Bryan Professorship of English at the University of Virginia and is a former editor of New Literary History. She was also Niels Bohr Professor at the University of Southern Denmark (2016–2021).

Felski is a prominent scholar in the fields of aesthetics and literary theory, feminist theory, modernity and postmodernity, and cultural studies. She is closely associated with the field of postcritique, a school of thought that tries to find new forms of reading and interpretation that go beyond the methods of critique, critical theory, and ideological criticism. Felski is the author of Beyond Feminist Aesthetics: Feminist Literature and Social Change (Harvard UP, 1989), The Gender of Modernity (Harvard UP, 1995), Doing Time: Feminist Theory and Postmodern Culture (New York UP, 2000), Literature After Feminism (Chicago UP, 2003), and Uses of Literature (Blackwell, 2008). The Limits of Critique (Chicago UP, 2015), an assessment of the role of the hermeneutics of suspicion as a mood and method in literary studies, has been widely reviewed. Felski is the editor of Rethinking Tragedy (Johns Hopkins, 2008) and co-editor of Comparison: Theories, Approaches, Uses (Johns Hopkins, 2013), Critique and Postcritique (Duke UP 2017), and Latour and the Humanities (Johns Hopkins, 2020). She has also published articles in numerous essay collections and in such scholarly journals as PMLA, Signs, New Literary History, Modernism/Modernity, Cultural Critique, Theory, Culture and Society, and New Formations. An investigation of aesthetic experience, Hooked: Art and Attachment, was published by the University of Chicago Press in 2020. Her latest book, Selective Affinities, on the relevance of new German critical theory for literary studies and based on her Clark lectures, was published by the University of Chicago Press in 2026.

== Education ==
Felski received an honors degree in French and German literature from Cambridge University and her PhD from the Department of German at Monash University in Australia.

== Career ==
Before coming to the University of Virginia in 1994, she taught in the Program for English and Comparative Literature at Murdoch University in Perth. She served as Chair of the Comparative Literature Program at Virginia from 2004 to 2008.

From 2003 to 2007 Felski served as U.S. editor of Feminist Theory. She has also served on the editorial boards of Modernism/Modernity, Modern Fiction Studies, The International Journal of Cultural Studies, Criticism, and Echo: A Music-Centered Journal. Her work has been translated into Korean, Chinese, Russian, Polish, Swedish, Hungarian, Italian, Croatian, French, German, Spanish, Portuguese, and Turkish.

She has held fellowships at the Society for the Humanities at Cornell University, the Commonwealth Center for Literary and Cultural Change at the University of Virginia, and the Institut für die Wissenschaften vom Menschen (IWM) in Vienna, and was the recipient of an Australian Research Council Major Grant. In 2000, she was awarded the William Parker Riley Prize for the best essay in PMLA. In 2010, she received a Guggenheim Fellowship. In 2016 she was awarded a Niels Bohr Professorship by the Danish National Research Foundation and spent fall semesters at the University of Southern Denmark in the following five years. Rita Felski received an Honorary Doctorate from the University of Southern Denmark in 2016 and will receive an Honorary Doctorate from the University of Turku in 2021. In 2021 she gave the Clark Lectures at Trinity College Cambridge.

== Books and articles ==
- Selective Affinities: Literature and New Critical Theory. University of Chicago Press, 2026
- Love Etc, co-edited with Camilla Schwartz. University of Virginia Press, 2024
- Hooked: Art and Attachment. University of Chicago Press, 2020
- Latour and the Humanities. Johns Hopkins University Press, 2020
- Character: Three Inquiries in Literary Studies (Co-authored alongside Toril Moi and Amanda Anderson). University of Chicago Press, 2019.
- Critique and Postcritique. Duke University Press, 2017
- The Limits of Critique. University of Chicago Press, 2015.
- Comparison: Theories, Approaches, Uses. Johns Hopkins University Press, 2013.
- "After Suspicion," Profession, 2009.
- "Everyday Aesthetics," Minnesota Review 71, 2009.
- Uses of Literature. Blackwell, 2008.
- Rethinking Tragedy, editor. Johns Hopkins University Press, 2008.
- Literature After Feminism. University of Chicago Press, 2003.
- "Modernist Studies and Cultural Studies," Modernism/Modernity, 10:3, 2003.
- Felski, Rita (August 2000). "Being reasonable, telling stories". Feminist Theory. 1 (2): 225–229. doi:10.1177/14647000022229173. S2CID 144580001.
- Doing Time: Feminist Theory and Postmodern Culture. New York University Press, 2000.
- "Nothing to Declare: Identity, Shame and the Lower Middle Class," PMLA 115:1, 2000.
- "The Invention of Everyday Life," New Formations 39, 1999/2000.
- "The Doxa of Difference," Signs 23:1, 1997.
- The Gender of Modernity. Harvard University Press, 1995.
- Beyond Feminist Aesthetics: Feminist Literature and Social Change. Harvard University Press, 1989.
