= Cassandra Laity =

American author and researcher

Cassandra Laity is an author and researcher in the field of modernism. In 2015 she is a visiting scholar at the University of Tennessee-Knoxville.

== Early life and education ==
Laity completed her PhD at the University of Michigan.

== Career ==
In 1985 Laity was an assistant professor of English at Dickinson College in Carlisle, Pennsylvania. She was a professor at Drew University (1992–2013) and has held appointments at the University of Montreal, Vanderbilt University, and the University of Oregon-Eugene.

Laity helped found the Modernist Studies Association and served as an editor of its journal Modernism/modernity for ten years (2000–2010).

Laity writes, lectures and leads discussions on the themes of feminism and decadence in modernist literature and poetry.

Laity has written many articles, which have been published in the journals Modern Drama, Modernism/modernity, ELH, Victorian Poetry and Feminist Studies. She is author or editor of the books H.D.'s Paint it Today (NYU 1992), H.D. and the Victorian Fin-de-Siecle: Gender, Modernism, Decadence (CUP 1996; pbk 2009), and Gender, Desire and Sexuality in T.S. Eliot, with Nancy Gish (CUP 2004; pbk 2007).

In 2015 Laity's research centers around the impact of Darwin's early writings as HMS Beagle's resident geologist and global explorer on the work of the poets Algernon Charles Swinburne, Walter Pater, H.D. and Elizabeth Bishop. She is in the process of writing a book on this topic.

She has been awarded fellowships by the Mellon Foundation, NEH, and the Beinecke Rare Book & Manuscript Library.
