= Assemblage =

Assemblage may refer to:

== Arts and entertainment ==
- Assemblage (album), a compilation album by the British band Japan
- Assemblage (art), an artistic form created on a defined substrate consisting of three-dimensional elements projecting from the substrate
- Assemblage (composition), a literary concept that refers to a text built from existing texts
- Assemblage (philosophy), a concept developed by Gilles Deleuze and Félix Guattari
- Assemblage Entertainment, an Indian animation studio

== Science ==
- Assemblage (archaeology), a set of artefacts or ecofacts found together, from the same place and time
- Faunal assemblage, in archaeology and paleontology, a group of animal fossils found together in a given stratum
- Mineral assemblage, a geological term describing a set of minerals in a rock

== Other uses ==
- Assemblage (journal), a defunct architectural journal
- Assemblage in real estate, see plottage

== See also ==
- A New Philosophy of Society: Assemblage Theory and Social Complexity, a 2006 book by Manuel DeLanda
- Assemblage 23, an American electronic music group
- Assembly (disambiguation)
