= Reassemblage =

Reassemblage may refer to:

- A second or subsequent assemblage
- Reassemblage (film), groundbreaking 1982 documentary film
- Reassemblage (album), 2017 new age album by Visible Cloaks named after the film
