= Stephen K. White =

American political theorist (born 1949)

- Born: 1949 (age 76–77)
- Education: City University of New York
- Scientific career
- Fields: Political theory
- Workplaces: University of Virginia

Stephen K. White (born 1949), is James Hart Professor of Politics at the University of Virginia. His research focuses on critical social and political theory, philosophy of social science, and continental political thought. He has contributed to several scholarly works on Jürgen Habermas, including The Cambridge Companion to Habermas, which he edited. He is also a past editor of the journal Political Theory.

Recently, White's research has focused upon the concept of weak ontology, which he uses to describe a non-foundationalist approach to normative affirmation extrapolated from the works of George Kateb, Charles Taylor, Judith Butler, and William E. Connolly.

== Education ==
White received his Ph.D. from the City University of New York in 1980.

== Selected bibliography ==
=== Books ===
- White, Stephen (1989). The recent work of Jürgen Habermas: reason, justice and modernity. Cambridge England New York: Cambridge University Press. ISBN 9780521389594.
- White, Stephen (1991). Political theory and postmodernism. Cambridge England New York: Cambridge University Press. ISBN 9780521409483.
- White, Stephen (2000). Sustaining affirmation: the strengths of weak ontology in political theory. Princeton: Princeton University Press. ISBN 9780691050331.
- White, Stephen (2002). Edmund Burke: modernity, politics and aesthetics. Lanham, Maryland Oxford: Rowman & Littlefield. ISBN 9780742521353.
- White, Stephen (2009). The ethos of a late-modern citizen. Cambridge, Massachusetts: Harvard University Press. ISBN 9780674032637.
- White, Stephen (2017). A Democratic Bearing: Admirable Citizens, Uneven Injustice, and Critical Theory. Cambridge: Cambridge University Press. ISBN 978-1316616444.
- Scudder, Mary & White, Stephen (2023). The two faces of democracy: Decentering agonism and deliberation. Oxford University Press.

== Edited books ==
- White, Stephen (1989). Life-world and politics: between modernity and postmodernity: essays in honor of Fred R. Dallmayr. Notre Dame, Indianapolis: University of Notre Dame Press. ISBN 9780268012892.
- White, Stephen (1995). The Cambridge companion to Habermas. Cambridge New York: Cambridge University Press. ISBN 9780521446662.
- White, Stephen; Moon, J. Donald (2004). What is political theory. London Thousand Oaks, California: Sage Publications. ISBN 9781412933810.

=== Journal articles ===
- White, Stephen K. (Spring 2000). "Affirmation and weak ontology in political theory: some rules and doubts". Theory & Event. 4 (2).
