= Michael J. Shapiro =

American educator, theorist, and writer (born 1940)

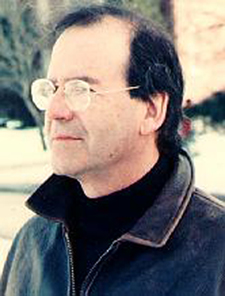
- Michael Shapiro in Hawaii
- Born: February 16, 1940 (age 86)

Philosophical work
- Era: 20th-century philosophy
- Region: Western Philosophy
- School: Political philosophy, Critical theory
- Doctoral students: William A. Callahan
- Main interests: Cultural Studies, film theory, International Relations theory, literary theory, African American Studies, comparative politics, geography, sociology, urban planning, economics, psychoanalysis, indigenous politics

Michael Joseph Shapiro (born February 16, 1940) is an American educator, theorist, and writer. He is a Professor Emeritus of Political Science at the University of Hawaiʻi at Mānoa. His work is often described as "postdisciplinary," drawing from such diverse fields as political philosophy, critical theory, cultural studies, film theory, international relations theory, literary theory, African American studies, comparative politics, geography, sociology, urban planning, economics, psychoanalysis, crime fiction, genre studies, new musicology, aesthetics and indigenous politics.

As the political theorist William E. Connolly has described him: "no one writing in English today has as wide a command over diverse references or develops more profound insights from them".

== Career ==
Shapiro's early work in political science covered the conventional areas of the discipline, including political psychology, decision theory and electoral politics. Around 1980, however, under the influence of philosophers such as Michel Foucault, Shapiro began employing concepts from continental philosophy and cultural studies including governmentality, micropolitics, the movement-image, the time-image, and rhythmanalysis, while introducing unconventional devices such as first-person narrative into his essays. Shapiro's postdisciplinary political thought is the subject of a forthcoming volume from the Routledge book series "Innovators in Political Theory", which will feature a retrospective of his most important essays in a single volume.

Shapiro is the editor of a book series in political theory (with the University of Edinburgh Press) entitled Taking on the Political; previously, he was editor the journal Theory and Event from 2004 to 2009, a book series in international studies and comparative politics (with the University of Minnesota Press) entitled Borderlines. Shapiro received his Ph.D. in political science from Northwestern University in 1966, before moving on to a position as professor and chair of the University of Hawaiiʻi at Mānoa's Political Science Department.

Shapiro has also taught at the University of California, Berkeley (1968–1970), the University of Massachusetts Amherst (1979 and 1986), the University of Bergen in Norway (1972–73), the Tisch School of the Arts at New York University (2002), and the European Graduate School in Saas-Fee, Switzerland. With his colleagues at the University of Hawaiʻi at Mānoa Political Science Department, Shapiro founded what is sometimes called the Aloha School.

== Bibliography ==
- Shapiro, Michael J. (1976). Ethical and political theory. Morristown, New Jersey: General Learning Press. OCLC 2456665.
- — (1981). Language and political understanding: the politics of discursive practices. New Haven: Yale University Press. ISBN 9780300025903.
- —, ed. (1984). Language and politics. New York, New York: New York University Press. ISBN 9780814778395.
- — (1988). The politics of representation: writing practices in biography, photography, and policy analysis. Madison, Wisconsin: University of Wisconsin Press. ISBN 9780299116309.
- Shapiro, Michael J.; Jernudd, Björn H. (1989). The Politics of language purism. Berlin New York: Mouton de Gruyter. ISBN 9780899254838.
- Der Derian, James; Shapiro, Michael J. (1989). International/intertextual relations: postmodern readings of world politics. Lexington, Massachusetts: Lexington Books. ISBN 9780669189551.
- Shapiro, Michael J. (1992). Reading the postmodern polity: political theory as textual practice. Minneapolis, Minnesota: University of Minnesota Press. ISBN 9780816619658.
- Shapiro, Michael J.; Alker, Hayward R. (1996). Challenging boundaries: global flows, territorial identities. Minneapolis, Minnesota: University of Minnesota Press. ISBN 9780816626991.
- Shapiro, Michael J. (1997). Violent cartographies: mapping cultures of war. Minneapolis, Minnesota: University of Minnesota Press. ISBN 9780816629213.
- — (1999). Cinematic political thought: narrating race, nation, and gender. Edinburgh, Scotland New York, New York: Edinburgh University Press New York University Press. ISBN 9780814797518.
- —; Campbell, David (1999). Moral spaces: rethinking ethics and world politics. Minneapolis, Minnesota: University of Minnesota Press. ISBN 9780816632763.
- — (2001). For moral ambiguity: national culture and the politics of the family. Minneapolis, Minnesota: University of Minnesota Press. ISBN 9780816638543.
- — (1993). Reading "Adam Smith" : desire, history, and value. Newbury Park, California: Sage Publications. ISBN 9780803945852.
- — (2002). Reading "Adam Smith": desire, history and value. Lanham, Maryland Oxford: Rowman & Littlefield. ISBN 9780742521339. Original printed in 1993.
- Shapiro, Michael J.; Bennett, Jane, eds. (2002). The politics of moralizing. New York, New York: Routledge. ISBN 9780415934787.
- Shapiro, Michael (2004). Methods and nations: cultural governance and the indigenous subject. New York, New York: Routledge. ISBN 9780415945325.
- Shapiro, Michael J.; Edkins, Jenny; Pin-Fat, Veronique (2004). Sovereign lives: power in global politics. New York, New York: Routledge. ISBN 9780415947367.
- Shapiro, Michael J. (2006). Deforming American political thought: ethnicity, facticity, and genre. Lexington, Kentucky: University Press of Kentucky. ISBN 9780813124124.
- — (2009). Cinematic geopolitics. London New York: Routledge. ISBN 9780203892008.
- — (2010). The time of the city: politics, philosophy and genre. London New York: Routledge. ISBN 9780415780537.
- — (2013). Studies in trans-disciplinary method: after the aesthetic turn. London, New York: Routledge. ISBN 9780203101506.

Aesthetics of Equality (Oxford University Press, 2023)

Writing Politics: Studies in Compositional Method (Routledge, 2021).

The Phenomenology of Religious Belief (Bloomsbury, 2021).

Geopolitics of the Pakistan-Afghanistan Borderland co-edited with Syed Sami Raza (Routledge, 2021).

The Cinematic Political: Film Composition as Political Theory (Routledge, 2020).

Punctuations: How the Arts Think the Political (Duke University Press, 2019).

The Political Sublime Duke University Press (2018).

Deforming American Political Thought [2nd edition with a new chapter and subtitle]: Challenging the Jeffersonian Legacy (Routledge, 2016).

Politics and Time: Documenting the Event (Polity, 2016).

War Crimes: Atrocity, and Justice (Polity, 2015).

Genre and the [Post] Communist Woman co-edited with Florentina Andreescu (Routledge, 2015).

== See also ==
- American philosophy
- List of American philosophers
