= Bruce Holsinger =

American academic and popular author

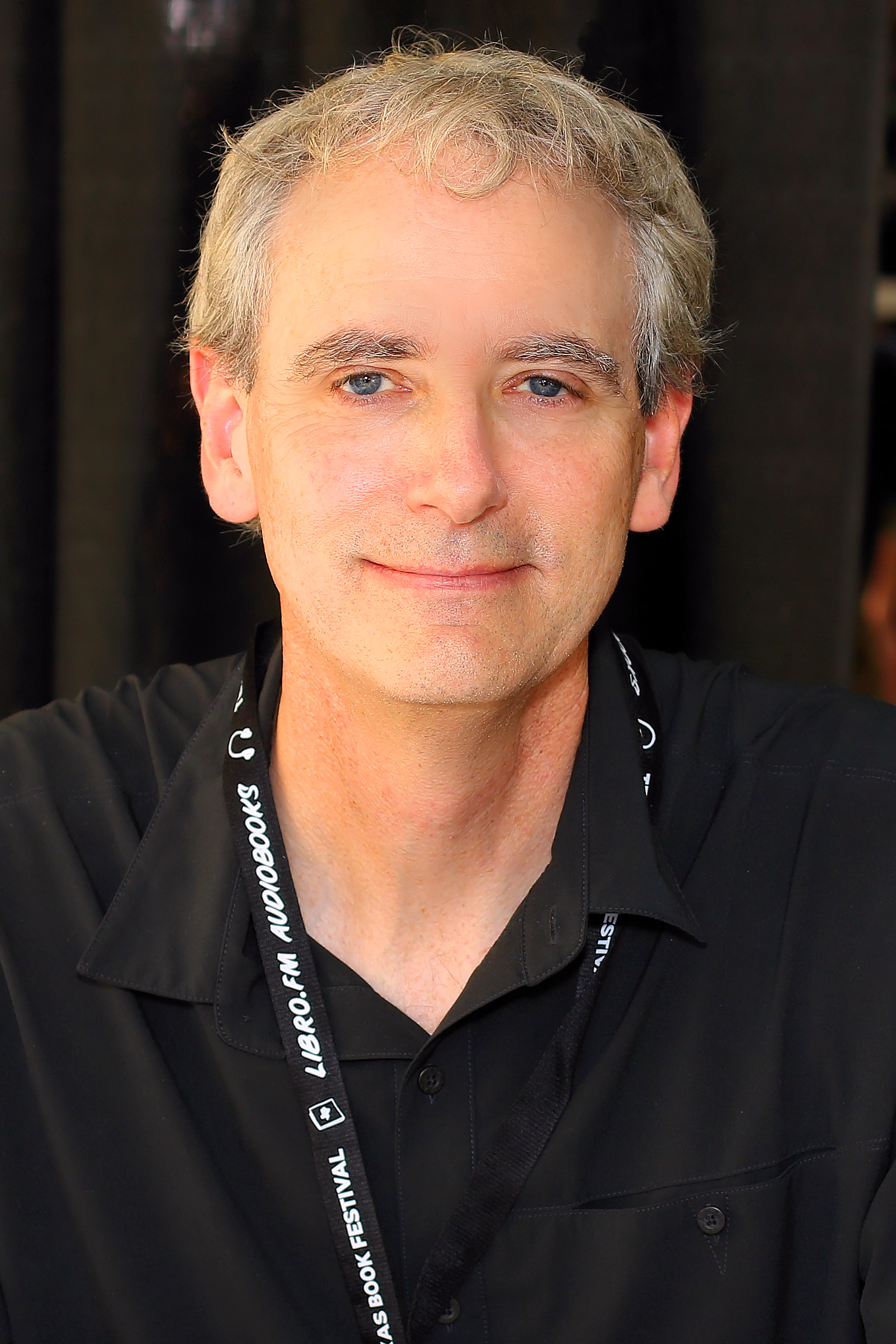
Holsinger at the 2025 Texas Book Festival

Bruce W. Holsinger is an American author, novelist, and an academic and literary scholar. Currently, he is professor of English at the University of Virginia.

== Academic career ==
Bruce Holsinger, a professor at the University of Virginia, started a hashtag called #Thanks for typing, collecting a series of notes by men in academia thanking their wives for typing their manuscripts, but rarely including their names...revealing an archive of unpaid and unrecognised academic labor hidden in the acknowledgments section.

Holsinger is considered an expert on the use of parchment in medieval English manuscript production. He organized, with bioarchaeologists from the University of York, the research project into uterine vellum which established the precise composition for the material used for the creation of the earliest bible manuscripts.

== Novelist ==
The New York Times described him as "gamekeeper turned poacher", due Holsinger, a professor at the University of Virginia specializing in medieval English literature, turning to writing fiction based around his academic interests. His first novel was A Burnable Book in 2014. This was set in fourteenth-century England during the reign of King Richard II, and has Holsinger's protagonist John Gower—at the instigation of Geoffrey Chaucer (Note: It has been surmised that Gower and Chaucer were probably good friends; certainly close enough for Chaucer to grant Gower power of attorney in the 1370s, and to dedicate his Troilus and Criseyde of ten years or so later to him also, where Chaucer refers to "O moral Gower.".)—hunt down a supposedly revolutionary book, in which a series of poems predict the deaths of the kings of England. One of the most prominent characters is one Edgar Rykener—who is in-universe also called Eleanor—a man who dresses as a woman and has sex for money. This inclusion, says Holsinger, is directly based on the real-life case of John Rykener, which also occurred in 1394, the year Holsinger sets the events of his book.

In February 2018 Holsinger was appointed editor of the University of Virginia's peer reviewed journal, New Literary History; he is the third member of staff to take the position since the journal's foundation in 1969. (Note: The previous incumbents were Rita Felski and Ralph Cohen.) He has written for the New York Review of Books, The Washington Post and op-eds for The New York Times.

In July 2025, Holsinger's fifth novel, Culpability, was named Oprah's Book Club pick for the month.

== Books ==
=== Fiction ===
- Culpability (2025)
- The Displacements (2022)
- The Gifted School (2019)
- The Invention of Fire (2015)
- A Burnable Book (2014)

=== Non-Fiction ===
- Holsigner, Bruce W. (2022). On Parchment: Animals, Archives, and the Making of Culture from Herodotus to the Digital Age. New Haven: Yale University Press. OCLC 1374227394.
- Neomedievalism, Neoconservatism, and the War on Terror (Chicago, 2007)
- The Premodern Condition: Medievalism and the Making of Theory (Chicago, 2005)
- Music, Body, and Desire in Medieval Culture (Stanford, 2001)

== Awards and honors ==
- John Hurt Fisher Prize for A Burnable Book
- The Colorado Award for The Gifted School
- Modern Language Association Prize for a First Book for Music, Body, and Desire in Medieval Culture: Hildegard of Bingen to Chaucer
