= War in the Age of Intelligent Machines =

1991 book by Manuel DeLanda

- Author: Manuel DeLanda
- Language: English
- Genre: Non-fiction
- Publisher: Zone Books
- Publication date: 1991
- Publication place: United States
- ISBN: 0-942299-76-0

War in the Age of Intelligent Machines (1991) is a book by Manuel DeLanda, in which he traces the history of warfare and the history of technology.

It is influenced in part by Michel Foucault's Discipline and Punish (1978) and also reinterprets the concepts of war machines and the machinic phylum, introduced in Gilles Deleuze and Félix Guattari's A Thousand Plateaus (1980). Deleuze and Guattari appreciated Foucault's definition of philosophy as a "tool box" that was to encourage thinking about new ideas. They prepared the field for a re-appropriation of their concepts, for use in another context of the "same" concept, which they called "actualization". DeLanda drew on the concepts proposed by these authors to investigate the history of warfare and technology.

== See also ==
- Artificial intelligence
- Revolution in Military Affairs
- History of technology
- History of warfare
- Technological singularity

== Sources ==
- DeLanda, Manuel (1991). War in the Age of Intelligent Machines. New York: Zone Books. Hardcover – ISBN 0-942299-76-0; Paperback – ISBN 0-942299-75-2.
