= Manuel DeLanda =

Mexican-American writer, artist, and philosopher

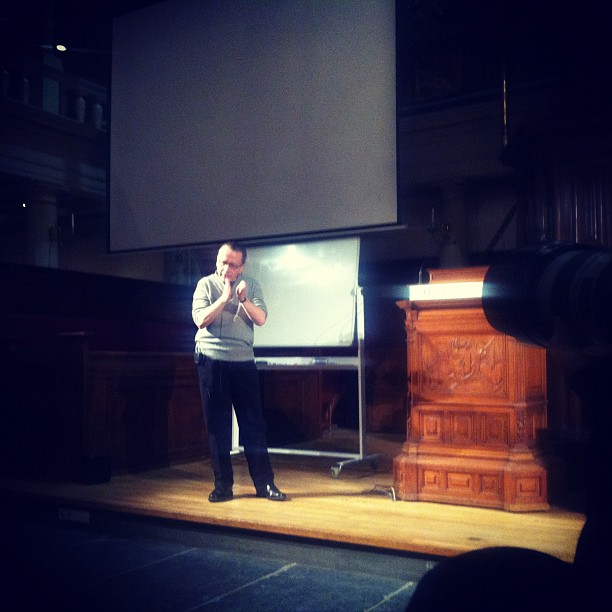
- Manuel DeLanda, 2011
- Born: 1952 (age 73–74); Mexico City, Mexico

Education
- Education: School of Visual Arts (BFA); European Graduate School (PhD)

Philosophical work
- Era: Contemporary philosophy
- Region: Western philosophy
- School: Continental philosophy Speculative realism New materialism
- Institutions: European Graduate School; Princeton University; Pratt Institute; University of Pennsylvania; Columbia University
- Main interests: Philosophy of science
- Notable ideas: Assemblage theory

Manuel DeLanda (born 1952) is a Mexican-American writer, artist and philosopher who has lived in New York City since 1975. He is a lecturer in architecture at the Princeton University School of Architecture and the University of Pennsylvania School of Design, where he teaches courses on the philosophy of urban history and the dynamics of cities as historical actors with an emphasis on the importance of self-organization and material culture in the understanding of a city. DeLanda also teaches architectural theory as an adjunct professor of architecture and urban design at the Pratt Institute and serves as the Gilles Deleuze Chair and Professor of Philosophy at the European Graduate School. He holds a BFA from the School of Visual Arts (1979) and a PhD in media and communication from the European Graduate School (2010).

DeLanda was previously a visiting professor at the University of Southern California School of Architecture, where he taught an intensive two-week course in the spring 2012 term on self-organization and urbanity; adjunct associate professor at the Columbia University Graduate School of Architecture, Planning and Preservation from 1995 to 2006; and adjunct professor at Cooper Union's Irwin S. Chanin School of Architecture.

== Films ==
After moving to New York, DeLanda created several experimental films between 1975 and 1982, some as part of an undergraduate coursework at the School of Visual Arts. While at SVA, DeLanda studied under video artist Joan Braderman; they were subsequently married in 1980 and collaborated on several works (including Braderman's Joan Does Dynasty [1986], DeLanda's Raw Nerves [1980] and Ismism [1979]) before divorcing at an indeterminate point.

Influenced by the no wave cinema movement, DeLanda's Super 8 and 16mm films also served as methodical, theory-based approaches to the form. He pulled them from circulation after the original negatives were lost; in 2011, Anthology Film Archives restored and reissued them.

Cited by filmmaker Nick Zedd in his Cinema of Transgression Manifesto, DeLanda associated with many of the No Wave experimental filmmakers of this New York based-movement. In 2010, he appeared in Céline Danhier's retrospective documentary Blank City. Much of his oeuvre was inspired by his nascent interest in continental philosophy and critical theory; one of his best known films is Raw Nerves: A Lacanian Thriller (1980).

Having moved on to the nondeterministic synthesis of Baudrillardian and Deleuzian theory, command and control techniques, and materialistic concerns of complex systems and artificial life (including cellular automata) that would comprise "Policing the Spectrum" (1986) and War in the Age of Intelligent Machines (1992), DeLanda had largely eschewed by the mid-1980s his interests in "post-Freudian ideas of the unconscious... as well as any interest in film theory."

== Philosophical work ==
DeLanda's notable works include War in the Age of Intelligent Machines (1991), A Thousand Years of Nonlinear History (1997), Intensive Science and Virtual Philosophy (2002) and A New Philosophy of Society: Assemblage Theory and Social Complexity (2006). He has published many articles and essays and lectured extensively in Europe and in the United States. His work focuses on the theories of the French philosophers Gilles Deleuze and Félix Guattari on one hand, and modern science, self-organizing matter, artificial life and intelligence, economics, architecture, chaos theory, history of science, nonlinear dynamics, cellular automata on the other. His 2015 book Philosophical Chemistry: Genealogy of a Scientific Field furthers his intervention in the philosophy of science and science studies.

== Books ==
- War in the Age of Intelligent Machines. Zone Books. 1991. ISBN 9780942299755.
- A Thousand Years of Nonlinear History. Zone Books. 1997. ISBN 9780942299328.
- Intensive Science and Virtual Philosophy. Bloomsbury Academic. 2002. ISBN 9781780937991.
- A New Philosophy of Society: Assemblage Theory And Social Complexity. Bloomsbury Academic. 2006. ISBN 9780826491695.
- Deleuze: History and Science. Atropos Press. 2010. ISBN 9780982706718.
- Philosophy & Simulation: The Emergence of Synthetic Reason. Bloomsbury Academic. 2011. ISBN 9781474252843. Archived from the original on December 2, 2015.
- Philosophical Chemistry: Genealogy of a Scientific Field. Bloomsbury Academic. 2015. ISBN 9781472591838.
- Assemblage Theory. Edinburgh University Press. 2016. ISBN 9781474413633.
- The Rise of Realism. Wiley. 2017. ISBN 9781509519026.
- Materialist Phenomenology: A Philosophy of Perception (Theory in the New Humanities). Bloomsbury Academic. 2021. ISBN 9781350263956.

== See also ==
- New materialism
- Noosphere
- Metaphysical realism
- Wargaming
- Cinema of Transgression
