= New materialism =

Movement within contemporary philosophy

New materialism is a movement within contemporary philosophy that seeks to rework the conventional ontological understanding of the material world. While many philosophical tendencies are associated with new materialism, in such a way that the movement resists a single definition, its common characteristics include a rejection of essentialism, representationalism, and anthropocentrism as well as the dualistic boundaries between nature/culture; subject/object; and human/non-human. Instead, new materialists emphasize how fixed entities and apparently closed systems are produced through dynamic relations and processes, considering the distribution of agency through the interaction of heterogeneous forces. The movement has influenced a wide variety of new articulations between intellectual currents in science and philosophy, in fields such as science and technology studies, as well as systems science.

== Origin ==
The term was independently coined by Manuel DeLanda and Rosi Braidotti during the second half of the 1990s to identify an emerging body of interdisciplinary theory that sought to overcome the post-structuralist emphasis on discourse, while drawing on the work of Gilles Deleuze, Félix Guattari, and Gilbert Simondon in seeking to establish a materialist ontology that prioritizes processes of individuation.

== Reception ==
New materialism has been well-received by some individuals in a wide range of disciplines in contemporary academia, from environmental studies to philosophy. Frequently referenced works include Karen Barad's Meeting the Universe Halfway and Jane Bennett's Vibrant Matter. New Materialists emphasise how Cartesian binaries around human and nature have caused many issues in the world by ignoring social complexity. New materialism has been championed for its more integrated approach that considers material and immaterial, biological, and social aspects as interconnected processes rather than distinct entities.

== Criticism ==
Ecologist Andreas Malm has called new materialism "idealism of the most useless sort", stating that the approach has little use for climate action or changing our relationship with nature, since it denies distinctions between humanity and nature. Malm argues that this supports the status quo rather than challenging it. He also expresses frustration with the writing style of many new materialists, claiming that they resist distinctions between things, making their writing impenetrable.

== Associated theorists ==
- Karen Barad
- Jane Bennett
- Rosi Braidotti
- Donna Haraway
- Isabelle Stengers
- Rick Dolphijn
- Manuel DeLanda
- Catherine Malabou
- Quentin Meillassoux
- Bruno Latour
- Arturo Escobar
- Levi Bryant
- Drew M. Dalton
- Thomas Nail
- Tim Ingold

== See also ==
- Posthumanism
- Assemblage (philosophy)
- Agential realism
- Dispositif
- Speculative realism#Transcendental materialism
