= William A. Callahan =

Academic background
- Education: McGill University; University of Hawaii
- Thesis: Another Book of Laughter and Misunderstandings: A Field Guide to Chuckles, Smiles and Guffaws (1992)
- Doctoral advisor: Michael J. Shapiro
- Website: sensiblepolitics.net

William A. Callahan is a political scientist whose main research interests include China's global politics, visual international politics, documentary filmmaking, and international relations theory. Since 2024, he is professor of political science at Singapore Management University. Before that Callahan was Professor of International relations at the London School of Economics and Political Science (LSE). Callahan was Chair Professor of International Politics and China studies at the University of Manchester (2005–2013), and co-director of the British Inter-University China Centre, University of Oxford. Callahan serves on the editorial board of Journal of Contemporary China. In the early 1990s, Callahan lived in Bangkok, Thailand where he worked at The Nation newspaper writing editorial essays, and at Rangsit University as the Director of the Philosophy, Politics and Economics Programme.

In addition to writing books and articles, Callahan—under the name "Bill Callahan"--makes documentary films, including "toilet adventures" (2015), "Mearsheimer vs. Nye on the Rise of China" (2015), "Great Walls" (2020), and "The Nose Knows: Foreignness and Fortune in China" (2024) that explores how Chinese understand identity, difference, and foreign affairs.

Callahan's articles and videos are available at his website, sensiblepolitics.net.

== Career ==
Callahan has been a member of:

- American Political Science Association, 1990–present
- Association for Asian Studies, 1990–present
- British International Studies Association, 1996–present
- International Studies Association, 1997–present

== Publications ==
=== Monographs ===
- Pollwatching, Elections and Civil Society in Southeast Asia (1997, 2019)
- Imagining Democracy: Reading "the Events of May" in Thailand (1998)
- Contingent States: Greater China and Transnational Relations (2004)
- Cultural Governance and Resistance in Pacific Asia (2006)
- China: The Pessoptimist Nation (2009)
- China Dreams: 20 Views of the Future (2013)
- Sensible Politics: Visualizing International Relations (2020)

=== Edited books ===
- China Orders the World: Normative Soft Power and Foreign Policy, co-edited with Elena Barabantseva (2011)
