= Michele Moody-Adams =

American philosopher

- Born: 1956 (age 69–70)

Academic background
- Education: Wellesley College (B.A.); Somerville College, Oxford (B.A.); Harvard University (Ph.D.)
- Doctoral advisor: John Rawls

Academic work
- Discipline: Philosophy
- Sub-discipline: Moral philosophy, political philosophy, philosophy of law
- Institutions: Columbia University; Cornell University; Indiana University

Michele Moody-Adams (born 1956) is an American philosopher and academic administrator. Between July 1, 2009, and September 2011, she served as Dean of Columbia College and Vice President for Undergraduate Education at Columbia University. She was the first woman and first African-American to hold the post. She has since resigned as dean, citing the decreasing autonomy of Columbia College. She remains a faculty member in the department of philosophy. In 2021, she was elected to the American Academy of Arts and Sciences.

== Early life and education ==
Moody-Adams grew up in Chicago on the Southside. Moody-Adams' father was a schoolteacher. Moody-Adams was close with her father, and they would listen to opera and classical music together on the weekends. She attended Wellesley College and, having studied with Ruth Anna Putnam, she graduated from there in 1978 with a B.A. in philosophy. She attended Somerville College at Oxford University on a Marshall Scholarship, and received a B.A. in philosophy, politics, and economics, in 1980. She earned her Ph.D. in philosophy from Harvard University in 1986. Moody-Adams wrote her dissertation on "Moral Philosophy Naturalized: Morality and Mitigated Skepticism in Hume" under the supervision of John Rawls.

== Career ==
Before joining the faculty at Cornell University in the fall of 2000, Moody-Adams worked at Indiana University, Bloomington, where she was a professor of philosophy, as well as associate dean for undergraduate education. At Cornell, she was vice provost for undergraduate education and Hutchinson Professor of Ethics and Public Life. In February 2009, Moody-Adams co-sponsored with university funds a controversial student display on the Cornell campus by the Islamic Alliance for Justice consisting of signs and 1300 flags representing dead Palestinians and Israelis. Moody-Adams responded to the September 11 attacks by asserting that "Vengeance is not the answer here," and that the result of an American military response could be the end of everything worth fighting for, "even the end of the species."

When she was appointed to her Columbia post, administrators at Cornell praised her; "Michele is an exceptional scholar and administrator," said Provost Kent Fuchs. "Her breadth of experience working on many issues of vital importance to the university and her deep academic insights have enriched Cornell in multiple ways. We will miss her leadership, insights and intellect." She was the first female and first Black dean at Columbia.

On August 20, 2011, Moody-Adams announced her resignation from the deanship, effective the following June 30, after only two years on the job, citing changes in Columbia University policy toward Columbia College that made it impossible for her to remain in her post. In addition, Moody-Adams stepped down because of concern that changes being made would greatly affect both the finances of the college and the academic quality. She also holds a tenured position at Columbia, Moody-Adams is currently a Joseph Straus Professor of Political Philosophy and Legal Theory in their philosophy department.

== Personal life ==
She is married to James Eli Adams, a specialist in Victorian literature, who is a professor of English and comparative literature at Columbia University. Their daughter's name is Katherine; she was born in 1996.

== Author ==
Moody-Adams has published more than two dozen reviews and articles, and two books. Her first book, Fieldwork in Familiar Places: Morality, Culture, and Philosophy, was written in 1997 and published by Harvard University Press. It challenges morality, culture, and objectivity. She explains that we can agree to moral disagreement while still upholding our beliefs of moral objectivity. Moody-Adams dissects evidence that anthropologists use for moral relativism. She details what "culture" is under moral relativism. Moody-Adams argues that ethics are interpretive. Her belief is that we must rely on ourselves as moral inquirers in our own complex communities. Her second book, Making Space for Justice: Social Movements, Collective Imagination, and Political Hope, published by Columbia University Press in 2022, raises philosophical questions about social justice movements and how justice can be met. Moody-Adams questions what can be learned from these movements and how we can create space for justice worldwide. She uses examples of movements, agents of change, and philosophical principles to raise questions. Political hope is upheld through social policy and motivation to pursue justice at all levels. Moody-Adams uses the book to close the gap between theory and practice.

== Bibliography ==
- Making Space for Justice: Social Movements, Collective Imagination, and Political Hope (Cambridge: Columbia University Press, 2022).
- Fieldwork in Familiar Places: Morality, Culture and Philosophy (Cambridge: Harvard University Press, 1997).
- "The Idea of Moral Progress," Metaphilosophy (1999).
- "Grrffin's Modest Proposal," Utilitas (1999).
- "A Commentary on Color Conscious: The Political Morality of Race," Ethics (1999).
- "The Virtues of Nussbaum's Essentialism," Metaphilosophy (1998).
- "Culture, Responsibility, and Affected Ignorance," Ethics (1994).
- "Theory, Practice and the Contingency of Rorty's Irony," Journal of Social Philosophy (1994).
- "Race, Class and the Social Construction of Self-Respect," Philosophical Forum (1992-3).
- "On the Old Saw that Character is Destiny," in Identity, Character, and Morality: Essays in Moral Psychology, ed. O. Flanagan and A. Rorty (Cambridge, Ma.: MIT Press, 1991).
- "Gender and the Complexity of Moral Voices," in Feminist Ethics, ed. Claudia Card (Lawrence: University Press of Kansas, 1991).
- "On Surrogacy: Morality, Markets and Motherhood," Public Affairs Quarterly (1991).
- "On the Alleged Methodological Infirmity of Ethics," American Philosophical Quarterly (1990).

Academic offices
Preceded by Austin E. Quigley	Dean of Columbia College; 2009–2011	Succeeded by James J. Valentini
