= Rosi Braidotti =

Philosopher

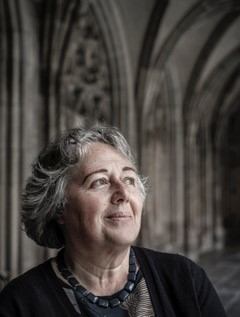
- Rosi Braidotti inside the Domtuin at Utrecht University
- Born: 28 September 1954 (age 72); Latisana, Italy
- Spouse: Anneke Smelik

Education
- Education: Australian National University (BAs); Panthéon-Sorbonne University (PhD)

Philosophical work
- Era: Contemporary philosophy
- Region: Western philosophy
- School: Continental philosophy; New materialism; Postmodern feminism; Posthumanism
- Institutions: Utrecht University
- Main interests: Political philosophy

Rosi Braidotti (/braɪˈdɒti/; Italian: [braiˈdɔtːi]; born 28 September 1954) is a contemporary philosopher and feminist theoretician.

Born in Italy, she studied in Australia and France and works in the Netherlands. Braidotti is currently Distinguished University Professor Emerita at Utrecht University, where she has taught since 1988, and Honorary Professor at RMIT University in Australia. She was a professor and the founding director of Utrecht University's women's studies programme (1988–2005) and the founding director of the Centre for the Humanities (2007–2016). She has been awarded honorary degrees from Helsinki (2007) and Linkoping (2013); she is a Fellow of the Australian Academy of the Humanities (FAHA) since 2009, and a Member of the Academia Europaea (MAE) since 2014. Her main publications include Nomadic Subjects (2011) and Nomadic Theory (2011), both with Columbia University Press, The Posthuman (2013), Posthuman Knowledge (2019), and Posthuman Feminism (2022) with Polity Press. In 2016, she co-edited Conflicting Humanities with Paul Gilroy, and The Posthuman Glossary in 2018 with Maria Hlavajova, both with Bloomsbury Academic.

== Biography ==
=== Early life and education ===
Braidotti, who holds Italian and Australian citizenship, was born in Italy and moved to Australia when she was 16. She received two BAs from the Australian National University in Canberra: one in English literature (in 1976), and one in philosophy (in 1977). Her thesis director was Genevieve Lloyd. She was awarded the University Medal in Philosophy and the University Tillyard prize. Braidotti then moved on to do her doctoral work at Panthéon-Sorbonne University, where she received her PhD in philosophy, cum laude, in 1981. Her dissertation was titled Feminism and Philosophy: Foucault's critique of power, in relation to feminist theory. Her supervisor was Hélène Védrine

=== Career ===
Braidotti has taught at the University of Utrecht in the Netherlands since 1988, when she was appointed as the founding professor in women's studies. In 1995 she became the founding Director of the Netherlands research school of Women's Studies, a position she held till 2005.

Braidotti is a pioneer in European Women's Studies: she founded the inter-university SOCRATES network NOISE and the Thematic Network for Women's Studies ATHENA, which she directed till 2005. She was a Leverhulme Trust Visiting professor at Birkbeck College in 2005–6; a Jean Monnet professor at the European University Institute in Florence in 2002–2003 and a fellow in the school of Social Science at the Institute for Advanced Study in Princeton in 1994. She is a founding member of the European Consortium for Humanities Institutes and Centres (ECHIC), 2008; in 2010 she was elected member of the Board of the Consortium Humanities Centres and Institutes (CHCI) and in 2014 a member of the Scientific Council of the Conseil National de la Recherche Scientifique in France. Braidotti was the founding Director of the Centre for the Humanities at Utrecht University (2007–2016), and is currently Distinguished University Professor at Utrecht University.

Braidotti serves, or has served, on the advisory board of many academic feminist journals, including differences, Signs, Women's Studies International Forum, and Feminist Formations.

=== Core publications ===
Braidotti's publications have consistently been placed in continental philosophy, at the intersection with social and political theory, cultural politics, gender, feminist theory and ethnicity studies. The core of her interdisciplinary work consists of four interconnected monographs on the constitution of contemporary subjectivity, with special emphasis on the concept of difference within the history of European philosophy and political theory.

This is evidenced in the philosophical agenda set in her first book Patterns of Dissonance: An Essay on Women in Contemporary French Philosophy, 1991, which gets developed further in the trilogy that follows. In the next book, Nomadic Subjects: Embodiment and Difference in Contemporary Feminist Theory, 1994, the question is formulated in more concrete terms: can gender, ethnic, cultural or European differences be understood outside the straitjacket of hierarchy and binary opposition? Thus the following volume, Metamorphoses: Towards a Materialist Theory of Becoming, 2002, analyses not only gender differences, but also more categorical binary distinctions between self and other, European and foreign, human and non-human (animal-, environmental-, technological-others).

The conclusion is that a systematic ambivalence structures contemporary cultural representations of the globalised, technologically mediated, ethnically mixed, gender-aware world. The question consequently arises of what it takes to produce adequate cultural and political representations of a fast-changing world and move closer to Spinozian notions of adequate understanding.

The ethical dimension of Braidotti's work on difference comes to the fore in the last volume of the trilogy, Transpositions: On Nomadic Ethics, 2006. Here she surveys the different ethical approaches that can be produced by taking difference and diversity as the main point of reference and concludes that there is much to be gained by suspending belief that political participation, moral empathy and social cohesion can only be produced on the basis of the notion of recognition of sameness.

Braidotti makes a case for an alternative view on subjectivity, ethics and emancipation and pitches diversity against the postmodernist risk of cultural relativism while also standing against the tenets of liberal individualism. Throughout her work, Braidotti asserts and demonstrates the importance of combining theoretical concerns with a serious commitment to producing socially and politically relevant scholarship that contributes to making a difference in the world. Braidotti's output also included several edited volumes. Her work has been translated in a total of 19 languages and all the main books in at least three languages other than English.

=== Latest publications ===
In 2022, Braidotti published Posthuman Feminism, a text that helps establish a theoretical foundation for posthuman feminism, an alternate strand of posthumanism that seeks to move beyond Enlightenment humanism, embrace the nonhuman, and imagine how technology is changing human life while still centering social justice issues of gender, race, and class.

In The Posthuman (2013), Braidotti offers both an introduction and a major contribution to contemporary debates on the posthuman. As the traditional distinction between the human and its others has blurred, exposing the non-naturalistic structure of the human, The Posthuman starts by exploring the extent to which a post-humanist move displaces the traditional humanistic unity of the subject. Rather than perceiving this situation as a loss of cognitive and moral self-mastery, Braidotti argues that the posthuman helps to make sense of flexible and multiple identities.

Braidotti then analyzes the escalating effects of post-anthropocentric thought, which encompass not only other species but also the sustainability of the planet as a whole. Because contemporary market economies profit from the control and commodification of all that lives, they result in hybridization, erasing categorical distinctions between the human and other species, seeds, plants, animals and bacteria. These dislocations induced by globalized cultures and economies enable a critique of anthropocentrism, but how reliable are they as indicators of a sustainable future?

The Posthuman concludes by considering the implications of these shifts for the institutional practice of the humanities. Braidotti outlines new forms of cosmopolitan neo-humanism that emerge from the spectrum of post-colonial and race studies, as well as gender analysis and environmentalism. The challenge of the posthuman condition consists in seizing the opportunities for new social bonding and community building, while pursuing sustainability and empowerment.

In 2011 Braidotti published two new books: the renewed and revised edition of Nomadic Subjects and a collection of essays Nomadic Theory. The Portable Rosi Braidotti. The collection provides a core introduction to Braidotti's nomadic theory and its innovative formulations, which engage with Gilles Deleuze, Michel Foucault, Luce Irigaray, and a host of political and cultural issues. Arranged thematically, essays begin with such concepts as sexual difference and embodied subjectivity and follow with explorations in technoscience, feminism, postsecular citizenship, and the politics of affirmation.

Influenced by philosophers such as Gilles Deleuze and especially French feminist thinker Luce Irigaray, Braidotti has brought postmodern feminism into the Information Age with her considerations of cyberspace, prosthesis, and the materiality of difference. Braidotti also considers how ideas of gender difference can affect the experience of the human/animal and human/machine divides. Braidotti has also pioneered European perspectives in feminist philosophy and practice and has been influential on third-wave as well as post-secular feminisms.

=== Honours ===
On 3 March 2005, Braidotti was honored with a Royal Knighthood from Queen Beatrix of the Netherlands; in August 2006 she received the University Medal from the University of Łódź in Poland and she was awarded an Honorary Degree in Philosophy from Helsinki University in May 2007. In 2009, she was elected Honorary Fellow of the Australian Academy of the Humanities. Since 2009, she has been a board member of Consortium of Humanities Centre and Institutes. In 2013 she received an Honorary Degree in Philosophy from Linköping University in Sweden. Braidotti was elected a member of Academia Europaea in 2014. In 2022, Rosi Braidotti was granted the Humboldt Research Award (von Humboldt Forschungspreis) for Lifelong Achievements in research and teaching. The Alexander von Humboldt Foundation and the University of Göttingen, Germany. She was sponsored by Prof. Hiltraud Casper-Hehne.

=== International activities (2011–present) ===
- 2020: Visiting Research Fellowship at the Department of Media and Communication, Royal Melbourne Institute of Technology (RMIT).
- 2019–2022: Honorary Visiting Professorship at the Institute for Global Prosperity, University College London, UK.
- 2019–2021: Research Network Grant from the Volkswagen Foundation "Establishing a Regional Team Europe in the Framework of the World Humanities Report", supported by UNESCO and CIPSH (Conseil International Philosophie et Sciences Humaines). With the Universities of Göttingen, Bologna, University College London and Belgrade.
- 2019: The Diane Middlebrook and Carl Djerassi Visiting Professorship at the University of Cambridge Centre for Gender Studies; Visiting Scholar at St John's College, Cambridge
- 2017: Delivered the Tanner Lectures on Human Values at the Whitney Humanities Center, Yale University (1–3 March 2017).
- 2015–2017: Appointed member of the core group of the steering committee for the First World Humanities Conference, organized by CIPSH (Conseil International de la Philosophie et des Sciences Humaines), UNESCO and the University of Liège (Belgium), 6–12 August 2017. Presidents of the Conference: Prof. Chao Gejin (Beijing) and Prof. Robert Halleux (University of Liège).
- 2014: Elected member of the Scientific Council of the Conseil National de la Recherche Scientifique in France.
- 2012: Mellon Foundation Grant for an international collaborative project on: 'Religion and Political Belonging', with the University of Portland, Oregon; the University of Arizona, of Tel Aviv, The Chinese University of Hong Kong and Duke University in the USA.
- 2011 – present: Founding member of the European Consortium for Humanities Institutes and Centres ECHIC.

=== Key note addresses ===
- "On Affirmation", at the Critical Thinking Program of the Tenerife Espacio de las Artes Museum (TEA); the Island Council of Tenerife (Canary Islands, Spain) and the Department of Sociology at the University of La Laguna, September 16, 2023.
- "Posthuman Biopolitics", at the Annual Conference, American Association for Italian Studies, at Texas Christian University, Fort Worth Texas (online only), May 18–20, 2023.
- "Posthumanism and Education: Critical Perspectives", Conference keynote Lecture, The Philosophy of Education Society of Australasia PESA Committee, (online only), Sidney, December 10, 2022.
- "On Posthuman Feminism", at "Meeting on Arts", at the 59th Venice Art Biennale The Milk of Dreams. Venice, Italy. June 7, 2022.
- "Affirmative Ethics and Ways of Dying", at the (Im)materialities of Violence online Conference, Department of Modern Languages, the University of Birmingham, UK, November 25, 2021 (online only).
- Posthuman Feminism’. “Future of Feminism Workshop”. The British Society for Phenomenology and the University of Tilburg (online only). November 24, 2021.
- "Corpi postumani". Conference: Sguardi sulle Differenze: Memorie, Bussole, Cambiamenti. Laboratorio di Studi Femministi, Università La sapienza, Rome, Italy. November 12, 2021 (online only).
- 'Posthuman Feminism: Sexuality Beyond Gender', at the Second Latinamerican Dialogue Polimorphisms II: The Posthuman. Organized by the International Psychoanalytic Association Committee "Sexuality and Gender diversity" and the "Interdisciplinary Studies on Subjectivity Program", University of Buenos Aires, Argentina (online only), June 4, 2021.
- "The New Humanities", at the Arab Regional Forum on the Humanities, Recentering the Humanities. Organized by UNESCO and CIPSH, Beirut (online only), April 6–7, 2021.
- "La condizione postumana", GEMMA Gender Studies Programme, University of Bologna, Italy, June 15, 2020 (online only).
- "Gender, Research, Europe: New Perspectives for Collaborative Work", at the closing conference of the H2020 Project PLOTINA: Promoting Gender Balance and Inclusion in Research, Innovation and Training, University of Bologna, January 27, 2020 (in person).
- "Posthuman Subjectivity", at the After Agency Conference, Adam Mickiewicz University, Poznan, Poland, November 13, 2019 (video link).
- "The Critical Posthumanities", at the Fourth Symposium of Social and Cultural Studies at SoCuM: [Posthuman? New Perspectives on Nature/Culture] Jenseits des Menschen? Posthumane Perspektiven auf Natur/Kultur, Johannes Gutenberg University Mainz, Germany, September 19, 2019.
- "Affirmation and Critical Posthuman Theory", at the 25th International Conference of the Friedrich Nietzsche Society: Nietzsche and Humanity: (Anti-)Humanism, Posthumanism, Transhumanism, Tilburg University, the Netherlands, September 14, 2019.
- "What Is the Human in the Humanities Today?", at the conference Posthumanities in Asia: Theories and Practices, Kansei University, Osaka, Japan, 8 June 2019.

== Bibliography ==
=== Books ===
- 1991, Patterns of Dissonance: An Essay on Women in Contemporary French Philosophy, Cambridge: Polity Press; USA: Routledge, pp. 316. Second edition: 1996.
- 1994, Co-authored with Ewa Charkiewicz, Sabine Hausler and Saskia Wieringa: Women, the Environment and Sustainable Development. Towards a Theoretical Synthesis, London: Zed Books, pp. 220.
- 1994, Nomadic Subjects. Embodiment and Sexual difference in Contemporary Feminist Theory. Cambridge: Columbia University Press, pp. 326.
- 1996, Madri, mostri e macchine, Rome: Manifesto Libri, With postface by Anna Maria Crispino. Second edition, revised and enlarged, 2005.
- 2002, Nuovi soggetti nomadi, Rome: Luca Sossella editore, pp. 201.
- 2002, Metamorphoses: Towards a Materialist Theory of Becoming, Cambridge: Polity Press, pp. 317.
- 2003, Baby Boomers: Vite parallele dagli anni Cinquanta ai cinquant'anni, Florence: Giunti, pp. 191.
- 2004, Feminismo, diferencia sexual y subjetividad nómada, Barcelona: Gedisa, pp. 234.
- 2004, Op doorreis: nomadisch denken in de 21ste eeuw, Amsterdam: Boom, pp. 298.
- 2006, Transpositions: On Nomadic Ethics, Cambridge: Polity Press pp. 304.
- 2007, Egy nomád térképei. Feminizmus a posztmodern után, Budapest: Balassi Kiado, pp. 137.
- 2009, La philosophie, là où on ne l'attend pas, Paris: Larousse, pp. 286.
- 2011a, Nomadic Subjects. Embodiment and Sexual Difference in Contemporary Feminist Theory, Second Edition, New York: Columbia University Press, pp. 334.
- 2011b, Nomadic Theory. The Portable Rosi Braidotti, New York: Columbia University Press, pp. 416.
- 2013, The Posthuman, Cambridge: Polity Press
- 2017a, Les posthumanitats a debat, Barcelona: CCCB, col·lecció Breus
- 2017b, Per una politica affermativa. Milan: Mimesis Edizioni—I Volti.
- 2017, Posthuman Knowledge. Cambridge: Polity Press.
- 2022, Posthuman Feminism. Cambridge: Polity Press.
- 2024, Il ricordo di un sogno. Una storia di radici e confini. Milan: Rizzoli Libri. ISBN 9788817190145

=== Edited volumes ===
- Guest editor Braidotti, Rosi (1987). "Des organes sans corps". Les Cahiers du GRIF. 36 (1): 7–22. doi:10.3406/grif.1987.1735.
- Guest editor Braidotti, Rosi (July 1993). "Women's studies at the university of Utrecht". Women's Studies International Forum. 16 (4): 311–324. doi:10.1016/0277-5395(93)90020-a.
- Een beeld van een vrouw. De visualisering van het vrouwelijke in een postmoderne cultuur, Kampen: Kok Agora, 1993, pp. 188.
- Poste restante. Feministische berichten aan het postmoderne. Kampen: Kok Agora, 1994, pp. 157.
- (Ed. with Suzette Haaksma), Ik denk dus zij is; De vrouwelijke intellectueel in literair en historisch perspectief, Kampen: Kok Agora, 1994, pp. 199.
- (Ed. with Nina Lykke) Between Monsters, Goddesses and Cyborgs. Feminist Confrontations With Science, Medicine and Cyberspace. London: Zed Books, 1996, pp. 260.
- (Ed. with Gloria Wekker) Praten in het donker. Multiculturalisme en anti-racisme in feministisch perspectief. Kampen: Kok Agora, 1996, pp. 170.
- (Ed. with Gabriele Griffin) Thinking Differently: a Reader in European Women's Studies, London / New York: Zed Books, 2002, pp. 405.
- (Ed. with Charles Esche and Maria Hlavajova) Citizens and Subjects: The Netherlands, for example, Critical Reader/Catalogue for the Dutch Pavilion at the Biennale in Venice, 2007 Utrecht: BAK and Zurich: JRP, pp. 334.
- (Ed. with Claire Colebrook and Patrick Hanafin) Deleuze and Law. Forensic Futures. London: Palgrave Macmillan, 2009, pp. 212.
- (Ed. with Claire Colebrook) special edition of Australian Feminist Studies, on: "Feminist Timelines', Routledge Volume 24 Issue 59, 2009, pp. 142.
- The History of Continental Philosophy, Volume 7, Durham: Acumen, 2010, pp. 398.
- (Ed. with Patrick Hanafin and Bolette Blaagaard) After Cosmopolitanism, New York: Routledge, 2012, pp. 188.
- (Ed. with Patricia Pisters) Revisiting Normativity with Deleuze. London and New York: Continuum, 2012, pp. 238.
- (Ed. with Rick Dolphijn) This Deleuzian Century. Leiden: Brill, 2015.
- (Ed. with Paul Gilroy) Conflicting Humanities. London: Bloomsbury, 2016.
- (Ed. with Rick Dolphijn) Philosophy After Nature. London and New York: Rowman & Littlefield, 2017.
- (Ed. with Maria Hlavajova) The Posthuman Glossary. London: Bloomsbury Publishing, 2018.
- (Ed. with Vivienne Bozalek, Tamara Shefer, and Michalinos Zembylas). Socially Just Pedagogies. Posthumanist, feminist and materialist perspectives in higher education. London and Oxford: Bloomsbury Academic, 2018.
- (Ed. with Cecilia Åsberg) A Feminist Companion to the Posthumanities. New York: Springer, 2018.
- (Ed. with Simone Bignall) Posthuman Ecologies: Complexity and Process after Deleuze. New York and London: Rowman & Littlefield, 2019.
- (Ed. with Matthew Fuller) “Transversal Posthumanities” Special issue of Theory, Culture & Society, vol. 36, no. 6, November 2019.
- (Ed. with Rick Dolphijn) Deleuze and Guattari and Fascism. Edinburgh: Edinburgh University Press, 2022.
- (Ed. with Emily Jones and Goda Klumbyte) More Posthuman Glossary. London and New York: Bloomsbury Academic, 2022.
- (Ed. with Hiltraud Casper-Hehne, Marjan Ivkoviç and Daan Oostveen) The Edinburgh Companion to the New European Humanities. Edinburgh University Press, 2024.

== Performances ==
- 2015, Music, Drugs and Emancipation: On Bach’s Coffee Cantate – Eventalk Series, Early Music Festival, Utrecht.
- 2014, Punk Women and Riot Grrls – First Supper Symposium, Oslo, Norway.
