= Hiltraud Casper-Hehne =

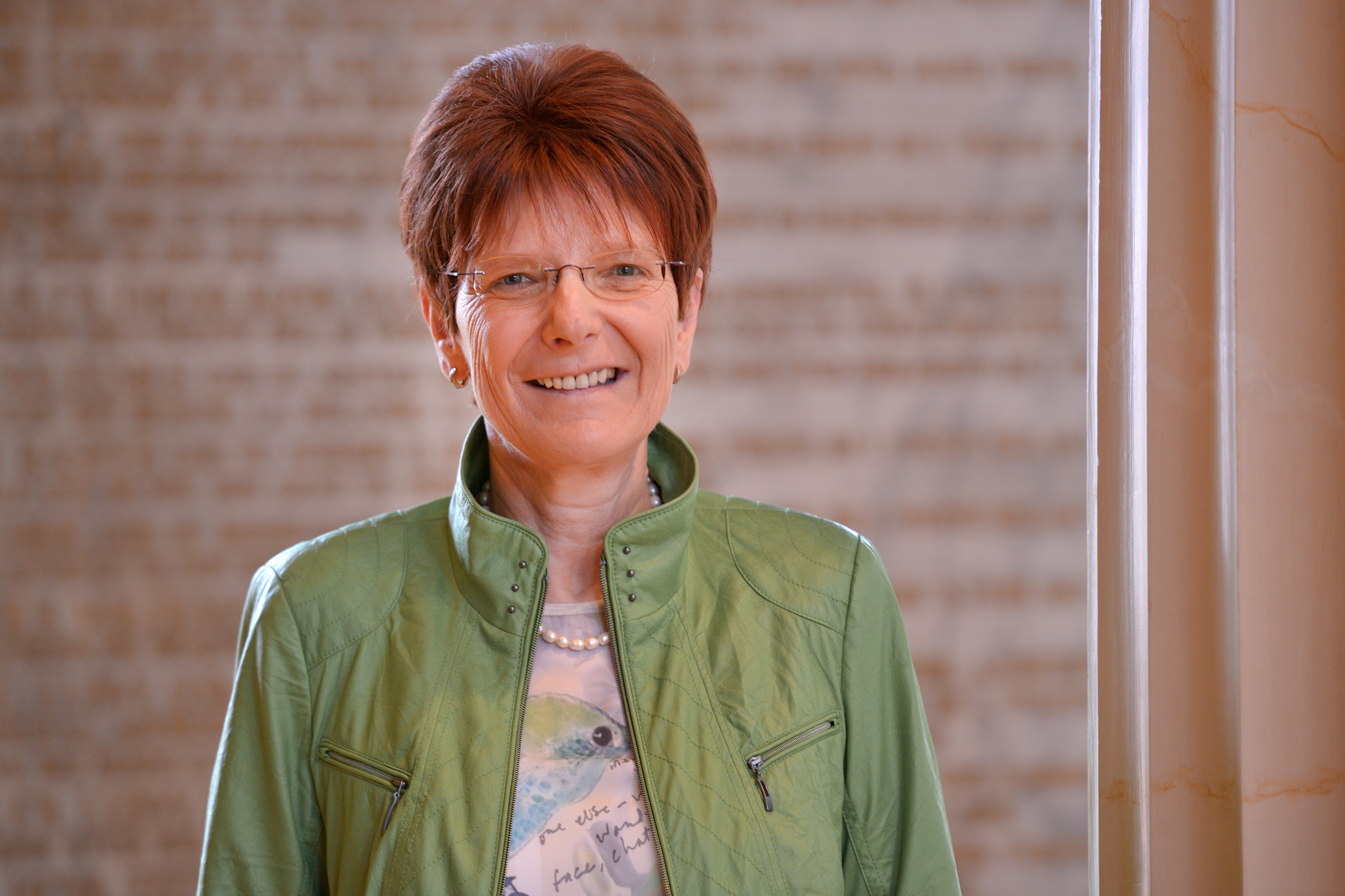
Hiltraud Casper-Hehne (2016)

Hiltraud Casper-Hehne (born in Jever, Germany, 2 June 1957) is a scholar of German studies and a university professor. Since April 2009, she has served as a vice president of the University of Ghana.

== Biography ==
Casper-Hehne studied German studies, English and history at TU-Braunschweig. She received her doctorate from the Institute for German Linguistics. In April 2004, Casper-Hehne was appointed professor of Intercultural German Studies/Linguistics at the University of Göttingen.

Casper-Hehne's area of research focuses on intercultural everyday and scientific communication, language didactics/linguistic education, migration and integration, and German as a foreign language. She developed several study programmes on German as a Foreign and Second Language to prepare students for a diverse classroom environment.

Casper-Hehne has led numerous large externally funded collaborative projects: eg, EU projects such as the online self-study programmes for European languages for students, online language learning materials for technical and managerial staff or the IDIAL and IDIAL4P EU projects, in which regionalised language teaching materials were developed for academic exchange between Germany and Eastern Europe. In addition, she launched the joint project "Interculture" as part of the EU Asia-Link higher education programme to promote cooperation between Europe and China. Through this, a double-degree joint Master's programme between Germany and China was realised. Since 2018, she has been head of the European group of researchers sponsored by the VW Foundation to develop a World Humanities Report for UNESCO.

From 2007 to 2009 she was a member of the Senate of the University of Göttingen. In April 2009, Casper-Hehne was appointed Vice President for Research and International Affairs. In April 2012, she was appointed Vice President for International Affairs of the University of Göttingen, currently appointed until 2023. As vice president, Casper-Hehne has been/is responsible for the Faculties of Law, Social Sciences, Theology, Economics and Medicine as well as the Faculty of Agricultural Sciences. She is a member of the Faculty of Humanities. From 2009 to 2012 she was responsible for the implementation of the Excellence Initiative.

Since 2013, Casper-Hehne has been a member of the Board of Directors of the European network U4Society (University of Ghent, University of Göttingen, University of Groningen, University of Uppsala, University of Tartu). She was a member of the Board of the HERA network from 2012 to 2014 and a member of the Executive Board of the Coimbra Group from 2014 to 2016. In 2014, she also chaired the council of experts for the development of the China Strategy of the German Federal Ministry of Education and Research. Since 2015, she has been a member of the Goethe-Institut's Language Advisory Board and since 2016, a member of the Board of the German Academic Exchange Service, currently serving until 2023. Since the beginning of 2018, she has been a member of the EU Ad-hoc Expert Group on European Universities.

== Awards ==
Hiltraud Casper-Hehne was awarded an honorary professorship by the Beijing Foreign Studies University in Peking in April 2010.
