= Modernism/modernity =

- Discipline: Literature
- Language: English
- Edited by: Anjali Nerlekar, Faye Hammill

Publication details
- History: 1994-present
- Publisher: Johns Hopkins University Press (United States)
- Frequency: Quarterly

Standard abbreviations
- ISO 4: Mod./Mod.

Indexing
- CODEN: MMODFU
- ISSN: 1071-6068 (print); 1080-6601 (web)
- LCCN: 94659124
- OCLC no.: 28689804

Links
- Journal homepage; Online access at Project MUSE; Journal page at publisher's website

Modernism/modernity is a quarterly peer-reviewed academic journal established in 1994 by Lawrence Rainey and Robert von Hallberg.

== History ==
It covers methodological, archival, and theoretical approaches to modernist studies in the long modernist period. Since 2000 it has been the official publication of the Modernist Studies Association.

In February 2014, the journal started operating with two editorial offices. It is published quarterly in January, April, September, and November by Johns Hopkins University Press. The journal is also available in digital form through library databases such as Project MUSE.

== Content ==
Each issue includes a section of thematic essays, multi-work review essays, individual book reviews, and a list of "recent books of interest." The journal occasionally has guest-edited or special issues, with a series of related essays on one topic. The journal has also launched an "Out of the Archives" series, in which out-of-print and neglected works of modernism are reintroduced to its readership. In 2016 the journal launched Print Plus, an open, digital publication platform designed to provide a peer-reviewed, online academic environment for multimedia argument-based research.

== Staff ==
The current editors-in-chief are Anjali Nerlekar (Rutgers University) and Faye Hammill (University of Glasgow). Previous editors include Stephen Ross (Concordia University), Anne Fernald (Fordham University), Christopher Bush (Northwestern University), Debra Rae Cohen (University of South Carolina), Ann Ardis (George Mason University; formerly University of Delaware), Cassandra Laity (Drew University), and Jeffrey Schnapp (Harvard University).

== Accolades ==
In 2003, Modernism/modernity won the Phoenix Award from the Council of Editors of Learned Journals.
