= New Literary History =

- Discipline: Literature
- Language: English
- Edited by: Bruce Holsinger

Publication details
- History: 1969-present
- Publisher: Johns Hopkins University Press (United States)
- Frequency: Quarterly

Standard abbreviations
- ISO 4: New Lit. Hist.

Indexing
- ISSN: 0028-6087 (print); 1080-661X (web)
- OCLC no.: 1296558

Links
- Journal homepage; Online access; Journal page at publisher's website; Online access at Project MUSE

New Literary History: A Journal of Theory & Interpretation is a quarterly academic journal published by Johns Hopkins University Press. It focuses on the history and theory of literature, and key questions of interpretation. The journal has received six awards from the Council of Editors of Learned Journals.

From its inception in 1969, through 2008, New Literary History was under the editorship of its founder, Ralph Cohen, who was succeeded by Rita Felski. As of 2019, it is edited by Bruce Holsinger (University of Virginia).

== History ==
New Literary History was established as part of the Sesquicentennial Celebration of the University of Virginia in 1969 by Ralph Cohen. At the time, according to Cohen, there was no "English literary journal devoted to critical theory or to a reconsideration of literary history, its nature and possibilities. New Literary History was conceived as a move against the critical current; its aim was to inquire into the theoretical bases of practical criticism and, in doing so, to reexamine the relation between past works and present critical and theoretical needs."

The journal publishes essays that deal with the nature of literary theory, the aims of literature, the idea of literary history, the reading process, hermeneutics, the relation of linguistics to literature, literary change, literary value, the definitions of periods and their uses in interpretations, the evolution of styles, conventions, and genres, as well as articles from other disciplines that help interpret or define the problems of literary history or literary study.

New Literary History played a crucial role in expanding the concerns of literary criticism beyond the close reading of individual literary texts, characteristic of the New Criticism, and in introducing British and American scholars to methodologies and theoretical approaches to literature from continental Europe. According to Wolfgang Iser,

It was Ralph Cohen's editorial policy to raise issues that were not in the orbit of the discipline when the journal was launched, such as: What is Literature, History, Interpretation, Criticism, and to what extent does the exploration of these issues require a theoretical approach? Thus basic presuppositions and assumptions of the study of literature came under close scrutiny which, in turn, had to be contextualized in order to trace the provenance of what has been posited in the theoretical approaches concerned.

The journal was characterized by "an attempt to bring Anglo-American criticism into a close interrelationship with Continental approaches to literature and culture; it gave New Literary History a unique profile." In 1999, New Literary History became "the first English-language literary journal to be translated into Chinese", with a selection of its essays translated and published annually since 2001 at Tsinghua University Press in Beijing.
