= Raia Prokhovnik =

- Born: 7 May 1951 (age 75)

Academic background
- Education: London School of Economics
- Thesis: Rhetoric and Philosophy in Hobbes' Leviathan (1981)

Academic work
- Institutions: Open University
- Main interests: Feminist political theory, sovereignty, early modern political thought
- Notable works: Rational Woman: A Feminist Critique of Dichotomy

Raia Prokhovnik (born 7 May 1951) is a scholar in political theory. She is the founding editor of the journal Contemporary Political Theory, and was a reader in politics at the Open University's Department of Politics and International Studies.

== Education ==
Her first degree was in political science and history from the University of New South Wales (1974), and her MSc and PhD, Rhetoric and Philosophy in Hobbes's Leviathan, are from the London School of Economics (1976 and 1980).

== Teaching ==
Prokhovnik spent six years teaching and research at Royal Holloway, University of London, and at the University of Southampton. She joined the Open University in 2000.

== Bibliography ==
=== Books ===
- Prokhovnik, Raia (1991). Rhetoric and philosophy in Hobbes' Leviathan. New York: Garland. ISBN 978-0-8153-0142-4.
- Prokhovnik, Raia (1999). Rational woman: a feminist critique of dichotomy. Routledge. ISBN 978-0-415-14618-0.
- Prokhovnik, Raia (2004). Spinoza and republicanism. Palgrave Macmillan. ISBN 978-0-333-73390-5.
- Prokhovnik, Raia; Huysmans, Jef; Dobson, Andrew, eds. (2006). The politics of protection: sites of insecurity and political agency. London: Routledge. ISBN 978-0-415-49916-3.
- Prokhovnik, Raia (2007). Sovereignties: contemporary theory and practice. Palgrave Macmillan. ISBN 978-1-4039-1323-4.
- Prokhovnik, Raia (2008). Sovereignty: history and theory. Imprint Academic. ISBN 978-1-84540-141-2.
- Prokhovnik, Raia; Slomp, Gabriella, eds. (2011). International political theory after Hobbes: analysis, interpretation and orientation. Palgrave Macmillan. ISBN 978-0-230-24114-5.
- Prokhovnik, Raia; Browning, Gary; Dimova-Cookson, Maria, eds. (2012). Dialogues with contemporary political theorists. Palgrave Macmillan. ISBN 978-0-230-30305-8.
- Prokhovnik, Raia, ed. (2012). Making policy, shaping lives. Edinburgh University Press. ISBN 978-1-84873-465-4.

=== Book chapters ===
- Prokhovnik, Raia (2004), "Rights and justice in international relations", in Brown, William; Bromley, Simon; Athreye, Suma (eds.), Ordering the international: history, change and transformation, Pluto Press, pp. 227–262, ISBN 978-0-7453-2137-0.
- Prokhovnik, Raia (2007), "Rationality", in Blakeley, Georgina; Bryson, Valerie (eds.), The impact of feminism on political concepts and debates, Manchester University Press, pp. 12–24, ISBN 978-0-7190-7511-7.
- Prokhovnik, Raia (2009), "Political leadership and sovereignty", in Femia, Joseph; Slomp, Gabriella; Körösényi, András (eds.), Political leadership in liberal and democratic theory, Exeter, UK: Imprint Academic, pp. 151–176, ISBN 978-1-84540-172-6.
- Prokhovnik, Raia (2011), "Hobbes, sovereignty, and politics: rethinking international political space", in Prokhovnik, Raia; Slomp, Gabriella (eds.), International political theory after Hobbes: analysis, interpretation and orientation, Palgrave Macmillan, pp. 189–212, ISBN 978-0-230-24114-5.
- Prokhovnik, Raia (2012), "Talking about policy", in Prokhovnik, Raia (ed.), Making policy, shaping lives, Edinburgh University Press, pp. 145–182, ISBN 978-1-84873-465-4.

=== Journal articles ===
- Prokhovnik, Raia; Browning, Gary (1995). "Hobbes, Hegel and modernity". Hobbes Studies. 8 (1): 88–104. doi:10.1163/187502595X00053.
- Prokhovnik, Raia (March 1996). "Sovereignty in Hobbes, Spinoza, and contemporary Europe". The European Legacy. 1 (1): 285–290. doi:10.1080/10848779608579408.
- Prokhovnik, Raia (September 1996). "Internal/external: the state of sovereignty". Contemporary Politics. 2 (3): 7–20. doi:10.1080/13569779608454736.
- Prokhovnik, Raia (January 1997). "From democracy to aristocracy: Spinoza, reason and politics". History of European Ideas. 23 (2–4): 105–115. doi:10.1016/S0191-6599(96)00012-5.
- Prokhovnik, Raia (September 1998). "Public and private citizenship: from gender invisibility to feminist inclusiveness". Feminist Review. 60 (1): 84–104. doi:10.1080/014177898339406. JSTOR 1395548. S2CID 145445422.
- Prokhovnik, Raia (April 1999). "The state of liberal sovereignty". The British Journal of Politics and International Relations. 1 (1): 63–83. doi:10.1111/1467-856X.00004. S2CID 146728672.
- Prokhovnik, Raia (January 2001). "Spinoza's conception of sovereignty". History of European Ideas. 27 (3): 289–306. doi:10.1016/S0191-6599(01)00051-1. S2CID 144496826.
- Prokhovnik, Raia (January 2005). "Hobbes's artifice as social construction". Hobbes Studies. 18 (1): 74–95. doi:10.1163/187502505X00052.
- Prokhovnik, Raia (September 2009). "'Men are not born fit for citizenship, but must be made so': Spinoza and citizenship" (PDF). Citizenship Studies. 13 (4): 413–429. doi:10.1080/13621020903011237. S2CID 40454530.
- Prokhovnik, Raia (May 2011). "An interview with Quentin Skinner". Contemporary Political Theory. 10 (2): 273–285. doi:10.1057/cpt.2010.26. S2CID 144967819.
- Prokhovnik, Raia; Ribbens McCarthy, Jane (June 2014). "Embodied relationality and caring after death" (PDF). Body & Society. 20 (2): 18–43. doi:10.1177/1357034X13506469. S2CID 8016636.
- Prokhovnik, Raia (July 2014). "Introduction: the body as a site for politics: citizenship and practices of contemporary slavery". Citizenship Studies. 18 (5): 465–484. doi:10.1080/13621025.2014.923700. S2CID 144961869.
- Prokhovnik, Raia (2015). "Thomas Hobbes and the politics of nature and artifice". Hobbes Studies. 28 (1): 1–2. doi:10.1163/18750257-02801001.
- Prokhovnik, Raia (June 2015). "From sovereignty in Australia to Australian sovereignty" (PDF). Political Science. 63 (2): 412–430. doi:10.1111/1467-9248.12069. S2CID 143104153.

== See also ==
- Feminist political theory
- Sovereignty
- Political philosophy
- Baruch Spinoza
