= Modern Drama (journal) =

- Discipline: Drama
- Language: English
- Edited by: David Kornhaber, Lawrence Switzky

Publication details
- History: 1958–present
- Publisher: University of Toronto Press (Canada)
- Frequency: Quarterly
- Open access: Hybrid open-access journal
- Impact factor: 0.3 (2022)

Standard abbreviations
- ISO 4: Mod. Drama

Indexing
- ISSN: 0026-7694 (print); 1712-5286 (web)
- LCCN: cn76308880
- OCLC no.: 1716920

Links
- Journal homepage; Online access; Online archive; Online access at Project MUSE

Modern Drama is a quarterly peer-reviewed academic journal covering studies of dramatic literature. It is published by the University of Toronto Press and the editors-in-chief are David Kornhaber and Lawrence Switzky. It was established in 1958 and largely focuses on literature of the 19th century onwards.

== Editors-in-chief ==
The following persons have been editors-in-chief:

- A.C. Edwards (Founding Editor), 1958–1972
- Ruby Cohn, 1967–1982
- Frederick J. Marker, 1972–1976
- Jill Levenson, 1977–1986
- John H. Astington, 1986–1991
- Patricia Howard, 1990–1993
- Dorothy Parker, 1993–1998
- Alan Thomas, 1993–1998
- David A. Blostein, 1995–1999
- Ric Knowles, 1999–2005
- Joanne Tompkins, 1999–2005
- W.B. Worthen, 1999–2005
- Alan Ackerman, 2005–2015
- R. Darren Gobert, 2015–2020

== Abstracting and indexing ==
The journal is abstracted and indexed in:

- Arts and Humanities Citation Index
- Current Contents/Arts & Humanities
- EBSCO databases
- International Bibliography of Periodical Literature
- Modern Language Association Database
- ProQuest databases
- Répertoire International de Littérature Musicale)
- Scopus

According to the Journal Citation Reports, the journal has a 2022 impact factor of 0.3.
