= A New Philosophy of Society =

2006 book by Manuel DeLanda

A New Philosophy of Society: Assemblage Theory and Social Complexity
- Cover
- Author: Manuel DeLanda
- Language: English
- Subject: Ontology
- Publisher: Continuum
- Publication date: 2006
- Media type: Print
- Pages: 150
- ISBN: 978-0826491695

A New Philosophy of Society: Assemblage Theory and Social Complexity is a 2006 book by the philosopher Manuel DeLanda. The book is an attempt to loosely define a new ontology for use by social theorists — one that challenges the existing paradigm of meaningful social analyses being possible only on the level of either individuals (micro-reductionism) or "society as a whole" (macro-reductionism). Instead, the book employs Gilles Deleuze's and Félix Guattari's theory of assemblages from A Thousand Plateaus (1980) to posit social entities on all scales (from sub-individual to transnational) that are best analysed through their components (themselves assemblages).

== Main ideas ==
Components are characterized along two primary axes/dimensions: a material-expressive axis which defines the variable roles a component may play, and a territorializing-deterritorializing axis indicating processes in which a component is involved. These components are defined by relations of exteriority, that is, their "role" within a larger assemblage is not what defines them (this would be a relation of interiority). This means that a component is self-subsistent and may be "unplugged" from one assemblage and "plugged" into another without losing its identity. A third axis defines processes in which specialized expressive media (genetic/linguistic resources) intervene in "coding"/"decoding" the assemblage.

According to DeLanda, following Deleuze's ideas of difference and repetition (what DeLanda calls "variable repetition"), assemblages necessarily exist in heterogeneous populations. The relationship between an assemblage and its components is complex and non-linear: assemblages are formed and affected by heterogeneous populations of lower-level assemblages, but may also act back upon these components, imposing restraints or adaptations in them.

DeLanda merges Deleuze's ideas of both assemblages and strata into his model of assemblages, regarding the distinction as inconsequential in the context of A New Philosophy of Society. He does however maintain the idea of assemblages as non-essentialist (they are historically contingent actual entities, not instances of ideal forms) and non-totalizing (assemblages are not seamless totalities but collections of heterogeneous components that should be analysed as such).

== Examples ==
As an example of an assemblage (as defined by DeLanda) consider an ecosystem:

- The material role here is performed by the soil, sunlight, trees, animals, etc.
- The expressive role is performed by the forms, colours, habits, etc. of the aforementioned components.
- The territorializing role would be played by factors such as food chains, adaptive traits, conducive climate and other elements that maintain the components and their relationships and thus the identity and durability of the assemblage.
- The deterritorializing role would be played by such factors as climate change, invasion by exotic species, evolutionary mutation and other elements that recombine or replace various components and roles within the assemblage, leading to its dissipation or reformulation.
- A linguistic/coding role could be played by an environmental discourse seeking to protect an ecosystem.

Consistent with DeLanda's materialist position, the book also includes as a secondary task a sustained criticism of the primacy of post-modernist linguistic analysis in social science (the theory of the linguistics of experience).
