= William E. Connolly =

American political theorist (1938–2026)

- Born: William Eugene Connollly; January 6, 1938; Flint, Michigan, U.S.
- Died: February 25, 2026 (aged 88)

Education
- Education: University of Michigan

Philosophical work
- Era: Contemporary philosophy
- Region: Western philosophy
- School: Continental philosophy
- Main interests: Political theory, political philosophy, international relations, pluralism, political ecology
- Notable ideas: Agonistic democracy, immanent naturalism, new pluralism, neuropolitics, sociocentrism, Weak ontology

William Eugene Connolly (January 6, 1938 – February 25, 2026) was an American political theorist known for his work on democracy, pluralism and capitalism. He was the Krieger-Eisenhower Professor of Political Science at Johns Hopkins University. His 1974 work The Terms of Political Discourse won the 1999 Benjamin Lippincott Award.

== Early life and education ==
Connolly was raised in the town of Flint, Michigan. His father was of one of the nearly 80,000 people who worked for General Motors in Flint during its peak years. Connolly received his B.A. from University of Michigan at Flint and went to get his Ph.D. at University of Michigan, Ann Arbor.

== Career ==
Connolly took up an assistant professorship at Ohio University from 1965 to 1968, then an assistant professorship at the University of Massachusetts Amherst from 1968 to 1971. He later went on to become an associate professor from 1971 to 1974 and professor from 1974 to 1985. Connolly took up a professorship in 1985 at Johns Hopkins University and was the department chair for Political Science from 1996 to 2003. He remained the Krieger-Eisenhower Professor. Connolly has taught as a visiting professor at numerous schools including The University of Exeter, European University Institute, Oxford University, and Boston College. His book The Terms of Political Discourse won the Benjamin Evans Lippincott Award in 1999: the book is widely held to be a major work of political theory. In 2004, he won the Fulbright Award to deliver the keynote address at the Kyoto Conference in Japan. In 2013, Connolly delivered the inaugural Neal A. Maxwell Lecture in Political Theory and Contemporary Politics at the University of Utah entitled “Species Evolution and Cultural Freedom.” It was subsequently published as part of a symposium in Political Research Quarterly. Connolly was also a contributing writer to The Huffington Post and a founding member of the journal Theory & Event.

Connolly died on February 25, 2026, at the age of 88.

== Political theory ==
=== Theory of pluralism ===
Over the course of the last four decades Connolly has helped to remake the theory of pluralism. Connolly challenges older theories of pluralism by arguing for pluralization as a goal rather than as a state of affairs. Connolly's argument for the "multiplication of factions" follows James Madison's logic in engaging groups, constituencies, and voters at both the micro and macro level. Essentially, he has shifted the theory from a conservative theory of order, to a progressive theory of democratic contestation and engagement. By engaging Nietzsche and Foucault, Connolly explores the nature of democratic contestation and its relation to pluralism. A more comprehensive look at pluralism can be found in the work Pluralism.

An extensive engagement with Connolly can be found in The New Pluralism (Duke University Press, 2008), edited by David Campbell and Morton Schoolman. There Morton Schoolman, Thomas Dumm, George Kateb, Wendy Brown, Stephen White, Bonnie Honig, Roland Bleiker, Michael Shapiro, Kathy Ferguson, James Der Derian, and David Campbell engage with his accounts of pluralism, cosmopolitanism, agonistic respect, subjectivity, politics and global capitalism. The book closes with an interview in which the editors invite Connolly to clarify several themes and to outline his future work. This work has been acknowledged as an authoritative text on Connolly's thought.

=== Agonistic democracy ===
Connolly is one of the founders of this subfield of thought in political theory. He promotes the possibility of an "agonistic democracy", where he finds positive ways to engage certain aspects of political conflict. Connolly proposes a positive ethos of engagement, which could be used to debate political differences. Agonism is based on contestation, but in a political space where the discourse is one of respect, rather than violence. However, Connolly is cautious on speculating whether this imaginary could come true, because he claims the value of such speculation is overrated. Also, his critical challenges to John Rawls's theory of justice and Jürgen Habermas's theory on deliberative democracy have spawned a host of new literature in this area. His work Identity\Difference contains an exhaustive look at positive possibilities via democratic contestation.

=== Secularism ===
Connolly has explored some of the problematic aspects of secularism. He notes the predictive failure of secularists in the 1970s, who theorized it would be the most dominant view in the public sphere, only to be proven wrong by the Evangelical movement that dominated politics for two decades soon after. He writes that, "Secularism is not merely the division between public and private realms that allows religious diversity to flourish in the latter. It can itself be a carrier of harsh exclusions. And it secretes a new definition of "religion" that conceals some of its most problematic practices from itself." Connolly has also written on the relationship between religion and faith in politics, arguing for non-believers to respect the views of the faithful, who make up a large portion of the electorate. His work, Why I am Not a Secularist explores some of these ideas in further detail.

"Echoing his early critique of value-neutrality, Connolly charges liberal secularists for failing to acknowledge... the ways their own parochial sensibilities and metaphysical investments infuse their supposedly neutral statements about a post-metaphysical public reason. Connolly calls for a post-secularist politics that admits the ubiquity of faith in order to negotiate across these embodied registers of difference rather than claim, and fail, to transcend them."

=== Neuropolitics ===
Drawing on recent research in neuroscience on the role of affect in cognition, along with the theories of thinkers such as Baruch Spinoza, Henri Bergson, and William James, Connolly plumbs the depths of the “visceral register”, both in Why I am Not a Secularist (2000) and particularly in his 2002 book Neuropolitics. "Rationalist and deliberative theories of democracy fail to grasp the ways visceral modes of appraisal affect political thinking below the conscious register of reasons and argument alone. Moods, affects, and instincts of considerable intensity infuse both subjectivity and intersubjectivity with powerful cultural investments. The existence of this register of experience transgresses any neat compartmentalization of private spirituality from public reason. Echoing his early critique of value-neutrality, Connolly charges liberal secularists for failing to acknowledge the role of the visceral register in their own thinking and the ways their own parochial sensibilities and metaphysical investments infuse their supposedly neutral statements about a post-metaphysical public reason."

=== Capitalism and ecology ===
In his recent books, Connolly has explored the relations between capitalism, inequality and ecology. In Capitalism and Christianity, American Style (2008) he explores the formation of the “evangelical-capitalist resonance machine” in the States, explaining how it has made the United States an outlier among the older capitalist states with respect to inequality and climate denialism. Reviewing the book for the Political Theory journal, University of Wisconsin-Madison political theorist Robert Fowler writes: "Whether it is theory or practice that he addresses, Connolly always moves with an eye to enhancing certain attitudes: a disposition toward uncertainty; an openness to any approach that might give insight; a rejection of any tight system; avoidance of the danger posed by a life or a politics of resentment. Above all, Connolly lauds an attitude that recognizes the tragic in life (serving to blunt dangerous faiths in a providential God or in the blessings of the market), while at the same time eagerly welcoming a determination to change the world for the better. Finally, Connolly insists that his ardent desire for change does not negate an attitude of human "gratitude for this world" (p. 144) nor suck dry the ineffable "sweetness of life" (p. 146)."

In The Fragility of Things (2013), he criticizes neoliberalism for its quaint focus on only one self-organizing system—markets. It is not only that markets are also subject to elite manipulation, but it's also the case that neoliberal states bump into a whole series of nonhuman processes with self-organizing powers of their own. When you consider these interconnected systems together the fragility of capitalism comes into view and the irrationality of neoliberal ideals of market autonomy shines through. In a recent book, Facing the Planetary: Entangled Humanism and the Politics of Swarming (2017) Connolly reviews how the earth scientists belatedly exploded their previous notions of “planetary gradualism” in the 1980s. After discussing how climate, glacier flows, species evolution and the ocean conveyor have gone through periods of stability punctuated by rather rapid changes, he pursues a philosophy of “entangled humanism” and a “politics of swarming” to respond to the contemporary conjunction between bumpy, self-organizing planetary forces and contemporary capitalism as a geologic force.

== Critics ==
In a 2008 national survey of political theorists, based on 1,086 responses from professors at accredited, four-year colleges and universities in the United States, William E. Connolly was voted 4th on the list of "Scholars Who Have Had the Greatest Impact on Political Theory in the Past 20 Years", behind John Rawls, Jürgen Habermas, and Michel Foucault. Connolly was also voted 3rd on the list of "Scholars Doing Excellent Work Today Whose Work Will Be Influential during the Next 20 Years".

UCLA political theorist Joshua F. Dienstag writes: "Contestable or not, I will just go ahead and say it: William Connolly is the most influential political theorist writing in English today."

Peter Price criticizes what he takes to be Connolly's attempt to redeem capitalism. He writes that "any system in which people's ability to obtain as much work as they want, sends the economic components of the system into inflationary spirals and other harmful consequences, treating human wastage, social and cultural damage, as a regrettable but necessary by-product, is not a system that lends itself easily to redemption". In contrast, Robert Booth Fowler, professor emeritus of political science at the University of Wisconsin, writes that to Connolly "American capitalism and Christianity work together...at all levels of society in ways which violate [Connolly's] main goals: a dramatically more egalitarian society, an environmentally responsible nation and world, and a deep respect for human diversity".

Harvard University theorist Cornel West writes that "William E. Connolly is a towering figure in contemporary political theory whose profound reflections on democracy, religion, and the tragic unsettle and enrich us."

Caleb Henry, in The Journal of Church and State, raises a few questions about Connolly's views. "Can immanent naturalism present a defensible ethic? Can his morality defend against a warrior morality? Might not a Nietzsche-influenced immanent naturalist tend towards elitism rather than egalitarianism? Can Connolly authoritatively argue that no preferences transcend cultural formation of personal identity?"

In a 2015 interview with Bradley Macdonald, Connolly addresses his engagements with activism and ecology from the 1970s to today (as of 2015), reviews his relations to other theories of political economy, debates his critique of “sociocentrism” in the human sciences, and discusses why students of politics must become much more attuned to recent work in the earth sciences.

== Bibliography ==
=== Books (as author) ===
- Political science and ideology. New Brunswick, New Jersey: Transaction Publishers. 2006. ISBN 9780202308517. (Reissue of 1967 book.)
- The terms of political discourse (3rd ed.). Oxford: Blackwell. 1993. ISBN 9780631189596. (First edition was 1974.)
- Connolly, William E.; Best, Michael H. (1976). The politicized economy. Lexington, Massachusetts: Heath. ISBN 9780669971620.
- Appearance and reality in politics. Cambridge New York: Cambridge University Press. 1981. ISBN 9780521230261.
- Politics and ambiguity. Madison, Wisconsin: University of Wisconsin Press. 1987. ISBN 9780299109905.
- Political theory and modernity. Oxford, UK New York: B. Blackwell. 1989. ISBN 9780631170341.
- Identity, difference democratic negotiations of political paradox (revised ed.). Minneapolis, Minnesota: University of Minnesota Press. 2002. ISBN 9780816640867. (First edition was 1991.)
- The Augustinian imperative: a reflection on the politics of morality (1st ed.). Newbury Park: Sage Publications. 1993. ISBN 9780803936362.
  Revised as: The Augustinian imperative: a reflection on the politics of morality (2nd ed.). Lanham, Maryland: Rowman & Littlefield. 2002. ISBN 9780742521476.
- The Ethos of Pluralization. Minneapolis, Minnesota: University of Minnesota Press. 1995. ISBN 9780816626687.
- Connolly, William (1999). Why I Am Not a Secularist. Minneapolis, Minnesota: University of Minnesota Press. ISBN 9780816633326.
- Connolly, William (2002). Neuropolitics: thinking, culture, speed. Minneapolis, Minnesota: University of Minnesota Press -. ISBN 9780816640225.
- Connolly, William (2005). Pluralism. Durham, North Carolina: Duke University Press. ISBN 9780822335672.
- Connolly, William (2008). Capitalism and Christianity, American style. Durham, North Carolina: Duke University Press. ISBN 9780822342724.
- Connolly, William E. (17 January 2011). A world of becoming. A John Hope Franklin Center book. Durham, North Carolina: Duke University Press. doi:10.1215/9780822393511. ISBN 978-0-8223-4863-4. OCLC 503827857. doi:10.2307/j.ctv11316sf.
- Connolly, William E. (2 September 2013). The fragility of things: Self-organizing processes, neoliberal fantasies, and democratic activism. Durham, North Carolina: Duke University Press. doi:10.1215/9780822377160. ISBN 978-0-8223-5570-0. OCLC 842209193. doi:10.2307/j.ctv123x75n.
- Connolly, William (2017). Facing the Planetary: Entangled Humanism and the Politics of Swarming. Durham, North Carolina: Duke University Press. ISBN 9780822363309.
- Connolly, William (2017). Aspirational Fascism: The Struggle for Multifaceted Democracy under Trumpism. Minneapolis, Minnesota: University of Minnesota Press. ISBN 9781517905125.
- Connolly, William E. (2019). Climate Machines, Fascist Drives, and Truth. Durham, North Carolina: Duke University Press. ISBN 9781478005896. OCLC 1082224594.

=== Books (as editor) ===
- Bias of pluralism. New York, New York: Atherton Press. 1969. OCLC 23640.
- Social structure and political theory. Lexington, Massachusetts: Heath. 1974. ISBN 9780669839234. – with Glen Gordon
- Legitimacy and the state. Oxford: Blackwell. 1984. ISBN 9780855206468.
- Democracy and vision: Sheldon Wolin and the vicissitudes of the political. Princeton, New Jersey: Princeton University Press. 2001. ISBN 9780691074665. – with Aryeh Botwinick

Series editor

- Series editor. "Contestations: Cornell Studies in Political Theory". Cornell University Press. Archived from the original on April 14, 2012.

- Titles in the Contestations series:

- Orlie, Melissa (1997). Living ethically, acting politically. Cornell University Press. ISBN 9780801484728.
- Seery, John (1996). Political theory for mortals: shades of justice, images of death. Cornell University Press. ISBN 9780801483769.
- Zerilli, Linda (1994). Signifying woman: culture and chaos in Rousseau, Burke, and Mill. Cornell University Press. ISBN 9780801481772.
- Kateb, George (1992). The inner ocean: individualism and democratic culture. Cornell University Press. ISBN 9780801480140.
- Honig, Bonnie (1993). Political theory and the displacement of politics. ISBN 9780801480720.

=== Journal articles ===
- Connolly, William E. (August 1985). "Taylor, Foucault, and otherness". Political Theory. 13 (3): 365–376. doi:10.1177/0090591785013003004. S2CID 143844070.
- Connolly, William E. (October 2000). "Speed, concentric cultures, and cosmopolitanism". Political Theory. 28 (5): 596–618. doi:10.1177/0090591700028005002. S2CID 144375896.
- Connolly, William E. (December 2005). "The evangelical-capitalist resonance machine". Political Theory. 33 (6): 869–886. doi:10.1177/0090591705280376. S2CID 144642777.
- Connolly, William E. (Summer 2006). "Experience & experiment". Daedalus. 135 (3): 67–75. doi:10.1162/daed.2006.135.3.67. S2CID 57570206.
- Connolly, William E. (June 2013). "Biology, politics, creativity". Perspectives on Politics. 11 (2): 508–511. doi:10.1017/S1537592713000935. S2CID 145450180.

== See also ==
- Sheldon Wolin
