= George Kateb =

American writer and professor

- Born: February 27, 1931 (age 95)

Education
- Education: Columbia University (AB, MA, PhD)

Philosophical work
- Institutions: Princeton University; Amherst College

George Anthony Kateb is William Nelson Cromwell Professor of Politics, Emeritus, at Princeton University.

== Life ==
Kateb earned his A.B., A.M. and Ph.D. at Columbia University and was a Junior Fellow at Harvard University. His PhD dissertation, defended in 1956, was titled "The Political and Social Thought of Simone Weil (1909-1943)." He then taught at Amherst College for thirty years before joining the faculty at Princeton in 1987. As a member of the executive committee of the University Center for Human Values he was involved with the search committee that appointed the Australian philosopher Peter Singer to a chair in bioethics at Princeton in 1999.

Kateb is a member of the American Academy of Arts and Sciences. He has also served as vice president of the American Society of Political and Legal Philosophy and president of the New England Political Science Association. He has also served as a member of the editorial board or consulting editor of the Journal of the History of Ideas, the Library of America, Alternative Futures, the American Political Science Review, Political Theory, and Raritan Quarterly Review. He is a recipient of the Behrman Award for Distinguished Achievement in the Humanities from Princeton. He retired from teaching in 2002.

== Research ==
According to Leo Marx, "Kateb's main purpose is to reveal the subtlety and profundity of the American ideal of democratic individuality."

== Bibliography ==
- Utopia and Its Enemies (1963)
- Political Theory: Its Nature and Uses (1968)
- Hannah Arendt: Politics, Conscience, Evil (1984)
- The Inner Ocean: Individualism and Democratic Culture (1992)
- Emerson and Self-Reliance (1994)
- Patriotism and Other Mistakes (2006)
- Human Dignity (2011)
