= Socratic method =

Type of cooperative argumentative dialogue

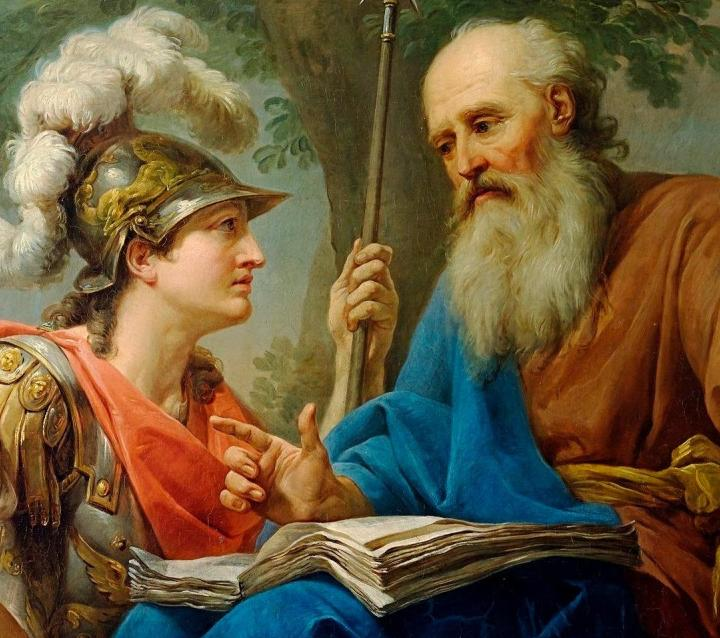
Marcello Bacciarelli's Alcibiades Being Taught by Socrates (1776)

The Socratic method is a form of argumentative dialogue in which an individual probes a conversation partner on a topic, using questions and clarifications, until the partner is pressed to come to a conclusion on their own, or else their reasoning breaks down and they are forced to admit ignorance. The method is also known as Socratic debate, the maieutic method, or the Socratic dialectic, and sometimes equated with the Greek term elenchus. Socratic dialogues between characters employing this method feature in many of the works of the ancient Greek philosopher Plato, where a fictionalized version of his real-life teacher Socrates debates or expounds upon various philosophical issues with a partner.

In Plato's dialogue Theaetetus, Socrates describes his method as a form of "midwifery" (maieutikós; source of the English adjective maieutic) because it is employed to help his interlocutors develop their understanding and lead it out of them in a way analogous to a child developing in the womb until it is ready for birth. The Socratic method begins with commonly held beliefs and scrutinizes them by way of questioning to determine their internal consistency and their coherence with other beliefs and so to bring everyone closer to the truth.

In modified forms, it is employed today in a variety of pedagogical contexts.

== Development ==
In the second half of the 5th century BC, sophists were teachers who specialized in using the tools of philosophy and rhetoric to entertain, impress, or persuade an audience to accept the speaker's point of view. Socrates promoted an alternative method of teaching, which came to be called the Socratic method.

Socrates began to engage in such discussions with his fellow Athenians after his friend from youth, Chaerephon, visited the Oracle of Delphi, which asserted that no man in Greece was wiser than Socrates. Socrates saw this as a paradox, and began using the Socratic method to answer his conundrum. Diogenes Laërtius, however, wrote that Protagoras invented the "Socratic" method.

Plato famously formalized the Socratic elenctic style in prose—presenting Socrates as the curious questioner of some prominent Athenian interlocutor—in some of his early dialogues, such as Euthyphro and Ion, and the method is most commonly found within the so-called "Socratic dialogues", which generally portray Socrates engaging in the method and questioning his fellow citizens about moral and epistemological issues. But in his later dialogues, such as Theaetetus or Sophist, Plato had a different method to philosophical discussions, namely dialectic.

== Method ==
Elenchus (Ancient Greek: ἔλεγχος, romanized: elenkhos, lit. 'argument of disproof or refutation; cross-examining, testing, scrutiny esp. for purposes of refutation') is the central technique of the Socratic method. The Latin form elenchus (plural elenchi) is used in English as the technical philosophical term. The most common adjectival form in English is elenctic; elenchic and elenchtic are also current. This was also very important in Plato's early dialogues.

Socrates (as depicted by Plato) generally applied his method of examination to concepts such as the virtues of piety, wisdom, temperance, courage, and justice. Such an examination challenged the implicit moral beliefs of the interlocutors, bringing out inadequacies and inconsistencies in their beliefs, and usually resulting in aporia. In view of such inadequacies, Socrates himself professed ignorance. Socrates said that his awareness of his ignorance made him wiser than those who, though ignorant, still claimed knowledge. This claim was based on a reported Delphic oracular pronouncement that no man was wiser than Socrates. While this belief seems paradoxical at first glance, in fact it allowed Socrates to discover his own errors.

Socrates used this claim of wisdom as the basis of moral exhortation. He claimed that the chief goodness consists in the caring of the soul concerned with moral truth and moral understanding, that "wealth does not bring goodness, but goodness brings wealth and every other blessing, both to the individual and to the state", and that "life without examination [dialogue] is not worth living". Socrates rarely used the method to actually develop consistent theories, and he even made frequent use of creative myths and allegories. The Parmenides dialogue shows Parmenides using the Socratic method to point out the flaws in the Platonic theory of forms, as presented by Socrates; it is not the only dialogue in which theories normally expounded by Plato's Socrates are broken down through dialectic. Instead of arriving at answers, the method breaks down the theories we hold, to go "beyond" the axioms and postulates we take for granted. Therefore, myth and the Socratic method are not meant by Plato to be incompatible; they have different purposes, and are often described as the "left hand" and "right hand" paths to good and wisdom.

=== Scholarly debate ===
In Plato's early dialogues, the elenchus is the technique Socrates uses to investigate, for example, the nature or definition of ethical concepts such as justice or virtue. According to Gregory Vlastos, it has the following steps:

1. Socrates' interlocutor asserts a thesis, for example "Courage is endurance of the soul".
2. Socrates decides whether the thesis is false and targets for refutation.
3. Socrates secures his interlocutor's agreement to further premises, for example "Courage is a fine thing" and "Ignorant endurance is not a fine thing".
4. Socrates then argues, and the interlocutor agrees, these further premises imply the contrary of the original thesis; in this case, it leads to: "courage is not endurance of the soul".
5. Socrates then claims he has shown his interlocutor's thesis is false and its negation is true.

One elenctic examination can lead to a new, more refined, examination of the concept being considered, in this case it invites an examination of the claim: "Courage is wise endurance of the soul". Most Socratic inquiries consist of a series of elenchi and typically end in puzzlement known as aporia.

Michael Frede points out Vlastos' conclusion in step No. 5 above makes nonsense of the aporetic nature of the early dialogues. Having shown a proposed thesis is false is insufficient to conclude some other competing thesis must be true. Rather, the interlocutors have reached aporia, an improved state of still not knowing what to say about the subject under discussion.

The exact nature of the elenchus is subject to a great deal of debate, in particular concerning whether it is a positive method, leading to knowledge, or a negative method used solely to refute false claims to knowledge. Some qualitative research shows that the use of the Socratic method within a traditional Yeshiva education setting helps students succeed in law school, although it remains an open question as to whether that relationship is causal or merely correlative.

Yet, W. K. C. Guthrie in The Greek Philosophers sees it as an error to regard the Socratic method as a means by which one seeks the answer to a problem, or knowledge. Guthrie claims that the Socratic method actually aims to demonstrate one's ignorance. Socrates, unlike the Sophists, did believe that knowledge was possible, but believed that the first step to knowledge was recognition of one's ignorance. Guthrie writes, "[Socrates] was accustomed to say that he did not himself know anything, and that the only way in which he was wiser than other men was that he was conscious of his own ignorance, while they were not. The essence of the Socratic method is to convince the interlocutor that whereas he thought he knew something, in fact he does not."

== Modern applications ==
=== Socratic seminar ===
A Socratic seminar (also known as a Socratic circle) is a pedagogical approach based on the Socratic method and uses a dialogic approach to understand information in a text. Its systematic procedure is used to examine a text through questions and answers founded on the beliefs that all new knowledge is connected to prior knowledge, that all thinking comes from asking questions, and that asking one question should lead to asking further questions. A Socratic seminar is not a debate. The goal of this activity is to have participants work together to construct meaning and arrive at an answer, not for one student or one group to "win the argument".

This approach is based on the belief that participants seek and gain deeper understanding of concepts in the text through thoughtful dialogue rather than memorizing information that has been provided for them. While Socratic seminars can differ in structure, and even in name, they typically involve a passage of text that students must read beforehand and facilitate dialogue. Sometimes, a facilitator will structure two concentric circles of students: an outer circle and an inner circle. The inner circle focuses on exploring and analysing the text through the act of questioning and answering. During this phase, the outer circle remains silent. Students in the outer circle are much like scientific observers watching and listening to the conversation of the inner circle. When the text has been fully discussed and the inner circle is finished talking, the outer circle provides feedback on the dialogue that took place. This process alternates with the inner circle students going to the outer circle for the next meeting and vice versa. The length of this process varies depending on the text used for the discussion. The teacher may decide to alternate groups within one meeting, or they may alternate at each separate meeting.

The most significant difference between this activity and most typical classroom activities involves the role of the teacher. In Socratic seminar, the students lead the discussion and questioning. The teacher's role is to ensure the discussion advances regardless of the particular direction the discussion takes.

==== Various approaches to Socratic seminar ====
Teachers use Socratic seminar in different ways. The structure it takes may look different in each classroom. While this is not an exhaustive list, teachers may use one of the following structures to administer Socratic seminar:

1. Inner/outer circle or fishbowl: Students need to be arranged in inner and outer circles. The inner circle engages in discussion about the text. The outer circle observes the inner circle, while taking notes. The outer circle shares their observations and questions the inner circle with guidance from the teacher/facilitator. Students use constructive criticism as opposed to making judgements. The students on the outside keep track of topics they would like to discuss as part of the debrief. Participants in the outer circle can use an observation checklist or notes form to monitor the participants in the inner circle. These tools will provide structure for listening and give the outside members specific details to discuss later in the seminar. The teacher may also sit in the circle but at the same height as the students.
2. Triad: Students are arranged so that each participant (called a "pilot") in the inner circle has two "co-pilots" sitting behind them on either side. Pilots are the speakers because they are in the inner circle; co-pilots are in the outer circle and only speak during consultation. The seminar proceeds as any other seminar. At a point in the seminar, the facilitator pauses the discussion and instructs the triad to talk to each other. Conversation will be about topics that need more in-depth discussion or a question posed by the leader. Sometimes triads will be asked by the facilitator to come up with a new question. Any time during a triad conversation, group members can switch seats and one of the co-pilots can sit in the pilot's seat. Only during that time is the switching of seats allowed. This structure allows for students to speak, who may not yet have the confidence to speak in the large group. This type of seminar involves all students instead of just the students in the inner and outer circles.
3. Simultaneous seminars: Students are arranged in multiple small groups and placed as far as possible from each other. Following the guidelines of the Socratic seminar, students engage in small group discussions. Simultaneous seminars are typically done with experienced students who need little guidance and can engage in a discussion without assistance from a teacher/facilitator. According to the literature, this type of seminar is beneficial for teachers who want students to explore a variety of texts around a main issue or topic. Each small group may have a different text to read/view and discuss. A larger Socratic seminar can then occur as a discussion about how each text corresponds with one another. Simultaneous seminars can also be used for a particularly difficult text. Students can work through different issues and key passages from the text.

No matter what structure the teacher employs, the basic premise of the seminar/circles is to turn partial control and direction of the classroom over to the students. The seminars encourage students to work together, creating meaning from the text and to stay away from trying to find a correct interpretation. The emphasis is on critical and creative thinking.

==== Text selection ====
===== Socratic seminar texts =====
A Socratic seminar text is a tangible document that creates a thought-provoking discussion. The text ought to be appropriate for the participants' current level of intellectual and social development. It provides the anchor for dialogue whereby the facilitator can bring the participants back to the text if they begin to digress. Furthermore, the seminar text enables the participants to create a level playing field – ensuring that the dialogical tone within the classroom remains consistent and pure to the subject or topic at hand. Some practitioners argue that "texts" do not have to be confined to printed texts, but can include artifacts such as objects, physical spaces, and the like.

===== Pertinent elements of an effective Socratic text =====
Socratic seminar texts are able to challenge participants' thinking skills by having these characteristics:

1. Ideas and values: The text must introduce ideas and values that are complex and difficult to summarize. Powerful discussions arise from personal connections to abstract ideas and from implications to personal values.
2. Complexity and challenge: The text must be rich in ideas and complexity and open to interpretation. Ideally it should require multiple readings, but should be neither far above the participants' intellectual level nor very long.
3. Relevance to participants' curriculum: An effective text has identifiable themes that are recognizable and pertinent to the lives of the participants. Themes in the text should relate to the curriculum.
4. Ambiguity: The text must be approachable from a variety of different perspectives, including perspectives that seem mutually exclusive, thus provoking critical thinking and raising important questions. The absence of right and wrong answers promotes a variety of discussion and encourages individual contributions.

===== Two different ways to select a text =====
Socratic texts can be divided into two main categories:

1. Print texts (e.g., short stories, poems, and essays) and non-print texts (e.g., photographs, sculptures, and maps); and
2. Subject area, which can draw from print or non-print artifacts. As examples, language arts can be approached through poems, history through written or oral historical speeches, science through policies on environmental issues, math through mathematical proofs, health through nutrition labels, and physical education through fitness guidelines.

==== Questioning methods ====
Socratic seminars are based upon the interaction of peers. The focus is to explore multiple perspectives on a given issue or topic. Socratic questioning is used to help students apply the activity to their learning. The pedagogy of Socratic questions is open-ended, focusing on broad, general ideas rather than specific, factual information. The questioning technique emphasizes a level of questioning and thinking where there is no single right answer.

Socratic seminars generally start with an open-ended question proposed either by the leader or by another participant. There is no designated first speaker; as individuals participate in Socratic dialogue, they gain experience that enables them to be effective in this role of initial questioner.

The leader keeps the topic focused by asking a variety of questions about the text itself, as well as questions to help clarify positions when arguments become confused. The leader also seeks to coax reluctant participants into the discussion, and to limit contributions from those who tend to dominate. She or he prompts participants to elaborate on their responses and to build on what others have said. The leader guides participants to deepen, clarify, and paraphrase, and to synthesize a variety of different views.

The participants share the responsibility with the leader to maintain the quality of the Socratic circle. They listen actively to respond effectively to what others have contributed. This teaches the participants to think and speak persuasively using the discussion to support their position. Participants must demonstrate respect for different ideas, thoughts and values, and must not interrupt each other.

Questions can be created individually or in small groups. All participants are given the opportunity to take part in the discussion. Socratic circles specify three types of questions to prepare:

1. Opening questions generate discussion at the beginning of the seminar in order to elicit dominant themes.
2. Guiding questions help deepen and elaborate the discussion, keeping contributions on topic and encouraging a positive atmosphere and consideration for others.
3. Closing questions lead participants to summarize their thoughts and learning and personalize what they've discussed.

=== Challenges and disadvantages ===
Scholars such as Peter Boghossian acknowledge that the Socratic method can foster creative and critical thinking through the use of perplexity. However, Boghossian cautions against misapplications of the method that may inadvertently induce shame or humiliation. In his defence of Socratic pedagogy, he argues that while cognitive dissonance is essential to philosophical inquiry, educators must carefully distinguish between productive discomfort and harmful exposure, ensuring that students are not ridiculed or undermined in the process.

Some have countered this thought by stating that the humiliation and ridicule is not caused by the method, rather it is due to the lack of knowledge of the student. Boghossian mentions that even though the questions may be perplexing, they are not originally meant for it, in fact such questions provoke the students and can be countered by employing counterexamples.

== Psychotherapy ==
The Socratic method, in the form of Socratic questioning, has been adapted for psychotherapy, most prominently in classical Adlerian psychotherapy, logotherapy, rational emotive behavior therapy, cognitive therapy and reality therapy. It can be used to clarify meaning, feeling, and consequences, as well as to gradually unfold insight, or explore alternative actions.

The Socratic method has also recently inspired a new form of applied philosophy: Socratic dialogue, also called philosophical counseling. In Europe Gerd B. Achenbach is probably the best known practitioner, and Michel Weber has also proposed another variant of the practice.

== See also ==
- Devil's advocate
- Harkness table – a teaching method based on the Socratic method
- Just asking questions
- Marva Collins
- Pedagogy
- The Paper Chase – 1973 film based on a 1971 novel of the same name, dramatizing the use of the Socratic method in law school classes
- Socrates Cafe
- Socratic questioning
- Socratic irony
