= Nicola Velotti =

Italian psychoanalyst

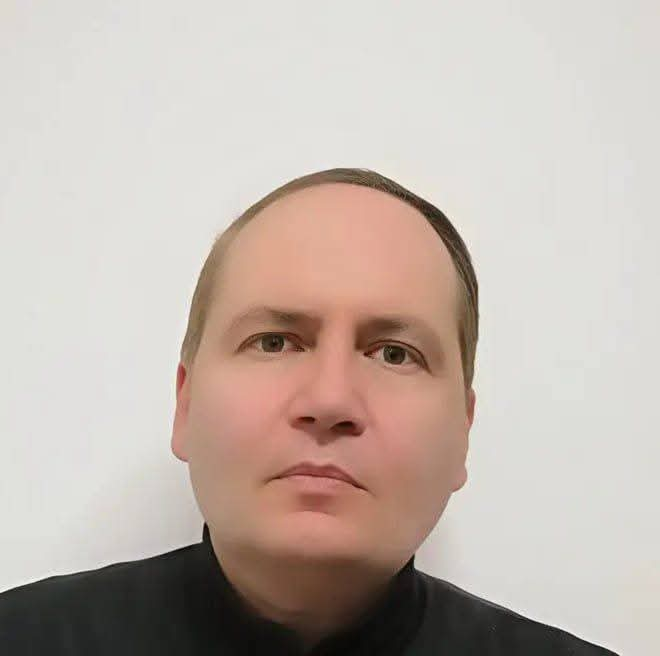
- Born: November 11, 1964 (age 61); Casamarciano, Italy
- Occupations: Psychoanalysis, art therapy, philosophical counseling
- Known for: Italian Manifesto of Art Therapy (1991); Italian Manifesto of Philosophical Practice (1994)

Academic background
- Education: University of Naples Federico II
- Thesis: The enigma of art: Freudian psychoanalytic paths and the poetics of Pier Paolo Pasolini (1990)

Academic work
- Institutions: ABAN Academy of Fine Arts, Nola

Nicola Velotti (born 11 November 1964) is an Italian psychoanalyst, professor, art therapist, and philosophical consultant. His work focuses on the application and development of art therapy and philosophical counseling in Italy, including their use in clinical, educational, and social care settings.

== Early life and education ==
Velotti was born in Casamarciano, Italy.

In 1990 he graduated in Philosophy - psycho-pedagogical address - at the University of Naples Federico II with a thesis in Differential Psychology entitled: The enigma of art: Freudian psychoanalytic paths and the poetics of Pier Paolo Pasolini.

In 1994 he specialized in Analytical Psychotherapy and AutogenicTraining at the Institute of Scientific Research A.R.P.A.D. (Psychology Research Association Applied and Dynamic) in Rome and in Art Therapy at the C.I.S.A.T. (Italian Center Art Therapy Studies) of Naples.

== Career ==
In 1991 Velotti published the Italian Manifesto of Art Therapy with the publishing house Flaccovio Editore, with the collaboration of artists including painter and sculptor Camillo Capolongo. In the following years, he proposed and conducted art therapy workshops with the collaboration of the artist Claudio Costa and the psychiatrist Antonio Slavich in the former Psychiatrico Hospital of the Quarto Costa in Genoa. In the former Psychiatric Hospital of Aversa with the collaboration of the psychiatrist Sergio Piro he has re-proposed and conducted art therapy workshops.

In 1994, after having participated in the first International Conference on Philosophical Consultancy in Vancouver organized by Ran Lahav and Lou Marinoff, he published the Italian Manifesto of Philosophical Practice at the Flaccovio publishing house, supported by philosophers such as Gerardo Marotta founder of the Italian Institute of Studies Philosophical. In the following years he followed the courses held by Gerd Achenbach at the University of Cologne, the founder of philosophical counseling. He contributed with his initiatives to the spread of art therapy and philosophical counseling in nursing homes for the elderly, in centers for minors at risk and in facilities for the disabled.

In 1999, he became a professional art therapist for the American Art Therapy Association and attended courses taught by Edith Kramer of New York University. In 2000 he founded the "Philosophic Therapy Center" association and started a first training course in philosophical counseling and art therapy. He teaches Principles and Techniques of Artistic Therapy and History of Cinematography and Audiovisual at the ABAN Academy of Fine Arts in Nola (Italy). He is a member of the scientific committee of the Association des Psychanalystes Européens (EPA) and has collaborated with several scientific journals.

== Research work ==
His research is fundamentally concerned with the practical application of art and philosophy which must help promote the state of psycho-physical well-being, help overcome stereotypes and prejudices, promote the recovery of the ability to interact positively with others and with the environment, make others appreciate the diversity and accept their own.

== Publications ==
- Il Manifesto Italiano dell’Arteterapia, Flaccovio Editore, Palerme, (1991)
- Il Manifesto Italiano della Pratica Filosofica, Flaccovio Editore, (1994)
- Nicola Velotti 2018 L’ arte secondo la psicoanalisi: le basi teoriche dell’arteterapia ISBN 1792053606
- Nicola Velotti 2019 Pier Paolo Pasolini: l’ arte poetica e filmica come terapia ISBN 1798645432
- Velotti, Nicola (2021). Il Manifesto Italiano dell'Arteterapia Riedizione. Youcanprint. ISBN 9791220340403
- Velotti, Nicola (2025). Il Manifesto Italiano della Pratica Filosofica Riedizione. Youcanprint. ISBN 9791222791791
