= Joseph Bracken =

Joseph Bracken may refer to:

- Joseph A. Bracken (1930–2024), American philosopher and Catholic theologian
- Joseph Kevin Bracken (1852–1904), Irish local politician, Fenian and founder of the Gaelic Athletic Association
