= W. H. Sheldon =

W. H. Sheldon may refer to:

- William Herbert Sheldon (1898–1977), American psychologist
- Wilmon Henry Sheldon (1875–1981), American philosopher
