= Lou Marinoff =

Canadian-born academic and author

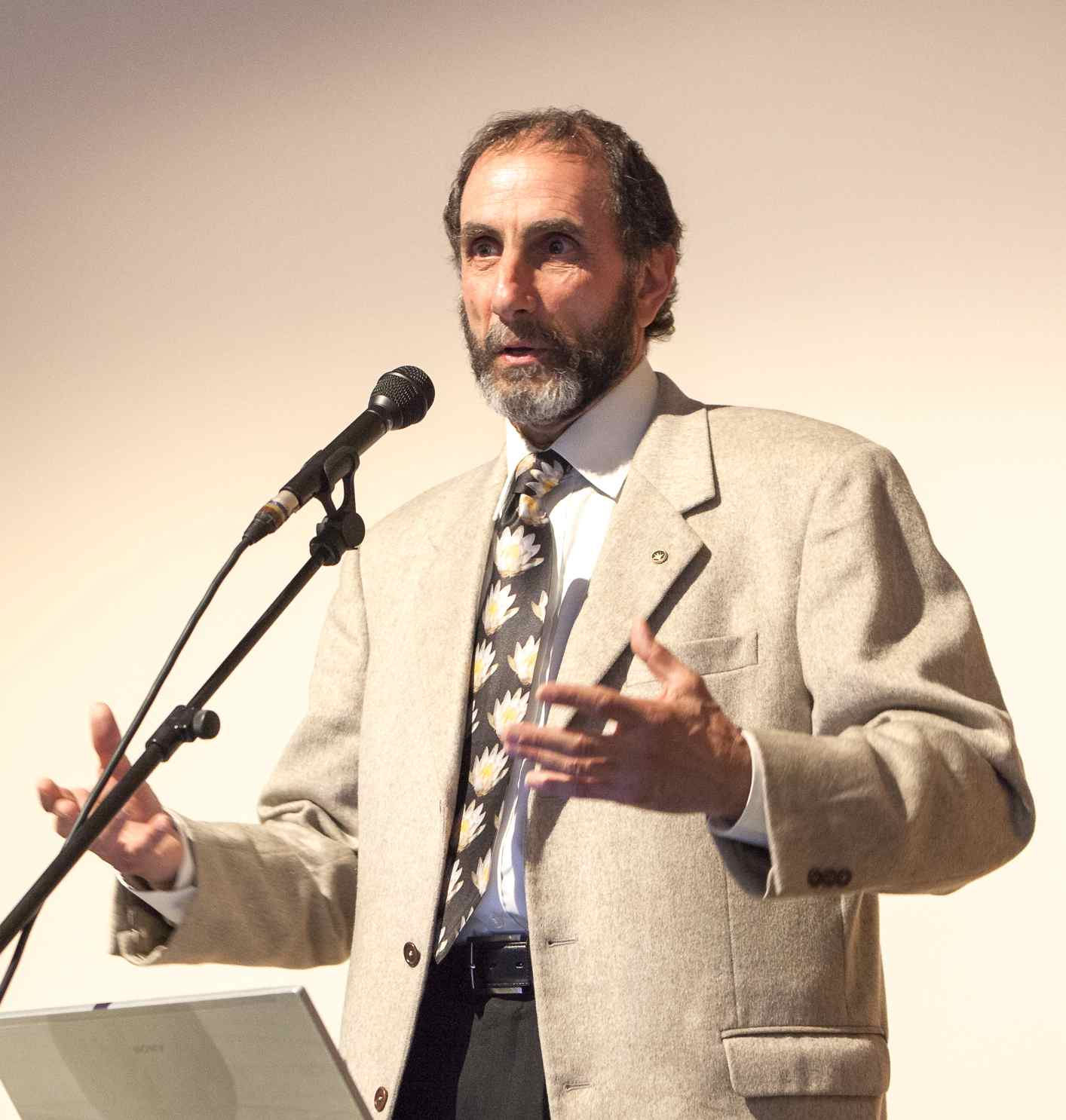
- Lou Marinoff at Taplow Court, the Soka Gakkai International headquarters in the UK
- Born: October 18, 1951 (age 75); Quebec, Canada

Academic background
- Education: Concordia University; McGill University; University College London

Academic work
- School or tradition: Philosophy
- Institutions: City College of New York
- Main interests: Asian Philosophy · Philosophical counseling · Philosophy of Science
- Notable works: Plato Not Prozac, Therapy for the Sane, The Middle Way and The Power of Dao

Lou Marinoff is a Canadian-born academic, author, and Commonwealth Scholar. He is Professor of Philosophy and Asian Studies at The City College of New York and founding President of the American Philosophical Practitioners Association. He is known for his books, including Plato Not Prozac, Therapy for the Sane, The Middle Way and The Power of Dao, which focus on applying philosophical concepts to address everyday challenges.

== Biography ==
He was born on October 18, 1951 in Quebec. Marinoff studied theoretical physics at Concordia University and McGill University before earning a doctorate in philosophy of science at University College London. The title of his thesis, published in 1992, was Strategic interaction in the Prisoner's Dilemma: A game-theoretic dimension of conflict research. He then went to the Hebrew University of Jerusalem for post-doctoral work followed by a lectureship at the University of British Columbia.

== Career ==
In 1994, he joined The City College of New York where he currently serves as Professor of Philosophy, and of Asian Studies. He was also President and Executive Director of the former American Society for Philosophy Counseling and Psychotherapy, rebranded as the National Philosophical Counseling Association. With Ran Lahav, he co-founded the International Conference on Philosophical Practice (ICPP) in 1994. He also co-founded the American Philosophical Practitioners Association in 1998, and is the editor of its journal, Philosophical Practice.

Marinoff has also collaborated with institutes and forums such as the Aspen Institute, Biovision, Festival of Thinkers, Horasis, the Institute for Local Government at the University of Arizona, Soka Gakkai International, Strategic Foresight Group, and the World Economic Forum.

At CCNY, Marinoff plays role in curriculum development and public engagement, helping to promote philosophy beyond traditional academic settings. In recognition of his teaching, he received the Provost's Outstanding Teaching Award in 2019. His academic work focuses on conventional philosophical scholarship with interdisciplinary research spanning decision theory, Asian philosophy, and philosophical practice.

In 2019 he was appointed Honorary Visiting Professor in the Department of Philosophy at Nanjing University in China. He has delivered invited lectures and keynote addresses at universities and international conferences across Europe, Asia, Latin America, and the Middle East, contributing to the global development of applied philosophy and philosophical practice.

== Work ==
He is known for advocating for philosophy as an alternative to traditional psychological and psychiatric therapies. Marinoff's approach centers on the belief that many issues arise not from emotional or chemical imbalances, but from philosophical uncertainties. He established the American Philosophical Practitioners Association (A.P.P.A.) to legitimize and certify practitioners in the field. He believes that many modern problems, such as stress, confusion, and moral dilemmas, can be addressed through philosophical reflection rather than medical or psychiatric interventions.

=== Philosophical counseling ===
Since the 1990s, Marinoff has written and lectured on the use of philosophy in addressing everyday problems and personal dilemmas. His work focuses on philosophical counseling, an approach that uses philosophical ideas and methods to help people examine questions concerning ethics, values, identity, meaning and purpose.

He has also worked to establish philosophical practice as a professional field through organizations, conferences and training programs. His books and public lectures have introduced philosophical counseling to audiences beyond universities. Marinoff has maintained that some personal difficulties have philosophical as well as psychological aspects, and that philosophical inquiry can complement, rather than replace, psychotherapy.

=== Philosophical approach ===
Marinoff's work draws on both Western and Asian philosophical traditions, including Daoism, Confucianism and Buddhism. He frequently refers to philosophers such as Plato, Aristotle, Epictetus, Marcus Aurelius, Confucius, Laozi and I Ching.

He presents philosophy as a practical means of examining personal decisions, resolving conflicts and addressing ethical questions. His approach emphasizes critical reasoning, self-examination and the application of philosophical ideas to everyday situations rather than clinical diagnosis or psychiatric treatment. His later writings have increasingly addressed comparative philosophy and the relationship between Eastern and Western thought. He has explored how these traditions can inform contemporary discussions of leadership, education, diplomacy and international relations.

== Research ==
Marinoff's research spans applied philosophy, decision theory, comparative philosophy, ethics, political philosophy, philosophy of science, and philosophical practice. While his early academic work focused on formal philosophy and rational decision-making, his later scholarship increasingly examined the practical application of philosophy to contemporary social and personal issues.

A recurring theme throughout his research is the relationship between rationality, values, and human decision-making. He has explored how classical philosophical traditions can inform modern debates concerning ethics, public policy, economics, leadership, and conflict resolution. His scholarship frequently examines the limits of conventional models of rational choice, arguing that philosophical reasoning should incorporate ethical judgment, cultural perspectives, and broader conceptions of human flourishing, lately in the context of emergent AI.

Marinoff has also contributed to comparative philosophy by examining intellectual exchanges between Western philosophical traditions and Asian philosophical thought. His work on Daoism, Confucianism, and classical Greek philosophy seeks to identify shared philosophical principles relevant to globalization, and intercultural dialogue.

== Publications ==
=== Books ===
Marinoff is the author of numerous books on philosophy, philosophical counseling, comparative philosophy, ethics, and decision-making.

His known publications include Plato, Not Prozac!, The Middle Way, The Big Questions, Therapy for the Sane, and The Power of Dao.

His most recent scholarly book Paradoxes of Rationality, Probability and Utility: Slaying Decision Theory's Dragons (2026), examines paradoxes in probability theory, utility theory, and rational decision-making. His scholarly books include Essays on Philosophy, Praxis and Culture (2022), On Human Conflict (2019) and Philosophical Practice (2001). He has spoken extensively on practical philosophy, ethics, global governance, leadership, intercultural dialogue, and contemporary social issues, including the effects of AI on human identity. In 2024 he appeared in the Chinese television documentary Walk the Way, produced to mark the publication of the Chinese edition of The Power of Dao. The documentary explored his engagement with Chinese philosophy and the reception of his work in China. Marinoff has also participated in interviews with media organizations including Strategic Foresight Group, Anthem Press, Daily Nous, Huff post, Cranfield School of Management, and the Times Literary Supplement, discussing philosophy, education, international relations, and decision-making.

The New York Times called him “the world’s greatest exponent of philosophical counseling” These appearances have reflected his continuing role in promoting philosophy as a public and interdisciplinary discipline.

== Table Hockey ==
Marinoff is a three -time Canadian Open Table Hockey champion (1978, 79, 80) and US Open Champion (2015).

== Films ==
- 2024. Walk the Way, made for Chinese television, on the launch of the Chinese edition of The Power of Dao in Fuzhou.
- 2023: The Fantastic Factory of Sanity, directed by Lucas Araújo, produced by Brasil Paralelo.
- 2010: Changing Our Minds, Living Life Films, San Diego. Directed by David Sousa.
- 2006: Way of the Puck, Creative Ape Productions, Los Angeles. Directed by Eric Anderson.
- 2004: Table Hockey: The Movie, Triad Films, Nova Scotia. Produced by Peter d'Entrement, directed by Thor Henrikson.

== Books ==
- Marinoff, Lou (2026). Paradoxes of Rationality, Probability and Utility: Slaying Decision Theory’s Dragons. Anthem Press. ISBN 978-1839998690
- Marinoff, Lou (2024). Fernando: Beethoven of the Guitar: Books I, II & III Complete. Waterside Productions. ISBN 978-1962984478.
- Marinoff, Lou (2022). Essays on philosophy, praxis and culture: an eclectic, provocative and prescient collection. London, New York: Anthem Press. ISBN 978-1-83998-058-9.
- Marinoff, Lou (2021). Fernando: Beethoven of the Guitar: Book I: Youth, Celebrity, and War. Waterside Productions. ISBN 978-1954968066.
- Marinoff, Lou (2021). Fernando: Beethoven of the Guitar: Book II: Exile, Favor, & Triumph. San Diego: Waterside Productions. p. 263. ISBN 978-1954968066.
- Marinoff, Lou (2021). Fernando: Beethoven of the Guitar: Book III: Glory, Finale, & Legacy. San Diego, CA.: Waterside Productions. p. 292. ISBN 978-1954968639.
- Marinoff, Lou (2020). The middle way: finding happiness in a world of extremes (2nd ed.). Cardiff, CA: Waterside Productions. ISBN 978-1949001815. OCLC 148732469.
- Marinoff, Lou (2020). Therapy for the Sane: How Philosophy Can Change Your Life. Waterside Productions. p. 435. ISBN 978-1949003871.
- Marinoff, Lou (2019). Fair New World: A Savage Satire of Political Correctness and Radical Feminism (2nd ed.). Cardiff, CA: Waterside Productions Inc. ISBN 978-1943625581.
- Marinoff, Lou (2019). On human conflict: the philosophical foundations of war and peace. Lanham, Maryland: Hamilton Books. ISBN 978-0-7618-7105-7. OCLC 1064754617.
- Tafler, Lou (Lou Marinoff's pen name) (2018). Eloquent Sinking: A Gaspesian Tragicomedy. Waterside Productions. ISBN 978-1947637511.
- Marinoff, Lou (2017). The Power of Dao: A Timeless Guide to Happiness and Harmony. Waterside Productions. ISBN 978-1945390241
- Marinoff, Lou, and Daisaku Ikeda (2012). The Inner Philosopher: Conversations on Philosophy's Transformative Power. Dialogue Path Press. ISBN 978-1887917094.
- Marinoff, Lou (2001). Philosophical Practice. Elsevier. ISBN 978-0080513768.
- Marinoff, Lou (1999). Plato Not Prozac!. HarperCollins. ISBN 978-0060193287.

== See also ==
- Philosophical practice
- Gerd B. Achenbach
