= Logic-based therapy =

Type of philosophical counseling

Logic-based therapy (LBT) is a modality of philosophical counseling developed by philosopher Elliot D. Cohen beginning in the mid-1980s. It is a philosophical variant of rational emotive behavior therapy (REBT), which was developed by psychologist Albert Ellis. A randomized, controlled efficacy study of LBT suggests that it may be effective in reducing anxiety.

== Comparison to REBT ==
According to the theory of LBT, people decide to make themselves upset emotionally and behaviorally by deducing self-defeating emotional and behavioral conclusions from irrational premises. LBT retains the theoretical base of the cognitive-behavioral psychotherapies, insofar as it contends emotional and behavioral problems to be rooted in malignant and maladaptive thought processes and patterns. LBT considers itself not only a type of philosophical counseling, but a form of cognitive-behavioral therapy. At the same time, LBT remains firmly planted in philosophy by way of the use of formal logic, informal logic, phenomenological intentionality, and philosophical antidotes in conceptualizing and treating mental disorders and psychosocial difficulties.

According to classical REBT, there are three psychological points:

- Point A (Activating event)
- Point B (Belief system)
- Point C (behavioral and emotional Consequence)

Ellis argued that the Activating event itself (A) does not cause people to be upset (C); they require also a set of Beliefs that, in conjunction with the event, can contribute to a self-defeating behavioral and emotional Consequence. For example, it is not only the divorce (A) that causes depression (C), but also the belief that this event is awful and the worst thing that could have happened (B). Thus, according to Ellis, by finding the particular Activating event and Belief, one can find out what is causing one's depression (C). Clients can then work on changing their Belief system and their behavior to overcome the depression (C).

LBT recasts REBT's A-B-C model of psychological disturbance into syllogistic logic. According to its logic-based approach, the causal model Ellis advanced is not accurate. The depression is not caused by events that occur inside (Point B) and outside (Point A) one's subjective world. Instead, one becomes depressed by deducing a conclusion from a set of premises.

For example, one may become depressed by setting up this syllogism:

1. If I was divorced, then what happened to me is so terrible that I might as well be dead.
2. I was divorced.
3. So, what happened to me is so terrible that I might as well be dead.

=== Practical syllogistic ratings ===
A syllogism is a deductive form of reasoning having two premises and a conclusion. The idea that the reasoning behind our emotions and behavior can be so ordered in terms of a syllogism was in fact an insight of Aristotle, who called this kind of syllogism a "practical syllogism." The distinction is that the conclusion evaluates or rates the thing in question instead of merely describing it. For example, in concluding that something is terrible, a person is negatively rating it, and therefore will act or tend to act and feel negatively toward it. In fact, Aristotle went so far as to claim that the conclusion of a practical syllogism was always an action.

According to LBT, by syllogizing one's behavioral and emotional reasoning in terms of the practical syllogism, one is in a better position to find one's irrational premises, refute them, and replace the unsound reasoning with sound "antidotal" reasoning. For example, the first premise in the above syllogism is irrational because one is exaggerating just how bad the divorce is (thinking of it as though it were on the level of a catastrophic disease or natural disaster).

LBT also accepts the phenomenological thesis that every mental state, including emotions, has a so-called "intentional object" or "object of the mind." That is, there is always an object to which a mental state refers or is about. Thus, if one is depressed, then one is depressed about something. This intentional object is represented in the descriptive minor premise of the emotional reasoning, for example, the premise "I was divorced" in the aforementioned syllogism. In addition, the syllogisms comprising emotional reasoning always rate the emotional object or some aspect of it. For example, in the aforementioned syllogism, one rates one's divorce as being "terrible". This rating element is represented in the consequent (then clause) of the major premise of the syllogism, as in the premise "If I was divorced, then what happened to me is so terrible that I might as well be dead."

Accordingly, the syllogism comprising one's emotional reasoning can be constructed by first finding the intentional object (O) of one's emotion; and second, by finding the rating (R) of the emotion. As such, the valid, hypothetical structure of a syllogism comprising one's emotional reasoning can be symbolized as follows:

1. If O then R
2. O
3. Therefore R

Further, according to LBT, all emotions can be uniquely identified by their intentional object (O) and rating (R) elements. For example, the intentional object of anger is always an action; and the rating is a strong negative evaluation of the action itself or the agent of the action. In depression, the intentional object is an event or state of affairs; and the rating is a strong negative evaluation on the basis of which one strongly negatively rates one's own existence. Thus, one may rate one's divorce as terrible, on the basis of which one gives one's own existence a strong negative evaluation.

=== Higher order premises ===
LBT permits clients to trace their inferences to higher order premises that might be at the root of an emotional and behavioral disturbance. For example, by questioning why having been divorced is so bad, another higher level syllogism can be uncovered:

1. If I was divorced, then that makes me a worthless loser.
2. If that makes me a worthless loser then what happened to me is so terrible that I might as well be dead.
3. So, if I was divorced, what happened to me is so terrible that I might as well be dead.

Even higher order premises at the root of the behavioral and emotional disturbance can be uncovered, for example, by asking why being divorced makes one a worthless loser. For example, this higher order syllogism might be uncovered:

1. I must always be perfect and never fail at anything.
2. If I must always be perfect and never fail at anything, then if I was divorced, that makes me a worthless loser.
3. So, if I was a divorced then that makes me a worthless loser.

In this way, the depression can be traced back to a demand for perfection from which a person is deducing their own worthlessness, from which they are in turn deducing the horribleness of what happened.

== Comparison to psychotherapy ==
While LBT is a form of philosophical counseling, since it addresses client's emotional problems and provides systematic ways of resolving them, it can also be considered a form of psychotherapy. More specifically, because of its focus on the client's cognitions and behaviors in relation to emotional functioning and relationship with REBT, it is also a type of cognitive behavior therapy (CBT). However, LBT differentiates itself from some other forms of CBT by emphasizing how premises about emotions are deduced and inferred from experiences in the world: LBT suggests that all emotional responses have a logical structure to them. The fact that emotions contain logical structures which can be subject to investigation and revision was also supported in the philosopher Robert C. Solomon's cognitivist theory of emotions.

LBT further differs from other forms of psychotherapy. For example, psychoanalytic or psychodynamic traditions will look for the underlying causes of emotional problems. These approaches will explore the client's early relationships with significant others (e.g., parental figures) and their effect on current relationships and resultant emotional and behavioral disturbances. Interpretation is utilized to provide the client with insights into their psychic organization. In contrast (but like other types of CBT), LBT does not place any particular emphasis on past relationships or the causes of problems and is even less concerned with interpretation. Instead, LBT remains philosophical insofar as it examines reasoning and logical structures created by client. The emphasis is not on the "why" of a problem, but on the "how"; that is, how the person deduces their emotional position and ways in which to alter it for more adaptive thinking and functioning.

=== LBT's positive psychology ===
In contrast to classical REBT, LBT identifies positive virtues that can guide a person in overcoming irrational beliefs. According to LBT, all basic irrational beliefs ("cardinal fallacies") identified by REBT theorists and philosophers are related to "transcendent virtues" that can overcome them. LBT thereby includes a "positive psychology" in addition to the classical REBT emphasis on refuting irrational beliefs.

As a philosophical counseling approach, LBT also applies philosophical antidotes derived from the philosophies of antiquity to help clients strive toward their transcendent virtues. For example, the Kantian categorical imperative that says to "treat oneself and others as ends in themselves and not as mere means" can be used as an antidote to damnation of self or others, and thus as a sort of recipe to attaining the transcendent virtue of respect for self and others. Similarly, Friedrich Nietzsche's theory about human suffering, which says that suffering can make one stronger and nobler, can be used as an antidote to catastrophic thinking ("Awfulizing") about personal loss, thereby building courage in confronting the loss and using it to create new positive meanings and values in one's existence.

The following chart displays each such irrational belief and its respective trumping virtue:

Cardinal fallacy	Transcendent virtue
Demanding perfection	Metaphysical security (security about reality)
Awfulizing	Courage (in face of evil)
Damnation (of self, others, and the universe)	Respect (for self, others, and the universe)
Jumping on the bandwagon	Authenticity (self-determination)
Can'tstipation	Temperance (self-control)
Dutiful worrying	Moral creativity (in confronting and resolving problems)
Manipulation	Empowerment of others
The world revolves around me	Empathy (connecting with others)
Oversimplifying reality	Good judgment (in making objective, unbiased discernments in practical affairs)
Distorting probabilities	Foresightedness (in assessing probabilities)
Blind conjecture	Scientificity (in providing explanations)

=== Cultivation of willpower ===
LBT also emphasizes willpower in changing and redirecting beliefs and actions. While it makes no commitment to the existence of free will in any metaphysical sense, it recognizes the practical value of building "willpower muscle" as a means to overcome cognitive dissonance and attain one's transcendent virtues. LBT emphasizes and promotes the power that one has to change the way in which an event or situation is interpreted by altering one's thought patterns.

LBT's emphasis on the "willpower muscle" suggests the ability of agency and choice in regard to therapeutic change. Based upon the rejection of a deterministic causative framework in favor of a nondeterministic perspective, LBT maintains compatibility with existentialism and existential psychotherapy. This position of choice is central to existentialist philosopher Jean-Paul Sartre's thinking on human freedom and responsibility, which is one of existential psychotherapist Irvin Yalom's "existential givens". Here, clients are encouraged to confront their inherent freedom by way of choosing how to interpret situations. As philosopher Martin Heidegger and others have suggested, clients can become a "master over moods" by taking responsibility for their moods and emotions and subsequently revising them. Furthermore, this can lead to different ways of thinking about and experiencing the world with the accompanied creation of new meanings in life.

=== Role of emotion ===
LBT emphasizes the client's use of deductive logic in their emotional reasoning, which places focus on the cognitive aspect of emotion. However, it holds that the client's emotional reasoning "tracks the flow of associated images, interoceptive feelings, and other bodily sensations generated by cortical, somatosensory, and limbic structures". Further, LBT contends that it is the entire experience that contributes to the person's emotional reasoning. This includes the experienced event, any thoughts or beliefs related to the event as well as physiological reactions. Although an activating event, such as a divorce or loss of a job, objectively is not on the same level as a catastrophic event, rushing to the conclusion that it is irrational for the client to think that way is potentially invalidating the intensity of the client's subjective emotional experience. Empathic understanding and the building of therapeutic rapport is an important component to all psychotherapies and counseling methods and is no less important in LBT.

== Criticisms and limitations ==
With a LBT counselor's knowledge of deductive logic, a power differential may be created between the counselor and the client. This could result in the client seeking the "correct" way of deducing premises and develop an overreliance on the LBT counselor. However, the goal is to create more flexible and open ways of interpreting the world and extinguish "absolutist" thinking or unrealistic expectations as a result of a collaborative therapeutic relationship. However, understanding and changing one's inferences and logical structures requires a certain level of intellectual ability, and consequently, may limit the application.

While LBT may be conceptually sound and have firm theoretical roots, much of psychotherapy and counseling research emphasizes the importance of evidence-based practice, that is, interventions and therapeutic approaches that have scientific evidence for their efficacy. Given this, to establish LBT's efficacy and effectiveness, further empirical validation must occur through psychotherapy research methodology.

== See also ==
- Argumentation theory
- Critical thinking
- Dysrationalia
- Epistemic virtue
- Intellectual virtue
- List of cognitive biases
- List of fallacies
- List of maladaptive schemas
- List of memory biases
- Motivated reasoning
- Socratic questioning § Psychology
