= Michel Weber =

Belgian philosopher (born 1963)

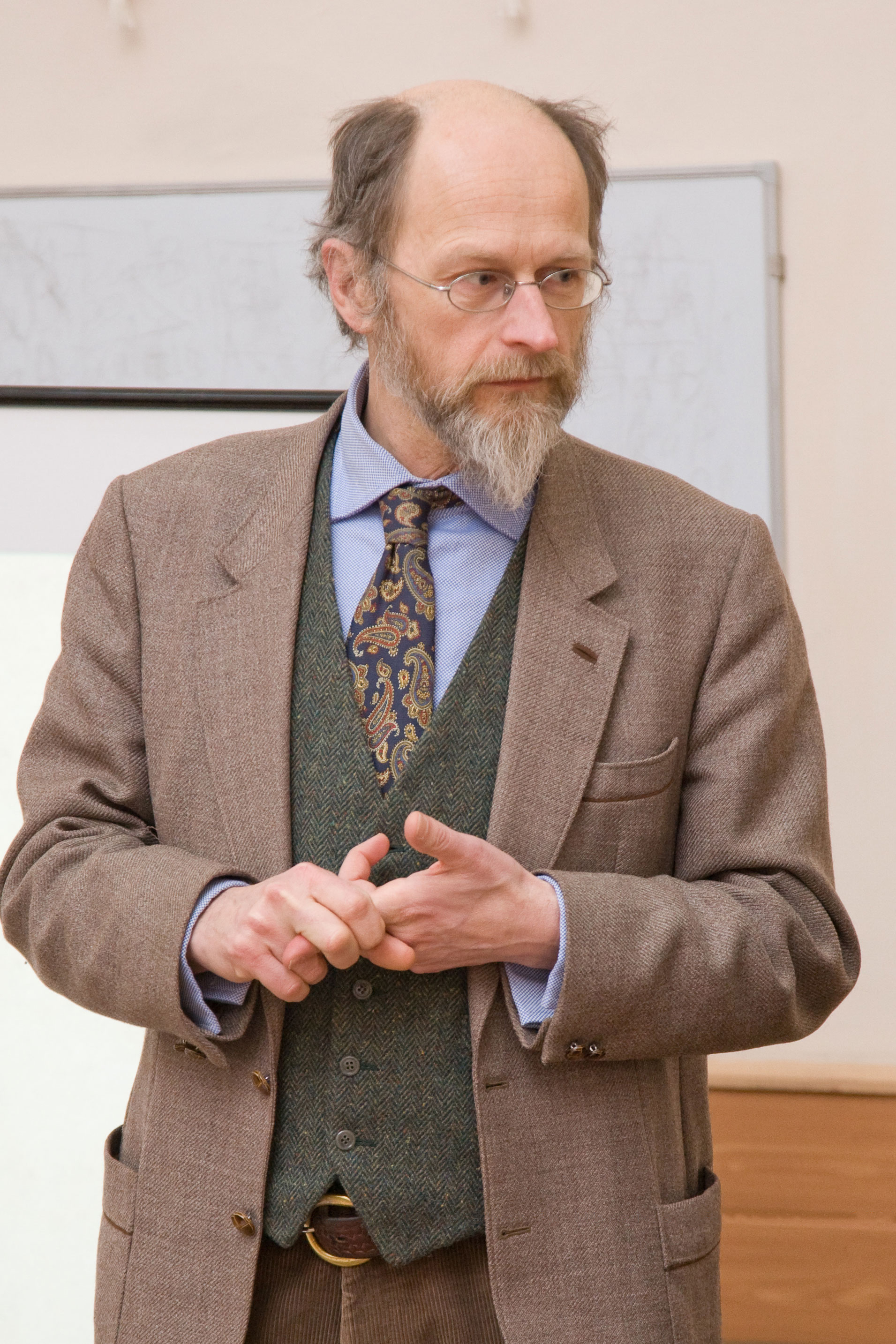
- Weber in 2013
- Born: 1963 (age 62–63); Brussels, Belgium
- Occupation: Philosopher

Education
- Education: UCLouvain

Michel Weber (born 1963) is a Belgian philosopher. He is best known as an interpreter and advocate of the philosophy of Alfred North Whitehead, and has come to prominence as the architect and organizer of an overlapping array of international scholarly societies and publication projects devoted to Whitehead and the global relevance of process philosophy.

Weber criticizes contemporary academic philosophy for losing touch with its early Greek roots. Philosophy has a practical mission (rooted in Socratic discourse) to restore personal and social well-being, but it cannot do this, he argues, if it renounces its traditional metaphysical obligation (rooted in pre-Socratic speculation) to understand the cosmos. Weber believes that process philosophy is uniquely qualified to fulfill this double function in the post-modern world.

Weber was educated in Belgium and the United States. The primary languages of his publications are English and French.

== Education ==
Michel Weber studied applied economics at the Saint-Louis University, Brussels (candidat ingénieur commercial, 1986) and philosophy at the University of Louvain (UCLouvain) in Louvain-la-Neuve (licencié en philosophie, 1991; docteur en philosophie, 1997). His master's thesis, written under the supervision of Jean Ladrière, dealt with the epistemological status of the "anthropic principle" in cosmology in light of the concepts of teleology (or "finality") found in Aristotle, Thomas Aquinas, and Kant.

From 1993 to 1995, he was Visiting Scholar at the Center for Process Studies of the Claremont School of Theology and at Claremont Graduate University, Claremont, California (U.S.), where he worked under the supervision of John B. Cobb Jr. and David Ray Griffin.

In 1997, he defended his doctoral thesis, Intuition pré-systématique et intuition ontologique chez Alfred North Whitehead. Euristique du pancréativisme de l'époque de Harvard (Pre-systematic Intuition and Ontological Intuition According to Alfred North Whitehead: The Heuristics of Pan-creativism in the Harvard Era), written under the supervision of Marcel Crabbé.

== Career ==
From 1997 to 2002 he was Research Fellow at the Centre de Logique de l'Institut supérieur de Philosophie of the UCLouvain. From 2001 to 2002 he taught philosophy at the École européenne Bruxellensis II (European Baccalaureate, Anglophone Section, 6th and 7th years). From 2002 to 2007, he was Research Fellow at the Centre for Philosophical Anthropology of the UCLouvain Higher Institute of Philosophy.

In 2000, Weber created, with the support of François Beets and Paul Gochet (University of Liège), the Chromatiques whiteheadiennes and the Whitehead Psychology Nexus, two scholarly societies intended to federate research on different aspects, nuances, and implications of the thought of A. N. Whitehead. In 2001, he created the European William James Project with Jack Barbalet (University of Leicester), Jaime Nubiola (University of Navarra) and the late Timothy L. S. Sprigge (Emeritus Edinburgh).

In 2002, he created the research seminars "Chromatiques whiteheadiennes" with the cooperation of the "Philosophies of Experience" research center at the Université de Nantes Department of Philosophy and the Center for the Study of Pragmatism and Analytic Philosophy at the Sorbonne (le Centre d'Études sur le Pragmatisme et la Philosophie Analytique or CEPPA, but renamed since as EXeCO; Université Paris 1 Panthéon Sorbonne-École Doctorale).

Since 2004, he has been the Editorial Director of the series Chromatiques whiteheadiennes for the academic publisher Ontos Verlag (Frankfurt) and Editorial Co-director, along with Nicholas Rescher (Pittsburgh) and Johanna Seibt (Aarhus & Konstanz), of the Process Thought series, also with Ontos Verlag (Advisory Board: Mark Bickhard, Lehigh; Jaime Nubiola, Navarra; and Roberto Poli, Trento).

Since 2005, he has co-edited the Chromatikon: Annuaire de la philosophie en procès — Yearbook of Philosophy in Process at the Presses universitaires de Louvain, first with Diane d'Eprémesnil (UCLouvain), then with Pierfrancesco Basile (University of Bern), and now with Ronny Desmet (Vrije Universiteit Brussel).

In 2006, he created the Chromatiques whiteheadiennes "Centre for Philosophical Practice," a non-profit organization. The center now federates the three networks mentioned above (the Chromatiques whiteheadiennes, the Whitehead Psychology Nexus, and the European William James Project) and provides an institutional base for two new activities: first, the publication of a scholarly book series appearing under the label Les Éditions Chromatika (Chromatika Editions) and, second, the opening in Brussels of Belgium's first philosophical counseling service or "philosophical praxis."

Since 2007, he has been a member of the "Contemporary Ontological Visions" network of the Institute for Philosophical Research of the Bulgarian Academy of Sciences. In 2008–9, he was Visiting Professor at the New Bulgarian University, Department of Cognitive Science and Psychology & Department of Philosophy and Sociology.

Since 2009, Weber is also a trained hypnotherapist (Institut Milton Erickson, Brussels).

== Philosophical work ==
As a principal source of inspiration, Weber promotes the ideas of a group of loosely associated thinkers from the early 20th century who applied evolutionary thinking to psychology, epistemology, cosmology, metaphysics, and theology, giving rise to the school of thought now known as "process philosophy." Alfred North Whitehead (1861–1947), along with C. S. Peirce (1839–1914), Henri Bergson (1859–1941), and William James (1842–1910), is regarded as one of the fathers of process philosophy. This mostly Anglo-American school of thought still finds only minority endorsement in academic philosophy departments. Nevertheless, despite its limited reception in the United States and Great Britain, process philosophy has begun to interest a small but growing number of scholars worldwide. By organizing a global network of like-minded scholars and fostering the publication of their ideas in Europe, Weber has contributed significantly to the visibility of process philosophy in that continent.

There also appears to be a shift of focus. Until recently, interest in Whitehead, especially in the United States, tended to focus on process theology. Whitehead's brief but provocative theological speculations, added almost as an afterthought at the end of his major philosophical opus Process and Reality (1929), were elaborated into an excitingly new natural theology that seemed particularly attractive to Christian theologians because it made naturalistic sense of God's personal love for creatures. This theological emphasis, however, along with a sometimes evangelical tone adopted by Whitehead's more ardent devotees, may be the reason for the marginalization of process philosophy in mainstream academic philosophy.

With his 1996 book Process Metaphysics, the eminent and prolific American philosopher Nicholas Rescher began a campaign to rehabilitate a broadly secular style of process thinking. He defended it as the optimal matrix for any systematic theorizing about the nature of things. Like Rescher in the United States, Weber cultivates a critical and largely secular appreciation for process philosophy. He translated Rescher's Process Metaphysics into French in 2006.

In 2000, his monograph La dialectique de l'intuition chez A. N. Whitehead. Sensation pure, pancréativité et onto-logisme (The Dialectic of Intuition in the Philosophy of Alfred North Whitehead: Pure Sensation, Pancreativity, and Onto-logism) was awarded a prize by the Belgian Royal Academy (Classe des Lettres de l'Académie Royale de Belgique). Weber argues that the term pancreativism constitutes the more appropriate qualification of Whitehead's metaphysics, which is neither a pantheism or a panentheism.

== Professional activities ==
Weber is the author of 10 monographs and 80 scholarly articles and encyclopedia entries. His monograph La Dialectique de l'intuition chez A. N. Whitehead: sensation pure, pancréativité et contiguïsme (The Dialectic of Intuition in the Philosophy of Alfred North Whitehead: Pure Sensation, Pancreativity, and Onto-logism) was awarded the Prix du Concours annuel 2000 by the Royal Academy of Belgium.

He is also the motive force behind numerous international and intercultural collaborations. He strives to coordinate his professional activities toward the creation of a new, visionary philosophical culture conceived as cooperative, intellectually adventurous, ethically self-aware, and global in reach.

- He has founded three international scholarly societies:

- Chromatiques whiteheadiennes,
- the Whitehead Psychology Nexus, and
- the European William James Project.

- He manages a non-profit publishing house,

- Éditions Chromatika.

- And, he oversees (in conjunction with various colleagues) the publication of four book series

- the Chromatiques whiteheadiennes,
- the Ontos Verlag Series in Process Thought,
- the Whitehead Psychology Nexus Studies, and
- the Chromatika editions,

as well as a philosophical annual,

- Chromatikon: Annuaire de la philosophie en procès — Yearbook of Philosophy in Process.

Using process philosophy as a matrix to foster synergies, Weber follows the work of hundreds of scholars worldwide and with each of his projects defines a locus where he thinks creative energies are poised to intersect. Collaborating with some 150 scholars representing all continents, he has to date edited or co-edited 30 collections, bringing together hundreds of original papers on themes relating to process philosophy in an interdisciplinary and multicultural context.

- Most ambitious in scope is the two-volume Handbook of Whiteheadian Process Thought, edited by Weber and Will Desmond: "Gathering 115 entries written by 101 internationally renowned experts in their fields, the Handbook of Whiteheadian Process Thought aims at interpreting Whitehead secundum Whitehead, at canvassing the current state of knowledge in Whiteheadian scholarship and at identifying promising directions for future investigations through (internal) cross-elucidation and (external) interdisciplinary and crossdisciplinary development."

- Also noteworthy is the recent interdisciplinary volume edited by Weber and Anderson Weekes, Process Approaches to Consciousness in Psychology, Neuroscience, and Philosophy of Mind, which "opens a dialogue between process philosophy and [the burgeoning field of] contemporary consciousness studies." It is too early to judge how this book will be received by those who approach the study of consciousness from more mainstream backgrounds in Anglo-American Analytic philosophy or in Continental Phenomenology and Existentialism, but the contributors to this volume make a point of establishing what they believe to be fertile common ground between process thought and both its mainstream rivals.

Weber is also the founder of the Centre for Philosophical Practice in Brussels. Philosophical Counseling is a recent movement, probably begun in the United States, employing Socratic methods of dialog for the purpose of short-term counseling that, without seeking to replace more traditional psychotherapies, nevertheless offers an alternative to them.

In July 2010, he organized an Applied Process Metaphysics Summer Institute in Paris, at the Cité universitaire's Fondation Biermans Lapôtre. The second Institute has taken place in July 2011.

In May 2014, the philosophical counselling service moved to the Centre Kinos, now Tonaki, of the University of Louvain (UCLouvain) in Louvain-la-Neuve. Dr Weber is also currently Adjunct Professor, Department of Educational Foundations, University of Saskatchewan.

== Bibliography (selection) ==
Authored monographs

1. La Dialectique de l’intuition chez A. N. Whitehead: sensation pure, pancréativité et contiguïsme. Préface de Jean Ladrière. Mémoire couronné par la Classe des Lettres et des Sciences morales et politiques de l’Académie Royale de Belgique, Frankfurt / Paris, Ontos Verlag, 2005 (ISBN 3-937202-55-2).
2. Whitehead’s Pancreativism. The Basics. Foreword by Nicholas Rescher, Frankfurt / Paris, Ontos Verlag, 2006 (ISBN 3-938793-15-5).
3. L’Épreuve de la philosophie. Essai sur les fondements de la praxis philosophique, Louvain-la-Neuve, Éditions Chromatika, 2008 (ISBN 978-2-930517-02-5).
4. Éduquer (à) l’anarchie. Essai sur les conséquences de la praxis philosophique, Louvain-la-Neuve, Éditions Chromatika, 2008. (ISBN 978-2-930517-03-2).
5. (with Jean-Claude Dumoncel) Whitehead ou Le Cosmos torrentiel. Introductions à Procès et réalité, Louvain-la-Neuve, Éditions Chromatika, 2010 (ISBN 978-2-930517-05-6).
6. Whitehead's Pancreativism. Jamesian Applications, Frankfurt / Paris, ontos verlag, 2011 (ISBN 978-386838-103-0).
7. Essai sur la gnose de Harvard. Whitehead apocryphe, Louvain-la-Neuve, Les Éditions Chromatika, 2011 (ISBN 978-2-930517-26-1).
8. De quelle révolution avons-nous besoin ?, Paris, Éditions Sang de la Terre, 2013. (ISBN 978-2-86985-297-6)
9. Ethnopsychiatrie et syntonie. Contexte philosophique et applications cliniques, La-Neuville-aux-Joûtes, Jacques Flament Éditions, 2015. (ISBN 978-2-36336-210-0)
10. Petite philosophie de l’Art Royal. Analyse de l’alchimie franc-maçonne, Louvain-la-Neuve, Éditions Chromatika, 2015. (ISBN 978-2-930517-48-3)
11. The Political Vindication of Radical Empiricism. With Application to the Global Systemic Crisis, Claremont, Ca., Process Century Press, 2016. (ISBN 978-1-940447-12-4)
12. Pouvoir, sexe et climat. Biopolitique et création littéraire chez G. R. R. Martin, Avion, Éditions du Cénacle de France, 2017. (ISBN 978-2-916537-22-1)
13. Pythagore juste et parfait. Philosophie ou ésotérisme ?, Louvain-la-Neuve, Éditions Chromatika, 2018.(ISBN 978-2-930517-58-2)
14. Contre le totalitarisme transhumaniste : les enseignements philosophiques du sens commun, Limoges, FYP éditions, 2018. (ISBN 978-2-36405-172-0)
15. (with Laureline Kergueris), Thérapie psychocorporelle et massage ayurvédiques — Théorie et pratique de l’événement, Louvain-la-Neuve, Éditions Chromatika, 2020. (ISBN 978-2-930517-64-3)
16. (with Frédéric Sanssens, Philosopher, guérir et sanctifier. Dialogues sur la voie druidique, Louvain-la-Neuve, Éditions Chromatika, 2020. ISBN 978-2-930517-66-7
17. Covid-19(84) ou La vérité (politique) du mensonge sanitaire : le fascisme numérique, Louvain-la-Neuve, Éditions Chromatika, 2020. (978-2-930517-68-1)
18. Féminisme épidermique et utopie viscérale. Signes, symboles, et archétypes, Louvain-la-Neuve, Éditions Chromatika, 2020. (978-2-930517-72-8)
19. Pouvoir de la décroissance et décroissance du pouvoir. Penser le totalitarisme sanitaire, Louvain-la-Neuve, Éditions Chromatika, 2021 ISBN 978-2-930517-74-2
20. Théorie et pratique du collectivisme oligarchique. Le complot de la Grande Réinitialisation n’aura pas lieu, 2021 ISBN 978-2-930517-80-3
21. Éléments de routine ayurvédique. Autonomie, rituel et ascèse, Les Éditions Chromatika, 2021. ISBN 978-2-930517-82-7
22. Anarchie, gnose et sagesse. Essai typologique, Louvain-la-Neuve, Éditions Chromatika, 2021. ISBN 978-2-930517-84-1
23. The Threefold Root of Temporality. Elements of Whiteheadian Organic Metaphysics, Louvain-la-Neuve, Éditions Chromatika, 2021. ISBN 978-2-930517-76-6
24. La Liberté est la première des sécurités. Plaidoyer psychothérapeutique, Louvain-la-Neuve, Éditions Chromatika, 2021. ISBN 978-2-930517-86-5
25. Le Chant du signe. À propos des vénérables malentendus philosophiques et de l’inévitable transition culturelle, Louvain-la-Neuve, Éditions Chromatika, 2023. ISBN 978-2-930517-90-2
26. Les Fins de l’histoire. Clinique du totalitarisme contemporain, Louvain-la-Neuve, Éditions Chromatika, 2023. ISBN 978-2-930517-92-6
27. Propositions contre-insurrectionnelles. Typologie des devenirs politiques, Louvain-la-Neuve, Éditions Chromatika, 2023. ISBN 978-2-930517-96-4
28. Les Racines de l’enfer. Philosophie crisique, sotériologie, psychologie clinique et ponérologie politique, Louvain-la-Neuve, Éditions Chromatika, 2024. ISBN 978-2-930517-98-8
29. Orwell et Huxley. Le Lion et la licorne en contrepoints totalitaires, Louvain-la-Neuve, Éditions Chromatika, 2024. ISBN 978-2-931279-10-6
