= Philosophy of motion =

Branch of philosophy

Philosophy of motion is a branch of philosophy concerned with exploring questions on the existence and nature of motion. The central questions of this study concern the epistemology and ontology of motion, whether motion exists as we perceive it, what is it, and, if it exists, how does it occur. The philosophy of motion is important in the study of theories of change in natural systems and is closely connected to studies of space and time in philosophy.

The philosophy of motion was of central concern to Ancient Greek and Roman philosophers, particularly the pre-Socratic philosophers such as Parmenides, Zeno of Elea, Heraclitus and Democritus. As such, it was influential in the development of the philosophy of science in general.

== Early history ==
=== Greek physiology ===
The concept of motion is closely related to the idea of change, and it is arguments about what made change possible that led the early Greek philosophers to pioneer naturalistic explanations for phenomena.

Heraclitus (born circa 535 BC) had famously declared that "all things are in motion like a stream".

==== Motion only a perception ====
Parmenides (born circa 475 BC) and his followers held that motion is only perceived but cannot actually exist. He professed that from our human point of view there are two aspects to the study of the universe of which we must be aware, on the one hand how we see it, and on the other how it must really be. Motion is a fact from our point of view, but Parmenides argues that as far as things must really be, it is logically impossible that motion could exist as we perceive it.

Zeno of Elea, a pupil of Parmenides, formulated the Arguments against motion, more commonly referred to as the paradoxes, in order to support his master's theories of the One and of the consequent impossibility of motion at the fundamental level. The rigorous denial of even the possibility of motion forced a more thorough response from philosophers engaged on the same theoretical project.

This school of thought leaned on the notion of infinite continuous matter, space (and time).

==== Atomism and determinism ====
In response to Parmenides definition of motion, Democritus (born circa 460) expounded the atomic theory, in which indivisible bits of matter are in constant motion through the void. In the absence of something to perturb them they fall evenly through space. According to this school of thought matter and or space (and time) are discrete and finite. Evidence for this theory was found by John Dalton in the early 1800s, explaining the finding that chemical decomposition of compounds gives whole numbered ratios of weight, leading to Dalton's atomic theory

Motion conceived in this way led to the approach of determinism and therefore to questioning how free will could exist. In response, Epicurus appears to have included the concept of the clinamen, or atomic swerve. This tiny random motion serves to bring atoms into contact and begin the cascade that leads to the organization of matter as it is perceived by us, introducing an element of uncertainty allowing for the existence of individual choice, an essential concept in Epicure's philosophy.

==== Plato and Aristotle ====
According to Plato (circa 425 BC), motion is a phenomenon that can never be completely comprehended or described. It originates in infinite and continuous "spiritual" self-motion which is synonymous to life and to the soul. This perpetual motion causes "communicated" motion, which is the perceived motion of bodies.

Aristotle (384 BC) claimed that all motion is caused, and can be sensed, but originally was potentially present in the now moving body. Once there is motion, that motion will continue infinitely unless it is stopped.

Aristotle's doctrine was generally adopted by medieval science and lead to Isaac Newton's formulation of the Newton's laws of motion in 1666.

=== Buddhist ===
The philosophy of motion is treated by the Buddhist philosopher Nagarjuna in his treatise the Mūlamadhyamakakārikā or Fundamental verses of the Middle Way, in the 2nd and 3rd century CE.

Further east, in China, the Sanlun school of Mahayana Buddhism developed a sophisticated philosophy of motion under the philosopher Sengzhao. His treatise called The Immutability of Things, deals with motion explicitly.

=== Aztec ===
Aztec metaphysics gave priority to motion over substance in its cosmological ontology. In other words, process was seen to be fundamental and objects or substances as ephemeral. Change therefore was naturally conceived of as motion, and this motion was divided into three forms, out of which all change occurs. These were named olin (bouncing, oscillating) malinalli (spinning, twisting, spiralling) and, the most important, nepantla (weaving, intersecting, joining, balancing).

== Medieval ==
The Five Ways logical arguments by Thomas Aquinas and the proposed Unmoved Mover is an example of the philosophy of motion from the Medieval era.

- Maimonides
- Averroes
- Thomas Aquinas

== Modern ==
Achieving a coherent understanding of motion has been, and continues to be, of importance in understanding the nature of space and time in modern science. The main philosophical debate has been between absolute and relational conceptions of motion.

- Descartes
- Leibniz
- Newton
- Mach
- Einstein
- Chaos theory
- Astronomy

=== Biology ===
Motion in complex systems such as protein folding.

=== Evolution ===
Morphogenesis of animal bodies and change on large and small scales. Niche construction.

=== Quantum physics ===
Questions of the nature of motion continue to arise in modern physics, with many of the issues of concern to early thinkers arising in different form. Heisenberg's uncertainty principle and the clinamen of the Epicureans.

=== Philosophy of movement ===
The philosophy of movement is also a subfield of contemporary philosophy related to process philosophy and defined by the study of social, aesthetic, scientific, and ontological domains from the perspective of the primacy of movement. This includes philosophers such as Erin Manning, Thomas Nail and Jaime del Val.

== See also ==
https://plato.stanford.edu/entries/spacetime-theories-classical/
