= Ran Lahav =

"Israeli-born American philosopher"

Ran Lahav (Hebrew: רן להב; born April 17, 1954) is an Israeli-born American philosopher who developed philosophical activities for the general public. Since the early 1990s he has given workshops and retreats around the world, and published books and articles. Since the early 2010s he has been developing formats of philosophical contemplation, known as Deep Philosophy.

== Education ==
Ran Lahav received his bachelor's degree in philosophy and psychology from the Hebrew University in Jerusalem. In 1988 he completed his PhD in philosophy at the University of Michigan with a doctoral thesis on the nature of subjective experience, as well as a master's degree in psychology.

== Philosophical career ==
In 1992, Lahav joined the then-nascent philosophical practice movement, which seeks to make philosophy relevant to individuals’ everyday lives. In 1993 he taught philosophical counseling at Haifa University, and in 1993 he initiated and co-organized the first international conference on philosophical counseling at the University of British Columbia, and edited the anthology Essays on philosophical counseling (1995), the first book in English in the field.

He has developed philosophical methods of self-transformation and contemplative forms of philosophizing (called Deep Philosophy) and used them in group activities. In 2017 he founded the Deep Philosophy Group in which participants contemplate together from their inner depth on short philosophical texts.

== Publications ==
=== Philosophy books ===
- Essays on Philosophical Counseling, Lanham: University Press of America, 1995. (Edited anthology with second editor Maria Tillmanns). ISBN 978-0819199737
- Stepping out of Plato’s Cave, Loyev Books, 2016. ISBN 978-0998133034
- Philosophical Contemplation, Loyev Books, 2018. ISBN 978-1947515949
- What is Deep Philosophy?, Loyev Books, 2021. ISBN 978-1947515093
