= Shlomit C. Schuster =

Israeli philosophical counselor (1951–2016)

- שלומית שוסטר
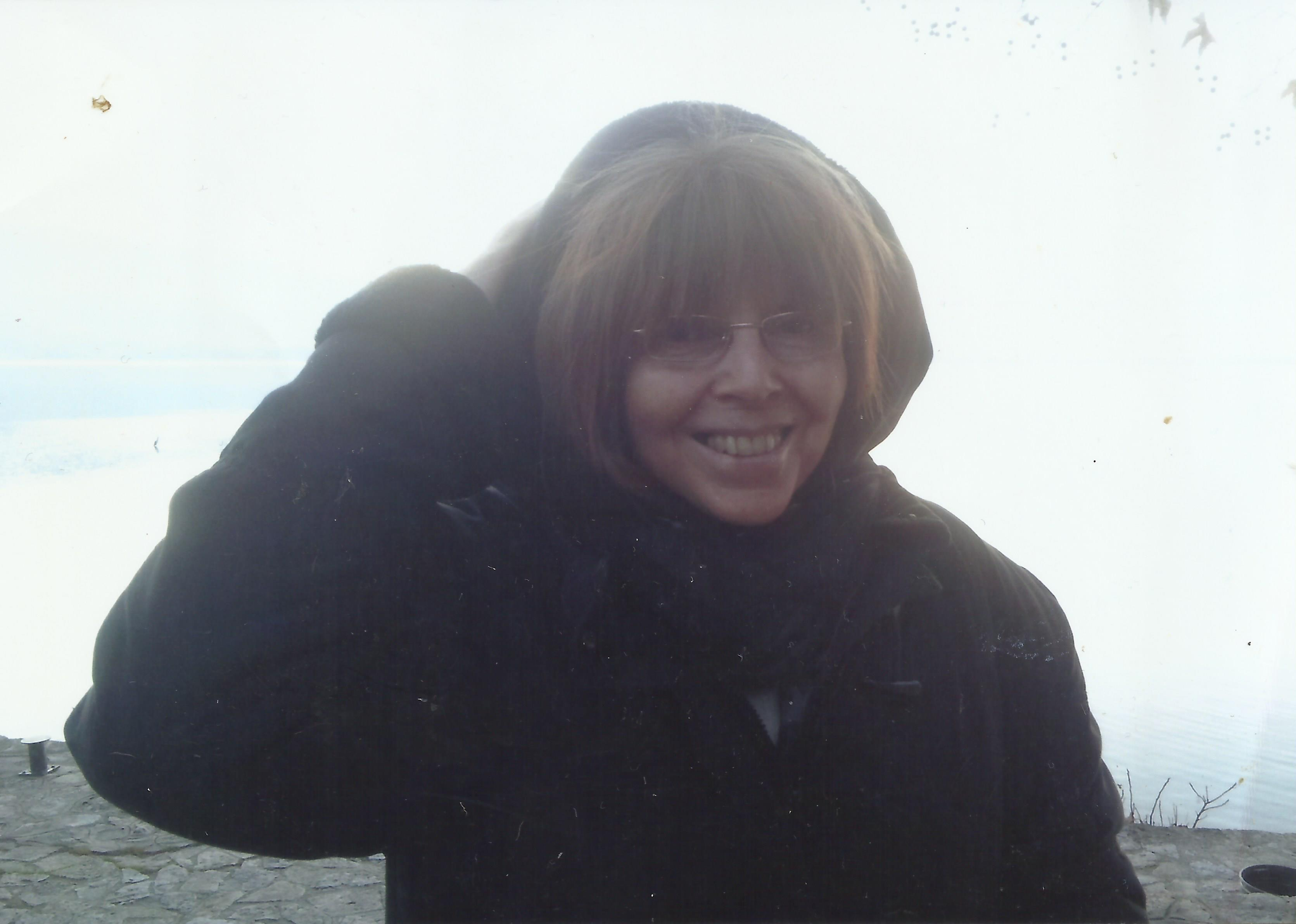
- Schuster in 2013
- Born: 19 July 1951; Paramaribo, Suriname
- Died: 15 February 2016 (aged 64); Jerusalem, Israel
- Occupation: Philosophical counselor

Shlomit C. Schuster (Hebrew: שלומית שוסטר; born 19 July 1951 in Paramaribo, Suriname; died 15 February 2016 in Jerusalem, Israel) was an Israeli philosophical counselor, considered a pioneer in the field.

Schuster migrated to Israel in 1976 and studied philosophy at Hebrew University of Jerusalem. She trained under the Dutch philosophical counselor Ad Hoogendijk, a colleague of Gerd B. Achenbach. In 1989, she opened the philosophical counseling center Sophon Jerusalem. In 1990, she launched the philosophical first-aid line "Philosophone", for persons with existential problems and ethical challenges. In 2000, she received her Ph.D. degree. Her thesis, conducted by Marcel-Jacques Dubois and Maurice S. Friedman, described the life of central philosophers in order to find ways to help people through their autobiography.

She was an editorial board member of the Journal of Radical Psychology, the International Journal for Philosophical Practice, and the Journal of Humanities Therapy.

Schuster died in Jerusalem on 15 February 2016, after a serious illness.

== Books ==
- Philosophy Practice: An Alternative to Counseling and Psychotherapy (1999), Translated to Dutch (2001), Italian (2006), and Chinese (2007).
- The Philosopher's Autobiography: A Qualitative Study (2003)
