= Process philosophy =

Philosophical approach

Process philosophy (also ontology of becoming or processism) is an approach in philosophy that identifies processes, changes, or shifting relationships as the only real experience of everyday living. In opposition to the classical view of change as illusory (as argued by Parmenides) or accidental (as argued by Aristotle), process philosophy posits transient occasions of change or becoming as the most fundamental things of the ordinary everyday real world.

Since the time of Plato and Aristotle, classical ontology has posited ordinary world reality as constituted of enduring substances, to which transient processes are ontologically subordinate, if they are not denied. If Socrates changes, becomes sick, Socrates is still the same (the substance of Socrates being the same), and change (his sickness) only glides over his substance: change is accidental, and devoid of primary reality, whereas the substance is essential.

In physics, Ilya Prigogine distinguishes between the "physics of being" and the "physics of becoming". Process philosophy covers not just scientific intuitions and experiences, but can be used as a conceptual bridge to facilitate discussions among religion, philosophy, and science.

Process philosophy is sometimes classified as closer to continental philosophy than analytic philosophy, because it is usually only taught in continental philosophy departments. However, other sources state that process philosophy should be placed somewhere in the middle between the poles of analytic versus continental methods in contemporary philosophy.

== History ==
=== Ancient Greek thought ===
Heraclitus proclaimed that the basic nature of all things is change; he posits strife, ἡ ἔρις (hē eris), as the underlying basis of all reality, which is itself thus defined by change.

The quotation from Heraclitus appears in Plato's Cratylus twice; first, in 401d:

τὰ ὄντα ἰέναι τε πάντα καὶ μένειν οὐδέν
Ta onta ienai te panta kai menein ouden
All entities move and nothing remains still.

and, second, in 402a:

πάντα χωρεῖ καὶ οὐδὲν μένει καὶ δὶς ἐς τὸν αὐτὸν ποταμὸν οὐκ ἂν ἐμβαίης
Panta chōrei kai ouden menei kai dis es ton auton potamon ouk an embaies
Everything changes and nothing remains still ... and ... you cannot step twice into the same stream. (Note: This sentence has been translated by Seneca in Epistulae, VI, 58, 23.)

Heraclitus considered fire to be the most fundamental of the elements:

All things are an interchange for fire, and fire for all things, just like goods for gold and gold for goods.

The following is an interpretation of Heraclitus's concepts in modern terms, as understood by Nicholas Rescher:

... reality is not a constellation of things at all, but one of processes. The fundamental 'stuff' of the world is not material substance, but volatile flux, namely 'fire', and all things are versions thereof (puros tropai). Process is fundamental: the river is not an object, but a continuing flow; the sun is not a thing, but an enduring fire. Everything is a matter of process, of activity, of change (panta rhei).

=== Nietzsche and Kierkegaard ===
In his written works, Friedrich Nietzsche proposed what has been regarded as a philosophy of becoming that encompasses a "naturalistic doctrine intended to counter the metaphysical preoccupation with being", and a theory of "the incessant shift of perspectives and interpretations in a world that lacks a grounding essence".

Søren Kierkegaard posed questions of individual becoming in Christianity which were opposed to the Ancient Greek philosophers' focus on the indifferent becoming of the cosmos. However, he established as much of a focus on aporia as Heraclitus and others previously had, such as in his concept of the leap of faith which marks an individual becoming. As well as this, Kierkegaard opposed his philosophy to Hegel's system of philosophy approaching becoming and difference for what he saw as a "dialectical conflation of becoming and rationality", making the system take on the same trait of motionlessness as Parmenides' system.

=== 20th century ===
In the early 20th century, the philosophy of mathematics was undertaken to develop mathematics as an airtight, axiomatic system in which every truth could be derived logically from a set of axioms. In the foundations of mathematics, this project is variously understood as logicism or as part of the formalist program of David Hilbert. Alfred North Whitehead and Bertrand Russell attempted to complete, or at least facilitate, this program with their seminal book Principia Mathematica, which purported to build a logically consistent set theory on which to found mathematics. After this, Whitehead extended his interest to natural science, which he held needed a deeper philosophical basis. He intuited that natural science was struggling to overcome a traditional ontology of timeless material substances that does not suit natural phenomena. According to Whitehead, material is more properly understood as 'process'.

== Whitehead's Process and Reality ==
Alfred North Whitehead began teaching and writing on process and metaphysics when he joined Harvard University in 1924. In his book Science and the Modern World (1925), Whitehead noted that the human intuitions and experiences of science, aesthetics, ethics, and religion influence the worldview of a community, but that in the last several centuries science dominates Western culture. Whitehead sought a holistic, comprehensive cosmology that provides a systematic descriptive theory of the world which can be used for the diverse human intuitions gained through ethical, aesthetic, religious, and scientific experiences, and not just the scientific.

In 1929, Whitehead produced the most famous work of process philosophy, Process and Reality, continuing the work begun by Hegel but describing a more complex and fluid dynamic ontology.

Process thought describes truth as "movement" in and through substance (Hegelian truth), rather than substances as fixed concepts or "things" (Aristotelian truth). Since Whitehead, process thought is distinguished from Hegel in that it describes entities that arise or coalesce in becoming, rather than being simply dialectically determined from prior posited determinates. These entities are referred to as complexes of occasions of experience. It is also distinguished in being not necessarily conflictual or oppositional in operation. Process may be integrative, destructive or both together, allowing for aspects of interdependence, influence, and confluence, and addressing coherence in universal as well as particular developments, i.e., those aspects not befitting Hegel's system. Additionally, instances of determinate occasions of experience, while always ephemeral, are nonetheless seen as important to define the type and continuity of those occasions of experience that flow from or relate to them. Whitehead's influences were not restricted to philosophers or physicists or mathematicians. He was influenced by the French philosopher Henri Bergson (1859–1941), whom he credits along with William James and John Dewey in the preface to Process and Reality.

=== Process metaphysics ===
For Whitehead, metaphysics is about logical frameworks for the conduct of discussions of the character of the world. It is not directly and immediately about facts of nature, but only indirectly so, in that its task is to explicitly formulate the language and conceptual presuppositions that are used to describe the facts of nature. Whitehead thinks that discovery of previously unknown facts of nature can in principle call for reconstruction of metaphysics.

The process metaphysics elaborated in Process and Reality posits an ontology which is based on the two kinds of existence of an entity, that of actual entity and that of abstract entity or abstraction, also called 'object'.

Actual entity is a term coined by Whitehead to refer to the entities that really exist in the natural world. For Whitehead, actual entities are spatiotemporally extended events or processes. An actual entity is how something is happening, and how its happening is related to other actual entities. The actually existing world is a multiplicity of actual entities overlapping one another.

The ultimate abstract principle of actual existence for Whitehead is creativity. Creativity is a term coined by Whitehead to show a power in the world that allows the presence of an actual entity, a new actual entity, and multiple actual entities. Creativity is the principle of novelty. It is manifest in what can be called singular causality, which term may be contrasted with the term nomic causality. An example of singular causation might be that "I woke this morning because my alarm clock rang"; an example of nomic causation is that "alarm clocks generally wake people in the morning." Aristotle recognizes singular causality as efficient causality. For Whitehead, there are many contributory singular causes for an event; for example, a further contributory singular cause of someone being awoken by an alarm clock on a particular morning may be that they were sleeping next to it (till it rang).

An actual entity is a general philosophical term for an utterly determinate and completely concrete individual particular of the actually existing world or universe of changeable entities considered in terms of singular causality, about which categorical statements can be made. Whitehead's most far-reaching and radical contribution to metaphysics is his invention of a better way of choosing the actual entities. Whitehead chooses a way of defining the actual entities that makes them all alike, qua actual entities, with a single exception.

For example, for Aristotle, the actual entities were the substances, such as Socrates. Besides Aristotle's ontology of substances, another example of an ontology that posits actual entities is in the monads of Leibniz, which are said to be 'windowless'. (Note: D. M. Datta, quoting Leibniz in an attempt to explain and analyze the "windowlessness" of monads: First, the monads are substances; therefore, their accidents "cannot separate themselves from substances, nor go about outside of them" and thus "neither substance nor accident can come into a Monad from outside." Secondly, a monad is simple, and therefore it has no parts and "there is no way of explaining how a Monad can be altered in quality or internally changed by any other created thing"; [... t]hirdly, a monad is a spiritual mirror of the whole universe, and it has "no outside" and therefore, 'coming from outside' or 'passing outside from it' is inconceivable.)

==== Whitehead's 'actual entities' ====
For Whitehead's ontology of processes as defining the world, the actual entities exist as the only fundamental elements of reality.

The actual entities are of two kinds, temporal and atemporal.

With one exception, all actual entities for Whitehead are temporal and are occasions of experience (which are not to be confused with consciousness). An entity that people commonly think of as a simple concrete object, or that Aristotle would think of as a substance, is, in this ontology, considered to be a temporally serial composite of indefinitely many overlapping occasions of experience. A human being is thus composed of indefinitely many occasions of experience.

The one exceptional actual entity is at once both temporal and atemporal: God. He is objectively immortal, as well as being immanent in the world. He is objectified in each temporal actual entity; but He is not an eternal object.

The occasions of experience are of four grades. The first grade comprises processes in a physical vacuum such as the propagation of an electromagnetic wave or gravitational influence across empty space. The occasions of experience of the second grade involve just inanimate matter; "matter" being the composite overlapping of occasions of experience from the previous grade. The occasions of experience of the third grade involve living organisms. Occasions of experience of the fourth grade involve experience in the mode of presentational immediacy, which means more or less what are often called the qualia of subjective experience. So far as we know, experience in the mode of presentational immediacy occurs in only more evolved animals. That some occasions of experience involve experience in the mode of presentational immediacy is the one and only reason why Whitehead makes the occasions of experience his actual entities; for the actual entities must be of the ultimately general kind. Consequently, it is inessential that an occasion of experience have an aspect in the mode of presentational immediacy; occasions of the grades one, two, and three, lack that aspect.

There is no mind-matter duality in this ontology, because "mind" is simply seen as an abstraction from an occasion of experience which has also a material aspect, which is of course simply another abstraction from it; thus the mental aspect and the material aspect are abstractions from one and the same concrete occasion of experience. The brain is part of the body, both being abstractions of a kind known as persistent physical objects, neither being actual entities. Though not recognized by Aristotle, there is biological evidence, written about by Galen, that the human brain is an essential seat of human experience in the mode of presentational immediacy. We may say that the brain has a material and a mental aspect, all three being abstractions from their indefinitely many constitutive occasions of experience, which are actual entities.

==== Time, causality, and process ====
Inherent in each actual entity is its respective dimension of time. Potentially, each Whiteheadean occasion of experience is causally consequential on every other occasion of experience that precedes it in time, and has as its causal consequences every other occasion of experience that follows it in time; thus it has been said that Whitehead's occasions of experience are 'all window', in contrast to Leibniz's 'windowless' monads. In time defined relative to it, each occasion of experience is causally influenced by prior occasions of experiences, and causally influences future occasions of experience. An occasion of experience consists of a process of prehending other occasions of experience, reacting to them. This is the process in process philosophy.

Such process is never deterministic. Consequently, free will is essential and inherent to the universe.

The causal outcomes obey the usual well-respected rule that the causes precede the effects in time. Some pairs of processes cannot be connected by cause-and-effect relations, and they are said to be spatially separated. This is in perfect agreement with the viewpoint of the Einstein theory of special relativity and with the Minkowski geometry of spacetime. It is clear that Whitehead respected these ideas, as may be seen for example in his 1919 book An Enquiry concerning the Principles of Natural Knowledge as well as in Process and Reality. In this view, time is relative to an inertial reference frame, different reference frames defining different versions of time.

==== Atomicity ====
The actual entities, the occasions of experience, are logically atomic in the sense that an occasion of experience cannot be cut and separated into two other occasions of experience. This kind of logical atomicity is perfectly compatible with indefinitely many spatio-temporal overlaps of occasions of experience. One can explain this kind of atomicity by saying that an occasion of experience has an internal causal structure that could not be reproduced in each of the two complementary sections into which it might be cut. Nevertheless, an actual entity can completely contain each of indefinitely many other actual entities.

Another aspect of the atomicity of occasions of experience is that they do not change. An actual entity is what it is. An occasion of experience can be described as a process of change, but it is itself unchangeable.

The atomicity of the actual entities is of a simply logical or philosophical kind, thoroughly different in concept from the natural kind of atomicity that describes the atoms of physics and chemistry.

==== Topology ====
Whitehead's theory of extension was concerned with the spatio-temporal features of his occasions of experience. Fundamental to both Newtonian and to quantum theoretical mechanics is the concept of momentum. The measurement of a momentum requires a finite spatiotemporal extent. Because it has no finite spatiotemporal extent, a single point of Minkowski space cannot be an occasion of experience, but is an abstraction from an infinite set of overlapping or contained occasions of experience, as explained in Process and Reality. Though the occasions of experience are atomic, they are not necessarily separate in extension, spatiotemporally, from one another. Indefinitely many occasions of experience can overlap in Minkowski space.

Nexus is a term coined by Whitehead to show the network actual entity from the universe. In the universe of actual entities spread actual entity. Actual entities are clashing with each other and form other actual entities. The birth of an actual entity based on an actual entity, actual entities around him referred to as nexus.

An example of a nexus of temporally overlapping occasions of experience is what Whitehead calls an enduring physical object, which corresponds closely with an Aristotelian substance. An enduring physical object has a temporally earliest and a temporally last member. Every member (apart from the earliest) of such a nexus is a causal consequence of the earliest member of the nexus, and every member (apart from the last) of such a nexus is a causal antecedent of the last member of the nexus. There are indefinitely many other causal antecedents and consequences of the enduring physical object, which overlap, but are not members, of the nexus. No member of the nexus is spatially separate from any other member. Within the nexus are indefinitely many continuous streams of overlapping nexūs, each stream including the earliest and the last member of the enduring physical object. Thus an enduring physical object, like an Aristotelian substance, undergoes changes and adventures during the course of its existence.

In some contexts, especially in the theory of relativity in physics, the word 'event' refers to a single point in Minkowski or in Riemannian space-time. A point event is not a process in the sense of Whitehead's metaphysics. Neither is a countable sequence or array of points. A Whiteheadian process is most importantly characterized by extension in space-time, marked by a continuum of uncountably many points in a Minkowski or a Riemannian space-time. The word 'event', indicating a Whiteheadian actual entity, is not being used in the sense of a point event.

==== Whitehead's abstractions ====
Whitehead's abstractions are conceptual entities that are abstracted from or derived from and founded upon his actual entities. Abstractions are themselves not actual entities. They are the only entities that can be real but are not actual entities. This statement is one form of Whitehead's 'ontological principle'.

An abstraction is a conceptual entity that refers to more than one single actual entity. Whitehead's ontology refers to importantly structured collections of actual entities as nexuses of actual entities. Collection of actual entities into a nexus emphasizes some aspect of those entities, and that emphasis is an abstraction, because it means that some aspects of the actual entities are emphasized or dragged away from their actuality, while other aspects are de-emphasized or left out or left behind.

'Eternal object' is a term coined by Whitehead. It is an abstraction, a possibility, or pure potential. It can be ingredient into some actual entity. It is a principle that can give a particular form to an actual entity.

Whitehead admitted indefinitely many eternal objects. An example of an eternal object is a number, such as the number 'two'. Whitehead held that eternal objects are abstractions of a very high degree of abstraction. Many abstractions, including eternal objects, are potential ingredients of processes.

==== Relation between actual entities and abstractions stated in the ontological principle ====
For Whitehead, besides its temporal generation by the actual entities which are its contributory causes, a process may be considered as a concrescence of abstract ingredient eternal objects. God enters into every temporal actual entity.

Whitehead's ontological principle is that whatever reality pertains to an abstraction is derived from the actual entities upon which it is founded or of which it is comprised.

==== Causation and concrescence of a process ====
Concrescence is a term coined by Whitehead for the process of a new occasion manifesting as "fully actual"—i.e., becoming concrete—and, having completed this process of actualization (achieving satisfaction, in his terms), in turn becoming an objective datum for successor occasions. The concretion process can be regarded as a process of subjectification.

Datum is a term coined by Whitehead to show the different variants of information possessed by actual entity. In process philosophy, each datum is obtained through the events of concrescence.

== Commentary on Whitehead and on process philosophy ==
Whitehead is not an idealist in the strict sense. Whitehead's thought may be regarded as related to the idea of panpsychism (also known as panexperientialism, because of Whitehead's emphasis on experience).

=== On God ===
Whitehead's philosophy is complex and nuanced regarding the concept of "God". In Process and Reality: Corrected Edition (1978), the editors elaborate upon Whitehead's view of the concept:

He is the unconditioned actuality of conceptual feeling at the base of things; so that by reason of this primordial actuality, there is an order in the relevance of eternal objects to the process of creation. [...] The particularities of the actual world presuppose it; while it merely presupposes the general metaphysical character of creative advance, of which it is the primordial exemplification.

Process philosophy might be considered, according to some theistic forms of religion, to give God a special place in the universe of occasions of experience. Regarding Whitehead's use of the term "occasions" in reference to "God", Process and Reality: Corrected Edition explains:

'Actual entities' – also termed 'actual occasions' – are the final real things of which the world is made up. There is no going behind actual entities to find anything more real. They differ among themselves: God is an actual entity, and so is the most trivial puff of existence in far-off empty space. But, though there are gradations of importance, and diversities of function, yet in the principles which actuality exemplifies all are on the same level. The final facts are, all alike, actual entities; and these actual entities are drops of experience, complex and interdependent.

It also can be assumed, within some forms of theology, that a God encompasses all the other occasions of experience, yet also transcends them; it might, therefore, be argued that Whitehead endorses some form of panentheism. Since (as it is argued in many theologies) "free will" is inherent to the nature of the universe, Whitehead's God is not omnipotent in Whitehead's metaphysics. God's role is to offer enhanced occasions of experience. God participates in the evolution of the universe by offering possibilities, which may be accepted or rejected. Whitehead's thinking here has given rise to process theology, whose prominent advocates include Charles Hartshorne, John B. Cobb, Jr., and Hans Jonas (with the latter being influenced by the—non-theological—philosopher Martin Heidegger as well). However, other process philosophers have questioned Whitehead's theology, seeing it as a regressive Platonism.

Whitehead enumerated three essential natures of God. First, the primordial nature of God consists of all potentialities of existence for actual occasions, which Whitehead dubbed eternal objects; God can offer possibilities by ordering the relevance of eternal objects. Second, the consequent nature of God prehends everything that happens in reality; as such, God experiences all of reality in a sentient manner. Third and last, the superjective nature is the way in which God's synthesis becomes a sense-datum for other actual entities; in some sense, God is prehended by existing actual entities.

== Legacy and applications ==
=== Biology ===
In plant morphology, Rolf Sattler developed a process morphology (dynamic morphology) that overcomes the structure/process (or structure/function) dualism that is commonly taken for granted in biology. According to process morphology, structures such as leaves of plants do not have processes, they are processes.

In evolution and in development, the nature of the changes of biological objects are considered by many authors to be more radical than in physical systems. In biology, changes are not just changes of state in a pre-given space, instead the space and more generally the mathematical structures required to understand object change over time.

=== Ecology ===
With its perspective that everything is interconnected, that all life has value, and that non-human entities are also experiencing subjects, process philosophy has played an important role in discourse on ecology and sustainability. The first book to connect process philosophy with environmental ethics was John B. Cobb, Jr.'s 1971 work, Is It Too Late: A Theology of Ecology. In a more recent book (2018) edited by John B. Cobb, Jr. and Wm. Andrew Schwartz, Putting Philosophy to Work: Toward an Ecological Civilization contributors explicitly explore the ways in which process philosophy can be put to work to address the most urgent issues facing our world today, by contributing to a transition toward an ecological civilization. That book emerged from the largest international conference held on the theme of ecological civilization (Seizing an Alternative: Toward an Ecological Civilization) which was organized by the Center for Process Studies in June 2015. The conference brought together roughly 2,000 participants from around the world and featured such leaders in the environmental movement as Bill McKibben, Vandana Shiva, John B. Cobb, Jr., Wes Jackson, and Sheri Liao. The notion of ecological civilization is often affiliated with the process philosophy of Alfred North Whitehead—especially in China.

=== Mathematics ===
In the philosophy of mathematics, some of Whitehead's ideas re-emerged in combination with cognitivism as the cognitive science of mathematics and embodied mind theses.

Somewhat earlier, exploration of mathematical practice and quasi-empiricism in mathematics from the 1950s to 1980s had sought alternatives to metamathematics in social behaviours around mathematics itself: for instance, Paul Erdős's simultaneous belief in Platonism and a single "big book" in which all proofs existed, combined with his personal obsessive need or decision to collaborate with the widest possible number of other mathematicians. The process, rather than the outcomes, seemed to drive his explicit behaviour and odd use of language, as if the synthesis of Erdős and collaborators in seeking proofs, creating sense-datum for other mathematicians, was itself the expression of a divine will. Certainly, Erdős behaved as if nothing else in the world mattered, including money or love, as emphasized in his biography The Man Who Loved Only Numbers.

=== Medicine ===
Several fields of science and especially medicine seem to make liberal use of ideas in process philosophy, notably the theory of pain and healing of the late 20th century. The philosophy of medicine began to deviate somewhat from scientific method and an emphasis on repeatable results in the very late 20th century by embracing population thinking, and a more pragmatic approach to issues in public health, environmental health, and especially mental health. In this latter field, R. D. Laing, Thomas Szasz, and Michel Foucault were instrumental in moving medicine away from emphasis on "cures" and towards concepts of individuals in balance with their society, both of which are changing, and against which no benchmarks or finished "cures" were very likely to be measurable.

=== Psychology ===
In psychology, the subject of imagination was again explored more extensively since Whitehead, and the question of feasibility or "eternal objects" of thought became central to the impaired theory of mind explorations that framed postmodern cognitive science. A biological understanding of the most eternal object, that being the emerging of similar but independent cognitive apparatus, led to an obsession with the process "embodiment", that being, the emergence of these cognitions. Like Whitehead's God, especially as elaborated in J. J. Gibson's perceptual psychology emphasizing affordances, by ordering the relevance of eternal objects (especially the cognitions of other such actors), the world becomes. Or, it becomes simple enough for human beings to begin to make choices, and to prehend what happens as a result. These experiences may be summed in some sense but can only approximately be shared, even among very similar cognitions with identical DNA. An early explorer of this view was Alan Turing who sought to prove the limits of expressive complexity of human genes in the late 1940s, to put bounds on the complexity of human intelligence and so assess the feasibility of artificial intelligence emerging. Since 2000, Process Psychology has progressed as an independent academic and therapeutic discipline: In 2000, Michel Weber created the Whitehead Psychology Nexus: an open forum dedicated to the cross-examination of Alfred North Whitehead's process philosophy and the various facets of the contemporary psychological field.

=== Philosophy of movement ===
The philosophy of movement is a sub-area within process philosophy that treats processes as movements. It studies processes as flows, folds, and fields in historical patterns of centripetal, centrifugal, tensional, and elastic motion. See Thomas Nail's philosophy of movement and process materialism.

== See also ==
Concepts

- Actual idealism
- Anicca, the Buddhist doctrine that all is "transient, evanescent, inconstant"
- Panta rhei, Heraclitus's concept that "everything flows"
- Dialectic
- Dialectical monism
- Elisionism
- Holomovement
- Pancreativism
- Salishan languages#Nounlessness
- Speculative realism

People

- John B. Cobb
- David Ray Griffin
- Arthur Peacocke
- Michel Weber
- Arran Gare
- Joseph A. Bracken
- Milič Čapek
- Wilfrid Sellars
- Wilmon Henry Sheldon
- Thomas Nail
- Iain McGilchrist
- Eugene Gendlin
- Rein Raud
- Charles Hartshorne
