= Socratic questioning =

Type of question to predict knowledge on topic

Socratic questioning (or Socratic maieutics) is an educational method named after Socrates that focuses on discovering answers by asking questions of students. According to Plato, Socrates believed that "the disciplined practice of thoughtful questioning enables the scholar/student to examine ideas and be able to determine the validity of those ideas". Plato explains how, in this method of teaching, the teacher assumes an ignorant mindset in order to compel the student to assume the highest level of knowledge. Thus, a student is expected to develop the ability to acknowledge contradictions, recreate inaccurate or unfinished ideas, and critically determine necessary thought.

Socratic questioning is a form of disciplined questioning that can be used to pursue thought in many directions and for many purposes, including the following: to explore complex ideas, to get to the truth of things, to open up issues and problems, to uncover assumptions, to analyze concepts, to distinguish what we know from what we do not know, to follow out logical consequences of thought, or to control discussions. Socratic questioning is based on the foundation that thinking has structured logic, and allows underlying thoughts to be questioned. The key to distinguishing Socratic questioning from questioning per se is that the former is systematic, disciplined, deep and usually focuses on fundamental concepts, principles, theories, issues or problems.

== Pedagogy ==
When teachers use Socratic questioning in teaching, their purpose may be to probe student thinking, to determine the extent of student knowledge on a given topic, issue or subject, to model Socratic questioning for students or to help students analyze a concept or line of reasoning. It is suggested that students should learn the discipline of Socratic questioning to begin to use it in reasoning through complex issues, in understanding and assessing the thinking of others and in following out the implications of what they and others think. In fact, Socrates thought questioning was the only defensible form of teaching.

In teaching, teachers can use Socratic questioning for at least two purposes:

- To deeply probe student thinking, to help students begin to distinguish what they know or understand from what they do not know or understand (and to help them develop intellectual humility in the process).
- To foster students' abilities to ask Socratic questions, to help students acquire the powerful tools of Socratic dialogue, so that they can use these tools in everyday life (in questioning themselves and others). To this end, teachers can model the questioning strategies they want students to emulate and employ. Moreover, teachers need to directly teach students how to construct and ask deep questions. Beyond that, students need practice to improve their questioning abilities.

Socratic questioning illuminates the importance of questioning in learning. This includes differentiating between systematic and fragmented thinking, while forcing individuals to understand the root of their knowledge and ideas. Educators who support the use of Socratic questioning in educational settings argue that it helps students become active and independent learners. Examples of Socratic questions that are used for students in educational settings:

1. Getting students to clarify their thinking and explore the origin of their thinking
  e.g., 'Why do you say that?', 'Could you explain further?'
2. Challenging students about assumptions
  e.g., 'Is this always the case?', 'Why do you think that this assumption holds here?'
3. Providing evidence as a basis for arguments
  e.g., 'Why do you say that?', 'Is there reason to doubt this evidence?'
4. Discovering alternative viewpoints and perspectives and conflicts between contentions
  e.g., 'What is the counter-argument?', 'Can/did anyone see this another way?'
5. Exploring implications and consequences
  e.g., 'But if this happened, what else would result?', 'How does it affect this?'
6. Questioning the question
  e.g., 'Why do you think that I asked that question?', 'Why was that question important?', 'Which of your questions turned out to be the most useful?'

== Socratic questioning and critical thinking ==
The art of Socratic questioning is intimately connected with critical thinking because the art of questioning is important to excellence of thought. Socrates argued for the necessity of probing individual knowledge, and acknowledging what one may not know or understand. Critical thinking has the goal of reflective thinking that focuses on what should be believed or done about a topic. Socratic questioning adds another level of thought to critical thinking, by focusing on extracting depth, interest and assessing the truth or plausibility of thought. Socrates argued that a lack of knowledge is not bad, but students must strive to make known what they don't know through the means of a form of critical thinking.

Critical thinking and Socratic questioning both seek meaning and truth. Critical thinking provides the rational tools to monitor, assess, and perhaps reconstitute or re-direct our thinking and action. This is what educational reformer John Dewey described as reflective inquiry: "in which the thinker turns a subject over in the mind, giving it serious and consecutive consideration." Socratic questioning is an explicit focus on framing self-directed, disciplined questions to achieve that goal.

The technique of questioning or leading discussion is spontaneous, exploratory, and issue-specific. The Socratic educator listens to the viewpoints of the student and considers the alternative points of view. It is necessary to teach students to sift through all the information, form a connection to prior knowledge, and transform the data to new knowledge in a thoughtful way. Some qualitative research shows that the use of the Socratic questioning within a traditional Yeshiva education setting helps students succeed in law school, although it remains an open question as to whether that relationship is causal or merely correlative.

It has been proposed in different studies that the "level of thinking that occurs is influenced by the level of questions asked". Thus, utilizing the knowledge that students don't know stimulates their ability to ask more complex questions. This requires educators to create conducive learning environments that promote and value the role of critical thinking, mobilising their ability to form complex thoughts and questions.

== Psychology ==
Socratic questioning has also been used in psychotherapy, most notably as a cognitive restructuring technique in classical Adlerian psychotherapy, logotherapy, rational emotive behavior therapy, cognitive therapy, and logic-based therapy. The purpose is to help uncover the assumptions and evidence that underpin people's thoughts in respect of problems. A set of Socratic questions in cognitive therapy aims to deal with automatic thoughts that distress the patient:

1. Revealing the issue: 'What evidence supports this idea? And what evidence is against its being true?'
2. Conceiving reasonable alternatives: 'What might be another explanation or viewpoint of the situation? Why else did it happen?'
3. Examining various potential consequences: 'What are worst, best, bearable and most realistic outcomes?'
4. Evaluate those consequences: 'What's the effect of thinking or believing this? What could be the effect of thinking differently and no longer holding onto this belief?'
5. Distancing: 'Imagine a specific friend/family member in the same situation or if they viewed the situation this way, what would I tell them?'

Careful use of Socratic questioning enables a therapist to challenge recurring or isolated instances of a person's illogical thinking while maintaining an open position that respects the internal logic to even the most seemingly illogical thoughts.

== See also ==
- Argument map
- Argumentation theory
- Cross-examination
- Inquiry
- Intellectual virtue
- Interrogation
- Issue map
- Socratic method
- Meno § Dialogue with Meno's slave
