= Wilmon Henry Sheldon =

American philosopher

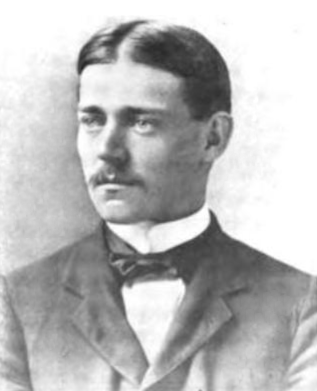
- Born: April 4, 1875; Newton Highlands, Massachusetts, US
- Died: February 26, 1980 (aged 104); Pittsford, Vermont, US
- Era: 20th-century philosophy
- School: Process philosophy

Wilmon Henry Sheldon (1875–1980) was a twentieth-century American philosopher.

== Life and career ==
Wilmon Henry Sheldon was born in Newton Highlands, Massachusetts on April 4, 1875.

He was educated at Harvard University and taught at Yale.

He died in Pittsford, Vermont on February 26, 1980, and was interred at the Central Burying Grounds in Hamden, Connecticut.

== Major works ==
- Strife of Systems and Productive Duality: An Essay in Philosophy. Harvard University Press. 1918.
- America's Progressive Philosophy. New Haven, CT: Yale University Press. 1942.
- Process and Polarity (Woodbridge Lectures, Columbia University). 1944.
- God and Polarity: A Synthesis of Philosophies. 1954.
