= Joseph A. Bracken =

American philosopher (1930–2024)

- Born: March 22, 1930; Chicago, Illinois, U.S.
- Died: April 13, 2024 (aged 94); Wauwatosa, Wisconsin, U.S.

Philosophical work
- Era: 20th century philosophy
- Region: Western philosophy
- School: Process philosophy
- Main interests: Theology, Metaphysics, Trinity
- Notable ideas: Process philosophy, Process theology

Joseph A. Bracken, S.J. (March 22, 1930 – April 13, 2024) was an American philosopher and Catholic theologian. Bracken was a proponent of process philosophy and process theology of Alfred North Whitehead and Charles Hartshorne. Much of his work is devoted to a synthesis of revealed religion and Christian trinitarian doctrines with a revised process theology. Bracken introduced a field theoretic approach to process metaphysics.

== Biography ==
Bracken was born on 22 March 1930 in Chicago, Illinois on March 22, 1930.

Bracken graduated from Saint Ignatius College Prep in Chicago in 1948 and attended Loyola University Chicago for one year before entering the Missouri Province of the Society of Jesus on August 18, 1949, at St. Stanislaus Jesuit novitiate in Florissant, Missouri. He was ordained a priest on June 10, 1962, at West Baden College in West Baden Springs, Indiana, and pronounced final vows on February 2, 1967, at St. Blasien Church in Germany.

Bracken was emeritus Professor of Theology at Xavier University in Cincinnati, Ohio, United States. He received his PhD from the University of Freiburg in Germany in 1968, and taught at University of Saint Mary of the Lake Mundelein Seminary in Illinois (1968–1974), and at Marquette University in Milwaukee, Wisconsin (1974–1982), before becoming Chairman of the Theology Department at Xavier in 1982.

Bracken died in Wauwatosa, Wisconsin on April 13, 2024, at the age of 94.

== Work ==
Bracken was the author and/or editor of 11 books and wrote about 150 articles in academic journals.

He briefly summarized his approach in a book review in 2007: This is why in my own rethinking of Whitehead's metaphysics I presumed from the start that his metaphysical categories needed revision in order to accommodate Christian belief in God as Trinity. With this in mind, I soon realized that Whitehead's key category of "society" needed further development. A "society," after all, must be more than an aggregate of actual occasions with a "common element of form" (PR 1968, 34) if philosophical atomism is to be avoided. My own solution was to reinterpret a Whiteheadian society as an enduring structured field of activity for successive generations of constituent actual occasions. Thus understood, a Whiteheadian "society" serves both to legitimate a trinitarian process-oriented understanding of God and to make Whitehead's philosophy an even stronger social ontology than he himself envisioned. That is, "the final real things of which the world is made up" are not simply actual occasions but the societies into which they spontaneously aggregate.

== Bibliography ==
=== Books by Bracken ===
- 1972. Freiheit und Kausalität bei Schelling. Alber Verlag, ISBN 3-495-47226-6.
- 1979. What Are They Saying about the Trinity?. Paulist Press, ISBN 0-8091-2179-4.
- 1985. The Triune Symbol: Persons, Process and Community. University Press of America, ISBN 0-8191-4440-1.
- 1991. Society and Spirit: A Trinitarian Cosmology. Associated University Presses, ISBN 0-945636-21-0 (Google Books).
- 1995. The Divine Matrix: Creativity as Link between East and West. Orbis Books, ISBN 81-208-1416-9 (Google Books).
- 1997 (edited by J. Bracken and M. Suchocki). Trinity in Process: A Relational Theology God. Continuum Publ., ISBN 0-8264-0878-8.
- 2001. The One in the Many: A Contemporary Reconstruction of the God-World Relationship. Eerdmans, ISBN 0-8028-4892-3 (Google Books).
- 2005 (edited by J. Bracken). World Without End: Christian Eschatology from a Process Perspective. Eerdmans, ISBN 0-8028-2811-6 (Google Books).
- 2006. Christianity and Process Thought: Spirituality for a Changing World. Templeton Foundation Press, ISBN 1-932031-98-7 (Google Books).
- 2008. God: Three Who Are One. Liturgical Press, ISBN 0-8146-5990-X (Google Books).
- 2009. Subjectivity, Objectivity and Intersubjectivity: A New Paradigm for Religion and Science. Templeton Foundation Press, ISBN 1-59947-152-3.
- 2012. Does God Roll Dice? Divine Providence for a World in the Making Liturgical Press, ISBN 978-0-8146-8052-0 - ISBN 978-0-8146-8053-7
- 2014. The World in the Trinity: Open-Ended Systems in Science and Religion Fortress Press, ISBN 978-1-4514-8205-8 - ISBN 978-1-4514-8755-8

=== Articles by Bracken ===
- 1974. The Holy Trinity as a Community of Divine Persons, I. The Heythrop Journal 15(2): 166-182 (PDF)
- 1974. The Holy Trinity as a Community of Divine Persons, II. The Heythrop Journal 15(3): 257-270 (PDF)
- 1978. Process Philosophy and Trinitarian Theology Process Studies 3(4): 217-230 (fulltext online).
- 1989. Energy-Events and Fields. Process Studies 18(3): 153-165 (fulltext online).
- 1998. Revising Process Metaphysics in Response to Ian Barbour's Critique. Zygon 33(3): 405-414 (Abstract).
- 2000. Prehending God in and through the World Process Studies 29(1): 4-15 (fulltext online).
- 2001. Absolute Nothingness and The Divine Matrix. The International Journal for Field-Being 1(1), Part 1, Article No. 6 (PDF)
- 2006. Bodily Resurrection and the Dialectic of Spirit and Matter Online Essay at Metanexus
- 2007. Space and Time from a Neo-Whiteheadian Perspective. Zygon 42(1): 41-48 (Abstract).
- 2010. God, Chance and Purpose: Implications for Process Theology. Process Studies 39/1, 106–16.
- 2010. Feeling Our Way Forward: Continuity and Discontinuity Within the Cosmic Process. Theology and Science 8/3, 319–32.
- 2010. Teilhard, Whitehead, and a Metaphysics of Intersubjectivity, Rediscovering Teilhard's Fire Kathleen Duffy, S.S.J. (Philadelphia, PA: Saint Joseph's University Press), 163–71.
- 2012. Whiteheadian Societies as Open-Ended Systems and Open-Ended Systems as Whiteheadian Societies. Process Studies 41/1, 64–85.
- 2013. Veiled Reality and Structural Realism. Theology and Science 11/1, 32–43
- 2013. Emergence: A New Approach to the Perennial Problem of the One and the Many. Journal of Arts and Humanities 2/1, 25–33.
- 2013. Actual Entities and Societies, Gene Mutations and Cell Development: Implications for a New World View. Process Studies 42/1, 64–76.
- 2013. Actions and Agents: Natural and Supernatural Reconsidered. Religion and Science 48/4, 1001–13.
- 2014. Whiteheadian Societies and Peirce's Law of Mind: Actuality and Potentiality in the Cosmic Process. Theology and Science 12/4, 396–412.
- 2014. Whiteheadian Metaphysics, General Relativity, and String Theory. Process Studies 43/2, 129–43.
- 2014. Panentheism in the Context of Theology and Science Dialogue. "Open Theology", vol. 1, 1–11. Open Access: https://doi.org/10.2478/opth-2014-0001
- 2018. Divine-Human Intersubjectivity and the Problem of Evil. "Open Theology", vol. 4, 60–70. Open Access: https://doi.org/10.1515/opth-2018-0005.

=== Works about Bracken and his thought ===
- Cecil, Paul Lewis 2000. A Response to Joseph Bracken’s "Prehending God in and through the World". Process Studies 29(2): 358-364 (fulltext online).
- Marc A. Pugliese, 2011. The One, the Many and the Trinity: Joseph A. Bracken and the Challenge of Process Metaphysics. The Catholic University of America Press. ISBN 978-0-8132-1794-9
- Marc A. Pugliese & Gloria L. Schaab, SSJ 2012. Seeking Common Ground: Evaluation and Critique of Joseph Bracken's Comprehensive World View. Marquette University Press. ISBN 978-0-87462-799-2

== See also ==
- Process philosophy
- Process theology
