= Practical philosophy =

Branch of philosophy regarding practice as opposed to theory

Practical philosophy concerns itself mainly with subjects that have applications in life, like the study of values, norms, politics, art, etc. The modern division of philosophy into theoretical philosophy and practical philosophy has its origin in Aristotle's categories of natural and moral philosophy. The one has theory for its object, and the other practice.

== Subjects of practical philosophy ==
Examples of practical philosophy subjects are:

- Ethics
- Aesthetics
- Decision theory
- Political philosophy

== Philosophical counseling ==
Practical philosophy is also the use of philosophy and philosophical techniques in everyday life. This can take a number of forms including reflective practice, personal philosophical thinking, and philosophical counseling.

Examples of philosophical counseling subjects include:

- Philosophical counseling
- Philosophy of education
- Philosophy of law
- Philosophy of religion
- Philosophy of history
- Philosophy of social science
- Value theory
- Reflective practice

== University education ==
In Sweden and Finland courses in theoretical and practical philosophy are taught separately, and are separate degrees. Other countries may use a similar scheme—some Scottish universities, for example, divide philosophy into logic, metaphysics, and ethics—but in most universities around the world philosophy is taught as a single subject. There is also a unified philosophy subject in some Swedish universities, such as Södertörns Högskola.

== See also ==
- Applied philosophy
- Praxis (process)
