= Thomas Nail =

American philosopher (born 1979)

- Born: 15 December 1979 (age 46); Portland, Oregon, U.S.

Philosophical work
- Era: Contemporary philosophy
- Region: Western philosophy
- School: Continental philosophy New materialism
- Institutions: University of Denver
- Main interests: Political theory, aesthetics, ontology, science studies, anthropocene
- Notable ideas: Process materialism, kinopolitics, kinesthetics

Thomas Nail (born 15 December 1979) is an American philosopher who is a professor of Philosophy at the University of Denver.

== Biography ==
Nail received a B.A in philosophy from the University of North Texas, and a Ph.D. from the University of Oregon. His dissertation was on the theme of political revolution in the work of French philosophers Gilles Deleuze and Félix Guattari and the Zapatista uprising in Chiapas, Mexico. This research was the foundation of his first book, Returning to Revolution: Deleuze, Guattari, and Zapatismo, published in 2012.

== Philosophy ==
Nail has written on the philosophy of movement, which he defines as “the analysis of diverse phenomena across social, aesthetic, scientific, and ontological domains from the primary perspective of motion.” He argues that the philosophy of motion is a unique kind of philosophical methodology. It is related to process philosophy but is distinct from Whitehead's discontinuous "occasions" and from Bergson's vitalism. “The difference between simply describing the motion of things, which almost every philosopher and even layperson has done, and the philosophy of movement is the degree to which movement plays an analytically primary role in the description.”

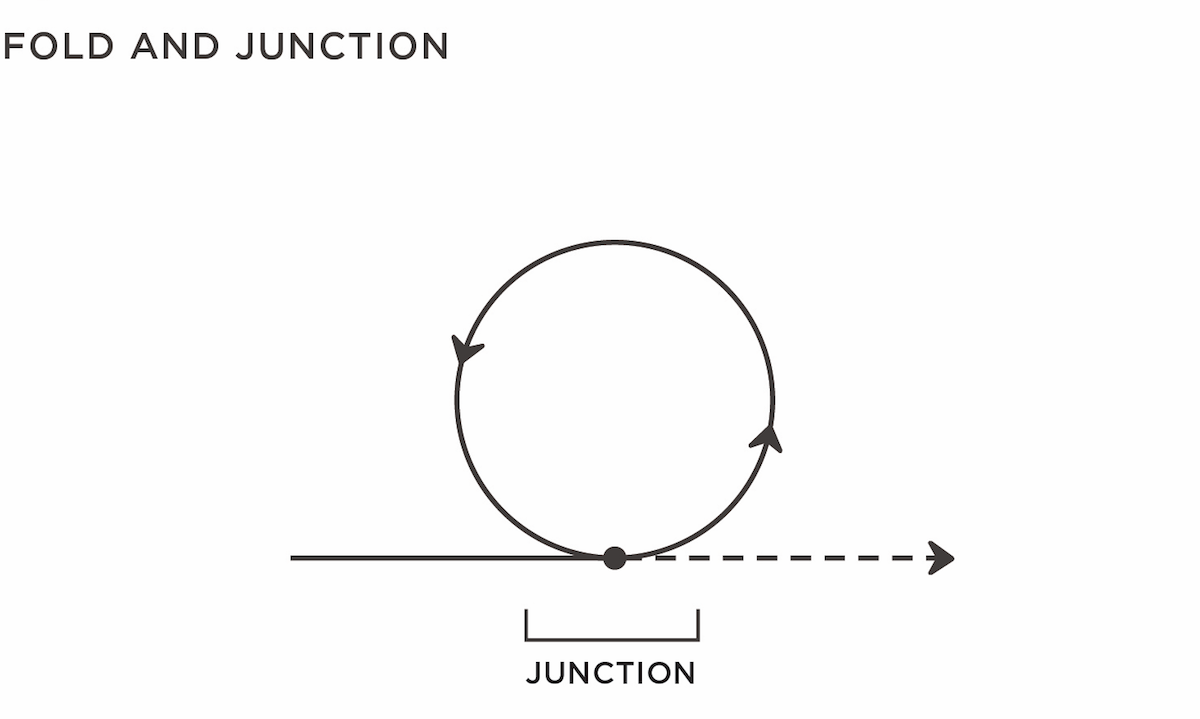
The philosophy of movement studies patterns of motion as they flow and intersect with themselves to create folds or kinetic cycles and junction points.

From the perspective of movement, according to Nail, all seemingly discrete bodies are the result of moving flows of matter that continually fold themselves up in various patterns or what he calls “fields of motion.” Nail's philosophy of movement provides a conceptual framework for the study of these patterns of motion through history.

Nail, however, also claims his philosophy of movement is not a metaphysical theory of reality in itself. Instead, he describes it as a practical and historical methodology oriented by the unprecedented scale and scope of global mobility in the early 21st century. In particular, he names four major historical conditions that situate his thought: mass migration, digital media, quantum physics, and climate change. He therefore describes his philosophy as a “history of the present.”

Nail also describes his work as loosely part of the recent philosophical tradition of new materialism. The term “new materialism” has been applied to numerous and divergent philosophies including speculative realists, object-oriented ontologists, and neo-vitalists who all share in common some version of non-anthropocentric realism. However, Nail's work does not fit into any of these camps. His philosophy of movement instead offers a different kind of new materialism insofar as it focuses on the pedetic/indeterministic motion of matter and its various kinetic patterns. His philosophy is also unique among new materialists, excluding those within archaeology, because of its strongly historical methodology.

=== Works ===
Nail's published work is divided into two primary books series. The first series is composed of six “core” books, each written with a similar organization on five major areas of philosophy: ontology, politics, aesthetics, science, and nature. Each book provides a theory, history, and contemporary case study of the kinetic method. The purpose of each book is to redefine its subject area from a kinetic or process materialist perspective.

The Figure of the Migrant (2015) and Theory of the Border (2016) develop a theory and history of what he terms “kinopolitics” based on the study of patterns of social motion. Theory of the Image (2019) develops a “kinesthetics” of moving images in the arts. Theory of the Object (2021) develops a “kinemetrics” of moving objects in the sciences. Theory of the Earth (2021) develops a “geokinetics” of nature in motion, and Being and Motion (2018) develops an original historical ontology of motion.

The second series is composed of several books, each written on a major historical precursor to the philosophy motion. This includes Lucretius, Karl Marx, and Virginia Woolf. Each book offers a kinetic interpretation and close reading of one of these figures as philosophers who made motion their fundamental starting point. They include Lucretius I: An Ontology of Motion, 2018; Lucretius II: An Ethics of Motion, 2020; Lucretius III: A History of Motion, 2022; Marx in Motion: A New Materialist Marxism, 2020.

=== Criticism ===
On The Figure of the Migrant, Adriana Novoa has written that 'in regards to Mexico, Thomas writes under the assumption that all the migrants originating from this country have the same relationship with movement, but by failing to consider the existence of human diversity in movement, the book simplifies motivations and imposes a mechanistic social meaning. Thomas's theoretical effort does not help us to understand the inequality of humans and its connection with kinetic power. In modern Latin American nations, the dynamics of human movement were shaped, and continue to be shaped, by racial divisions, for example’. Andrew Dilts has written that the book 'gives us both a framework for understanding the movements of peoples...and yet at the same time by not prioritizing the action and self-understandings of those very people, it risks freezing them into the same stasis which the book seeks to resist'.

On Theory of the Border, Alex Sager has written that 'Nail does not offer a theory of the border, at least insofar as we understand theories as offering explanations or predictions. Rather, what he provides is a taxonomy of different types of border technologies that he derives from his understanding of different (mostly) European historical periods. His book gives little guidance for determining when these technologies will emerge, what will motivate them, who they will target and how they will combine. The book's neglect of agents that construct and contest borders is striking.' Avery Kolers has written that 'unfortunately, Nail's writing is less transparent than it could be; the sheer buildup of neologisms is only the beginning of it. More importantly, there are places where it is not fully clear that the analysis hangs together.'

== Bibliography ==
- Returning to Revolution: Deleuze, Guattari and Zapatismo (Edinburgh University Press, 2012, 2015), ISBN 978-0748655861 (hardcover), ISBN 978-0748699797 (paperback)
- The Figure of the Migrant (Stanford University Press, 2015), ISBN 978-0804796583 (paperback), ISBN 978-0804787178 (hardcover)
- Theory of the Border (Oxford University Press, 2016), ISBN 978-0190618650 (paperback), ISBN 978-0190618643 (hardcover)
- Lucretius I: An Ontology of Motion (Edinburgh University Press, 2018), ISBN 978-1474434676 (paperback), ISBN 978-1474434669 (hardcover)
- Being and Motion (Oxford University Press, 2018), ISBN 978-0190908911 (paperback), ISBN 978-0190908904 (hardcover)
- Theory of the Image (Oxford University Press, 2019), ISBN 978-0190050085 (paperback), ISBN 978-0190924034 (hardcover)
- Lucretius II: An Ethics of Motion (Edinburgh University Press, 2020), ISBN 978-1474466646 (paperback), ISBN 978-1474466639 (hardcover)
- Marx in Motion: A New Materialist Marxism (Oxford University Press, 2020), ISBN 978-0197526484 (paperback), ISBN 978-0197526477 (hardcover)
- Theory of the Earth (Stanford University Press, 2021), ISBN 978-1503627550 (paperback), ISBN 978-1503614956 (hardcover)
- Theory of the Object (Edinburgh University Press, 2021), ISBN 978-1474487931 (paperback), ISBN 978-1474487924 (hardcover)
- Lucretius III: A History of Motion (Edinburgh University Press, 2022), ISBN 978-1474464246 (paperback), ISBN 978-1474464239 (hardcover)
- Matter and Motion: A Brief History of Kinetic Materialism (Edinburgh University Press, 2023)
