= Practical syllogism =

Reasoning pattern that links beliefs to actions through a conclusion

The practical syllogism is an instance of practical reasoning which takes the form of a syllogism, where the conclusion of the syllogism is an action.

== Aristotle ==
Aristotle discusses the notion of the practical syllogism within his treatise on ethics, his Nicomachean Ethics. A syllogism is a three-proposition argument consisting of a major premise stating some universal truth, a minor premise stating some particular truth, and a conclusion derived from these two premises. The practical syllogism is a form of practical reasoning in syllogistic form, the conclusion of which is an action. An example might be that the major premise food cures hunger and the minor premise I am hungry leads to the practical conclusion of eating food. Note that the conclusion here is not a third proposition, like I will eat, or the occurrence of an utterance like "I will eat," but is simply the act of eating. For this reason, practical syllogisms are only called syllogisms analogically. Since they do not consist of at least three propositions, they are not syllogisms properly speaking.

=== Nicomachean Ethics ===
The theoretical reason gives no commands. The practical reason operates in the form of a practical syllogism, whose conclusion is epitactic or imperative.

Aristotle describes this syllogism as follows: All deliberate action is resolvable into a major and minor premise, from which the given action logically issues. The major premise is a general conception or moral maxim; the minor premise is a particular instance: and the conclusion is an action involved in subsuming the particular instance under the general conception or law. The conclusion is not an abstraction, as in the case of a theoretical syllogism, but consists in an action and is jussive, e.g.

Major premise: All men should take exercise;

Minor premise: I am a man;

Conclusion: I should take exercise;

or,

Major premise: Good students take notes;

Minor premise: I want to be a good student;

Conclusion: I should take notes.

Our English phrase 'acting on principle' is, as Sir Alexander Grant pointed out, the equivalent of Aristotle's practical syllogism. The practical syllogism operates in the sphere of conduct, of choice and the variable the sphere of necessary truth as is the case with the speculative reason, whose aim is demonstrable truth, whereas the aim of the practical reason is the good, the prudent, the desirable. The content of the conclusion as knowledge is the essential matter for the former; the content of the conclusion as motive is the essential matter for the latter. The main business of the former is with the understanding, of the latter, with the will; the principle of ' sufficient reason' is related to the understanding as the principle of ' final cause' or motive is related to the will. In the practical syllogism obligation is vested in the conclusion, and the particular or minor premise is more cogent than the major, i.e. it is not the general law, but the application of the general law to a particular person, that stimulates to action.

The virtue characteristic of the practical reason is prudence or practical insight. "Prudence is neither a science nor an art; it cannot be a science because the sphere of action is that which is variable; it cannot be an art, for production is generically different from action;" and although Aristotle rejects the Socratic doctrine that virtue is knowledge (the sphere of moral life is pleasure and pain, rather than knowledge), he goes on to say that the "presence of the single virtue of prudence implies the presence of all the moral virtues. Prudence, however, is not itself the whole of moral virtue: "moral virtue makes us desire the end, while prudence makes us adopt the right means to the end." Although men act on general principles and laws, they do not perform general acts; all acts are particular; and so Aristotle, in describing the practical reason and its characteristic moral quality of prudence, further differentiates it from the theoretic reason by saying it is concerned immediately with particulars.
