= Philosophical counseling =

Contemporary movement in practical philosophy

Philosophical consultancy, also sometimes called philosophical practice or philosophical counseling or clinical philosophy, is a contemporary movement in practical philosophy. Developing since the 1980s as a profession but since the 1950s as a practice, practitioners of philosophical counseling ordinarily have a doctorate or minimally a master's degree in philosophy and offer their philosophical counseling or consultation services to clients who look for a philosophical understanding of their lives, social problems, or even mental problems. In the last case, philosophical counseling might be in lieu of, or in conjunction with, psychotherapy.

Philosophical practice has continued to expand and is attractive as an alternative to counselling and psychotherapy for those who prefer to avoid a medicalization of life problems. Numerous philosophical consultants have emerged and there is a strong international interest and a bi-annual international conference.

== History ==
Peter Koestenbaum at San Jose State University in California was an early figure in philosophical counseling. His 1978 book The New Image of the Person: The Theory and Practice of Clinical Philosophy set out the essential contributions of philosophy to counseling. His own practice was augmented by extensive training of mental health professionals in applications of philosophical principles.

Gerd B. Achenbach and Ad Hoogendijk are two German and Dutch philosophers who established themselves as consultant philosophers in the 1980s and led the way to a number of other developments all over the world. They proposed an alternative to psychotherapeutic culture by working exclusively within the field of existential investigation with clients or patients, whom they called 'visitors'.

The world's oldest association of philosophical counseling and practice appears to be the German Society for Philosophical Practice and Counseling, which was founded in 1982 by Achenbach. In the United States, the oldest association of philosophical counseling and practice appears to be the National Philosophical Counseling Association (NPCA), formerly called the American Society for Philosophy, Counseling, and Psychotherapy, which was co-founded in 1992 by three American philosophers, Elliot D. Cohen, Paul Sharkey, and Thomas Magnell. The NPCA offers a primary certificate in logic-based therapy (LBT) through the Institute of Critical Thinking.

The movement is also connected with and related to existential therapy, which has thrived in the United Kingdom since the establishment of the Society for Existential Analysis (SEA) in London in 1988. This was based on the work of Emmy van Deurzen, also a philosopher who has applied philosophical thinking to the practice of psychotherapy. Philosophical consultancy is often applied to business consultancy as well as to individuals, as it frequently involves a rethinking of values and beliefs and is also a method for rational conflict resolution.

Pierre Grimes founded the Noetic Society in 1967 for the study of dialogue and dialectic. He became the head of the Philosophical Midwifery Program when the Noetic Society was incorporated in 1978.

The American Philosophical Practitioners Association (APPA) was founded in 1998 in New York City by Lou Marinoff. APPA offers a certification program in client counseling for those with advanced degrees in philosophy who wish to practice philosophical counseling. It also publishes a professional journal and has a membership list of those certified as philosophical counselors on its website. Marinoff was at the center of a 2004 controversy when his philosophical counseling practice at City College of New York was temporarily shuttered by college officials who feared he was offering mental health advice without proper training and licensing; Marinoff responded by suing for what he described as his freedom of speech being stifled.

Philosophical practice has continued to expand and is attractive as an alternative to counselling and psychotherapy for those who prefer to avoid a medicalization of life problems. Numerous philosophical consultants have emerged and there is a strong international interest and a bi-annual international conference. There are a number of important publications in the field. There are presently a number of professional associations for philosophical counseling throughout the world.

In India an academic course in philosophical counselling is offered by the Department of Philosophy, Panjab University, Chandigarh and the University of Kerala.

Philosophical counselling is an emerging field in Romania and in Italy and there are now specialisations and university courses in this field, with contributions from other European practitioners such as Nicola Velotti. However, there is public debate about the need for a legal framework within which to operate as a profession.

== Goals and methods ==
Philosophical consultancy is a relatively new movement in philosophy that applies philosophical thinking and debating to the resolution of a person's problem. Achenbach argues that it is life that calls to thinking, rather than thinking that informs life; the act of philosophising can, therefore, give direction in its own right, as living precedes thinking and practice precedes theory.

According to the Preamble of the NPCA Standards of Practice,

a philosophical practitioner helps clients to clarify, articulate, explore and comprehend philosophical aspects of their belief systems or world views. ... Clients may consult philosophical practitioners for help in exploring philosophical problems related to such matters as mid-life crises, career changes, stress, emotions, assertiveness, physical illness, death and dying, aging, meaning of life, and morality. On the other side philosophical practitioners also initiate projects in common life worlds with various goals that are related to essential problems of life, such as sustainable energy, direct democracy, etc.

Activities common to philosophical practice include:

1. the examination of clients' arguments and justifications
2. the clarification, analysis, and definition of important terms and concepts
3. the exposure and examination of underlying assumptions and logical implications
4. the exposure of conflicts and inconsistencies
5. the exploration of traditional philosophical theories and their significance for client issues
6. the initiation of projects for common goods
7. all other related activities that have historically been identified as philosophical.

=== Variations ===
The methods and orientations of philosophical counselors vary greatly. Some practitioners, such as Gerd B. Achenbach (Germany), Michel Weber (Belgium) and Shlomit C. Schuster (Israel) are dialogical and dialective engaged, while confessing to a "beyond method" approach. They hold that philosophical counseling has the aim to empower clients' philosophical abilities, which additionally may have therapeutic implications. Other practitioners are more directive and view philosophical counseling as a form of mental health intervention.

Some philosophical practitioners, notably Lou Marinoff (U.S.) and Guenther Witzany (Austria), view philosophical practice as a separate practice area distinct from practices such as psychology, medicine and other forms of mental health counseling; while others, notably Elliot D. Cohen (U.S.), think they are necessarily intertwined. Some philosophical counselors draw inspiration from the anti-psychiatry movement, arguing that widespread mental health diagnostic criteria as outlined in DSM IV have unfairly or inaccurately pathologized humanity.

According to a New York Times article on philosophical counseling, "only Cohen and Marinoff have branded easily comprehended techniques. Cohen's logic-based therapy builds on the work of his mentor Albert Ellis, who invented rational emotive behavior therapy."
