= Gerd B. Achenbach =

German philosopher (born 1947)

Gerd B. Achenbach (born 11 February 1947 in Hameln as Gerd Böttcher) is a German philosopher. He is widely noted for founding the world's first philosophical practice in 1981, a contemporary movement in practical philosophy. He received a doctorate in philosophy under Odo Marquard in 1981.

== Philosophical practice ==
Developing since the 1980s, practitioners of philosophical counseling ordinarily have a doctorate or minimally a master's degree in philosophy and offer their philosophical counseling or consultation services to clients in lieu of, or in conjunction with, more traditional psychotherapy. According to Shlomit C. Schuster, "Achenbach maintains that philosophy is really understood only through its practice, through a personal empathic experience and intellectual cultivation of the subjects of thought".

== Bibliography ==
- Philosophische Praxis (1984) (German; not yet translated into English)
- Lebenskönnerschaft (2001) (German; not yet translated into English)
