= Existential nihilism =

Theory that life has no inherent meaning

Existential nihilism is the philosophical theory that life has no objective meaning or purpose. The inherent meaninglessness of life is largely explored in the philosophical school of existentialism, where one can potentially create their own subjective "meaning" or "purpose". The supposed conflict between our desire for meaning and the reality of a meaningless world is explored in the philosophical school of absurdism. Of all types of nihilism, existential nihilism has received the most literary and philosophical attention.

== History ==
Ecclesiastes in the Bible extensively explores the meaninglessness of life.

The words of the Teacher, son of David, king in Jerusalem:

"Meaningless! Meaningless!"
says the Teacher.
"Utterly meaningless!
Everything is meaningless."

What do people gain from all their labors
at which they toil under the sun?

Generations come and generations go,
but the earth remains forever.

The sun rises and the sun sets,
and hurries back to where it rises.

The wind blows to the south
and turns to the north;
round and round it goes,
ever returning on its course.

All streams flow into the sea,
yet the sea is never full.
To the place the streams come from,
there they return again.

All things are wearisome,
more than one can say.
The eye never has enough of seeing,
nor the ear its fill of hearing.

What has been will be again,
what has been done will be done again;
there is nothing new under the sun.

Is there anything of which one can say,
"Look! This is something new"?
It was here already, long ago;
it was here before our time.

No one remembers the former generations,
and even those yet to come
will not be remembered
by those who follow them.

During the Renaissance, William Shakespeare summarised the existential nihilist's perspective through Macbeth's mindset in the end of the eponymous play.

Tomorrow and tomorrow and tomorrow,
Creeps in this petty pace from day to day
To the last syllable of recorded time,
And all our yesterdays have lighted fools
The way to dusty death. Out, out, brief candle!
Life's but a walking shadow, a poor player
That struts and frets his hour upon the stage
And then is heard no more: it is a tale
Told by an idiot, full of sound and fury,
Signifying nothing.

The philosopher David Hume said:

But the life of a man is of no greater importance to the universe than that of an oyster.

Arthur Schopenhauer, Søren Kierkegaard and Friedrich Nietzsche further expanded on these ideas, and Nietzsche, particularly, has become a major figure in existential nihilism. With Kierkegaard, the concept of absurdism was developed, which explains the concept of humans trying to find meaning in a meaningless world. Samuel Johnson's poem The Vanity of Human Wishes also explores the futility of all endeavours.

The atheistic existentialist movement spread in 1940s France. Jean-Paul Sartre's Being and Nothingness and Albert Camus' The Myth of Sisyphus discussed the topic. Sartre and Camus expanded on the topic of absurdism. Camus wrote further works, such as The Stranger, Caligula, The Plague, The Fall and The Rebel. Other figures include Martin Heidegger and Jacques Derrida. In addition, Ernest Becker's Pulitzer Prize-winning life's work The Denial of Death is a collection of thoughts on existential nihilism.

The common thread in the literature of the existentialists is coping with the emotional anguish arising from our confrontation with nothingness, and they expended great energy responding to the question of whether surviving it was possible. Their answer was a qualified "Yes," advocating a formula of passionate commitment and impassive stoicism.

— Alan Pratt

== Arguments ==
Schopenhauer argued that the fact we feel boredom shows the inherent pointlessness of life, since if life itself had value we would not feel boredom:

Human life must be some kind of mistake. The truth of this will be sufficiently obvious if we only remember that man is a compound of needs and necessities hard to satisfy; and that even when they are satisfied, all he obtains is a state of painlessness, where nothing remains to him but abandonment to boredom. This is direct proof that existence has no real value in itself; for what is boredom but the feeling of the emptiness of life? If life—the craving for which is the very essence of our being—were possessed of any positive intrinsic value, there would be no such thing as boredom at all: mere existence would satisfy us in itself, and we should want for nothing. But as it is, we take no delight in existence except when we are struggling for something; and then distance and difficulties to be overcome make our goal look as though it would satisfy us—an illusion which vanishes when we reach it; or else when we are occupied with some purely intellectual interest—when in reality we have stepped forth from life to look upon it from the outside, much after the manner of spectators at a play. And even sensual pleasure itself means nothing but a struggle and aspiration, ceasing the moment its aim is attained. Whenever we are not occupied in one of these ways, but cast upon existence itself, its vain and worthless nature is brought home to us; and this is what we mean by boredom. The hankering after what is strange and uncommon—an innate and ineradicable tendency of human nature—shows how glad we are at any interruption of that natural course of affairs which is so very tedious.

The theory purports to describe the human situation to create a life outlook and create meaning, which has been summarized as, "Strut, fret, and delude ourselves as we may, our lives are of no significance, and it is futile to seek or to affirm meaning where none can be found." Existential nihilists claim that, to be honest, one must face the absurdity of existence, that they will eventually die, and that both religion and metaphysics are simply results of the fear of death and the endeavor to find meaning in a meaningless universe.

Nihilists contend that the inevitability of death makes all ambition in life pointless.

Peter Wessel Zapffe's view is that humans are born with an overdeveloped skill (understanding, self-knowledge) which does not fit into nature's design. The human craving for justification on matters such as life and death cannot be satisfied, hence humanity has a need that nature cannot satisfy. The tragedy, following this theory, is that humans spend all their time trying not to be human. The human being, therefore, is a paradox.

In The Last Messiah, Zapffe described four principal defense mechanisms that humankind uses to avoid facing this paradox:

1. Isolation is "a fully arbitrary dismissal from consciousness of all disturbing and destructive thought and feeling".
2. Anchoring is the "fixation of points within, or construction of walls around, the liquid fray of consciousness". The anchoring mechanism provides individuals with a value or an ideal to consistently focus their attention on. Zapffe also applied the anchoring principle to society and stated that "God, the Church, the State, morality, fate, the laws of life, the people, the future" are all examples of collective primary anchoring firmaments.
3. Distraction is when "one limits attention to the critical bounds by constantly enthralling it with impressions". Distraction focuses all of one's energy on a task or idea to prevent the mind from turning in on itself.
4. Sublimation is the refocusing of energy away from negative outlets, toward positive ones. The individuals distance themselves and look at their existence from an aesthetic point of view (e.g., writers, poets, painters). Zapffe himself pointed out that his produced works were the product of sublimation.

According to Donald A. Crosby:

The existential nihilist judges [...] that there is no justification for life, but also no reason not to live. Those who claim to find meaning in their lives are either dishonest or deluded. In either case, they fail to face up to the harsh reality of the human situation.

== See also ==
- Absurdism
- Cosmicism
- Dysteleology
- Existence precedes essence
- Logotherapy
- Man's Search for Meaning
- Meaning (existential)
- Meaning of life
- Philosophical pessimism
