= Masquerade of a Dead Sword: A Tragedie =

- Short story by Thomas Ligotti
- Country: America
- Language: English
- Genre(s): Horror, Gothic, heroic fantasy

Publication
- Published in: Songs of a Dead Dreamer
- Publication type: Short story
- Publisher: Silver Scarab Press (first edition)
- Media type: Print
- Publication date: 1986

Chronology
The Troubles of Dr. Thoss	Dr. Voke and Mr. Veech

"Masquerade of a Dead Sword: A Tragedie" (1986) is a short story by American writer Thomas Ligotti, an American horror writer, in his debut collection, Songs of a Dead Dreamer. It was first published by Silver Scarab Press.

The story has been described as heroic fiction, as it takes place in a fantastical, anachronistic world, featuring a brave a hero who performs feats of gallantry and fights an implacable villain with the aid of a wizard. However, like Ligotti's other stories, the worldview is implacably nihilistic and pessimistic, depicting a fear-fraught journey towards death.

== Structure ==
The story is structured like a novelette into three chapters: "I: Faliol's Rescue", "II: The Story of the Spectacles", and "III: Anima Mundi". Faliol is a sword for hire in a medievalist world of chivalry and sovereignty. In the first chapter he is seen wearing strange spectacles. Fighting three thugs in a bar, he puts the spectacles on the last of them and the man is rendered insensible by the horror of what he sees. After this, Faliol meets the man who has most recently hired him: a prince whose beloved has been lured away by a villainous duke with the aid of a wizard.

In the second chapter the true nature of the spectacles is revealed. The wizard, it transpires, is in fact a good man, who gave the spectacles to Faliol to dull the visions of absolute chaos and horror which had been driving him insane. The spectacles refine the world they view to each object's insubstantial essence, exposing the meaninglessness and transience of everything. Faliol's visions, the wizard tells him, are given by the malevolent god Anima Mundi, which wishes to show Faliol the horror of existence.

The third chapter, named for the god, follows Faliol, the wizard, and the prince as they work to reunite the latter with his bride by infiltrating a masked pageant being held at the duke's palace. However, Mundi manifests itself, disrupting their scheme and forcing a philosophical revelation on the tortured Faliol.

== Style and themes ==
In an interview with the website Wonderbook, in response to questions about Joseph Campbell’s Hero’s Journey, Ligotti mentioned this story as his only instance of heroic fiction:

"Heroic fiction is a peculiar genre in which I indulged on only one occasion. The story was “Masquerade of a Dead Sword.” Being me, I had the hero triumph over his adversary, which I characterized as something like the life principle, by killing himself in a manner relevant to the story. I believe that the figure of the hero and the outline of his journey belong strictly to mythologies designed to indoctrinate people into a positive vision of life. These journeys are adaptive from an evolutionary perspective."
