= Glamour Boys =

Glamour Boys may refer to:

- Glamour Boys (politicians), a group of homosexual British Members of Parliament in the 1930s
- "Glamour Boys" (song), a 1988 song by Living Colour
- Shane Sewell (born 1972), Canadian professional wrestler, ring name Glamour Boy Shane
- Val Venis (born 1971), Canadian professional wrestler, ring name Glamour Boy Sean
- An all-male Nollywood movie directed by Jeta Amata, inspired by Glamour Girls

== See also ==
- "Glamour Boy", a 1973 song by The Guess Who
- Glamour Boy (film), a 1941 American comedy
- Glamour (disambiguation)
