= David Benatar =

South African philosopher (born 1966)

- Born: 1966 (age 59–60); South Africa
- Occupations: Academic, professor, writer
- Known for: Antinatalism

Academic background
- Education: University of Cape Town (BSocSc, PhD)

Academic work
- Discipline: Philosophy
- Sub-discipline: Moral and social philosophy; applied ethics; philosophy of law; philosophy of religion
- Institutions: University of Cape Town
- Notable works: Better Never to Have Been (2006)
- Notable ideas: Benatar's asymmetry argument

David Benatar (/ˈbɛnətɑːr/; born 1966) is a South African philosopher, academic, and author. He is best known for his work in moral philosophy and for advancing the position of antinatalism, the view that coming into existence is a serious harm. He is the author of Better Never to Have Been: The Harm of Coming into Existence (2006), in which he argues that procreation is always morally wrong because it imposes harm by bringing sentient beings into existence. Central to this view is his asymmetry argument, which holds that the absence of pain is good even if no one benefits from it, while the absence of pleasure is not bad unless someone is deprived of it.

Benatar has also written on topics including death, ethics, human suffering, and gender discrimination. He is emeritus professor of philosophy at the University of Cape Town and a member of the editorial board of the Journal of Controversial Ideas.

== Education and career ==
Benatar is the son of Solomon Benatar, a global-health expert who founded the Bioethics Centre at the University of Cape Town. He studied at the University of Cape Town, receiving a BSocSc and PhD.

Benatar is emeritus professor of philosophy at the University of Cape Town. He is a member of the editorial board of the Journal of Controversial Ideas.

== Philosophical work ==
=== Asymmetry between pain and pleasure ===
Benatar argues there is a crucial asymmetry between the good and the bad things, such as pleasure and pain, which means it would be better for humans not to have been born:

1. The presence of pain is bad.
2. The presence of pleasure is good.
3. The absence of pain is good, even if that good is not enjoyed by anyone.
4. The absence of pleasure is not bad unless there is somebody for whom this absence is a deprivation.

Scenario A (X exists)	Scenario B (X never exists)
1. Presence of pain (Bad)	3. Absence of pain (Good)
2. Presence of pleasure (Good)	4. Absence of pleasure (Not bad)

==== Implications for procreation ====
Benatar argues that bringing someone into existence generates both good and bad experiences, pain and pleasure, whereas not doing so generates neither pain nor pleasure. The absence of pain is good, while the absence of pleasure is not bad. Therefore, the ethical choice is weighed in favor of non-procreation.

Benatar raises four other related asymmetries that he considers quite plausible:

1. We have a moral obligation not to create unhappy people and we have no moral obligation to create happy people. The reason why we think there is a moral obligation not to create unhappy people is that the presence of this suffering would be bad (for the sufferers) and the absence of the suffering is good (even though there is nobody to enjoy the absence of suffering). By contrast, the reason we think there is no moral obligation to create happy people is that although their pleasure would be good for them, the absence of pleasure when they do not come into existence will not be bad, because there will be no one who will be deprived of this good.
2. It is strange to mention the interests of a potential child as a reason why we decide to create them, and it is not strange to mention the interests of a potential child as a reason why we decide not to create them. That the child may be happy is not a morally important reason to create them. By contrast, that the child may be unhappy is an important moral reason not to create them. If it were the case that the absence of pleasure is bad even if someone does not exist to experience its absence, then we would have a significant moral reason to create a child and to create as many children as possible. And if it were not the case that the absence of pain is good even if someone does not exist to experience this good, then we would not have a significant moral reason not to create a child.
3. Someday we can feel regret for the sake of a person whose existence was conditional on our decision, that we created them – a person can be unhappy and the presence of their pain would be a bad thing. But we will never feel regret for the sake of a person whose existence was conditional on our decision, that we did not create them – a person will not be deprived of happiness, because he or she will never exist, and the absence of happiness will not be bad, because there will be no one who will be deprived of this good.
4. We feel sadness by the fact that somewhere people come into existence and suffer, and we feel no sadness by the fact that somewhere people did not come into existence in a place where there are happy people. When we know that somewhere people came into existence and suffer, we feel compassion. The fact that on some deserted island or planet, people did not come into existence and suffer is good. This is because the absence of pain is good even when there is not someone who is experiencing this good. On the other hand, we do not feel sadness by the fact that on some deserted island or planet, people did not come into existence and are not happy. This is because the absence of pleasure is bad only when someone exists to be deprived of this good.

=== Humans' unreliable assessment of life's quality ===
Benatar raises the issue of whether humans inaccurately estimate the true quality of their lives, and has cited three psychological phenomena which he believes are responsible for this:

1. Tendency towards optimism: we have a positively distorted perspective of our lives in the past, present, and future.
2. Adaptation: we adapt to our circumstances, and if they worsen, our sense of well-being is lowered in anticipation of those harmful circumstances, according to our expectations, which are usually divorced from the reality of our circumstances.
3. Comparison: we judge our lives by comparing them to those of others, ignoring the negatives which affect everyone to focus on specific differences. And due to our optimism bias, we mostly compare ourselves to those worse off, to overestimate the value of our own well-being.

He concludes:

The above psychological phenomena are unsurprising from an evolutionary perspective. They militate against suicide and in favour of reproduction. If our lives are quite as bad as I shall still suggest they are, and if people were prone to see this true quality of their lives for what it is, they might be much more inclined to kill themselves, or at least not to produce more such lives. Pessimism, then, tends not to be naturally selected.

=== Badness of death ===
In The Human Predicament (2017), Benatar presents three arguments for why death can be regarded as bad. The first focuses on the suffering commonly associated with dying, which often involves physical pain and emotional distress for both the individual and those close to them. The second, known as the "deprivation account", holds that death is harmful because it deprives individuals of future experiences, including potential pleasures and achievements, regardless of whether their life as a whole is positive or negative. The third argument considers death bad in itself, as it results in the complete and irreversible annihilation of the self, ending psychological continuity and biographical identity. Benatar suggests that these considerations can justify a rational fear of death, independent of cultural or religious attitudes toward mortality.

=== Discrimination against men and boys ===
Benatar's book The Second Sexism: Discrimination Against Men and Boys (2012) examines various issues regarding misandry and the negative socially imposed aspects of male identity. It does not seek to attack or diminish the ideas of feminism, but rather to shine a light on the parallel existence of systemic and cultural discrimination against men and boys. In a review of the book, philosopher Simon Blackburn writes that "Benatar knows that such examples are likely to meet snorts of disbelief or derision, but he is careful to back up his claims with empirical data," and through this book, he shows that "if it is all too often tough being a woman, it is also sometimes tough being a man, and that any failure to recognise this risks distorting what should be everyone's goal, namely universal sympathy as well as social justice for all, regardless of gender." In another review, the philosopher Iddo Landau praises the work as "a very well-argued book that presents an unorthodox thesis and defends it ably," agreeing with Benatar that "in order to cope with the hitherto ignored second sexism, we should not only acknowledge it, but also dedicate much more empirical and philosophical research to this under-explored topic and, of course, try to change many attitudes, social norms, and laws".

== Publications ==
Benatar is the author of a series of widely cited papers in medical ethics, including a paper on circumcision "Between Prophylaxis and Child Abuse" (The American Journal of Bioethics) and "A Pain in the Fetus: Toward Ending Confusion about Fetal Pain" (Bioethics), both co-authored with Michael Benatar. His work has been published in journals including Ethics, Journal of Applied Philosophy, Social Theory and Practice, American Philosophical Quarterly, QJM: An International Journal of Medicine, Journal of Law and Religion and the British Medical Journal.

== Cultural influence ==
Nic Pizzolatto, creator and writer of True Detective, has cited Benatar's Better Never to Have Been as an influence on the TV series (along with Ray Brassier's Nihil Unbound, Thomas Ligotti's The Conspiracy Against the Human Race, Jim Crawford's Confessions of an Antinatalist, and Eugene Thacker's In the Dust of This Planet).

== Personal life ==
Benatar is known for maintaining a high level of personal privacy, and little is publicly known about his private life. He has held antinatalist views since his childhood. He has stated that he does not have children.

Benatar is vegan, and has taken part in debates on veganism. He has argued that humans are "responsible for the suffering and deaths of billions of other humans and non-human animals. If that level of destruction were caused by another species we would rapidly recommend that new members of that species not be brought into existence." He has also argued that the outbreak of zoonotic diseases, such as the COVID-19 pandemic, is often the result of how humans mistreat animals.

Benatar is an atheist and is ethnically Jewish. He has expressed concern about what he views as a hostile environment toward Jews at institutions such as the University of Cape Town, attributing this to elements of what he describes as the "regressive left". He has also expressed criticism of South Africans who have shown support for Hamas, including Ronnie Kasrils.

== Bibliography ==
- Benatar, David (2006). Better Never to Have Been: The Harm of Coming into Existence. Oxford University Press. ISBN 978-0-19-929642-2.
- Benatar, David (2012). The Second Sexism: Discrimination Against Men and Boys. John Wiley & Sons. ISBN 978-0-470-67451-2.
- Benatar, David (2015). "The Misanthropic Argument for Anti-natalism". In S. Hannan; S. Brennan; R. Vernon (eds.). Permissible Progeny?: The Morality of Procreation and Parenting. Oxford University Press. pp. 34–64. doi:10.1093/acprof:oso/9780199378111.003.0002. ISBN 978-0-19-937814-2.
- Benatar, David; Wasserman, David (2015). Debating Procreation: Is It Wrong to Reproduce?. Oxford University Press. ISBN 978-0-19-027311-8.
- Benatar, David (2017). The Human Predicament: A Candid Guide to Life's Biggest Questions. Oxford University Press. ISBN 978-0-19-063381-3.
- Benatar, David (2021). The Fall of the University of Cape Town: Africa's Leading University in Decline. Politicsweb Publishing. ISBN 978-3-9822364-2-1.
- Benatar, David (2024). Very Practical Ethics: Engaging Everyday Moral Questions. Oxford University Press. ISBN 978-0-19-778079-4.

=== As editor ===
- Benatar, David (2001). Ethics for Everyday. McGraw-Hill. ISBN 978-0-07-240889-8.
- Benatar, David, ed. (2004). Life, Death & Meaning: Key Philosophical Readings on the Big Questions.
- Benatar, David, ed. (2006). Cutting to the Core: Exploring the Ethics of Contested Surgeries. Rowman & Littlefield. ISBN 978-0-7425-5001-8.
- Archard, David; Benatar, David (2016). Procreation and Parenthood: The Ethics of Bearing and Rearing Children. Oxford University Press. ISBN 978-0-19-874815-1.
