= Tønnessen =

Tønnessen is a surname. Notable people with the surname include:

- Anne Tønnessen (born 1974), Norwegian footballer
- Herman Tønnessen (1918–2001), Norwegian–Canadian philosopher and writer
- Johan Nicolay Tønnessen (1901–1987), Norwegian historian and schoolteacher
