= The Last Messiah =

Essay by Norwegian philosopher Peter Wessel Zapffe

"The Last Messiah" (Norwegian: "Den sidste Messias") is a 1933 essay by the Norwegian philosopher Peter Wessel Zapffe. One of his most significant works, this approximately 10-page-long essay would later be expanded upon in Zapffe's book On the Tragic, and, as a theory, describes a reinterpretation of Friedrich Nietzsche's Übermensch. Zapffe believed that existential crisis or angst in humanity was the result of an overly evolved intellect, and that people overcome this by "artificially limiting the content of consciousness".

== The human condition ==
Zapffe views the human condition as tragically overdeveloped, calling it "a biological paradox, an abomination, an absurdity, an exaggeration of disastrous nature". Zapffe viewed the world as beyond humanity's need for meaning, unable to provide any of the answers to the fundamental existential questions.

The tragedy of a species becoming unfit for life by over-evolving one ability is not confined to humankind. Thus it is thought, for instance, that certain deer in paleontological times succumbed as they acquired overly-heavy horns. The mutations must be considered blind, they work, are thrown forth, without any contact of interest with their environment. In depressive states, the mind may be seen in the image of such an antler, in all its fantastic splendour pinning its bearer to the ground.

— Peter Wessel Zapffe, "The Last Messiah"

After placing the source of anguish in human intellect, Zapffe then sought as to why humanity simply didn't just perish. He concluded humanity "performs, to extend a settled phrase, a more or less self-conscious repression of its damaging surplus of consciousness", and that this was "a requirement of social adaptability and of everything commonly referred to as healthy and normal living". He provided four defined mechanisms of defense that allowed an individual to overcome their burden of intellect.

== Remedies against panic ==
- Isolation is the first method Zapffe noted. It is defined as "a fully arbitrary dismissal from consciousness of all disturbing and destructive thought and feeling". He cites "one should not think, it is just confusing" as an example.
- Anchoring, according to Zapffe, is the "fixation of points within, or construction of walls around, the liquid fray of consciousness". The anchoring mechanism provides individuals a value or an ideal that allows them to focus their attentions in a consistent manner. Zapffe compared this mechanism to Norwegian playwright Henrik Ibsen's concept of the life-lie from the play The Wild Duck, where the family has achieved a tolerable modus vivendi by ignoring the skeletons and by permitting each member to live in a dreamworld of his own. Zapffe also applied the anchoring principle to society, and stated "God, the Church, the State, morality, fate, the laws of life, the people, the future" are all examples of collective primary anchoring firmaments. He noted flaws in the principle's ability to properly address the human condition, and warned against the despair provoked resulting from discovering one's anchoring mechanism was false. Another shortcoming of anchoring is conflict between contradicting anchoring mechanisms, which Zapffe posits will bring one to destructive nihilism.
- Distraction is when "one limits attention to the critical bounds by constantly enthralling it with impressions". Distraction focuses all of one's energy on a task or idea to prevent the mind from turning in on itself.
- Sublimation is the refocusing of energy away from negative outlets toward positive ones.

Through stylistic or artistic gifts can the very pain of living at times be converted into valuable experiences. Positive impulses engage the evil and put it to their own ends, fastening onto its pictorial, dramatic, heroic, lyric or even comic aspects.... To write a tragedy, one must to some extent free oneself from—betray—the very feeling of tragedy and regard it from an outer, e.g. aesthetic, point of view. Here is, by the way, an opportunity for the wildest round-dancing through ever higher ironic levels, into a most embarrassing circulus vitiosus. Here one can chase one's ego across numerous habitats, enjoying the capacity of the various layers of consciousness to dispel one another. The present essay is a typical attempt at sublimation. The author does not suffer, he is filling pages and is going to be published in a journal.

— Peter Wessel Zapffe, "The Last Messiah"

== The last messiah ==
Zapffe concluded that "as long as humankind recklessly proceeds in the fateful delusion of being biologically fated for triumph, nothing essential will change". Humankind will get increasingly desperate until "the last messiah" arrives, "the man who, as the first of all, has dared strip his soul naked and submit it alive to the outmost thought of the lineage, the very idea of doom. A man who has fathomed life and its cosmic ground, and whose pain is the Earth's collective pain". Zapffe compares his messiah to Moses, but ultimately rejects the precept to "be fruitful, and multiply, and replenish the earth", by saying "know yourselves – be infertile, and let the earth be silent after ye". His message was rejected, "they will fall upon him, with midwives and wet nurses at their head, and they will bury him under their fingernails".

In Vladimir Odoyevsky's Russian Nights (1840), there was a story titled "The Last Suicide", with a similar ending, where "[T]hen, at last he came, the Messiah of despair! His look was cold, his voice was loud, and his words dispersed the last remnants of ancient beliefs." However, unlike in Zapffe's story, the last Messiah's message was accepted by humanity, which proceeded to explode the entire earth.

== Influence ==
In his book The Conspiracy Against the Human Race, horror writer and philosopher Thomas Ligotti refers frequently to The Last Messiah and quotes sections of the essay, using Zapffe's work as an example of philosophical pessimism.

== See also ==
- Antinatalism
- Nihilism
- Philosophical pessimism
