= Glam =

Glam is a shortened form of the word glamour.

Glam or GLAM may also refer to:

== Film ==
- Glam (film), a 1997 experimental drama film

== Institutions ==
- University of Glamorgan, founded in 1913 and merged into the University of South Wales in 2013.
- GLAM (cultural heritage), c.1990s, an acronym for galleries, libraries, archives, and museums, the cultural heritage institutions
- Glam Media, former name, until 2014, of American company Mode Media

== People ==
- Moshe Glam (born 1970), Israeli footballer and football manager
- Rami Glam (born 1978), former Israeli footballer
- Glamourina (born 1988), Polish fashion stylist

== Places ==
- Short form of Glamorgan a historic county of Wales and formerly used as a postal abbreviation.

== Mathematics ==
- Generalized linear array model, 2006, in statistics

== Music ==
- Glam metal, 1970s, a subgenre of heavy metal music
- Glam rock, 1970s, a style of rock and pop music
- Glam punk, 1970s, a genre that mixes elements of glam rock with protopunk or punk rock

=== Albums ===
- Glam (album), 1998, by Mouse on Mars

=== Bands ===
- Glam (band), 2010, a South Korean girl group

=== Songs ===
- "Glam", a 1982 instrumental by Icehouse from Primitive Man
- "Glam 25", a 1999 song by Zombie Nation from Leichenschmaus
- "Glam", a 2010 song by Christina Aguilera from Bionic
- "Glam", a 2014 song by Chuck Inglish from Convertibles

== Sport ==
- Glamorgan Cricket Club, 1888, first-class county club representing Glamorgan, abbreviated as Glam
- Glamorgan Wanderers, 1893, Rugby union team in the county of Glamorgan

== See also ==
- Glamorgan
- Glamorous (disambiguation)
- Glamour (disambiguation)
