= Grimscribe: His Lives and Works =

1991 short stories by Thomas Ligotti

- First edition (US)
- Author: Thomas Ligotti
- Language: English
- Genre: Horror fiction, Weird fiction, Speculative fiction
- Publisher: Carroll & Graf (US); Robinson (UK)
- Publication date: 1991
- Publication place: United States
- Media type: Print
- Pages: 214
- ISBN: 978-0881847390

Grimscribe: His Lives and Works is a 1991 collection of short stories in the horror genre by American author Thomas Ligotti. The book was Ligotti's second short story collection to be published, following Songs of a Dead Dreamer. In 2015, Penguin Classics republished Songs of a Dead Dreamer and Grimscribe together in one volume, making Ligotti one of just 10 living authors to be published by the imprint.

== Critical reception ==
In his foreword to the Penguin Classics edition, fellow weird fiction writer Jeff VanderMeer called the collection "the work of one of our greatest dark imaginations," saying that “Grimscribe was, at the time of publication, seen by some as a typical second book, as if Ligotti had taken a step back in quality. Over time, however, readers and critics have recognized that the collection is, if anything, richer, more focused, and more mature than Songs.”

In his review for The Guardian, Scott Bradfield said that Ligotti's stories, "like those of Poe and Nabokov, the cruel, brilliant, manipulative writers he most resembles – are absorbingly constructed little works of art."

== Contents ==
1. The Voice of the Damned

- "The Last Feast of Harlequin"
- "The Spectacles in the Drawer"
- "Flowers of the Abyss"
- "Nethescurial"

2. The Voice of the Demon

- "The Dreaming in Nortown"
- "The Mystics of Muelenburg"
- "In the Shadow of Another World"
- "The Cocoons"

3. The Voice of the Dreamer

- "The Night School"
- "The Glamour"

4. The Voice of the Child

- "The Library of Byzantium"
- "Miss Plarr"

5. The Voice of Our Name

- "The Shadow at the Bottom of the World"
