= The Conspiracy Against the Human Race =

2010 book by Thomas Ligotti

- Author: Thomas Ligotti
- Language: English
- Subjects: Antinatalism, philosophical pessimism
- Genre: Non-fiction
- Publisher: Viking Press
- Publication date: 2010
- Publication place: United States
- Pages: 245
- ISBN: 9780982429693

The Conspiracy Against the Human Race: A Contrivance of Horror is a 2010 non-fiction book by American author Thomas Ligotti.

Better known as a horror fiction author, with Conspiracy Ligotti offers a series of essays on his philosophical pessimism, nihilist and antinatalist views. Among other sources, Ligotti cites Peter Wessel Zapffe's essay "The Last Messiah" and the writings of Emil Cioran (1911–1995) and Philipp Mainländer (1841–1876) as inspirations for his philosophical outlook. The book is noted for its repeated usage of the phrase "malignantly useless," as well as for the manner "in which philosophical thought and literary analysis converge" in his writings. In 2018, the book was re-released, with a new preface.

== Summary ==
Ligotti assumes a pessimistic outlook from the outset of the book. Taking as a starting assumption the premise that "being alive is not all right," or that in general suffering outweighs pleasure, he argues that the existence of consciousness entails a tragedy: The more conscious one is of the meaningless and often horrifying nature of the world (which is referred to as being "malignantly useless"), the more one wishes not to be aware of this fact, and so overly conscious beings must constantly engage in exercises which limit their awareness of the negative aspects of existence, either intentionally or instinctively. This makes consciousness something that "should not be," and humanity's attempts at either coping with, ignoring, or actively suppressing this fact drive a significant portion of modern society's obsessions, such as the quest for healthy living (despite the fact that everyone dies regardless), art and horror (as acts of sublimation), and the desire to have children (as a futile attempt at a form of genetic immortality), among many other common behavioral norms. Ligotti argues that the only complete escape from the predicament of consciousness is either to undergo ego death, which very few humans successfully achieve, or for humanity to cease existing, preferably through voluntary human extinction (which Ligotti believes is highly unlikely to ever happen), but which may also be achieved on an individual level through death, although that may entail further suffering in the process, and is therefore not always worth the increased pain.

Ligotti posits that very few people would be willing to be born in the past (due in part to the inevitable increased suffering of inferior medical care), but that very few people feel bad about being alive in the present, despite the strong possibility that future generations will feel the same about us that we feel towards the past (that their lives were filled with more suffering than we would be willing to bear). Philosophical pessimism is not held or even widely considered by most humans, which, according to Ligotti, is because of its terrifying implications rather than the strength of the arguments for or against it.

This is the tragedy: Consciousness has forced us into the paradoxical position of striving to be unselfconscious of what we are—hunks of spoiling flesh on disintegrating bones.

— Ligotti, The Conspiracy Against The Human race, p. 11

== Reception ==
W. Scott Poole of PopMatters praised Conspiracy's "astonishing range", saying that "Ligotti takes us on a tour of both philosophy and literature that manages to include Schopenhauer, Ann Radcliffe, Thomas De Quincey, H.P. Lovecraft, and Poe. This is no simple ornamental display of learning and range; Ligotti has insights into each of these figures that cut like a razor." Poole went on to call The Conspiracy Against the Human Race one of the best books of the year.

Mark Fisher described Conspiracy as "amateur philosophy in the best possible sense, driven by a metaphysical hunger that is so often lacking in the work of professional philosophers."

The book was nominated for the 2010 Bram Stoker Award for Best Non-Fiction.

=== Impact on True Detective ===
In 2014, the HBO television series True Detective attracted attention from some of Ligotti's fans because of the striking resemblance between the pessimistic philosophy espoused in the first few episodes by protagonist Rust Cohle (played by Matthew McConaughey) and Ligotti's writings in The Conspiracy Against the Human Race, leading to accusations that dialogue from Cohle's character in True Detective were plagiarised from The Conspiracy Against the Human Race. The series' writer, Nic Pizzolatto, confirmed in The Wall Street Journal that Ligotti, along with several other writers and texts in the supernatural horror genre, had indeed influenced him. Pizzolatto said he found The Conspiracy Against the Human Race to be "incredibly powerful writing". On the topic of hard-boiled detectives, he asked: "What could be more hardboiled than the worldview of Ligotti or [Emil] Cioran?" The attention from True Detective resulted in increased sales for The Conspiracy Against the Human Race, to the point that it began to outsell Atlas Shrugged.
