= Biosophy =

Wisdom of life

Biosophy, meaning wisdom of life, is "the science and art of intelligent living based on the awareness and practice of spiritual values, ethical-social principles and character qualities essential to individual freedom and social harmony". It stands in relation to biology, which can be broadly described as the understanding of life.

== History ==
The term Biosophy was probably first used in 1806 by Ignaz Paul Vitalis Troxler, a Swiss philosopher whose early works followed F. W. J. Schelling. It was later used by other philosophers like Peter Wessel Zapffe (1899–1990), who used biology as the foundation of his philosophy. Zapffe first set out his ideas in Den sidste Messias (en. The Last Messiah) (1933). Later Zapffe gave a more systematic defence in his philosophical treatise Om det tragiske (en. On the Tragic) (1941). The Biosophical Institute claims that Frederick Kettner (1886-1957) was the founder of Biosophy. Kettner was himself originally inspired by the organicism of Constantin Brunner.

Contemporary biosophers include Jong Bhak, who defines Biosophy as a "new way of performing philosophy generated from scientific and biological awareness". Bhak developed his theory of Biosophy while studying at Cambridge University in 1995 and afterwards. The main difference of Bhak's biosophy from other philosophy is that his biosophy is a computable philosophy. It borrows Bertrand Russell logicism and extends it to a computational set of ideas and knowledge. One ultimate aim of biosophy is to construct a logical thinking machine that can do philosophy for human beings.

== Biosophy Program ==
The Biosophy Program was presented on the internet by Anna Öhman and Svenolov Lindgren in January 1998. They noted that "the term biosophy was previously used by Zapffe (1941) in a literary context for the analysis of human social life based on philosophy of existence and biological facts. Such a narrow circumscription of biosophy is in our opinion no obstacle to widen the definition to encompass all systematic thinking on biological issues."

The Biosophy Program was intended to circumscribe and systemize biological studies in a philosophical framework to support teaching at courses on philosophy and courses on biology. The biosophical thinking is defined by Öhman and Lindgren in five philosophical fields and discriminated from Næss’ ecosophy.

== Objectives ==
- To create biosophical groups for character and peace education where the individual has opportunities of self-improvement.
- To encourage integration among individuals based on their mutual interest in a spiritual purpose in life.
- To network with other groups and organizations interested in character and peace education working cooperatively with them.
- To replace the blind acceptance of theological beliefs, superstitions and dogmas with the cultivation of spiritual intelligence as the basis for the Religion of Freedom and Friendship.
- To create a world-fellowship of peace-loving human beings who have overcome religious, national, racial and social prejudices who can work creatively for the growth of democracy, spiritual personal growth and world peace.
- To work for the synthesis of religion, philosophy, science, education and art.
- To perpetuate and advance Kettner's principles and work for the development and cultivation of the character and peace nature in young people.
- To create a Peace Department in national governments headed by a Secretary of Peace, and to establish peace universities.
- To establish a world-fellowship of thinking human beings who can work creatively for the growth of spiritual democracy and world peace.
- To cooperate in the advancement of humanity from civilization to the age of "soulization".

== See also ==
- List of new religious movements
- Bioinformatics
- Biophysics
- Computational philosophy
- New Age
