= Better Never to Have Been =

2006 book by David Benatar

- First edition cover
- Author: David Benatar
- Language: English
- Subject: Antinatalism; philosophical pessimism
- Genre: Philosophy
- Publisher: Oxford University Press
- Publication date: 2006
- Publication place: United Kingdom
- Media type: Paperback; ebook; audiobook
- Pages: xi + 237
- ISBN: 978-0-199-29642-2
- OCLC: 427507306

Better Never to Have Been: The Harm of Coming into Existence is a 2006 book by South African philosopher David Benatar, in which he argues for antinatalism, the philosophical position that coming into existence is always a harm. Benatar defends this view primarily through two arguments: the asymmetry argument, which holds that the absence of pain is good even when not experienced, while the absence of pleasure is not bad unless someone is deprived of it; and an argument from philosophical pessimism, which asserts that due to cognitive biases, human beings systematically underestimate the negative aspects of life.

The book expands on ideas first presented in Benatar's 1997 paper "Why It Is Better Never to Come into Existence", and has received both praise and criticism from philosophers and ethicists. It has also influenced cultural works, most notably the television series True Detective.

== Background ==
The book builds upon arguments first developed in Benatar's 1997 paper "Why It Is Better Never to Come into Existence", in which he introduced the key concepts that would later form the foundation of his antinatalist philosophy.

== Summary ==
Better Never to Have Been directly addresses Benatar's antinatalist philosophy, which asserts that sentient beings are harmed by being brought into existence, making procreation morally wrong. He reaches this conclusion through two main arguments: an asymmetry between good and bad things, such as pleasure and pain, and the view that human beings have an unreliable assessment of life's quality.

=== Asymmetry between pleasure and pain ===
Benatar argues that there is an asymmetry between good and bad things, such as pleasure and pain:

1. The absence of pain is good, even if that good is not enjoyed by anyone, whereas
2. The absence of pleasure is not bad unless there is somebody for whom this absence is a deprivation.

According to Benatar, the absence of pleasure is only considered bad if someone exists to experience this deprivation. When no one exists, the absence of pleasure does not carry negative value.

On the subject of childlessness, Benatar writes that "the reason why we do not lament our failure to bring somebody into existence is because absent pleasures are not bad."

He further contends that the asymmetry between pleasure and pain is both quantitative and qualitative. Benatar argues that there is more pain than pleasure in an average human life, and that people instinctively treat pain and pleasure as distinct categories, rather than comparable experiences. He illustrates this with an example: if offered the choice to endure extreme pain for an hour in exchange for sublime pleasure for the rest of the day, most people would reject the trade.

=== Cognitive biases and life's quality ===
Benatar argues that individuals tend to overestimate the quality of their lives due to a range of cognitive biases, many of which he considers to be evolutionarily ingrained. He cites the optimism bias, the tendency to recall positive experiences more readily than negative ones, and the common belief that one's quality of life is above average. According to Benatar, such biases lead people to underestimate the extent of suffering in life, including widespread experiences such as illness, death, and chronic pain. He also argues that people often adapt to negative circumstances by adjusting their baseline for wellbeing, which may obscure the actual level of harm experienced. Benatar presents this as part of a broader philosophical pessimism, which holds that life may be objectively worse than it is commonly perceived to be, and that subjective evaluations of life's quality are not reliable grounds for assessing its worth.

== Critical reception ==
In his review, philosopher Yujin Nagasawa questions why Benatar framed Better Never to Have Been as a positive thesis rather than as a counter-intuitive philosophical puzzle. As a result, he states that he cannot recommend the book to a general audience.

Bioethicist David DeGrazia published a rebuttal to Benatar's arguments in 2010; although he disagrees with Benatar's conclusions, he praises the book for its intellectual rigor and philosophical engagement"

In 2013, Benatar responded to critics of the book in the paper "Still Better Never to Have Been: A Reply to (More of) My Critics".

== Publication history ==
Better Never to Have Been was published on 12 October 2006 by Oxford University Press. The book has been translated into Czech, Japanese, Turkish, Italian, Korean, Polish, and Chinese. An audiobook version narrated by Dennis Kleinman was published on 24 January 2023 by Tantor Media.

== In popular culture ==
The creator of True Detective, Nic Pizzolatto, has cited Better Never to Have Been as an influence on the creation of the character Rust Cohle.
