= Benatar's asymmetry argument =

Argument for the negative view on procreation

Benatar's asymmetry argument for antinatalism is an argument based on the difference between harms and benefits viewed in two scenarios — when the person in question exists and when the person in question never exists. The argument, introduced by David Benatar in his 2006 book, Better Never to Have Been: The Harm of Coming into Existence, aims to establish that coming into existence is always a harm for the one who's coming into the world.

== The argument ==
David Benatar argues that there is a crucial asymmetry between the good and the bad things, such as pleasure and pain:

1. the presence of pain is bad.
2. the presence of pleasure is good.
3. the absence of pain is good, even if that good is not enjoyed by anyone.
4. the absence of pleasure is not bad unless there is somebody for whom this absence is a deprivation.

Scenario A (X exists)	Scenario B (X never exists)
1. Presence of pain (Bad)	3. Absence of pain (Good)
2. Presence of pleasure (Good)	4. Absence of pleasure (Not bad)

Regarding procreation, the argument follows that coming into existence generates both good and bad experiences, such as pain and pleasure, whereas not coming into existence entails neither pain nor pleasure. The absence of pain is good, while the absence of pleasure is not bad. Therefore, the ethical choice is weighed in favor of non-procreation.

=== Supporting basic asymmetries ===
Benatar explains the main asymmetry using four other asymmetries that he considers quite plausible:

- The asymmetry of procreational duties: we have a moral obligation not to create unhappy people and we have no moral obligation to create happy people. The reason why we think there is a moral obligation not to create unhappy people is that the presence of this suffering would be bad (for the sufferers) and the absence of the suffering is good (even though there is nobody to enjoy the absence of suffering). By contrast, the reason we think there is no moral obligation to create happy people is that although their pleasure would be good for them, the absence of pleasure when they do not come into existence will not be bad, because there will be no one who will be deprived of this good.
- The prospective beneficence asymmetry: it is strange to mention the interests of a potential child as a reason why we decide to create them, and it is not strange to mention the interests of a potential child as a reason why we decide not to create them. That the child may be happy is not a morally important reason to create them. By contrast, that the child may be unhappy is an important moral reason not to create them. If it were the case that the absence of pleasure is bad even if someone does not exist to experience its absence, then we would have a significant moral reason to create a child and to create as many children as possible. And if it were not the case that the absence of pain is good even if someone does not exist to experience this good, then we would not have a significant moral reason not to create a child.
- The retrospective beneficence asymmetry: someday we can regret for the sake of a person whose existence was conditional on our decision, that we created them – a person can be unhappy and the presence of their pain would be a bad thing. But we will never feel regret for the sake of a person whose existence was conditional on our decision, that we did not create them – a person will not be deprived of happiness, because they will never exist, and the absence of happiness will not be bad, because there will be no one who will be deprived of this good.
- The asymmetry of distant suffering and absent happy people: we feel sadness by the fact that somewhere people come into existence and suffer, and we feel no sadness by the fact that somewhere people did not come into existence in a place where there are happy people. When we know that somewhere people came into existence and suffer, we feel compassion. The fact that on some deserted island or planet people did not come into existence and suffer is good. This is because the absence of pain is good even when there is not someone who is experiencing this good. On the other hand, we do not feel sadness by the fact that on some deserted island or planet people did not come into existence and are not happy. This is because the absence of pleasure is bad only when someone exists to be deprived of this good.

== Criticism of the basic asymmetry ==
Benatar acknowledges that his basic asymmetry has been a primary target of criticism. One notable objection, which he addresses in his work, directly challenges the asymmetry: if the absence of pain is considered good (even for a non-existent person), then the absence of pleasure should symmetrically be considered bad, thereby rejecting point (4) of his framework. Critics cited by Benatar argue, for example, that it would "be bad, for the non-existent person we might have created, that his pleasure not occur, because it would have been good for him if it had occurred." Other critics argue that the asymmetry fails to account for the symmetrical value of absent pleasures and pains.

Benatar responds to this criticism by clarifying that his basic asymmetry is not a logical claim but an axiological one (i.e., concerning values). While it is logically possible to state that the absence of pleasures in Scenario B is bad (just as the absence of pains is good), he argues that we should not make this claim. One reason is that doing so would undermine the value judgments that his basic asymmetry seeks to explain. Benatar maintains that his asymmetry provides a coherent framework for understanding the ethical implications of existence and non-existence, and rejecting it would lead to inconsistencies in evaluating the four supporting basic asymmetries outlined in his argument.

== See also ==
- Asymmetry (population ethics)
- Philosophical pessimism
