= Herman Tønnessen =

Norwegian-Canadian philosopher (1918-2001)

Herman Tønnessen (24 July 1918 – 2001) was a Norwegian-Canadian philosopher and writer. Having studied with Arne Næss, in the years following the end of World War II he was affiliated with the Norwegian Institute for Social Research.

In 1957 he became a professor of philosophy at the University of California, Berkeley, a position he held until 1961, when he relocated to the University of Alberta.

His primary influences were the pessimistic ideals of German philosopher Arthur Schopenhauer and Norwegian biosophist Peter Wessel Zapffe.

In his essay Happiness Is for the Pigs: Philosophy versus Psychotherapy (1966), he formulated his attempt to "out-Zapffe Zapffe", in rejecting the former's metaphysical theory that life is meaningless. This idea is further elaborated in the book I Choose Truth (Jeg velger sannheten (1983)), a dialogue between Tønnessen and Zapffe in which they discuss the existential condition of humankind.

== Publications ==
- I Choose the Truth: a dialogue between Peter Wessel Zapffe and Herman Tønessen
- Happiness is for the Pigs: Philosophy vs Psychotherapy with Peter Wessel Zapffe and Arne Næss
