= Teatro Grottesco (book) =

2006 short story collection by Thomas Ligotti

- First edition
- Author: Thomas Ligotti
- Language: English
- Subject: Horror
- Genre: Fiction
- Publisher: Durtro Press
- Publication date: 2006
- Publication place: United States
- Media type: Print, e-book
- Pages: 331 pp. (1st edition)
- ISBN: 0978991176

Teatro Grottesco (Italian for Theatre of the Grotesque) is a collection of short stories by American horror author Thomas Ligotti. This is his fifth collection, containing tales written throughout his career. The book was first published in 2006 by Durtro Press as a limited edition hardcover: another hardcover edition was released on November 30, 2007 by Mythos Books, and a paperback edition was released on July 10, 2008 by Virgin Books.

== Contents ==
- Derangements
- Purity

A boy moves to a new neighborhood with his disturbed family and learns of his father's strange "principles".

- The Town Manager

A small town descends into absurd insanity when a new "town manager" arrives.

- Sideshow, and Other Stories

A struggling author meets an older, wiser author and reads his strange works.

- The Clown Puppet

A man experiences consistent "visits" from a supernatural marionette.

- The Red Tower

The narrator tells of the history of a horrific factory.

- Deformations
- My Case for Retributive Action

A new employee uncovers a strange conspiracy at his office.

- Our Temporary Supervisor

In a small factory, a new, uncanny supervisor is sent by corporate.

- In a Foreign Town, In a Foreign Land

Various tales are told of the strange town from across the border.

- The Damaged and the Diseased
- Teatro Grottesco

Various members of the local art community discuss the arrival of the deranged "teatro".

- Gas Station Carnivals

An ill man discusses strange memories with an odd acquaintance.

- The Bungalow House

A librarian discovers an audiotape art-piece and becomes obsessed with meeting its creator.

- Severini

A man with many creative friends is pushed to meet the eccentric Severini.

- The Shadow, the Darkness

Many people are brought to the strange town of Crampton for reasons unknown.

== Review ==
Just flip through the book and you will see page after page of text with few paragraph indents. I am told my writing is unduly formal; at times Ligotti seems to be writing a reference book rather than a fictional story. But it all works for him as he weaves interesting, strange, and fantastic tales that are as sincere as they are bizarre and stories that captivate the reader and drag them off to a place they have never been. If you enjoy reading Lovecraft and Poe, you will most likely embrace Ligotti. If you prefer the streamline style of Dean Koontz, you may find Ligotti a bit overbearing. But try it out for yourself and make your own decision. Teatro Grottesco is a good place to start.

—Review by Parlor of Horror
