= My Work Is Not Yet Done =

Short story collection by Thomas Ligotti

- First edition
- Author: Thomas Ligotti
- Cover artist: Harry O. Morris
- Language: English
- Genre: horror, weird fiction
- Published: 2002, Mythos Books
- Publication place: United States of America
- Media type: Print (hardback and paperback)
- Pages: 192 pp (softcover)
- ISBN: 0753516888
- Preceded by: The Unholy City
- Followed by: Crampton: A Screenplay

My Work Is Not Yet Done is a horror novella by American author Thomas Ligotti. It is collected with two short stories, "I Have a Special Plan for This World" and "The Nightmare Network", and subtitled Three Tales of Corporate Horror.

The stories themselves have their own subtitles; respectively, "The Wages of Life", "The Second Coming of the Dead", and "Going Out of Business".

This subtitle indicates the shared theme of the stories: the modern corporate workplace and its effect on those who sustain it at the lower levels. The narrators of the first two stories are low-level employees of large corporations with inner-city offices.

== Stories ==
=== "My Work Is Not Yet Done" ===
Constantly afraid, Frank Dominio is a junior manager in a company which does not respect him. He's routinely called to meetings by what he calls "The Seven": seven other managers led by Richard, nicknamed "The Doctor" for dark and mysterious reasons that an employee could lose their job for enquiring about. Richard calls Dominio "Domino" in what the latter believes is a deliberate mistake made as a power play. The other managers are Barry, Harry, Mary, Perry, Sherry, and Kerrie, their similarities of name leading Dominio to think of them, Richard aside, as the Seven Dwarves.

When Dominio proposes a new product idea which could bring in a great deal of money, The Seven conspire to have him demoted then fired so they can steal it for themselves. A depressed Dominio visits a gun shop, planning to return to the company the next day and kill them one by one. However, as he's preparing for this, a strange, dark force operating within and behind the scenes of life envelops him, putting him in a psychic position between life and death, where he can spy on The Seven while using supernatural powers to craft ironic punishments for them.

=== "I Have a Special Plan for This World" ===
Blaine Company moves to a city once known as Murder Town for its high crime rate, but since a re-branding effort has been designated the Golden City. The city is permeated by a strange yellowish haze which may be responsible for some of the murders. Supervisors at the Blaine Company start falling victim to the murder rate until none are left, and a change in management style leads the story's narrator to reveal the dark secret at work in the company.

=== "The Nightmare Network" ===
This story is told in a series of classified ads, commercials, memos, private emails, journal entries, and segments of movie scripts, which chart the decline and fall of a major company, Oneiricon, once its ambitious, acquisitive nature has reached its apex, leaving nothing left to achieve in the corporate world. As a result, Oneiricon attempts one last hostile merger, with the so-called Nightmare Network which used to be its rival.

== Reception ==
My Work Is Not Yet Done won the Bram Stoker Award and International Horror Guild Award. S. T. Joshi, a scholar of H. P. Lovecraft and the weird fiction genre, said that the book "displays a Thomas Ligotti at the height of his form". Interzone said that "Ligotti is wonderfully original; he has a dark vision of a new and special kind, a vision that no one had before him", while The Times compared the author to H. P. Lovecraft, calling him "an accomplished conjuror of nightmares".

In Brandon Robshaw's brief review for The Independent, the book's prose was compared both favourably and unfavourably to Edgar Allan Poe's: "Parts of this are as creepy as Edgar Allan Poe. Unfortunately, the prose is also as ponderous as Edgar Allan Poe. Ligotti simply will not use one word where he can use lots of them."
