= The Shadow at the Bottom of the World =

Short story by Thomas Ligotti

"The Shadow at the Bottom of the World" is a horror short story by American writer Thomas Ligotti, first published in his 1991 collection Grimscribe: His Lives and Works.

== Plot summary ==
Told in the first person, from the perspective of an unnamed narrator, "The Shadow at the Bottom of the World" focuses on the inhabitants of a small village who encounter a mysterious black mass which appears to emanate from the bowels of the Earth. Soon after its arrival, odd droning noises reminiscent of the chattering of insects begin to fill the air, the weather becomes unnaturally warm, and the vegetation begins to exhibit strange, unearthly colors. Various inanimate objects, including a scarecrow, appear to come to life and move of their own accord, and even the human inhabitants begin to fall under its malevolent influence, spelling doom for any hapless travelers unfortunate enough to stumble upon the accursed place.
