= The Glamour (short story) =

Short story by Thomas Ligotti

"The Glamour" is a horror short story by American writer Thomas Ligotti, published in 1991 in his collection Grimscribe: His Lives and Works.

== Plot summary ==
The narrator, who has a habit of taking late-night walks and patronizing movie theaters, takes a stroll into a part of town that he has never visited before. During his wandering, he comes across a strange theater advertising a single feature known as "The Glamour". His curiosity piqued, he approaches the theater. The building is dilapidated and condemned, with the front doors boarded up and the marquee bearing the name of the feature badly damaged. However, he notices a light in an alleyway adjacent to the theater, revealing a side-entrance.

Upon entering, he realizes that the building is quite odd. The entire place radiates with a sinister glow of purples and pinks, eerily reminding the narrator of human organs. The walls, floors and ceiling are covered with cobwebs reminiscent of human hair, but the narrator is distracted when a man approaches him and informs that the theater is under new management and admission is free, before heading to the restroom without further explanation.

The narrator makes his way to the auditorium where The Glamour is to be shown, and after he sits down, feels a strange presence behind him, as though someone is watching him. He turns to look, but sees nothing, save the small film projection window. The auditorium is nearly empty except for a scant few other patrons, one of whom is seated close to the narrator and makes odd and cryptic remarks when asked about the supposed feature. The patron gleefully tells the narrator that there is no feature, but there is something. He also asks if the narrator knew that the theater had just come under new ownership. The narrator presses for more information but the showing begins. The screen displays silent scenes depicting some nightmarish other world, and the projection screen appears as disembodied eyes which are guiding the viewers on a tour of this strange world.

The images on screen then shift to depict the man the narrator had met in the lobby earlier, now naked and surrounded by a purple glow. The patron next to the narrator informs him that the “witch” has taken the man and is now inside of him. Soon after, the naked man appears to undergo some kind of surgery, his organs completely exposed while being operated on and fully conscious. The man reasserts some control over his body, but is only able to utter a silent scream to the audience. As this is happening the narrator hears a scream coming from another part of the theater. Disturbed, he questions the nearby patron about the film, but the patron is transfixed by the screen. Unable to shake him out of his stupor, the narrator rises from his chair just as the hair-like cobwebs come to life and attempt to restrain him to his seat. He breaks free from the hairs while the other patrons are consumed and as he is leaving he sees in the projection window the visage of an evil old woman with glowing eyes and monstrous hair, apparently the “new management" spoken of earlier.

Having exited the building, the narrator notices the lights of the theater have shut off and the marquee outside has been taken down, signaling that it was the final performance. As he leaves the neighborhood, passing by the shops, all of which have gone dark despite being lighted when he first passed them, the narrator can feel the presence of the old woman staring at him from behind their blackened windows.
