= Glamour (disambiguation) =

Glamour is the impression of attraction or fascination that a particularly luxurious or elegant appearance creates.

Glamour or Glamor may also refer to:

== Common uses ==
- Glamour photography, a genre of photography in which the subjects are portrayed in attractive poses ranging from fully clothed to nude
- Shapeshifting, the ability to physically transform oneself through unnatural means

== Film ==
- Glamour (1931 film), a British film
- Glamour (1934 film), an American film
- Glamour (2000 film), a Hungarian film

== Music ==
- Glamour (album), a 1988 album by Show-Ya
- The Glamour (album), a 1995 album by the Comsat Angels
- Glamour (band), an American girl band on the TV series The X Factor
- Glamour, a 1981 album by Dave Davies

== Literature ==
- The Glamour (novel), a 1984 novel by Christopher Priest
- "The Glamour" (short story), a 1991 short story by Thomas Ligotti

== Other uses ==
- Glamour (magazine), an American magazine
  - Glamour Awards, an annual set of awards hosted by Glamour magazine
- Glamor (software), a driver of the X.Org Server

== See also ==
- Glam (disambiguation)
- Glamorous (disambiguation)
