= Alan Pratt =

American philosopher

- Born: 1953 (age 72–73)

Philosophical work
- Era: 21st century Philosophy
- Region: Western philosophy
- School: Continental
- Main interests: existential nihilism

Alan R. Pratt (born 1953) is a professor of Humanities at Embry–Riddle University. He is known for his research on existential nihilism and meaning of life.

== Books ==
- Tales of Florida Fishes, Zane Grey's West Society, 2016 (contributing editor)
- The Critical Response to Andy Warhol, New York: Greenwood Press, 1997 (contributing editor)
- The Dark Side: Thoughts on the Futility of Life from the Ancient Greeks to the Present, New York: Citadel Press, 1994
- Black Humor: Critical Essays, New York: Garland Publishing, Inc., 1993 (contributing editor)

== See also ==
- nihilism
