= Nihilism (disambiguation) =

Nihilism is a philosophical doctrine suggesting the negation of one or more putatively meaningful aspects of life. It has several forms:

- Existential nihilism, the theory that life has no meaning
- Mereological nihilism, disbelief in objects with proper parts
- Metaphysical nihilism, the belief that there is a possible world in which there are no concrete objects at all
- Epistemological nihilism, disbelief in knowledge
- Moral nihilism, disbelief in objective moral facts
- Political nihilism, the rejection of the necessity of fundamental social or political structures

Nihilism may also refer to:

- Russian nihilist movement, a cultural and philosophical movement in Russia from the late 19th century
- "Nihilism", a song by Rancid from their 1994 album Let's Go
- Nihilism (collection), a fashion collection by Alexander McQueen
- Nihilistic violent extremism, a law enforcement term used to describe extremism and violence motivated by nihilism and misanthropy rather than an ideology
