= On the Tragic =

Philosophical book by Peter Wessel Zapffe

On the Tragic (Norwegian: Om det tragiske) is a philosophical work by Norwegian philosopher and writer Peter Wessel Zapffe, first published in 1941 as part of his doctoral thesis. The book investigates the concept of the tragic in human existence, analyzing it through the lenses of biology, psychology, and philosophy. It is considered one of Zapffe's most important works and a significant contribution to philosophical pessimism.

== Overview ==
On the Tragic is a philosophical work by Peter Wessel Zapffe that explores tragedy not as a literary genre, but as a biological and existential condition. Drawing on biology, psychology, and existential philosophy, Zapffe argues that humans possess an overdeveloped consciousness that renders them maladapted to life, generating internal contradictions and existential tension.

The book outlines how tragedy arises when an individual's core interests—such as survival, identity, or meaning—come into irreconcilable conflict. Zapffe distinguishes between heterotelic interests (oriented toward external goals) and autotelic interests (internally motivated), and classifies human behavior by levels of conscious control. When these forces clash without resolution, the result is the tragic condition.

Zapffe identifies a number of coping strategies—such as religious faith, distraction, that help humans avoid or contain existential despair. However, he maintains that these are psychological surrogates that obscure rather than resolve the fundamental contradiction of human existence.

The book draws on mythological and literary figures—Prometheus, Job, Antigone, and Faust—to illustrate how tragic tension is expressed symbolically in culture. In its final chapters, Zapffe advocates for a form of existential integrity: to acknowledge the tragic condition without illusion and to live in accordance with self-chosen values. The "tragic hero", for Zapffe, is one who transforms suffering into meaning through conscious resistance, even in the face of inevitable defeat.

== Philosophical position ==
The final chapters of the book advocate a sober acceptance of the tragic condition. Zapffe suggests that true dignity lies in recognizing the impossibility of resolving existential contradictions, yet choosing to act in accordance with autotelic values. This position culminates in the idea of the "tragic hero", who aligns his life with ideals even unto death — an act of resistance that transforms suffering into meaning.

== Reception ==
On the Tragic was well received in academic circles in Norway but long remained untranslated. It gained renewed interest due to growing engagement with existentialist and pessimistic thought in the 21st century. Norwegian literary historian Jan-Erik Ebbestad Hansen has described the book as "a cornerstone of modern Norwegian philosophy".

In his biography Naken under kosmos (1999), Norwegian scholar Jørgen Haave provides detailed historical context on Zapffe's life and philosophical development, drawing from personal diaries and previously unpublished materials.

In 2024, biologist and essayist Dag O. Hessen published a reflective monograph titled Å tenke med Zapffe – forfatteren, filosofen, pessimisten, humoristen, klatreren, which explores Zapffe's philosophical and literary legacy.

Originally published in Russian in 2025 and translated into English by the author, Vladislav K. Pedder's monograph The Experience of the Tragic presents a systematic reinterpretation of Peter Wessel Zapffe's philosophy while introducing the concept of differential experience – an unmediated engagement with reality encompassing both discernment and transformative aspects that shape responsive patterns and systemic dynamics.

== Translations ==
In 2024, the book was translated into English by Ryan L. Showler and published by Peter Lang. The English edition features introductory essays by Thomas Ligotti and David Benatar. The translation marked the first time Zapffe's major work became widely available to international audiences.

In 2025, a Russian translation by Vladislav K. Pedder was released by the independent publisher Totenburg.
