= Glamorous =

Glamorous may refer to:

- Glamorous (album), a 2005 album by Denise Ho, or the title song
- "Glamorous" (song), a 2006 song by Fergie
- "Glamorous", a 2000 song by Buck-Tick from One Life, One Death
- "Glamorous", a 1993 song by the Jesus Lizard from Pure
- "Glamorous", a 2007 song by Natalia and En Vogue
- "Glamorous", a 2026 song by Nessa Barrett from Tough Love
- Glamorous (TV series), a 2023 Netflix television series
- Glamorous, a member of the Juice Crew

== See also ==
- Glamour (disambiguation)
