= Songs of a Dead Dreamer =

Short story collection by Thomas Ligotti

First edition (publ. Silver Scarab Press) Cover artist: Harry O. Morris

Songs of a Dead Dreamer is a 1986 horror short story collection by American writer Thomas Ligotti. It has been acknowledged as one of the seminal collections of modern weird horror fiction by Ligotti's peers, such as Ramsey Campbell. In 2015, Penguin Classics republished Songs of a Dead Dreamer and Grimscribe together in one volume, making Ligotti one of just 10 living authors to be published by the imprint. Many of its stories show the influence of Ligotti's literary idols of horror such as H.P. Lovecraft and Edgar Allan Poe.

== Editorial history ==
The first edition of Ligotti's book was produced in paperback by Silver Scarab Press, limited to 300 copies. It was re-released in an expanded and revised edition in 1989 by Carroll and Graf. Both editions of the book contain an introduction by Ramsey Campbell. In 2010, Subterranean Press republished the book with author revisions, making it the definitive edition.

== Contents ==
1. Dreams for Sleepwalkers

- "The Frolic"
- "Les Fleurs"
- "Alice's Last Adventure"
- "Dream of a Manikin"
- The Nyctalops Trilogy
  - "The Chymist"
  - "Drink to me Only with Labyrinthine Eyes"
  - "Eye of the Lynx"
- "Notes on the Writing of Horror: A Story" (Added in the 1989 edition)

2. Dreams for Insomniacs

- "The Christmas Eves of Aunt Elise: A Tale of Possession in Old Grosse Pointe"
- "The Lost Art of Twilight"
- "The Troubles of Dr. Thoss"
- "Masquerade of a Dead Sword: A Tragedie"
- "Dr. Voke and Mr. Veech"
- "Professor Nobody's Little Lectures on Supernatural Horror" (Added in the 1989 edition)

3. Dreams for the Dead

- "Dr. Locrian's Asylum"
- "The Sect of the Idiot"
- "The Greater Festival of Masks"
- "The Music of the Moon"
- "The Journal of J.P. Drapeau"
- "Vastarien"

== Film ==
The serial killer story "The Frolic" was filmed in 2007 (directed by Jacob Cooney, based on a screenplay co-authored by Brandon Trenz and Ligotti). Wonder Entertainment has released The Frolic Collector's Edition DVD and Book set, which contains the short film adaptation of the story, and also commentary tracks and behind-the-scenes by Cooney, producer Jane Kelly Kosek, and actor Maury Sterling; a new interview with screenwriters Ligotti and Trenz; a newly revised version of the short story, with a new introduction by Ligotti; and the screenplay, with a new introduction by Trenz. Only 1,000 copies of the collector's edition were released. The book containing the revised text of "The Frolic," was exclusive to this set.

== In popular culture ==
- DJ Spooky's 1996 album of the same name was inspired by the collection.
