= Peter Wessel Zapffe =

Norwegian philosopher (1899–1990)

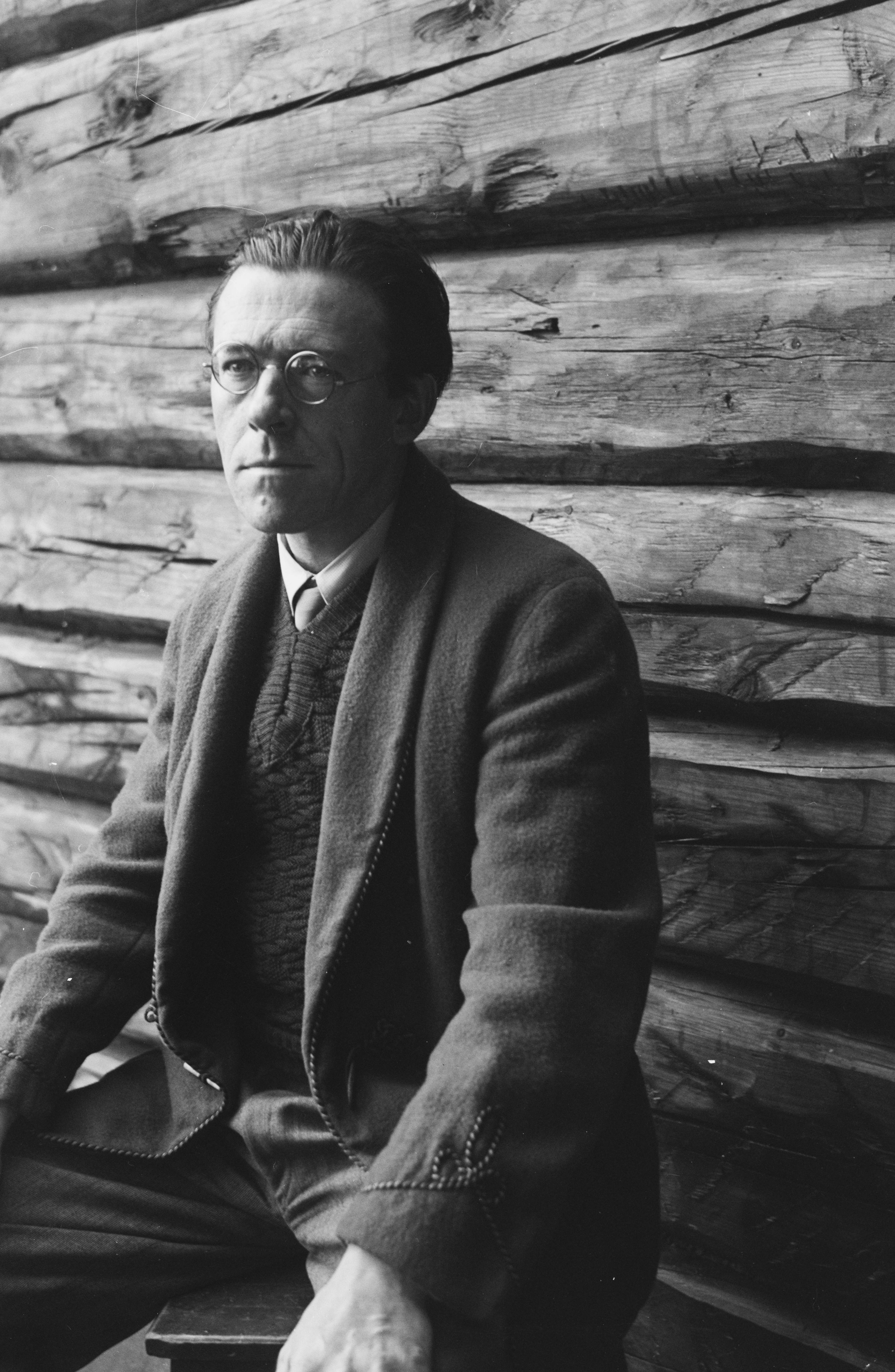
- Zapffe in 1949
- Born: 18 December 1899; Tromsø, Troms, Norway
- Died: 12 October 1990 (aged 90); Asker, Akershus, Norway
- Occupations: Philosopher, author, artist, lawyer, mountaineer
- Spouses: Bergliot Espolin Johnson (m. 1935; div. 1941) Berit Riis Christensen (m. 1952)
- Awards: Fritt Ord Honorary Award (1987)

Education
- Education: University of Oslo

Philosophical work
- Era: 20th-century philosophy
- School: Continental philosophy; Existentialism; Biosophy; Philosophical pessimism
- Main interests: Metaphysics, nihilism, philosophical pessimism
- Notable works: "The Last Messiah"; On the Tragic
- Notable ideas: Antinatalism; Biosophy; "The Last Messiah"; Remedies against panic

Peter Wessel Zapffe (/ˈzɑːpfə/; Norwegian: [ˈsɑ̂pfə]; 18 December 1899 – 12 October 1990) was a Norwegian philosopher, author, artist, lawyer, and mountaineer. He is often noted for his philosophically pessimistic and fatalistic view of human existence. His system of philosophy was inspired by the German philosopher Arthur Schopenhauer, as well as his firm advocacy of antinatalism. His thoughts regarding the error of human life are presented in the essay "The Last Messiah" ("Den sidste Messias", 1933). This essay is a shorter version of his best-known work, the philosophical treatise On the Tragic (Om det tragiske, 1941).

== Philosophical work ==
Zapffe's view is that humans are born with an overdeveloped consciousness (self-reflection, self-knowledge) which does not fit into nature's design. The human craving for justification on matters such as life, death and meaning cannot be satisfied, hence humanity has a need that life cannot fully satisfy. The tragedy, following this theory, is that humans spend their time trying to dull their consciousness, to escape the burdens of existential reflection. The human being is thus a paradox, given that self-reflection is one of the prime attributes associated with human consciousness. Death anxiety is a major part of this reflection, according to Zapffe, and the human being is unique among living beings in the ability to reflect on their own forthcoming death.

In "The Last Messiah", Zapffe described four principal defense mechanisms that humankind uses to avoid facing this paradox:

- Isolation is "a fully arbitrary dismissal from consciousness of all disturbing and destructive thought and feeling".
- Anchoring is the "fixation of points within, or construction of walls around, the liquid fray of consciousness". The anchoring mechanism provides individuals with a value or an ideal to consistently focus their attention on. Zapffe also applied the anchoring principle to society and stated that "God, the Church, the State, morality, fate, the laws of life, the people, the future" are all examples of collective primary anchoring firmaments.
- Distraction is when "one limits attention to the critical bounds by constantly enthralling it with impressions". Distraction focuses all of one's energy on a task or idea to prevent the mind from turning in on itself.
- Sublimation is the refocusing of energy away from negative outlets toward positive ones. The individuals distance themselves and look at their existence from an aesthetic point of view (e.g., writers, poets, painters). Zapffe himself pointed out that his produced works were the product of sublimation.

On the occasion of the 65th birthday of the Norwegian–Canadian philosopher Herman Tønnessen, the book I Choose the Truth. A Dialogue Between Peter Wessel Zapffe and Herman Tønnessen (1983) was published. The two had known each other already for many years. Tønnessen had studied at the University of Oslo together with Arne Næss.

== Other interests and works ==
Zapffe was a prolific mountaineer and took a very early interest in environmentalism; this form of nature conservationism sprung from the intent, not of protecting nature, but to avoid human culturalization of nature.

Zapffe was the author of many humorous short stories about climbing and other adventures in nature.

== Personal life ==
Son of the apothecary Fritz Gottlieb Zapffe and Gudrun Wessel, Zapffe was related on his maternal side to the Danish-Norwegian vice-admiral Peter Tordenskjold.

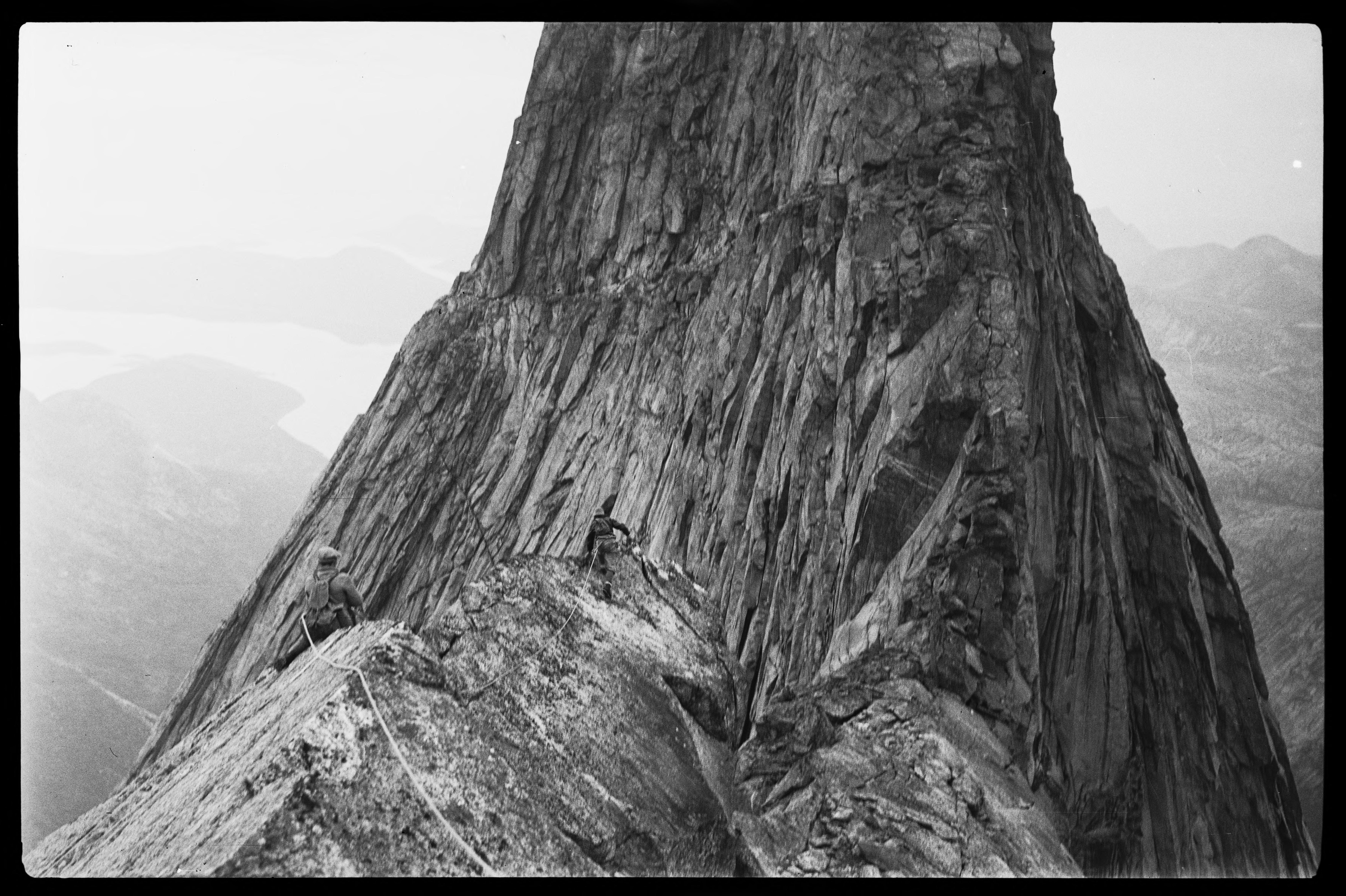
Ascent to the Stetind with Arne Næss, 1937

In Kristiania, in 1921, Zapffe learned for the first time about mountaineering, beginning with climbing challenges in Bærum, in Kolsås, the first mountain he climbed. In 1924 he was the first person to climb the top of Tommeltott in Ullsfjorden; in 1925, the Småtind (south side) in Kvaløya; and the Bentsjordtind between Malangen and Balsfjorden. And in the same year: Okshorn, Snekollen and Mykkjetind were climbed. In 1926 it was a summit in Senja and also the Hollenderan summit in Kvaløya, first trodden by him: in 1987 the highest peak of the Hollenderan in Kvaløya was named after him. Today the summit is called "Zapffes tind" ('the top of Zapffe'). In 1928, Zapffe climbed the first summit of Skamtinden and was also the first to climb the front side of Svolværgeita.

In 1940 Zapffe applied to the Norsk Tindeklubb but was rejected. However, in 1965 he was accepted into a mountaineering society as an honorary member, and again in 1987 in a mountaineering club from Tromsø.

In 1928, due to a storm, Umberto Nobile's zeppelin, the Italia, crashed on the way back to Italy. Roald Amundsen (a friend of the Zapffe family) and Zapffe assisted in the rescue of the zeppelin crew. There, Zappfe served as interpreter for the expedition. Later on the icebreaker DS Isbjørn, Zapffe served as German interpreter (his father was also on board); the expedition was to search for the missing Amundsen, but was unsuccessful.

Zapffe left Tromsø on June 5, 1929. He found a room on Erling Skjalgssøns street in Kristiania, living quite frugally and in a mentally catastrophic state: "The idea of death as the greatest consolation and escape, and which is always at hand, penetrates me with even greater force".

Like Emil Cioran, he lived from 1978 on a state pension. In 1987, he received the Honor Award from the Fritt Ord Foundation for "the original and versatile character of his literary work".

In his last years of life, when he was frequently visited by journalists, he had an interview with Asker og Bærum Budstikke, in which he described himself as a nihilist: "I am not a pessimist. I am a nihilist. Namely, not a pessimist in the sense that I have upsetting apprehensions, but a nihilist in a sense that is not moral".

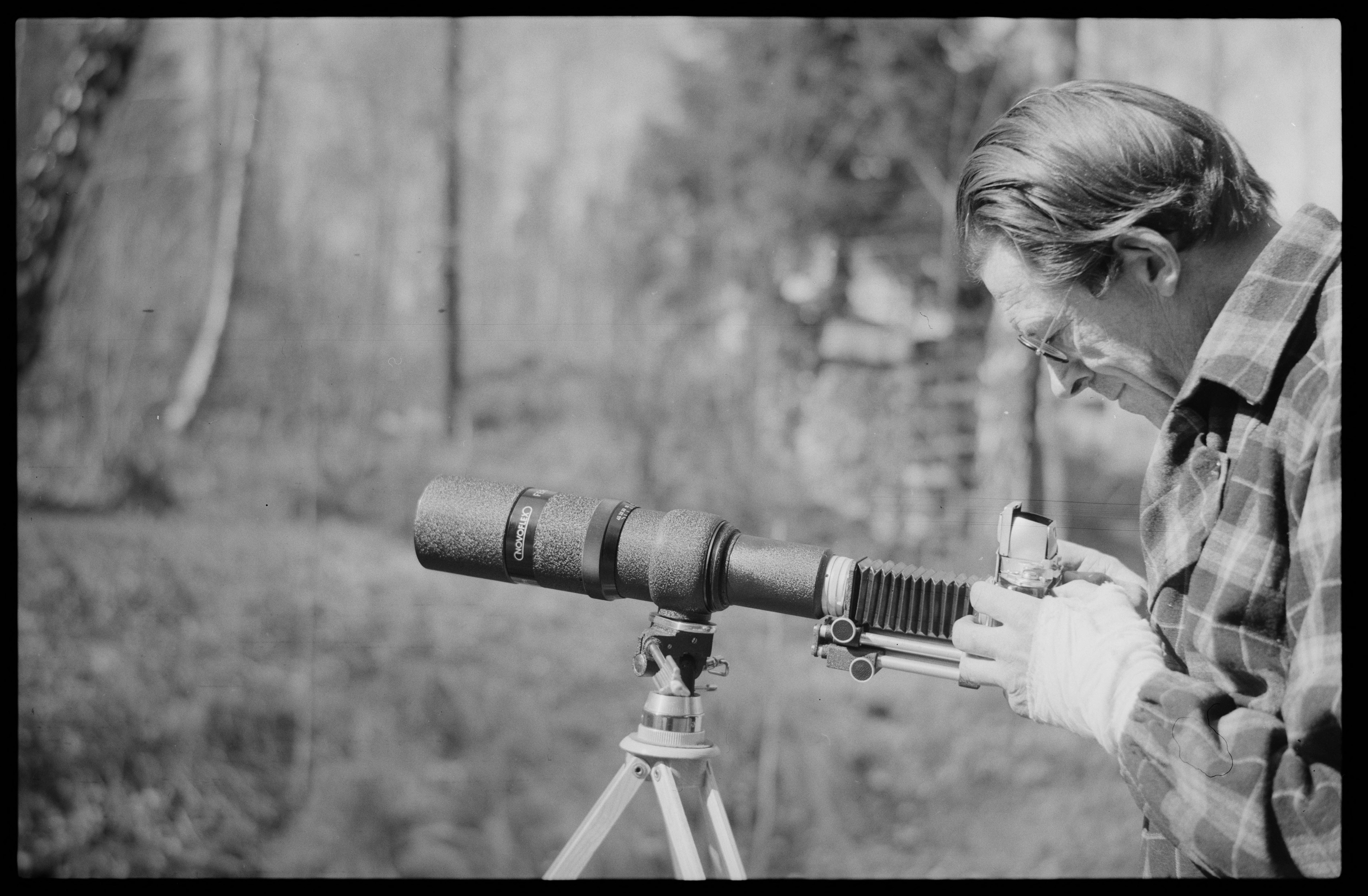
Zapffe with camera, 1949

Zapffe's hobbies were varied, showing an early enthusiasm for painting. However, photography occupied him from the age of 12 through his father (himself a photographer), who lent his photographic equipment to his son. This also meant a kind of compensation for his myopia. The impact of his work as a photographer can be seen reflected in his work Rough Joys (1969), where he creates ekphrasis from his photographic documentation during his trips to the mountains. Much of his photographic production is currently cultural heritage.

Zapffe married Bergljot Espolin Johnsen in 1935; they divorced in 1941. He married Berit Riis Christensen in 1952, they remained together until his death in 1990; Berit died in May 2008. Zapffe remained childless by choice. He was lifelong friends with the Norwegian philosopher, and fellow mountaineer, Arne Næss.

== Selected works ==
- Om det tragiske, Oslo, 1941 and 1983. On the Tragic, translated by Ryan L. Showler (2024).
- Den fortapte sønn. En dramatisk gjenfortælling (En: The Prodigal Son: A Dramatic Renarration), Oslo, 1951.
- Indføring i litterær dramaturgi (En: Introduction to Literary Dramaturgy), Oslo, 1961.
- Den logiske sandkasse. Elementær logikk for universitet og selvstudium (En: The Logical Sandpit: Elementary Logic for University and Individual Study), Oslo, 1965.
- Lyksalig pinsefest. Fire samtaler med Jørgen (En: Blissful Pentecost: Four Dialogues with Jørgen), Oslo, 1972.
- Hos doktor Wangel. En alvorlig spøk i fem akter (En: With Doctor Wangel: An Earnest Jest in Five Acts), by Ib Henriksen (pseudonym.), Oslo, 1974. Play.
- Rikets hemmelighet. En kortfattet Jesus-biografi (En: The Secret of the Kingdom: A Short Biography of Jesus), Oslo, 1985.

=== Collections of his shorter writings ===
- Essays og epistler (En: Essays and epistles), Oslo, 1967.
- Barske glæder og andre temaer fra et liv under åpen himmel (En: Rough Joys, and other themes from a life lived under the open sky), Oslo 1969.
- Spøk og alvor. Epistler og leilighetsvers (En: Jest and Earnest: epistles and occasional verse), Oslo, 1977.
- Jeg velger sannheten: en dialog mellom Peter Wessel Zapffe og Herman Tønnessen (En: I choose the truth: a dialogue between Peter Wessel Zapffe and Herman Tonnesen), Oslo, 1983.
- Hvordan jeg blev så flink og andre tekster (En: How I Became So Clever, and other texts), Oslo, 1986.
- Vett og uvett. Stubber fra Troms og Nordland (En: Sense and Nonsense: Short Stories from Troms and Nordland) by Einar K. Aas and P. W. Zapffe, Trondheim 1942. Illustrated by Kaare Espolin Johnson.

== Gallery ==
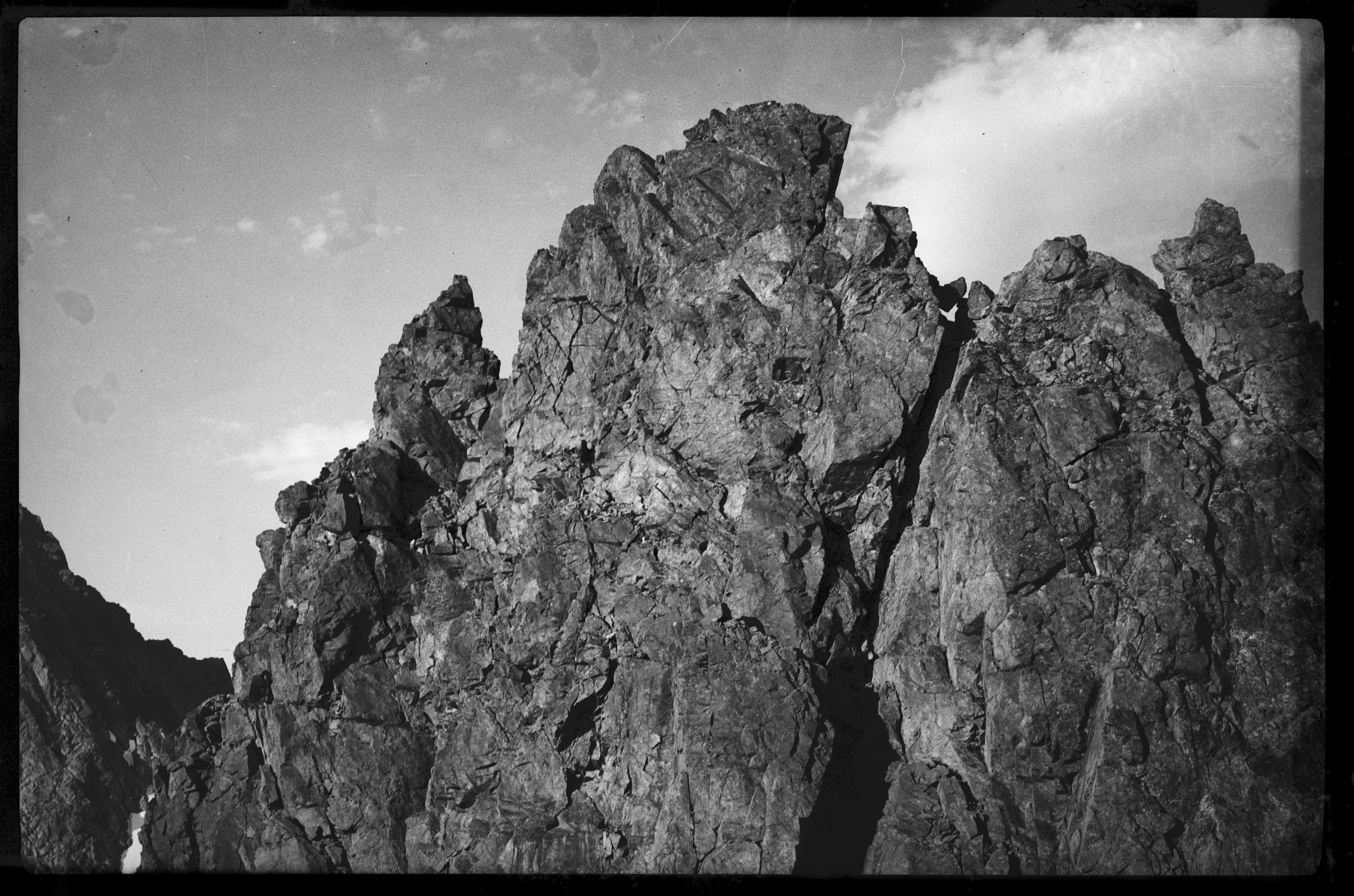
Jægervatnet c. 1945

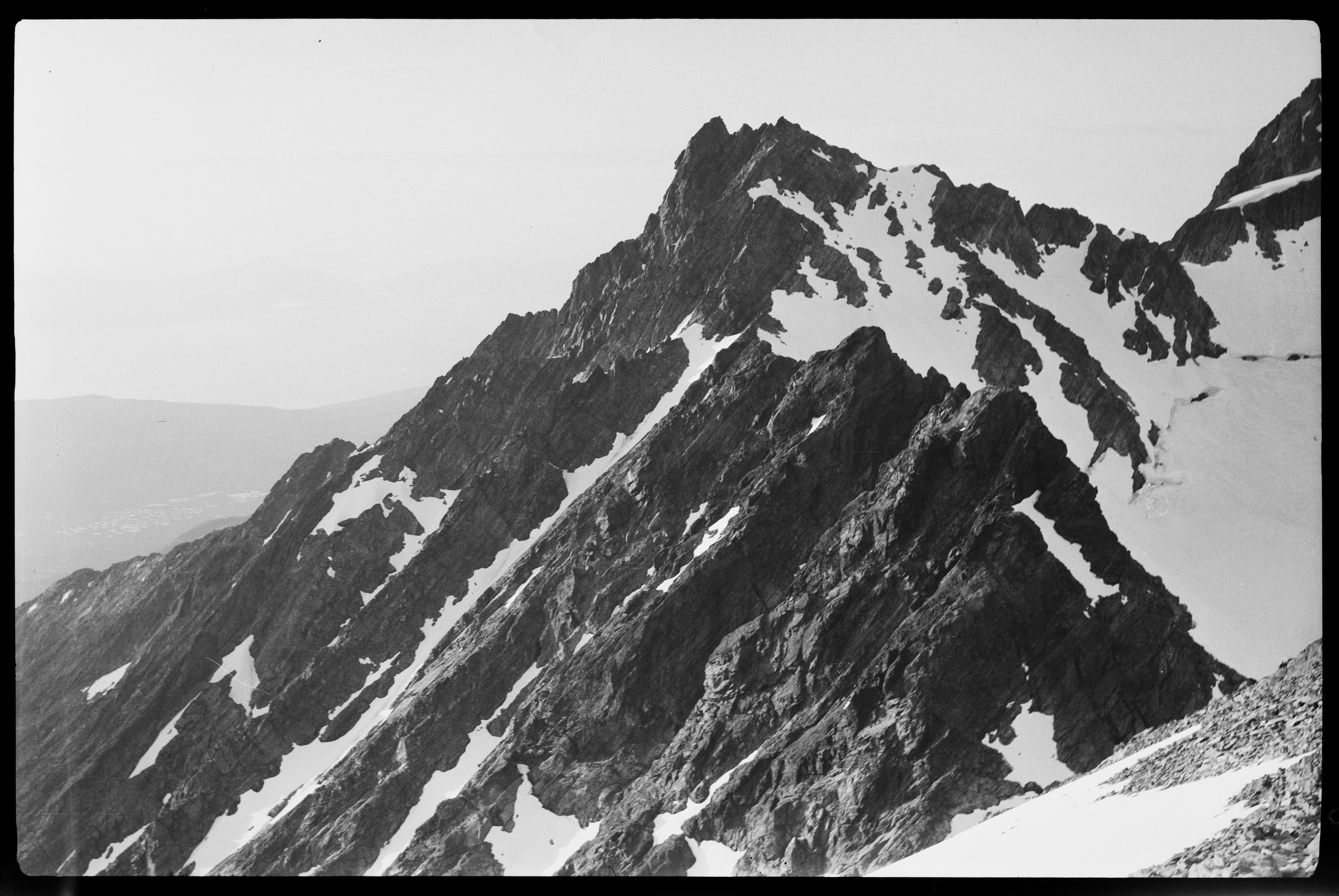
Jægervatnet c. 1945

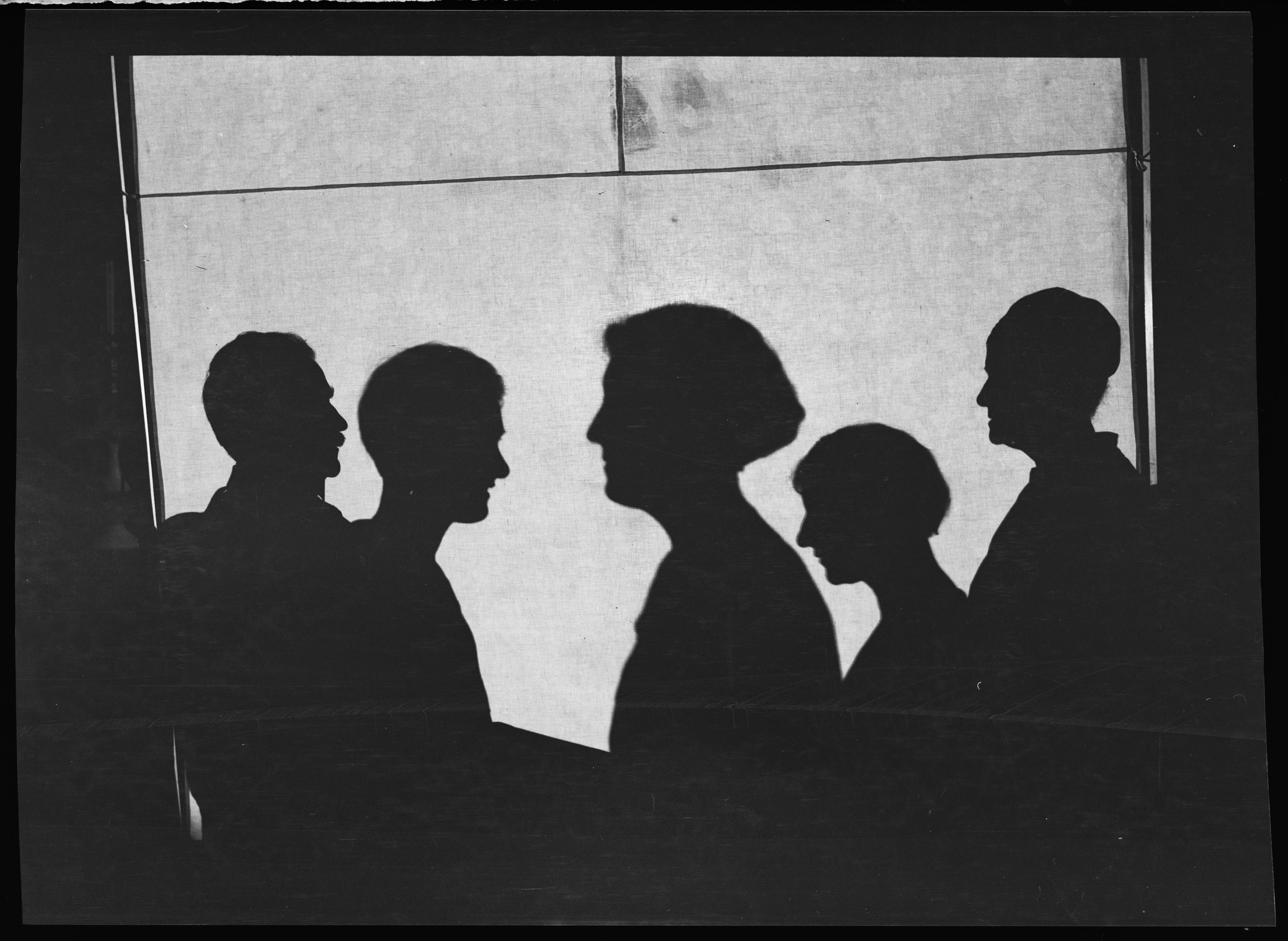
Silhouettes of people c. 1950

== See also ==
- Emil Cioran
- Existential crisis
- Herman Tønnessen
