= Antinatalism =

Value judgment that procreation is unethical

Antinatalism or anti-natalism is the philosophical value judgment that procreation is unethical or unjustifiable. Antinatalists thus argue that people should abstain from making children. Some antinatalists consider coming into existence to always be a serious harm. Their views are not necessarily limited only to human beings but may encompass all sentient creatures, arguing that coming into existence is a serious harm for sentient beings in general.

There are various reasons why antinatalists believe human reproduction is problematic. The most common arguments for antinatalism include imposing a risk of serious harm onto someone else, causing instances of inevitable suffering (for example dying) without consent (because one cannot choose whether or not they come into existence), and the indirect harms caused by any human being to other people, animals and the environment. There is also an axiological asymmetry between good and bad things in life, such that coming into existence is always a harm, which is known as Benatar's asymmetry argument.

Antinatalism as a philosophical concept is to be distinguished from antinatalist policies employed by some countries (governmental population control measures). In antinatalist population policy, it is not always implied that coming into existence is a universal problem and is an ever-present harm to the one whose existence was started.

There exists a taxonomy that divides the so-called "antiprocreative" (at times called antinatalist) thought into four major branches: childfreeness, the Voluntary Human Extinction Movement (VHEMT), efilism (an ideology that advocates for extreme promortalism and forced extinction), and antinatalism itself. Only the latter one is philosophical antinatalism per se, meeting the definition of philosophical antinatalism and having no other features on top of that, whereas the first three items can only be deemed antinatalistic in the sense that they oppose the alleged duty to procreate.

== Etymology ==
The term antinatalism (in opposition to the term natalism, pronatalism or pro-natalism) was used probably for the first time by Théophile de Giraud in his book L'art de guillotiner les procréateurs: Manifeste anti-nataliste (2006). Masahiro Morioka defines antinatalism as "the thought that all human beings or all sentient beings should not be born." In scholarly and literary writings, various ethical arguments have been put forth in defense of antinatalism, probably the most prominent of which is the asymmetry argument, put forward by South African philosopher David Benatar. Robbert Zandbergen makes a distinction between so-called reactionary (or activist) antinatalism and its more philosophical, originary counterpart. While the former seeks to limit human reproduction locally and/or temporarily, the latter seeks to end it conclusively.

== History ==
=== Early history ===
Antinatalist sentiments have existed for thousands of years. Some of the earliest surviving formulations of the idea that it would be better not to have been born can be found in ancient Greece. One example is from Sophocles's Oedipus at Colonus, written shortly before Sophocles's death in 406 BC:

Not to be born is, beyond all estimation, best; but when a man has seen the light of day, this is next best by far, that with utmost speed he should go back from where he came. For when he has seen youth go by, with its easy merry-making, what hard affliction is foreign to him, what suffering does he not know? Envy, factions, strife, battles, and murders. Last of all falls to his lot old age, blamed, weak, unsociable, friendless, wherein dwells every misery among miseries

The Arab philosopher al-Ma'arri expressed antinatalist sentiments throughout his life. In an elegy composed by him over the loss of a relative, he combines his grief with observations on the ephemerality of this life:

Soften your tread. Methinks the earth's surface is but bodies of the dead,
Walk slowly in the air, so you do not trample on the remains of God's servants.

Al-Ma'arri's self-composed epitaph, on his tomb, states (in regard to life and being born): "This is my father's crime against me, which I myself committed against none."

From Gustave Flaubert, The Letters of Gustave Flaubert 1830–1857, 1846:

The idea of bringing someone into the world fills me with horror. I would curse myself if I were a father. A son of mine! Oh no, no, no! May my entire flesh perish and may I transmit to no one the aggravations and the disgrace of existence

From Arthur Schopenhauer's Parerga and Paralipomena, 1851:

One should try to imagine that the act of procreation were neither a need, nor accompanied by sexual pleasure, but instead a matter of pure, rational reﬂection; could the human race even continue to exist? Would not everyone, on the contrary, have so much compassion for the coming generation that he would rather spare it the burden of existence, or at least refuse to take it upon himself to cold-bloodedly impose it on them?

H.P. Lovecraft:

It is good to be a cynic--it is better to be a contented cat--and it is best not to exist at all. Universal suicide is the most logical thing in the world--we reject it only because of our primitive cowardice and childish fear of the dark. If we were sensible we would seek death--the same blissful blank which we enjoyed before we existed.

'Nietzscheism and Realism', (1921).

== Arguments ==
=== In religion ===
==== Buddhism ====
The teaching of the Buddha, including the Four Noble Truths and the beginning of Mahāvagga, is interpreted by Hari Singh Gour as follows:

Buddha states his propositions in the pedantic style of his age. He throws them into a form of sorites; but, as such, it is logically faulty and all he wishes to convey is this: Oblivious of the suffering to which life is subject, man begets children, and is thus the cause of old age and death. If he would only realize what suffering he would add to by his act, he would desist from the procreation of children; and so stop the operation of old age and death.

The issue of Buddhist antinatalism is also raised by Amy Paris Langenberg. She writes, among other things:

In the medieval Tantric traditions of India and Tibet documented by David Gray and Janet Gyatso, insertive but non-ejaculative sex is theorized as a fast path to liberating realizations, one deemed superior to celibacy for qualified practitioners (Gray 2007; Gyatso 1998). These developments also support the idea that the sex problematic in ancient, classical, and medieval Buddhism had at least as much to do with female fertility and the production of children as with the dangers of errant desire.

Buddhism was understood as antinatalist by Jack Kerouac. Masahiro Morioka argues that ancient Buddhism was both antinatalist and anti-antinatalist:

According to ancient Buddhism, all births are births into the world of suffering; hence, coming into existence must be evaluated negatively. If we focus on this aspect, we can say that ancient Buddhism is antinatalist. However, we can also interpret ancient Buddhism as saying that being born into this human world is affirmed because there is a possibility of reaching nirvana here. Therefore, if we pay attention to this aspect, we cannot instantaneously say that it is antinatalist.

==== Christianity and Gnosticism ====
Church Father John Chrysostom states that spiritual perfection implies virginity:

Thus hath our Lord in His mercy mingled much gentleness with His precepts that it might not be all merely of commandment, but that we might do much also of our own mind. Since it was in His power, had He not been so minded, to extend the commandments further and to say, "he who fasts not continually, let him be chastised; he who keeps not his virginity, let him be punished; he that doth not strip himself of all that he hath, let him suffer the severest penalty." But he did not so, giving thee occasion, if thou wilt, to be forward in doing more. Wherefore both when He was discoursing about virginity, He said, "He that is able to receive, let him receive it:" and in the case of the rich man, some things He commanded, but some He left to the determination of his mind. For He said not, "Sell what thou hast," but, "If thou wilt be perfect, sell."

Augustine of Hippo wrote:

But I am aware of some that murmur: What, say they, if all men should abstain from all sexual intercourse, whence will the human race exist? Would that all would this, only in "charity out of a pure heart, and good conscience, and faith unfeigned;" much more speedily would the City of God be filled, and the end of the world hastened.

Gregory of Nyssa warns that no one should be lured by the argument that procreation is a mechanism that creates children and states that those who refrain from procreation by preserving their virginity "bring about a cancellation of death by preventing it from advancing further because of them, and, by setting themselves up as a kind of boundary stone between life and death, they keep death from going forward". Søren Kierkegaard believed that man enters this world by means of a crime, that their existence is a crime, and procreation is the fall which is the culmination of human egoism. According to him, Christianity exists to block the path of procreation; it is "a salvation but at the same time it is a stopping" that "aims at stopping the whole continuation which leads to the permanence of this world."

The Marcionites, led by the theologian Marcion of Sinope, believed that the visible world is an evil creation of a crude, cruel, jealous, and angry demiurge, Yahweh. According to this teaching, people should oppose him, abandon his world, not create people, and trust in the good God of mercy, foreign and distant.

The Encratites observed that birth leads to death. In order to conquer death, people should desist from procreation: "not produce fresh fodder for death".

The Manichaeans, the Bogomils, and the Cathars believed that procreation sentences the soul to imprisonment in evil matter. They saw procreation as an instrument of an evil god, demiurge, or of Satan that imprisons the divine element in the matter and thus causes the divine element to suffer.

Shakers believe that sex is the root of all sin. Thus although not strictly antinatalist, they see procreation is a sign of the fallen state of humanity.

==== Taoism ====
Robbert Zandbergen compares modern antinatalism to Taoism, stating that they both "view the development of consciousness as an aberration in an otherwise fluid and fluent universe marked by some sense of non-human harmony, stability and tranquility." According to Zandbergen, antinatalism and Taoism view human consciousness as something that cannot be fixed, for example, by returning to a more harmonious way of life, but rather it has to be undone. Humans are tasked with a project of a peaceful, non-violent dismantling of consciousness. From the Taoist perspective, consciousness is purpose-driven, which goes against the spontaneous and unconscious flow of the Tao. Hence, humans have an imperative to return to the Tao. Humans have to do it spontaneously, and it cannot be brought about from "the outside" (the Tao, the Heaven, or anything else). Zandbergen quotes John S. Major et al. 2010 to make the parallel between Taoism and antinatalism even clearer:

冰之凝, 不若其釋也, 又況不為冰乎 Ice is better once it melts; how much better if it had never been frozen.

Water is a traditional representation of the Tao, as it flows without shape. Ice represents the arrest of the natural flow of the Tao in rigid human consciousness. Taoist sages return to the flow like ice melting to water. But it would have been better if human consciousness never had appeared.

=== Theodicy and anthropodicy ===
Julio Cabrera considers the issue of being a creator in relation to theodicy and argues that just as it is impossible to defend the idea of a good God as creator, it is also impossible to defend the idea of a good man as a creator. In parenthood, the human parent imitates the divine parent in the sense that education could be understood as a form of pursuit of "salvation," the "right path" for a child. However, a human being could decide that it is better not to suffer at all than to suffer and be offered the later possibility of salvation from suffering. In Cabrera's opinion, evil is associated not with the lack of being, but with the suffering and dying of those that are alive. So, on the contrary, evil is only and obviously associated with being.

Karim Akerma, due to the moral problem of man as creator, introduces anthropodicy, a twin concept for theodicy. He is of the opinion that the less faith in the Almighty Creator–God there is, the more urgent the question of anthropodicy becomes. Akerma thinks that for those who want to lead ethical lives, the causation of suffering requires a justification. Man can no longer shed responsibility for the suffering that occurs by appealing to an imaginary entity that sets moral principles. For Akerma, antinatalism is a consequence of the collapse of theodicy endeavors and the failure of attempts to establish an anthropodicy. According to him, there is no metaphysics nor moral theory that can justify the production of new people, and therefore, anthropodicy is indefensible as well as theodicy.

Jason Marsh finds no good arguments for what he calls "evil asymmetry"; that the amount and kinds of suffering provide strong arguments that our world is not an act of creation made by a good God, but the same suffering does not affect the morality of the act of procreation.

=== Peter Wessel Zapffe ===
Peter Wessel Zapffe viewed humans as a biological paradox. According to him, consciousness has become over-evolved in humans, thereby making us incapable of functioning normally like other animals: cognition gives us more than we can carry. Our frailness and insignificance in the cosmos are visible to us. We want to live, and yet because of how we have evolved, we are the only species whose members are conscious that they are destined to die. We are able to analyze the past and the future, both our situation and that of others, as well as to imagine the suffering of billions of people (as well as of other living beings) and feel compassion for their suffering. We yearn for justice and meaning in a world that lacks both. This ensures that the lives of conscious individuals are tragic. We have desires: spiritual needs that reality is unable to satisfy, and our species still exists only because we limit our awareness of what that reality actually entails. Human existence amounts to a tangled network of defense mechanisms, which can be observed both individually and socially in our everyday behavior patterns. According to Zapffe, humanity should cease this self-deception, and the natural consequence would be its extinction by abstaining from procreation.

=== Negative ethics ===
Julio Cabrera proposes a concept of "negative ethics" in opposition to "affirmative" ethics, meaning ethics that affirm being. He describes procreation as an act of manipulation and harm – a unilateral and non-consensual sending of a human being into a painful, dangerous, and morally impeding situation.

Cabrera regards procreation as an ontological issue of total manipulation: one's very being is manufactured and used; in contrast to intra-worldly cases where someone is placed in a harmful situation. In the case of procreation, no chance of defense against that act is even available. According to Cabrera: manipulation in procreation is visible primarily in the unilateral and non-consensual nature of the act, which makes procreation per se inevitably asymmetrical; be it a product of forethought, or a product of neglect. It is always connected with the interests (or disinterests) of other humans, not the created human. In addition, Cabrera points out that in his view the manipulation of procreation is not limited to the act of creation itself, but it is continued in the process of raising the child, during which parents gain great power over the child's life, who is shaped according to their preferences and for their satisfaction. He emphasizes that although it is not possible to avoid manipulation in procreation, it is perfectly possible to avoid procreation itself and that then no moral rule is violated.

Cabrera believes that the situation in which one is placed through procreation, human life is structurally negative in that its constitutive features are inherently adverse. The most prominent of them are, according to Cabrera, the following:

1. The being acquired by a human at birth is decreasing (or "decaying"), in the sense of a being that begins to end since its very emergence, following a single and irreversible direction of deterioration and decline, of which complete consummation can occur at any moment between some minutes and around one hundred years.
2. From the moment they come into being, humans are affected by three kinds of frictions: physical pain (in the form of illnesses, accidents, and natural catastrophes to which they are always exposed); discouragement (in the form of "lacking the will", or the "mood" or the "spirit", to continue to act, from mild taedium vitae to serious forms of depression), and finally, exposure to the aggressions of other humans (from gossip and slander to various forms of discrimination, persecution, and injustice); aggressions that we too can inflict on others (who are also submitted, like us, to the three kinds of friction).
3. To defend themselves against (a) and (b), human beings are equipped with mechanisms of creation of positive values (ethical, aesthetic, religious, entertaining, recreational, as well as values contained in human realizations of all kinds), which humans must keep constantly active. All positive values that appear within human life are reactive and palliative; they do not arise from the structure of life itself, but are introduced by the permanent and anxious struggle against the decaying life and its three kinds of friction, with such struggle however doomed to be defeated, at any moment, by any of the mentioned frictions or by the progressive decline of one's being.

Cabrera calls the set of these characteristics A–C the "terminality of being". He is of the opinion that a huge number of humans around the world cannot withstand this steep struggle against the terminal structure of their being, which leads to destructive consequences for them and others: suicides, major or minor mental illnesses, or aggressive behavior. He accepts that life may be – thanks to human's own merits and efforts – bearable and even very pleasant (though not for all, due to the phenomenon of moral impediment), but also considers it problematic to bring someone into existence so that they may attempt to make their life pleasant by struggling against the difficult and oppressive situation we place them in by procreating. It seems more reasonable, according to Cabrera, simply not to put them in that situation, since the results of their struggle are always uncertain.

Cabrera believes that in ethics, including affirmative ethics, there is one overarching concept which he calls the "Minimal Ethical Articulation", "MEA" (previously translated into English as "Fundamental Ethical Articulation" and "FEA"): the consideration of other people's interests, not manipulating them and not harming them. Procreation for him is an obvious violation of MEA – someone is manipulated and placed in a harmful situation as a result of that action. In his view, values included in the MEA are widely accepted by affirmative ethics, they are even their basics, and if approached radically, they should lead to the refusal of procreation.

For Cabrera, the worst thing in human life and by extension in procreation is what he calls "moral impediment": the structural impossibility of acting in the world without harming or manipulating someone at some given moment. This impediment does not occur because of an intrinsic "evil" of human nature, but because of the structural situation in which the human being has always been. In this situation, we are cornered by various kinds of structural discomforts while having to conduct our lives in a limited amount of time and in limited spaces of action, such that different interests often conflict with each other. We do not have to have bad intentions to treat others with disregard; we are compelled to do so in order to survive, pursue our projects, and escape from suffering. Cabrera also draws attention to the fact that life is associated with the constant risk of one experiencing strong physical pain, which is common in human life, for example as a result of a serious illness, and maintains that the mere existence of such possibility impedes us morally, as well as that because of it, we can at any time lose, as a result of its occurrence, the possibility of a dignified, moral functioning even to a minimal extent.

=== Kantian imperative ===
Julio Cabrera, David Benatar and Karim Akerma all argue that procreation is contrary to Immanuel Kant's practical imperative (according to Kant, a man should never be used as merely a means to an end, but always be treated as an end in himself). They argue that a person can be created for the sake of their parents or other people, but that it is impossible to create someone for their own good; and that, therefore, following Kant's recommendation, we should not create new people. Heiko Puls argues that Kant's considerations regarding parental duties and human procreation, in general, imply arguments for an ethically justified antinatalism. Kant, however, according to Puls, rejects this position in his teleology for meta-ethical reasons.

=== Impossibility of consent ===
Seana Shiffrin, Gerald Harrison, Julia Tanner, and Asheel Singh argue that procreation is morally problematic because of the impossibility of obtaining consent from the human who will be brought into existence.

Gerald Harrison and Julia Tanner argue that when we want to significantly affect someone by our action and it is not possible to get their consent, then the default should be to not take such action. The exception is, according to them, actions by which we want to prevent greater harm of a person (for example, pushing someone out of the way of a falling piano). However, in their opinion, such actions certainly do not include procreation, because before taking this action a person does not exist.

Asheel Singh emphasizes that one does not have to think that coming into existence is always an overall harm in order to recognize antinatalism as a correct view. In his opinion, it is enough to think that there is no moral right to inflict serious, preventable harms upon others without their consent. He extends argumentation by Seana Shiffrin, who views procreation as always problematic due to significant harm imposed on children but she denies the inference to the antinatalist conclusion. Singh supports the antinatalist position based on Shiffrin's principle that we can only non-consensually impose significant harm on another person, if it is done for a great benefit to him.

Chip Smith and Max Freiheit argue that procreation is contrary to non-aggression principle of right-wing libertarians, according to which nonconsensual actions should not be taken toward other people.

=== Cosmic mistake ===
Robbert Zandbergen claims that life emerges as the result of some cosmic mistake and humans should rectify this situation. One avenue of this rectification is the limiting or conclusion of reproduction.

=== Negative utilitarianism ===
Negative utilitarianism argues that minimizing suffering has greater moral importance than maximizing happiness.

Hermann Vetter agrees with the assumptions of Jan Narveson:

1. There is no moral obligation to produce a child even if we could be sure that it will be very happy throughout its life.
2. There is a moral obligation not to produce a child if it can be foreseen that it will be unhappy.

However, he disagrees with the conclusion that Narveson draws:

3. In general – if it can be foreseen neither that the child will be unhappy nor that it will bring disutility upon others – there is no duty to have or not to have a child.

Instead, he presents the following decision-theoretic matrix:

| Outcome Decision | Child will be more or less happy | Child will be more or less unhappy |
|---|---|---|
| Produce the child | No duty fulfilled or violated | Duty violated |
| Do not produce the child | No duty fulfilled or violated | Duty fulfilled |

Based on this, he concludes that we should not create people:

It is seen immediately that the act "do not produce the child" dominates the act "produce the child" because it has equally good consequences as the other act in one case and better consequences in the other. So it is to be preferred to the other act as long as we cannot exclude with certainty the possibility that the child will be more or less unhappy; and we never can. So we have, instead of (3), the far-reaching consequence: (3') In any case, it is morally preferable not to produce a child.

Karim Akerma argues that utilitarianism requires the least metaphysical assumptions and is, therefore, the most convincing ethical theory. He believes that negative utilitarianism is the right one because the good things in life do not compensate for the bad things; first and foremost, the best things do not compensate for the worst things such as, for example, the experiences of terrible pain, the agonies of the wounded, sick or dying. In his opinion, we also rarely know what to do to make people happy, but we know what to do so that people do not suffer: it is enough that they are not created. What is important for Akerma in ethics is the striving for the fewest suffering people (ultimately no one), not striving for the happiest people, which, according to him, takes place at the expense of immeasurable suffering.

Miguel Steiner believes that antinatalism is justified by two converging perspectives:

1. personal – no one can predict the fate of their child, but it is known that they are exposed to numerous dangers in the form of terrible suffering and death, usually traumatic,
2. demographic – there is a demographic dimension of suffering in connection with which the number of victims of various types of problems (e.g. hunger, disease, violence) increases or decreases depending on the size of the population.

He maintains that our concept of evil comes from our experience of suffering: there is no evil without the possibility of experiencing suffering. Consequently, the smaller the population, the less evil is happening in the world. In his opinion, from an ethical point of view, this is what we should strive for: to narrow the space in which evil – which is suffering – takes place and which space is widened by procreation.

=== Walking away from Omelas ===
Bruno Contestabile and Sam Woolfe cite the story The Ones Who Walk Away from Omelas by Ursula K. Le Guin. In this story, the existence of the utopian city of Omelas and the good fortune of its inhabitants depend on the suffering of one child who is tortured in an isolated place and who cannot be helped. The majority accepts this state of affairs and stays in the city, but there are those who do not agree with it, who do not want to participate in it, and thus they "walk away from Omelas". Contestabile and Woolfe draw a parallel here: for Omelas to exist, the child must be tortured, and in the same way, the existence of our world is related to the fact that someone innocent is constantly harmed. According to Contestabile and Woolfe, antinatalists can be seen just as "the ones who walk away from Omelas", who do not accept such a world, and who do not approve of its perpetuation. Contestabile poses the question: is all happiness able to compensate for the extreme suffering of even one person? The question of whether universal harmony is worth the tears of one child tormented to death has already appeared before in Fyodor Dostoevsky's The Brothers Karamazov, and Irina Uriupina writes about it in the context of antinatalism.

=== David Benatar's arguments ===
==== Asymmetry between good and bad things ====
David Benatar argues that there is a crucial asymmetry between the good and the bad things, such as pleasure and pain:

1. the presence of pain is bad.
2. the presence of pleasure is good.
3. the absence of pain is good, even if that good is not enjoyed by anyone.
4. the absence of pleasure is not bad unless there is somebody for whom this absence is a deprivation.

| Scenario A (X exists) | Scenario B (X never exists) |
|---|---|
| 1. Presence of pain (Bad) | 3. Absence of pain (Good) |
| 2. Presence of pleasure (Good) | 4. Absence of pleasure (Not bad) |

Regarding procreation, the argument follows that coming into existence generates both good and bad experiences, such as pain and pleasure, whereas not coming into existence entails neither pain nor pleasure. The absence of pain is good, while the absence of pleasure is not bad. Therefore, the ethical choice is weighed in favor of non-procreation.

==== Suffering experienced by descendants ====
According to Benatar, by creating a child, we are responsible not only for that child's suffering, but we may also be co-responsible for the suffering of further offspring of this child.

Assuming that each couple has three children, an original pair's cumulative descendants over ten generations amount to 88,572 people. That constitutes a lot of pointless, avoidable suffering. To be sure, full responsibility for it all does not lie with the original couple because each new generation faces the choice of whether to continue that line of descendants. Nevertheless, they bear some responsibility for the generations that ensue. If one does not desist from having children, one can hardly expect one's descendants to do so.

==== Consequences of procreation ====
Benatar cites statistics showing where the creation of people leads. It is estimated that:

- more than fifteen million people are thought to have died from natural disasters in the last 1,000 years,
- approximately 20,000 people die every day from starvation,
- an estimated 840 million people suffer from hunger and malnutrition,
- between 541 and 1912, it is estimated that over 102 million people succumbed to plague,
- the 1918 influenza epidemic killed 50 million people,
- nearly 11 million people die every year from infectious diseases,
- malignant neoplasms take more than a further 7 million lives each year,
- approximately 3.5 million people die every year in accidents,
- approximately 56.5 million people died in 2001, that is more than 107 people per minute,
- before the twentieth century over 133 million people were killed in mass killings,
- in the first 88 years of the twentieth century 170 million (and possibly as many as 360 million) people were shot, beaten, tortured, knifed, burned, starved, frozen, crushed, or worked to death; buried alive, drowned, hanged, bombed, or killed in any other of the myriad ways governments have inflicted death on unarmed, helpless citizens and foreigners,
- there were 1.6 million conflict-related deaths in the sixteenth century, 6.1 million in the seventeenth century, 7 million in the eighteenth, 19.4 million in the nineteenth, and 109.7 million in the twentieth,
- war-related injuries led to 310,000 deaths in 2000,
- about 40 million children are maltreated each year,
- more than 100 million currently living women and girls have been subjected to female genital mutilation,
- over 80% of newborn American boys have also been subjected to genital mutilation,
- about 815,000 people are thought to have committed suicide in 2000; in 2016, the International Association for Suicide Prevention estimated that someone commits suicide every 40 seconds, or more than 800,000 people per year.

==== Misanthropy ====
In addition to the philanthropic arguments, which are based on a concern for the humans who will be brought into existence, Benatar also posits that another path to antinatalism is the misanthropic argument. Benatar states that:

According to this argument, humans are a deeply flawed and destructive species that is responsible for the suffering and deaths of billions of other humans and non-human animals. If that level of destruction were caused by another species we would rapidly recommend that new members of that species not be brought into existence.

=== Harm to nonhuman animals ===
David Benatar, Gunter Bleibohm, Gerald Harrison, Julia Tanner, and Patricia MacCormack are attentive to the harm caused to other sentient beings by humans. They would say that billions of nonhuman animals are abused and slaughtered each year by our species for the production of animal products, for experimentation and after the experiments (when they are no longer needed), as a result of the destruction of habitats or other environmental damage and for sadistic pleasure. They tend to agree with animal rights thinkers that the harm we do to them is immoral. They consider the human species the most destructive on the planet, arguing that without new humans, there will be no harm caused to other sentient beings by new humans.

Some antinatalists are also vegetarians or vegans for moral reasons, and postulate that such views should complement each other as having a common denominator: not causing harm to other sentient beings. This attitude was already present in Manichaeism and Catharism. The Cathars interpreted the commandment "thou shalt not kill" as relating also to other mammals and birds. It was recommended not to eat their meat, dairy and eggs.

=== Environmental impact ===
Volunteers of the Voluntary Human Extinction Movement, the Church of Euthanasia, Stop Having Kids, and Patricia MacCormack argue that human activity is the primary cause of environmental degradation, and therefore refraining from procreation and allowing for eventual human extinction is the best alternative for the planet and its nonhuman inhabitants to flourish. According to the group Stop Having Kids: "The end of humans is the end of the human world, not the end of the world at large."

=== Adoption, helping humans and other animals ===
Herman Vetter, Théophile de Giraud, Travis N. Rieder, Tina Rulli, Karim Akerma and Julio Cabrera argue that presently rather than engaging in the morally problematic act of procreation, one could do good by adopting already existing children. De Giraud emphasizes that, across the world, there are millions of existing children who need care. Stuart Rachels and David Benatar argue that presently, in a situation where a huge number of people live in poverty, we should cease procreation and divert these resources, that would have been used to raise our own children, to the poor. Patricia MacCormack points out that resignation from procreation and striving for human extinction can make it possible to care for humans and other animals: those who are already here.

== Antinatalism and other philosophical topics ==
=== Realism ===
Some antinatalists believe that most people do not evaluate reality accurately, which affects the desire to have children.

Peter Wessel Zapffe identifies four repressive mechanisms humans use, consciously or not, to restrict their consciousness of life and the world:

- Isolation: an arbitrary dismissal from the consciousness of an individual and the consciousness of others about all negative thoughts and feelings associated with the unpleasant facts of human existence. In daily life, this manifests as a tacit agreement to remain silent on certain subjects – especially around children, to prevent instilling in them a fear of the world and what awaits them in life, before they will be able to learn other mechanisms.
- Anchoring: the creation and use of personal values to ensure attachment to reality, such as parents, home, the street, school, God, the church, the state, morality, fate, the law of life, the people, the future, accumulation of material goods or authority, etc. This can be characterized as creating a defensive structure, "a fixation of points within, or construction of walls around, the liquid fray of consciousness", and defending the structure against threats.
- Distraction: shifting focus to new impressions to flee from circumstances and ideas humans consider harmful or unpleasant.
- Sublimation: refocusing the tragic parts of life into something creative or valuable, usually through an aesthetic confrontation for the purpose of catharsis. This is typically seen as a focus on the imaginary, dramatic, heroic, lyric or comic aspects of life, to allow for an escape from their true impact.

According to Zapffe, depressive disorders are often "messages from a deeper, more immediate sense of life, bitter fruits of a geniality of thought". Some studies seem to confirm this: it is said about the phenomenon of depressive realism, and both Colin Feltham and John Pollard write about antinatalism as one of its possible consequences.

David Benatar, citing numerous studies, lists three phenomena described by psychologists, which, according to him, are responsible for making personal self-assessments about the quality of one's life unreliable:

- Tendency towards optimism (or Pollyanna principle) – Humans have a positively distorted picture of their lives in the past, present and future.
- Adaptation (or accommodation, or habituation) – Humans adapt to negative situations and adjust their expectations accordingly.
- Comparison – for one's self-assessments about the quality of their life, more important than how their life goes is how it goes in comparison with the lives of others. One of the effects of this is that negative aspects of life that affect everyone are not taken into account when assessing their own well-being. Humans are also more likely to compare themselves with those who are worse off than those who are better off.

Benatar concludes:

The above psychological phenomena are unsurprising from an evolutionary perspective. They militate against suicide and in favour of reproduction. If our lives are quite as bad as I shall still suggest they are, and if people were prone to see this true quality of their lives for what it is, they might be much more inclined to kill themselves, or at least not to produce more such lives. Pessimism, then, tends not to be naturally selected.

Thomas Ligotti draws attention to the similarity between Zapffe's philosophy and terror management theory. Terror management theory argues that humans are equipped with unique cognitive abilities beyond what is necessary for survival, which includes symbolic thinking, extensive self-consciousness and perception of themselves as temporal beings aware of the finitude of their existence. The desire to live alongside the awareness of the inevitability of death triggers terror in humans. Opposition to this fear is among humans' primary motivations. To escape it, humans build defensive structures around themselves to ensure their symbolic or literal immortality, to feel like valuable members of a meaningful universe, and to focus on protecting themselves from immediate external threats.

=== Abortion ===
Antinatalism can lead to a particular position on the morality of abortion.

According to David Benatar, one comes into existence in the morally relevant sense when consciousness arises, when a fetus becomes sentient, and up until that time an abortion is moral, whereas continued pregnancy would be immoral. Benatar refers to EEG brain studies and studies on the pain perception of the fetus, which states that fetal consciousness arises no earlier than between twenty-eight and thirty weeks of pregnancy, before which it is incapable of feeling pain. A 2010 report from the Royal College of Obstetricians and Gynaecologists also showed that a fetus could not gain consciousness prior to week twenty-four of the pregnancy, and apparently never does at any point in utero, stating that "there appeared to be no clear benefit in considering the need for fetal analgesia prior to termination of pregnancy, even after 24 weeks". Some assumptions of this report regarding sentience of the fetus after the second trimester were criticized. In a similar way argues Karim Akerma. He distinguishes between organisms that do not have mental properties and living beings that have mental properties. According to his view, which he calls the mentalistic view, a living being begins to exist when an organism (or another entity) produces a simple form of consciousness for the first time.

Julio Cabrera believes that the moral problem of abortion is totally different from the problem of abstention of procreation because in the case of abortion, there is no longer a non-being, but an already existing being – the most helpless and defenseless of the parties involved, that someday might have the autonomy to decide, and we cannot decide for them. From the point of view of Cabrera's negative ethics, abortion is immoral for similar reasons as procreation. For Cabrera, the exception in which abortion is morally justified is cases of irreversible illness of the fetus (or some serious "social illnesses" like American conquest or Nazism), according to him in such cases we are clearly thinking about the unborn, and not simply of our own interests. In addition, Cabrera believes that under certain circumstances, it is legitimate and comprehensible to commit unethical actions, for example, abortion is legitimate and comprehensible when the mother's life is at risk or when pregnancy is the result of rape – in such situations it is necessary to be sensitive without assuming a rigid principalism.

=== Procreation of non-human animals ===
Some antinatalists view the breeding of animals as morally bad, and some view sterilization as morally good in their case. Karim Akerma defines antinatalism that includes animals as universal antinatalism and he assumes such a position himself:

By sterilising animals, we can free them from being slaves to their instincts and from bringing more and more captive animals into the cycle of being born, contracting parasites, ageing, falling ill and dying; eating and being eaten.

David Benatar emphasizes that his argumentation applies to all sentient beings and mentions that humans play a role in deciding how many animals there will be: humans breed other species of animals and are able to sterilize other species of animals. He says it would be better if all species of sentient beings became extinct. In particular, he is explicit in judging the breeding of animals as morally bad:

Because my arguments apply not only to humans but also to other sentient animals, my arguments are also zoophilic (in the non-sexual sense of that term). Bringing a sentient life into existence is a harm to the being whose life it is. My arguments suggest that it is wrong to inflict this harm.

Magnus Vinding argues that the lives of wild animals suffering in their natural environment are generally very bad. He draws attention to phenomena such as dying before adulthood, starvation, disease, parasitism, infanticide, predation and being eaten alive. He cites research on what animal life looks like in the wild. One of eight male lion cubs survives into adulthood. Others die as a result of starvation, disease and often fall victims to the teeth and claws of other lions. Attaining adulthood is much rarer for fish. Only one in a hundred male chinook salmon survives into adulthood. Vinding is of the opinion that if human lives and the survival of human children looked like this, current human values would disallow procreation; however, this is not possible when it comes to animals, who are guided by instinct. He takes the view that even if one does not agree that procreation is always morally bad, one should recognize procreation in wildlife as morally bad and something that ought to be prevented (at least in theory, not necessarily in practice). He maintains that non-intervention cannot be defended if we reject speciesism and that we should reject the unjustifiable dogma stating that what is happening in nature is what should be happening in nature.

We cannot allow ourselves to spuriously rationalize away the suffering that takes place in nature, and to forget the victims of the horrors of nature merely because that reality does not fit into our convenient moral theories, theories that ultimately just serve to make us feel consistent and good about ourselves in the face of an incomprehensibly bad reality.

Similar arguments to that of Vinding are made by Ludwig Raal, who is in favor of a more practical approach. He argues for introducing non-violent population control through immunocontraception. This would sustain the ecosystem and human population, and allow people to perform helpful interventions in nature.

=== Creation of artificial intelligence ===
Thomas Metzinger, Sander Beckers, and Bartłomiej Chomański argue against trying to create artificial intelligence as this could significantly increase the amount of suffering in the universe. David Benatar also says that his argumentation for not bringing others into existence is applicable to all sentient beings, including conscious machines.

=== Promortalism ===
Promortalism or pro-mortalism is the philosophical value judgment that death is always better than life. Pro-mortalism is related to negative utilitarianism.

A common motivation for pro-mortalism is to prevent the perceived future suffering of oneself and/or other sentient beings. Promortalism positively values death, whereas antinatalism negatively values birth, so both value judgments are distinct from each other. Antinatalism is generally supportive of abortion rights and anti-pro-life, while pro-mortalism and efilism are plainly anti-life.

Antinatalists and promortalists generally agree that if one accepts that life is suffering and no other premises are assumed, then antinatalism (ceasing the propagation of life) and promortalism (ending life) are both implied. As an analogy, if one believes that smoking causes harm, then not only should people not start smoking, but they should also stop if they already smoke.

Similarly, Jiwoon Hwang argued that the hedonistic interpretation of Benatar's asymmetry argument of harms and benefits entails promortalism – the view that it is always preferable to cease to exist than to continue to live. Hwang argues that the absence of pleasure is not bad in the following cases: for the one who never exists, for the one who exists, and for the one who ceased to exist. By "bad", we mean that it is not worse than the presence of pleasure for the one who exists. This is consistent with Benatar's statement that the presence of pleasure for the existing person is not an advantage over the absence of pleasure for the never existing and vice versa.

However, Benatar himself has argued that many arguments and premises besides antinatalism would be necessary in order for antinatalism to imply promortalism. Hence, antinatalism does not imply pro-mortalism by itself. It is possible to simultaneously support antinatalism and oppose promortalism. For example, an antinatalist who is also a rights theorist would support antinatalism while opposing murder on the basis that people have a right not to be killed or murdered. An antinatalist could also oppose promortalism by believing that it is worse for anyone to die earlier than they need to, or simply because it is troubling to kill people. An antinatalist can believe that while life is not worth starting, life can be worth continuing. The promortalist Jiwoon Hwang asserted:

"My pro-mortalism does not imply that it is obligatory or even permissible to kill other people without their consent, even painlessly and with good intent. There may be many reasons for this, such as autonomy and right to life."

— Jiwoon Hwang, "Why it is Always Better to Cease to Exist"

=== Distinction to human extinction ===
Émile P. Torres argues that, contra Benatar, antinatalism need not entail human extinction. For example, if people were to develop radical life-extension technologies that enable them to live as long as the human species itself could survive, procreation could cease entirely without the global population dwindling to zero.

== Criticism ==
=== Positive value of human life ===
Criticism of antinatalism comes from those that see positive value in bringing humans into existence. David Wasserman has criticized David Benatar's asymmetry argument and the consent argument. Psychologist Geoffrey Miller has argued that "all the research on human well-being shows almost everyone across cultures is well above neutral on happiness. Benatar is just empirically wrong that life is dominated by suffering." Massimo Pigliucci argues that Benatar's essential premise that pleasure is the only true inherent good and pain the only inherent evil is a flawed argument and refutable within the philosophy of Stoicism, which regards pleasure and pain as merely indifferents, and that moral virtues and vices should be the only guide of human action.

=== Decrease in suffering ===
Brian Tomasik challenges the effectiveness of human antinatalism in reducing suffering by pointing out that humans appropriate the habitats of wild animals thereby sparing wild animals from being born into lives containing suffering.

== See also ==
- Audianism
- Borborites
- Old-age dependency ratio
- Emil Cioran
- Human population planning
- Nihilism
- Nonidentity problem
- Philosophical pessimism
- Philosophy of suicide
- Population decline
- Population ethics
- The Possibility of an Island – 2005 novel by Michel Houellebecq
- Priscillianism
- Pro-natalism
- Silenus
- Voluntary childlessness
