= Emotional isolation =

State of isolation

Emotional isolation is a state of isolation where one may have an extensive or reliably available social network but still feels emotionally separated from others.

Population-based research indicates that one in five middle-aged and elderly men (50–80 years) in Sweden are emotionally isolated (defined as having no one in whom one can confide). Of those who do have someone in whom they can confide, eight out of ten confide only in their partner. People who have no one in whom they can confide are less likely to feel alert and strong, calm, energetic, and happy. Instead, they are more likely to feel depressed, sad, tired, and worn out. Many people suffering from this kind of isolation have strong social networks, but lack a significant bond with their friends. While they can build superficial friendships, they are often not able to confide in many people. People who are isolated emotionally usually feel lonely and unable to relate to others.

== In relationships ==
Emotional isolation can occur as a result of social isolation, or when a person lacks any close confidant or intimate partner. Even though social relationships are necessary for emotional well-being, they can trigger negative feelings and thoughts and emotional isolation can act as a defense mechanism to protect a person from emotional distress. When people are emotionally isolated, they keep their feelings completely to themselves, are unable to receive emotional support from others, feel "shut down" or numb, and are reluctant or unwilling to communicate with others, except perhaps for the most superficial matters. Emotional isolation can occur within an intimate relationship, particularly as a result of infidelity, abuse, or other trust issues. One or both partners may feel alone within the relationship, rather than supported and fulfilled. Identifying the source of the distress and working with a therapist to improve communication and rebuild trust can help couples re-establish their emotional bond.

== Effects on the mind ==
Cacioppo and his team have found that the brains of lonely people react differently than those with strong social networks. The University of Chicago researchers showed lonely and non-lonely subjects photographs of people in both pleasant settings and unpleasant settings. When viewing the pleasant pictures, non-lonely subjects showed much more activity in a section of the brain known as the ventral striatum than the lonely subjects. The ventral striatum plays an important role in learning. It is also part of the brain's reward center, and can be stimulated by rewards like food and love. The lonely subjects displayed far less activity in this region while viewing pleasant pictures, and they also had less brain activity when shown the unpleasant pictures. When non-lonely subjects viewed the unpleasant pictures, they demonstrated activity in the temporoparietal junction, an area of the brain associated with empathy; the lonely subjects had a lesser response [source: University of Chicago].

Social withdrawal is avoiding people and activities one would usually enjoy. For some people, this can progress to a point of social isolation, where people may even want to avoid contact with family and close friends most of the time. They may want to be alone because they feel it is tiring or upsetting to be with other people. Sometimes a cycle can develop where the more time they spend alone, the less they feel like people understand them. When people withdraw themselves from social interaction they tend to stay inside a set place (like a bedroom).

== See also ==
- Loner
- Solitude
