= Thomas Ligotti =

American horror author

- Born: July 9, 1953 (age 73); Detroit, Michigan, U.S.
- Education: Wayne State University
- Occupation: Writer
- Writing career
- Period: 1981–present
- Genres: Horror fiction, weird fiction, dark fantasy

Signature
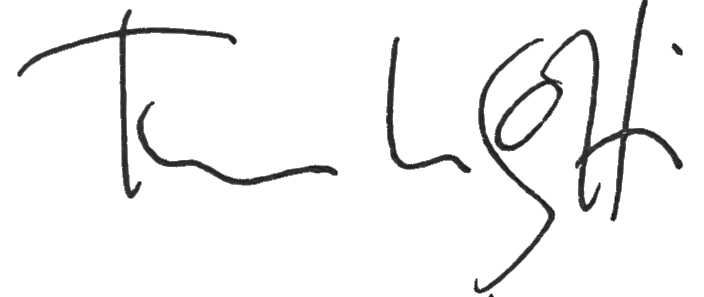

Thomas Ligotti (born July 9, 1953) is an American horror author, philosopher, and writer. His writings are rooted in several literary genres – most prominently weird fiction – and have been described by critics as works of philosophical horror, often formed into short stories and novellas in the tradition of gothic fiction. The worldview espoused by Ligotti in his fiction and non-fiction has been described as pessimistic and nihilistic. The Washington Post called him "the best kept secret in contemporary horror fiction."

== Career ==
Ligotti started his professional writing career in the early 1980s with short stories published in American small press magazines. He was contributing editor to Grimoire from 1982 to 1985. In 2015, Ligotti's first two collections, Songs of a Dead Dreamer and Grimscribe: His Lives and Works, were republished in one volume by Penguin Classics as Songs of a Dead Dreamer and Grimscribe. Michael Calia of The Wall Street Journal wrote of the reprint that "Horror writer Thomas Ligotti is about to enter the American literary canon. Penguin Classics published a volume of Mr. Ligotti’s short stories, making him one of 10 living writers, including Thomas Pynchon and Don DeLillo, among the hundreds the imprint has published in the U.S." Ligotti's work received high praise following the publication from the likes of The New York Times Book Review, the Los Angeles Review of Books, The Washington Post, and The New Yorker. Terrence Rafferty contrasts Ligotti with Stephen King, observing, "King, the great entertainer, needs the story as the comedian needs the joke, and when he can’t quite deliver it he dies (in the comedian’s sense). King is a master of horror, though. When inspiration fails, he has the technique to fake it. Thomas Ligotti is a master of a different order, practically a different species. He probably couldn’t fake it if he tried, and he never tries. He writes like horror incarnate."

Ligotti collaborated with the musical group Current 93 on the albums In a Foreign Town, In a Foreign Land (1997, reissued 2002), I Have a Special Plan for This World (2000), This Degenerate Little Town (2001) and The Unholy City (2003), all released on David Tibet's Durtro label. Tibet has also published several limited editions of Ligotti's books on Durtro Press. Additionally, Ligotti played guitar on Current 93's contribution to the compilation album Foxtrot, whose proceeds went to the treatment of musician John Balance's alcoholism.

== Personal life ==
He has cited Thomas Bernhard, William S. Burroughs, Emil Cioran, Vladimir Nabokov, Edgar Allan Poe, Giacomo Leopardi, Samuel Beckett, Franz Kafka, and Bruno Schulz as being among his favorite writers. H. P. Lovecraft is also an important touchstone for Ligotti: a few stories, "The Sect of the Idiot" in particular, make explicit reference to Lovecraft's Cthulhu Mythos, and one, "The Last Feast of Harlequin", was dedicated to Lovecraft. Also among his avowed influences are Algernon Blackwood, M. R. James, and Arthur Machen, all fin de siècle horror authors known for their subtlety and implications of the cosmic and supernatural in their stories. He has also invoked the influence of philosophers such as Arthur Schopenhauer and Peter Wessel Zapffe.

Ligotti has suffered from chronic anxiety and anhedonia for much of his life; these have been prominent themes in his work. Ligotti avoids the explicit violence common in some recent horror fiction, preferring to establish a disquieting, pessimistic atmosphere through the use of subtlety and repetition. Ligotti has stated he prefers short stories to longer forms, both as a reader and as a writer, though he has written a novella, My Work Is Not Yet Done (2002).

Ligotti's ancestry is three-quarters Sicilian, one-quarter Polish, a genetic combination he likes to think "contributed to the bizarre quality of my imagination and to what has been called its 'universality'." He says that his Polish grandmother's stories, though not horrific, "put me in touch with an older and stranger world than I would otherwise have known and that emerged when I started writing stories so many years later".

Ligotti attended Macomb County Community College between 1971 and 1973 and graduated from Wayne State University in 1978. For 23 years Ligotti worked as an Associate Editor at Gale Research (now the Gale Group), a publishing company that produces compilations of literary (and other) research. In the summer of 2001, Ligotti quit his job at the Gale Group and moved to south Florida. Politically, he identifies as a socialist.

Ligotti has described himself as an atheist.

== Influence ==
He has been influenced by the "first-person voice in which Nabokov wrote" and the "densely metaphorical style of Bruno Schulz".

In 2003, Wildside Press published The Thomas Ligotti Reader: Essays and Explorations, a collection of essays about Ligotti's work edited by Darrell Schweitzer.

Author Jeff VanderMeer has penned numerous pieces praising Ligotti's writing, including the introduction to the Penguin Classics edition of Songs of a Dead Dreamer and Grimscribe.

In 2014, the HBO television series True Detective attracted attention from some of Ligotti's fans because of the resemblance of the pessimistic, antinatalist philosophy espoused in the first few episodes by the character of Rust Cohle (played by Matthew McConaughey) and Ligotti's own philosophical pessimism and antinatalism, especially as expressed in The Conspiracy Against the Human Race. After accusations that dialogue from Cohle's character in True Detective were lifted from The Conspiracy Against the Human Race, the series' writer, Nic Pizzolatto, confirmed in The Wall Street Journal that Ligotti, along with several other writers and texts in the weird supernatural horror genre, had indeed influenced him. Pizzolatto said he found The Conspiracy Against the Human Race to be "incredibly powerful writing". On the topic of hard-boiled detectives, he asked: "What could be more hardboiled than the worldview of Ligotti or [Emil] Cioran?"

The writing of Ligotti and Eugene Thacker is cited as an influence on the 2021 album The Nightmare of Being by the Gothenburg melodic death metal band At the Gates.

== Selected bibliography ==
Collections

- Songs of a Dead Dreamer (1986)
- Grimscribe: His Lives and Works (1991)
- Noctuary (1994)
- The Agonising Resurrection of Victor Frankenstein and Other Gothic Tales (1994)
- The Nightmare Factory (1996)
- In a Foreign Town, in a Foreign Land (1997)
- The Shadow at the Bottom of the World (2005)
- Teatro Grottesco (2006)
- The Spectral Link (2014)

Novella

- My Work Is Not Yet Done (2002)

Non-fiction

- The Conspiracy Against the Human Race (2010)

Poetry

- Death Poems (2004)
- Pictures of Apocalypse (2023)

== Full bibliography ==
- Songs of a Dead Dreamer (1986, rev. & exp. 1989)
- Grimscribe: His Lives and Works (1991)
- Noctuary (1994)
- The Agonizing Resurrection of Victor Frankenstein and Other Gothic Tales (1994)
- The Nightmare Factory (1996). Essentially an omnibus of selections from Ligotti's first three collections, with a concluding section containing new stories. All of the stories in the concluding section were later printed in Teatro Grottesco.
- In a Foreign Town, in a Foreign Land (1997, accompanying CD by Current 93)
- I Have a Special Plan for This World (2000, accompanying CD by Current 93)
- This Degenerate Little Town (2001, accompanying CD by Current 93)
- My Work Is Not Yet Done: Three Tales of Corporate Horror (2002)
- Crampton: A Screenplay (2003, with Brandon Trenz) (Unproduced screenplay written in 1998 for an episode of The X-Files)
- Sideshow, and Other Stories (2003)
- The Unholy City (2003, Words and music Thomas Ligotti)
- Death Poems (2004)
- The Shadow at the Bottom of the World (2005)
- Teatro Grottesco (2006, reprinted in 2008)
- The Conspiracy Against the Human Race (2010)
- The Spectral Link (2014)
- Born to Fear: Interviews with Thomas Ligotti (2014), edited by Matt Cardin
- Songs of a Dead Dreamer & Grimscribe (2015)
- The Small People (2021). A chapbook reprint of a single story previously collected in The Spectral Link.
- Paradoxes From Hell (2021). A chapbook reprint of a previously uncollected story and two poems.
- Pictures of Apocalypse (2023). A collection of 20 new poems.

== Adaptations ==
Graphic novels

- The Nightmare Factory (2007)
- The Nightmare Factory – Volume 2 (2008)

== Awards ==
- 1982: Small Press Writers and Artists Organization, Best Author of Horror/Weird Fiction: The Chymist
- 1986: Rhysling Award, from Science Fiction Poetry Association (nomination): One Thousand Painful Variations Performed Upon Divers Creatures Undergoing the Treatment of Dr. Moreau, Humanist
- 1991: World Fantasy Award for Best Short Fiction (nomination): The Last Feast of Harlequin
- 1992: World Fantasy Award for Best Collection (nomination): Grimscribe: His Lives and Works
- 1997: World Fantasy Award for Best Collection (nomination): The Nightmare Factory
- 1995: Bram Stoker Award for Best Short Fiction (nomination): The Bungalow House
- 1996: Bram Stoker Award for Best Fiction Collection: The Nightmare Factory
- 1996: Bram Stoker Award for Best Long Fiction: The Red Tower
- 1996: British Fantasy Award for Best Fiction Collection: The Nightmare Factory
- 2002: Bram Stoker Award for Best Long Fiction: My Work Is Not Yet Done
- 2002: International Horror Guild Award, Long Form Category: My Work Is Not Yet Done
- 2010: Bram Stoker Award for Superior Achievement in Nonfiction (nomination) The Conspiracy Against the Human Race
- 2019: Bram Stoker Award for Lifetime Achievement
