= History of philosophical pessimism =

History of a philosophical school

Philosophical pessimism is a philosophical school that is critical of existence, emphasizing the inherent suffering and futility of life. This perspective can be traced back to various religious traditions and philosophical writings throughout history. Pessimism, in this context, is not merely a negative psychological outlook, but a philosophical stance that questions the fundamental value or worth of existence.

Notable early expressions of pessimistic thought can be found in the works of ancient philosophers such as Hegesias of Cyrene, who lived in Greece during the 3rd century BCE and was known for his teachings on the benefits of suicide. In the Eastern philosophical tradition, the Indian texts of Buddhism, particularly the Four Noble Truths, which acknowledge the existence of suffering (duḥkha) as a fundamental aspect of life, also reflect a pessimistic worldview. These early expressions laid the groundwork for more systematic and articulated forms of pessimism that would emerge later.

The modern discourse on philosophical pessimism is significantly shaped by the German philosopher Arthur Schopenhauer. Schopenhauer's ideas in the 19th century articulated a systematic critique of philosophical optimism, which had dominated Western thought since the Enlightenment, particularly with figures such as Gottfried Wilhelm Leibniz and Alexander Pope.

Schopenhauer's seminal work, "The World as Will and Representation," presents a grim view of existence, arguing that reality is driven by an insatiable and ceaseless metaphysical force which he called Will (which manifests in living creatures as the will to life — or the instinct of self-preservation), and that the world is thus fundamentally a place of perpetual suffering and dissatisfaction. His pessimistic philosophy has had a profound impact on subsequent thinkers, artists, scientists, and many others; and continues to influence contemporary discussions on the meaning and value of life.

Following Schopenhauer, subsequent thinkers such as Emil Cioran and David Benatar further developed pessimistic thought and challenged optimistic stances. Emil Cioran, a 20th-century Romanian philosopher and essayist, is known for his bleak reflections on the human condition. His works, such as "On the Heights of Despair," explore themes such as existence as an exile, the torment of self-awareness, and scorn for metaphysical systems and religious consolations — all expressed with an intensely lyrical tone. David Benatar, a contemporary South African philosopher, has further contributed to the modern discourse on pessimism through his books "Better Never to Have Been: The Harm of Coming into Existence" and The Human Predicament: A Candid Guide to Life's Biggest Questions". Benatar argues that coming into existence is always a net harm because it subjects individuals to a life filled with suffering and pain, even if it also contains moments of pleasure.

== In religion ==
=== Buddhism ===
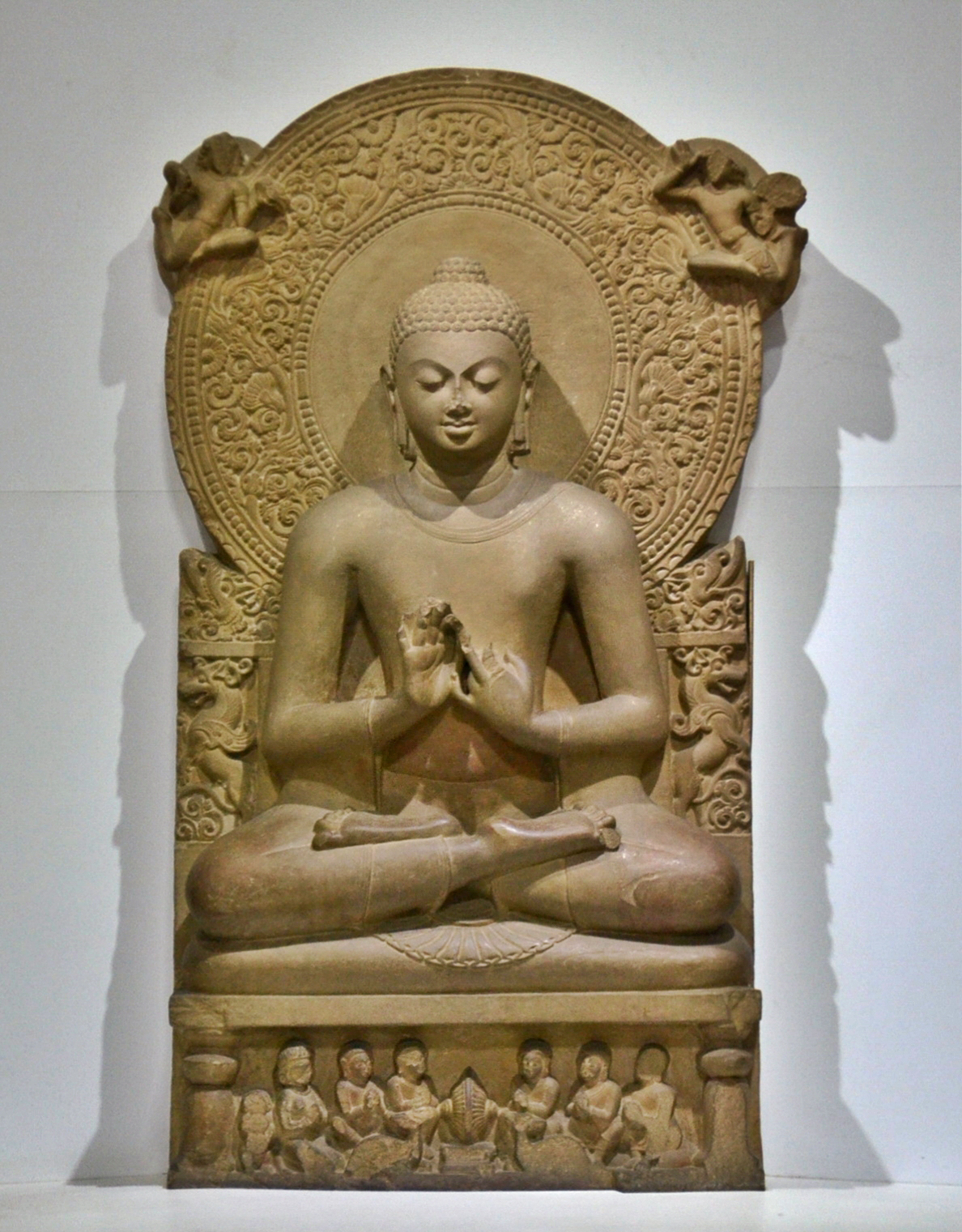
Statue of the Buddha.

Historically, philosophical pessimism seems to have first presented itself in the East, under the partly religious aspect of Buddhism. In the Dhammacakkappavattana Sutta, Gautama Buddha establishes the first noble truth of duḥkha, or suffering, as the fundamental mark of existence:

Now this, bhikkhus, is the noble truth of suffering: birth is suffering, aging is suffering, illness is suffering, death is suffering; union with what is displeasing is suffering; separation from what is pleasing is suffering; not to get what one wants is suffering; in brief, the five aggregates subject to clinging are suffering.

This would have exerted a certain influence on Greco-Roman philosophy from the Ptolemaic period onwards, in particular on the pessimistic doctrine of Hegesias of Cyrene. This thesis is notably advanced by Jean-Marie Guyau, who in the middle of the controversy about German pessimism (1870–1890) detects in Hegesias's philosophy the pessimistic theme of Buddhism, which he sees as a "palliative of life"; he summarizes it as follows:

Most often, hope brings with it disappointment, enjoyment produces satiety and disgust; in life, the sum of sorrows is greater than that of pleasures; to seek happiness, or only pleasure, is therefore vain and contradictory, since in reality, one will always find a surplus of sorrows; what one must tend to is only to avoid sorrow; now, in order to feel less sorrow, there is only one way: to make oneself indifferent to the pleasures themselves and to what produces them, to blunt sensitivity, to annihilate desire. Indifference, renunciation, here is thus the only palliative of life.

=== Judaism and Christianity ===
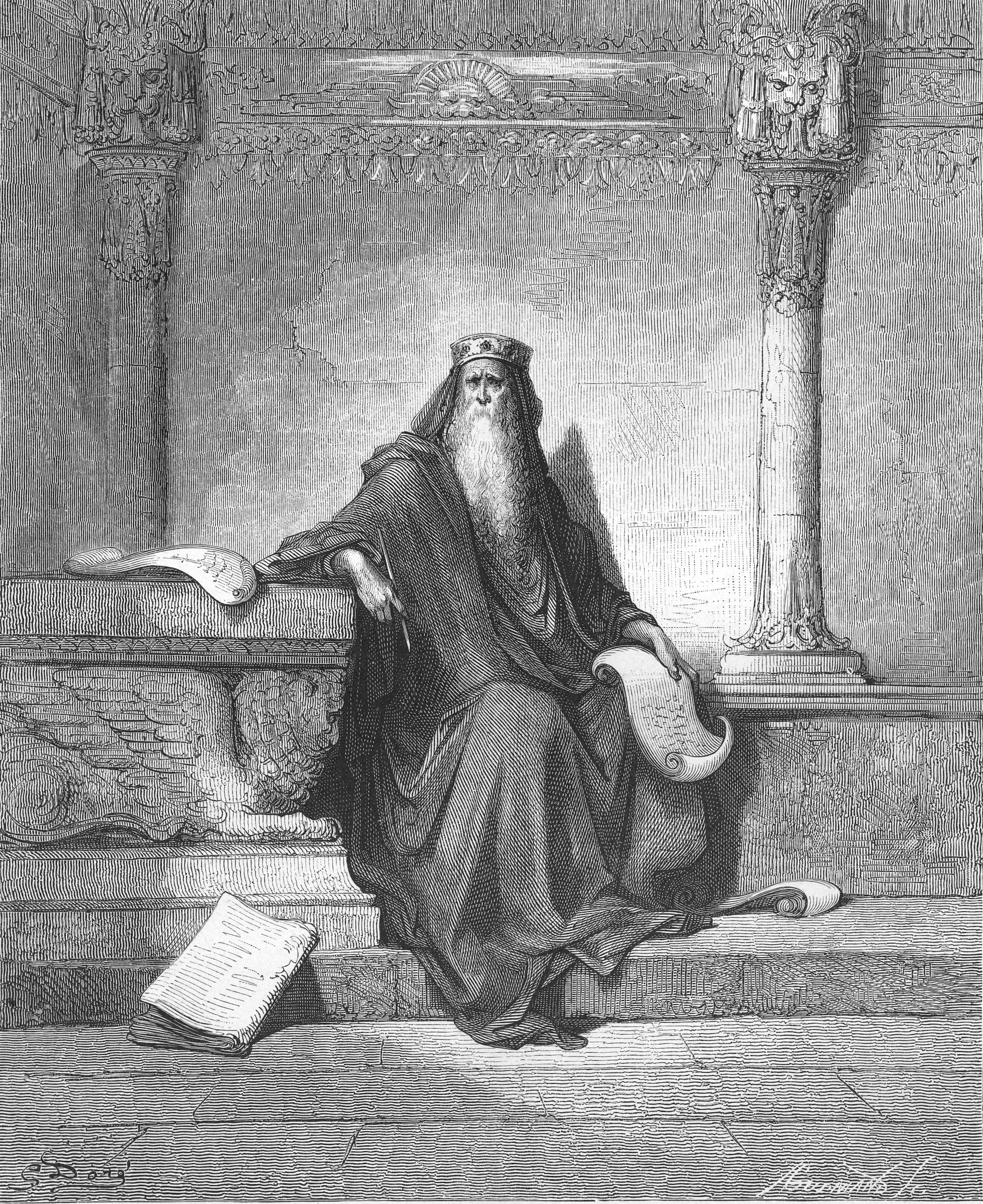
King Solomon, who was traditionally considered to be the author of Ecclesiastes.

The Ecclesiastes is a piece of wisdom literature from the Old Testament. In chapter 1, the author expresses his view towards the vanity (or meaninglessness) of human endeavors in life.

Death is a major component of the author's pessimism. Though he views wisdom as more valuable than folly, death essentially vitiates its superiority, and because of this the author comes to abhor life.

In chapter 4, the author also expresses antinatalistic thoughts; articulating that, better than those who are already dead, is he who has not yet been born.

Some parallels have been made between the Book of Ecclesiastes and an ancient Mesopotamian literary composition named the Dialogue of Pessimism, composed around 1500 BCE in ancient Mesopotamia. Taking the form of a dialogue between a master and slave, the master in the exchange cannot decide on any course of action, giving orders to his slave before immediately cancelling them and driving him to the point of desperation, which has been interpreted as an expression of the futility of human actions.

In the Bible, Jesus sometimes showed doubts about the value of the world, for example, in the Gospel of John: "If you belonged to the world, the world would love you as its own. Because you do not belong to the world, but I have chosen you out of the world—therefore the world hates you."

=== Gnosticism ===
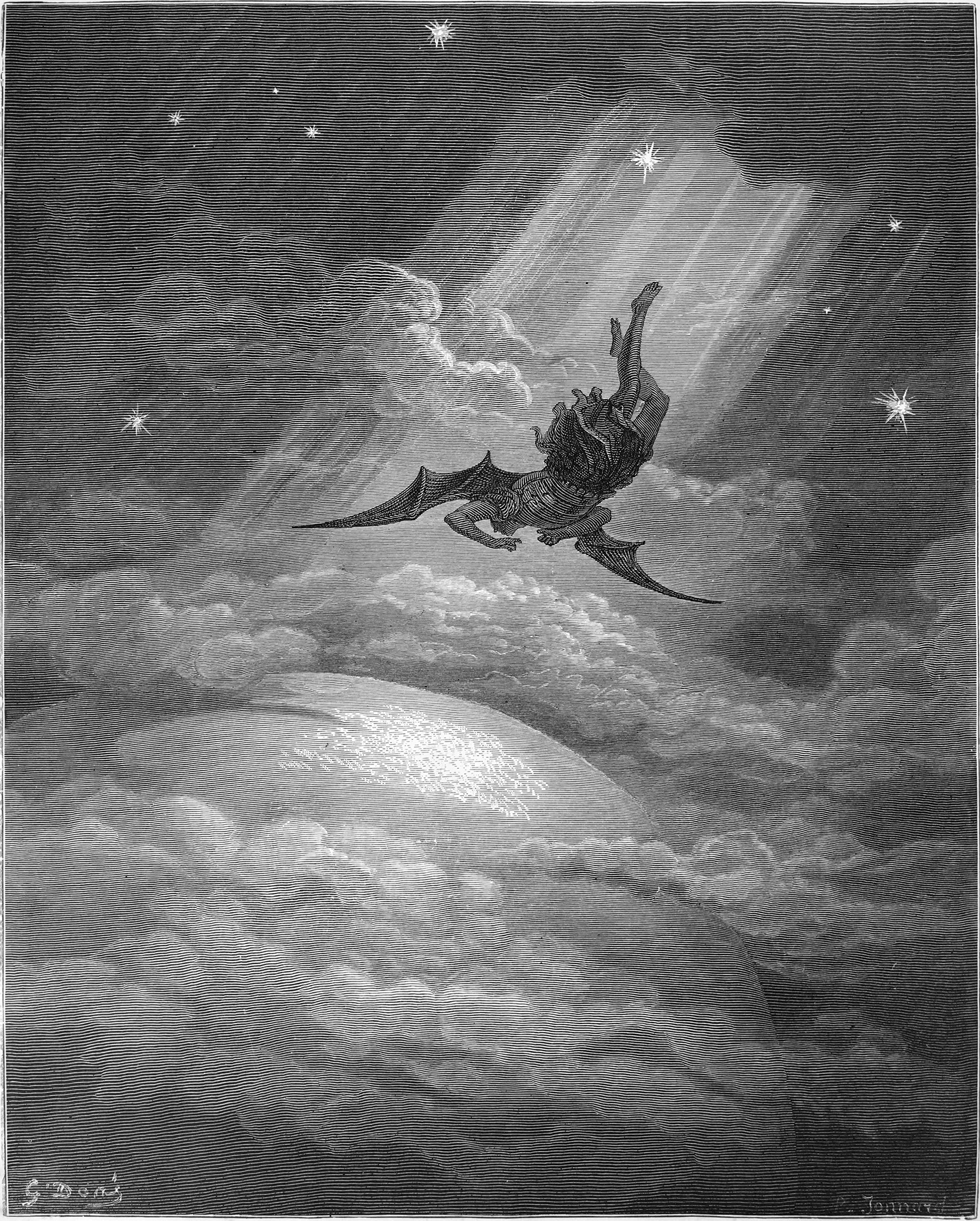
Gustave Doré's 1866 illustration for Milton's Paradise Lost. For the Gnostics, man has been "thrown" into the world where he is condemned to live in humiliation and suffering.

Gnosticism is a complex religious movement steeped in Greco-Latin philosophy, most often claiming to be "true" Christianity, although it is considered heretical by Christian churches. It is characterized by a philosophy of salvation based on "gnosis" (spiritual knowledge), in other words on the knowledge of the divine, and by its denigration of the earthly world, created by an evil power. In general, the gnostic considers his body negatively: it is the "prison", the "tomb", or the "corpse" where his authentic self has been locked up. It is a foreign thing that must be endured, an "unwanted companion" or an "intruder" that drags the spirit down, plunging it into the degrading oblivion of its origin. The flesh is interpreted in this sense as a state of humiliation and suffering engendered by a demonic force, perverted or weakened, lurking in matter. This state condemns all men to live in a kind of hell which is none other than the sensible world. The pessimistic vision of the Gnostics extends to all the cosmos, conceived as a failed work, even fatal or criminal. Man is "thrown" into it, then locked up without hope.

In Gnostic thought, the problem of evil is a nagging question which leads to the adoption of a dualistic perspective. Indeed, the gnostic is led either to oppose God and the spirit to matter or to an evil principle, or else to distinguish from the transcendent God, unknown or foreign to the world and absolutely good, an inferior or malevolent god, creator of the world and of bodies. In this last case, the divine, rejected entirely out of the sensible, only remains in the "luminous" part of the human soul, extinguished however in the great majority of men. In addition to affirming the intrinsically evil character of the world, the Gnostic conceives it as hermetically sealed, surrounded by "outer darkness", by a "great sea" or by an "iron wall" identified with the firmament. Not only is it fortified against God, but God himself has been forced to fortify himself against the world's reach. Inexorable barriers thus oppose the escape of the soul from the earthly realm.

Inhabited by the feeling of being a stranger to the world, where he has been made to fall, the gnostic discovers that he is in essence a native of a beyond, although his body and his lower passions belong to this world. He then understands that he is of the race (genos) of the chosen ones, superior and "hypercosmic" beings. If he desperately yearns for an afterlife, it is because he experiences within himself a throbbing nostalgia for the original homeland from which he has fallen. This longing affects the upper part of his soul, which is a divine principle in exile here on earth, and which can only be saved by the recognition of its original origin—gnosis proper. Those whose higher part of the soul has remained extinct, or who are devoid of it, that is to say, all the individuals whom the Gnostics call hylics (the majority of human beings and all animals), are condemned to destruction or to wander in this world, undergoing the terrifying cycle of reincarnations.

== Ancient Greece ==
=== Hegesias of Cyrene ===
Hegesias of Cyrene was a Greek philosopher born in Cyrene, Libya, around the year 290 BC. He came from the dual Socratic and hedonistic tradition of the Cyrenaic school, but is clearly distinguished from it by the radical philosophical pessimism attributed to him. All his writings have been lost and we only know of his philosophy through what Diogenes Laërtius says about him, who considered him as "the advocate of suicide". Laërtius first lends to Hegesias the explicit affirmation of the impossibility of happiness: like later philosophical pessimists, Hegesias argued that lasting happiness is impossible to achieve and that all we can do is to try to avoid pain as much as possible:

Complete happiness cannot possibly exist; for that the body is full of many sensations, and that the mind sympathizes with the body, and is troubled when that is troubled, and also that fortune prevents many things which we cherished in anticipation; so that for all these reasons, perfect happiness eludes our grasp.

Hegesias held that all external objects, events, and actions are indifferent to the wise man, even death: "for the foolish person it is expedient to live, but to the wise person it is a matter of indifference". According to Cicero, Hegesias wrote a book called Death by Starvation (Greek: ἀποκαρτερῶν), which supposedly persuaded many people that death was more desirable than life – consequently earning him the nickname Death-persuader (Greek: πεισιθάνατος). Because of this, Ptolemy II Philadelphus banned Hegesias from teaching in Alexandria.

== Middle Ages ==
Al-Ma'arri and Omar Khayyam are two medieval writers noted for their expression of a philosophically pessimistic worldview in their poetry. Al-Ma'arri held an antinatalist view, in line with his pessimism, arguing that children should not be born to spare them of the pains and suffering of life. Khayyam echoes this sentiment, suggesting that happiness lies in not being born at all. Al-Ma'arri's personal experiences, including his sightlessness and the philosophical influences of his time, further shaped his outlook on life.

In contrast, Omar Khayyam, while also expressing pessimistic sentiments, sometimes intersperses his reflections with moments of hedonistic celebration. Khayyam's early loss of his father and the subsequent hardships he experienced contributed to his pessimism, as did his awareness of the decline of intellectual and scientific achievements in the Islamic world at the time.

Both poets articulate a shared belief that life is fraught with pain and suffering. Their poetry reveals a mutual understanding of the world as a place of despair, where death is seen as a release from life's burdens; although Khayyam in particular encourages the enjoyment of life's fleeting pleasures despite its inherent sorrows.

Moreover, both poets express skepticism towards religion and its leaders, viewing them as instruments of oppression rather than sources of solace. Al-Ma'arri critiques the hypocrisy of religious figures, while Khayyam questions the nature of divine justice in a world filled with suffering. Their shared disdain for societal norms extends to their views on friendship and marriage, where both poets express mistrust and pessimism about human relationships.

== 17th century ==
=== Baltasar Gracián ===
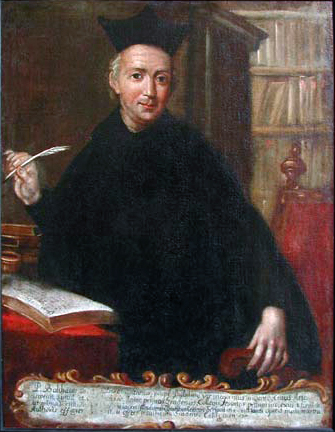
Gracián saw the world as filled with deception, duplicity, and disillusionment.

Baltasar Gracián's novel El Criticón ("The Critic") is considered to be an extended allegory of the human search for happiness which turns out to be fruitless on Earth; the novel paints a bleak and desolate picture of the human condition.

His book of aphorisms, The Pocket Oracle and Art of Prudence ("Oráculo Manual y Arte de Prudencia") deals with the cultural ideal of desengaño, which is commonly translated as disenchantment or disillusionment. However, Gracian is said to have asserted that the journey of life is one where a person loses the misconceptions of the world, but not the illusions. Jennifer A. Herdt argues that Gracian held that "what the world values is deceptive simply because it appears solid and lasting but is in fact impermanent and transitory. Having realized this, we turn from the pursuit of things that pass away and strive to grasp those that do not."

Arthur Schopenhauer engaged extensively with Gracián's works and considered El Criticón "Absolutely unique ... a book made for constant use ... a companion for life ... [for] those who wish to prosper in the great world". Schopenhauer's pessimistic outlook was influenced by Gracián, and he translated The Pocket Oracle and Art of Prudence into German. He praised Gracián for his aphoristic writing style (conceptismo) and often quoted him in his works.

=== Blaise Pascal ===
Blaise Pascal approached pessimism from a Christian perspective. He is noted for publishing the Pensées, a pessimistic series of aphorisms with the intention to highlight the misery of the human condition and turn people towards the salvation of the Catholic Church and God.

A mathematician and physicist of the first order, Pascal turned more and more to religion and faith since a mystical experience he had at the age of thirty. Embracing the Jansenist current of Christianity, he considered that man is condemned, as a result of the original sin, to perpetual misery. This misery we seek by all means to evade: "Being unable to cure death, wretchedness and ignorance, men have decided, in order to be happy, not to think about such things". In order to forget our condition, not only do we limit our thoughts to the consideration of futile things, but we multiply our gesticulations and vain activities. The will which pushes us thus towards the inessential belongs to what Pascal calls "diversion". Any life that does not involve the thought of its finitude is a life of diversion that leads away from God. Diversion takes extremely varied forms and a very large place in our ordinary existence. Pascal affirms that if the only thing that consoles us from our miseries is indeed diversion, it is also "the greatest of our miseries".

For Pascal, action is necessarily subject to diversion and it is therefore in thought, and not in action, that all our dignity resides. But the thought in question is not that of the geometer, the physicist or the philosopher who, more often than not, feeds on pride and leads away from God. It is the introspective discovery and knowledge of our finitude, which alone can raise us above other creatures and bring us closer to God. "Man is only a reed, the weakest in nature, but he is a thinking reed", declares in this sense Pascal in a famous maxim. Thought is an essence of man to which he owes his greatness, but only insofar as it reveals to him his finitude. The Christian idea of man's irretrievability is therefore not only a truth, but a belief that must be adopted, because it alone gives human existence a certain dignity. Pascal promotes in this perspective a reflexive form of pessimism, linking greatness and misery, where the disconsideration of oneself and the recognition of our impotence raise us above ourselves, making us renounce at the same time the vain search for happiness.

== 18th century ==
=== Voltaire ===
In response to the 1755 Lisbon earthquake, Voltaire published in the following year (1756) the pessimistic "Poème sur le désastre de Lisbonne" ("Poem on the Lisbon Disaster"), which critiqued Alexander Pope's optimistic axiom in the poem "An Essay on Man" (1733–1734), according to which, "Whatever is, is right"; Voltaire had initially praised Pope's poem, but later in life became critical of Pope's expressed worldview. "Poème sur le désastre de Lisbonne" is especially pessimistic about the state of mankind and the nature of God. In response to the poem, Jean-Jacques Rousseau sent Voltaire a letter asserting that "all human ills are the result of human faults".

Voltaire was the first European to be labeled as a pessimist by his critics, in response to the publication and international success of his 1759 satirical novel Candide; a treatise against Leibniz's theistic optimism, refuting his affirmation that "we live in the best of all possible worlds." Though himself a Deist, Voltaire argued against the existence of a compassionate personal God through his interpretation of the problem of evil.

== 19th century ==
=== Giacomo Leopardi ===
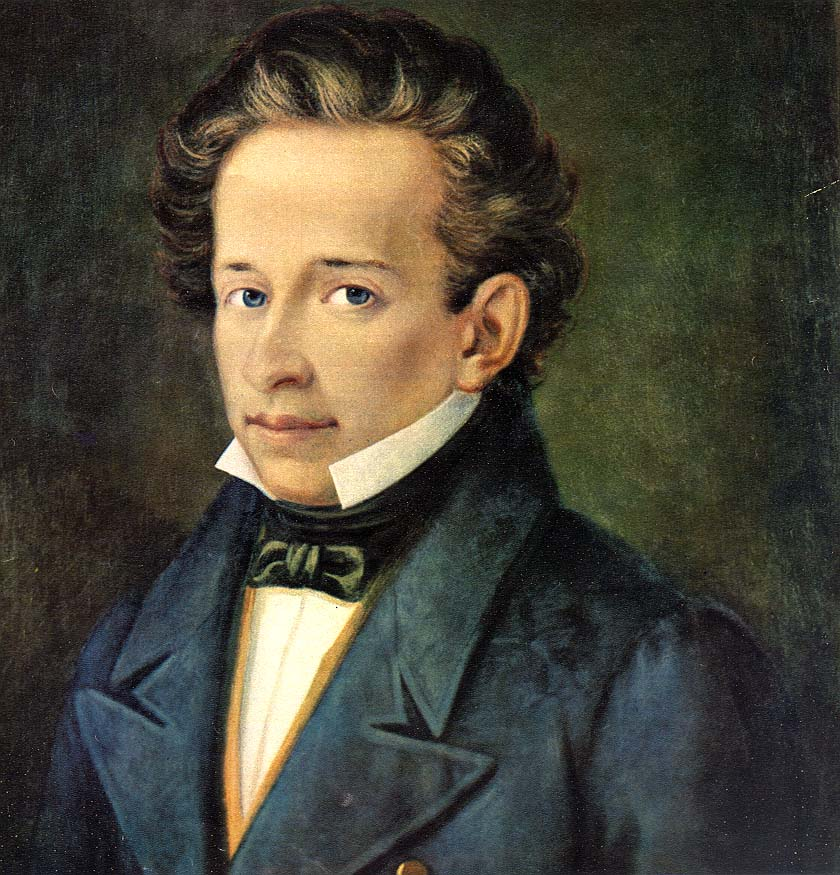
Giacomo Leopardi's pessimism has been labeled as "cosmic pessimism", or the belief in the radical and irreparable unhappiness of man.

Though a lesser-known figure outside Italy, Giacomo Leopardi was highly influential in the 19th century, especially on Schopenhauer and Nietzsche. In Leopardi's darkly comic essays, aphorisms, fables and parables, life is often described as a sort of divine joke or mistake. For Leopardi, humans have an unlimited desire for pleasure, which cannot however be satisfied by any specific joy. In this perspective, the existential problem for human beings emerges in the actual desire for particular existent pleasures, for these are all finite and thus cannot satisfy the desire for the infinite.

Going against the Socratic view present ever since Plato's dialogues, which associates wisdom or knowledge with happiness, Leopardi claims that philosophy, by putting an end to false opinions and ignorance, reveals to humans truths that are opposed to their happiness: "Those who say and preach that the perfection of man consists in the knowledge of truth and that all his ills come from false opinions and from ignorance are quite wrong. And so are those who say that the human race will finally be happy when all or the great majority of men know the truth and organize and govern their lives according to its norms." For Leopardi, the ultimate conclusion that philosophizing leads us to is that, paradoxically, we must not philosophize. Such conclusion, however, can only be learned at one's own expense, and even once it has been learned it can't be put in operation because "it is not in the power of men to forget the truths they know and because one can more easily lay aside any other habit than that of philosophizing. In short, philosophy starts out by hoping and promising to cure our ills and ends up by desiring in vain to find a remedy for itself."

Leopardi regarded nature itself as antagonistic to the happiness of man and all other creatures. In his "Dialogue Between Nature and an Icelander", the titular Icelander relates how, in his attempt to escape from suffering, he found himself attacked by severe weather, natural disasters, other animals, diseases, and aging. At the end of the dialogue, the Icelander asks Nature: "For whose pleasure and service is this wretched life of the world maintained, by the suffering and death of all the beings which compose it?", to which Nature does not directly give a response; instead, two famished lions suddenly appear and devour the Icelander, thus gaining the strength to live another day.

Leopardi's response to these conditions was to face up to these realities and try to live a vibrant and great life, to be risky and take up uncertain tasks. He asserted that this uncertainty makes life valuable and exciting, but does not free humans from suffering; it is rather an abandonment of the futile pursuit of happiness. He used the example of Christopher Columbus who went on a dangerous and uncertain voyage and because of this grew to appreciate life more fully. Leopardi also saw the capacity of humans to laugh at their condition as a laudable quality that can help them deal with their predicament: "He who has the courage to laugh is master of the world, much like him who is prepared to die."

== German pessimism ==
Although the first manifestations of philosophical pessimism date back to antiquity, never before did it take such a systematic turn and been so reflected upon as in Germany during the second half of the nineteenth century. For almost fifty years, the issue of pessimism was discussed in the context of Weltschmerz. The question of pessimism dominated German philosophical thought, and the "pessimism controversy" was its major point of dispute. The discussion that took place in Germany around this movement largely agreed on what constituted its central thesis: the negative value of existence.

=== Arthur Schopenhauer ===
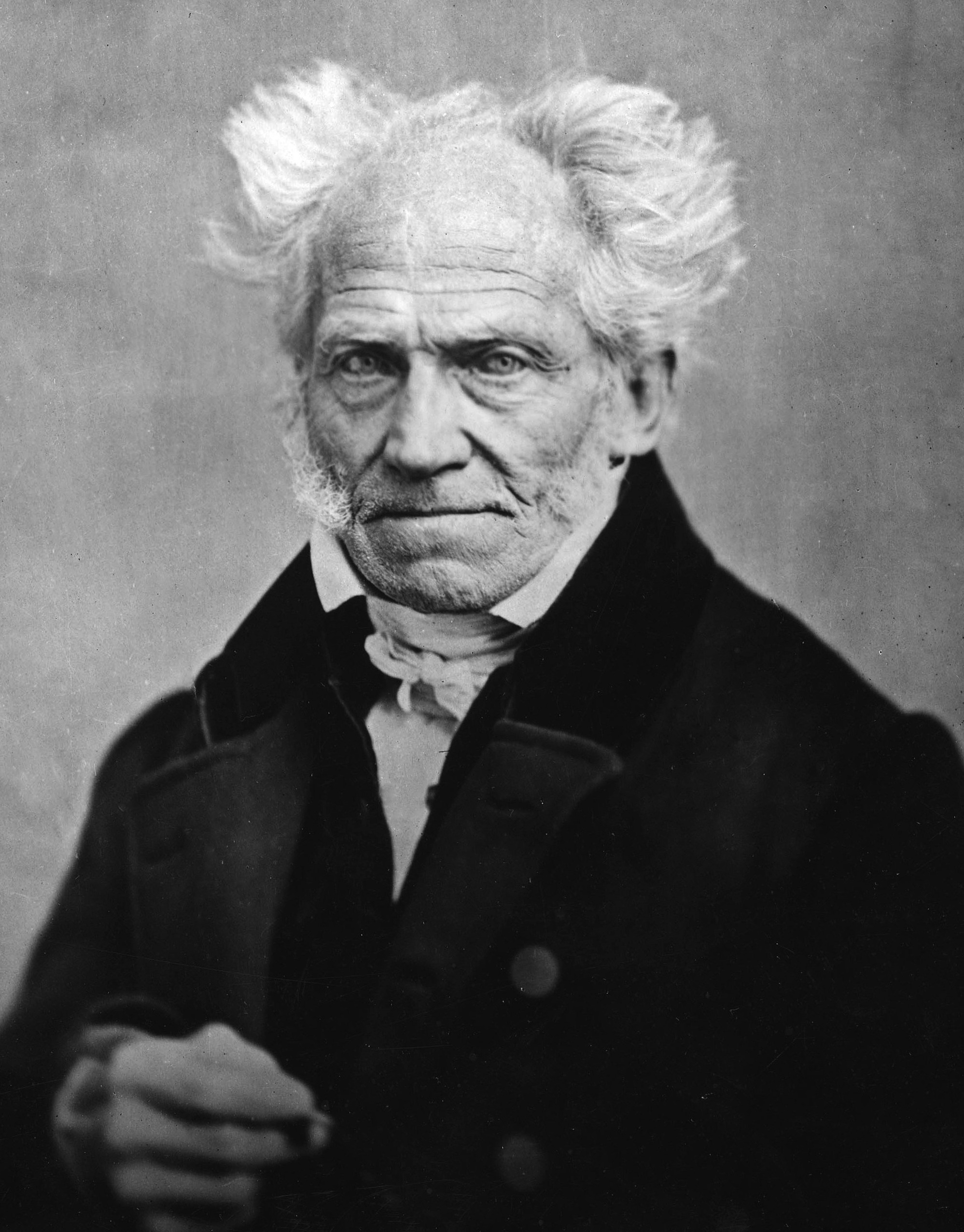
Arthur Schopenhauer considered the world to be the product of an irrational and insatiable metaphysical force which he called Will.

The first presentation of philosophical pessimism in a systematic manner, with an entire structure of metaphysics underlying it, was introduced by German philosopher Arthur Schopenhauer in the 19th century. Schopenhauer's pessimism came from his analysis of life being the product of an insatiable and incessant cosmic Will. He considered the Will to be the ultimate metaphysical animating noumenon, describing it as an aimless, restless and unquenchable striving that encompasses both the inorganic and organic realms, with its most intuitive and direct perception attainable through the observation of one's own body and desires.

Schopenhauer saw human reason as weak and insignificant compared to Will; in one metaphor, he compared the human intellect to a sighted lame man, who rides on the shoulders of a strong but blind man (the Will). He noted that, once one's desires are satiated, the feeling of satisfaction does not last for long, being merely the starting-point of new desires, and that, as a result, humans spend most of their lives in a state of endless striving; in this sense, they are, deep down, nothing but Will. Even the moments of satisfaction, when attained and not immediately giving way to new wants and longings, only lead one to an abandonment to boredom, which for Schopenhauer is a direct proof that existence has no real worth in itself.

Moreover, Schopenhauer argued that the world itself, and especially biological life or the organic realm, is a war of all against all, filled with constant strife and struggle; not merely boredom and unsatisfied desires. In such struggle, each different manifestation or "objectivation" of the Will contests with one another in order to maintain its own Idea by constantly overpowering the "lower" ones.. He also asserted that pleasure and pain were asymmetrical: pleasure has a negative nature, while pain is positive. By this Schopenhauer meant that pleasure does not come to us originally and of itself; that is, pleasure is only able to exist as a removal of a pre-existing pain or want, while pain directly and immediately proclaims itself to our perception.

Regarding old age and death, to which every life necessarily hurries, Schopenhauer described them as a sentence of condemnation from nature itself on each particular manifestation of the will to life, indicating that the whole striving of every manifestation is bound to frustrate itself and is essentially empty and vain, for if we were something valuable in itself, or unconditioned and absolute, we would not have infirmity and non-existence as our goal.

Schopenhauer saw in artistic contemplation a temporary escape from the act of willing. He believed that through "losing oneself" in art one could sublimate the Will. However, he believed that only resignation from the pointless striving of the will to life through a form of asceticism, which he interpreted as a "mortification of the will" or the "negation of the will to life" (as those practiced by eastern monastics and by "saints and ascetics") could free oneself from the Will altogether.

Schopenhauer never used the term pessimism to describe his philosophy but he also did not object when others called it that. Other terms used to describe his thought are voluntarism and irrationalism, which he also never used.

=== Post-Schopenhauerian pessimism ===
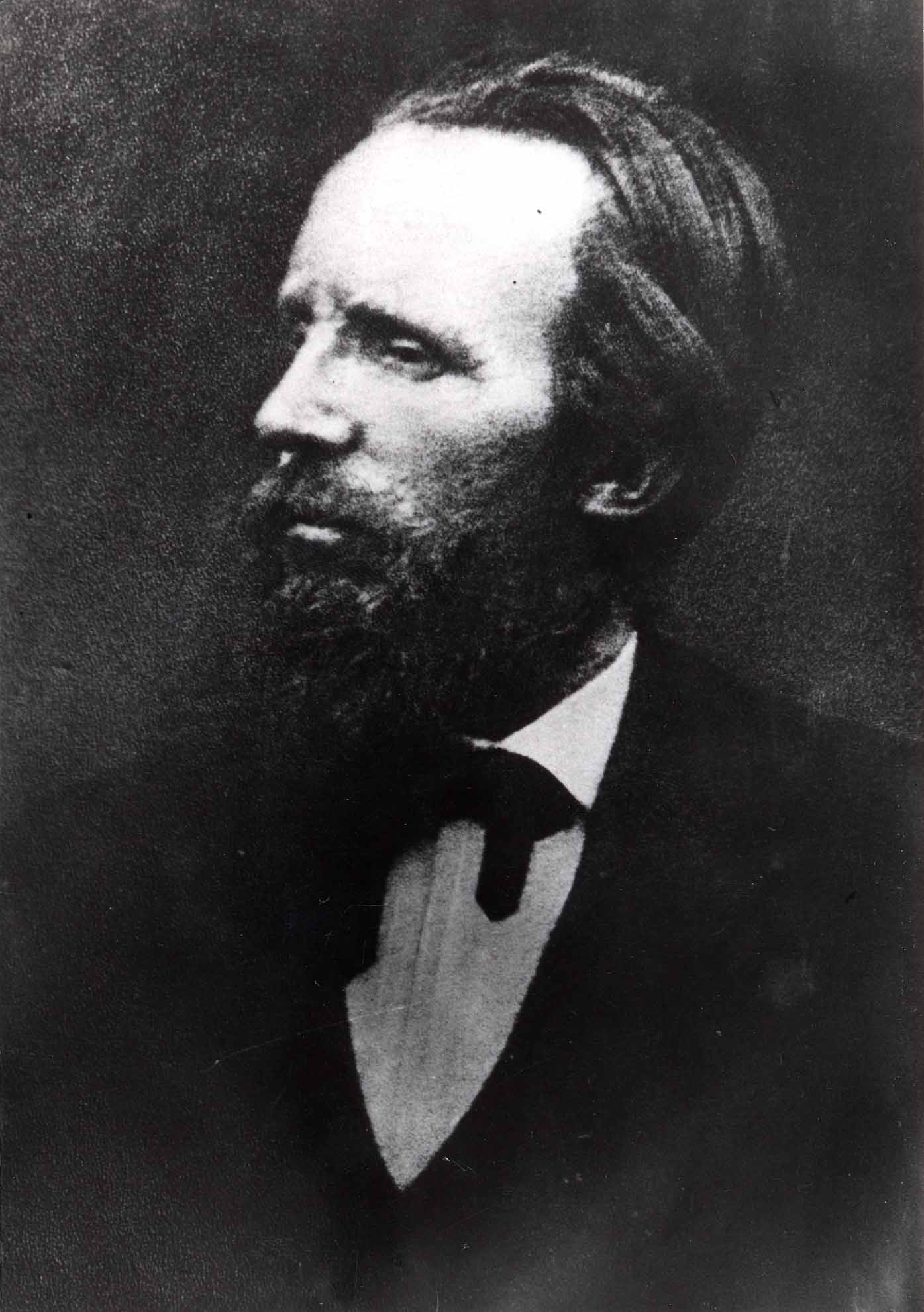
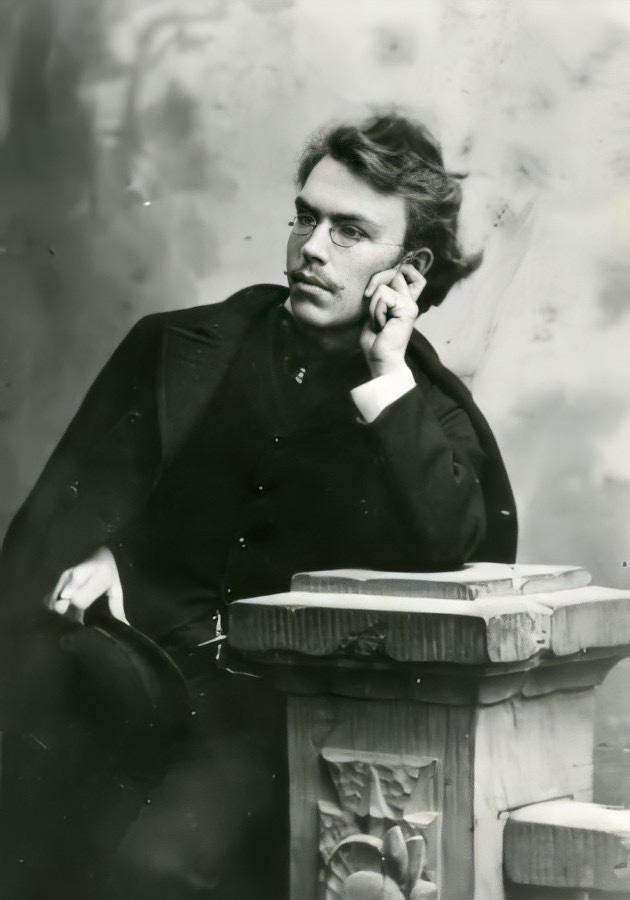
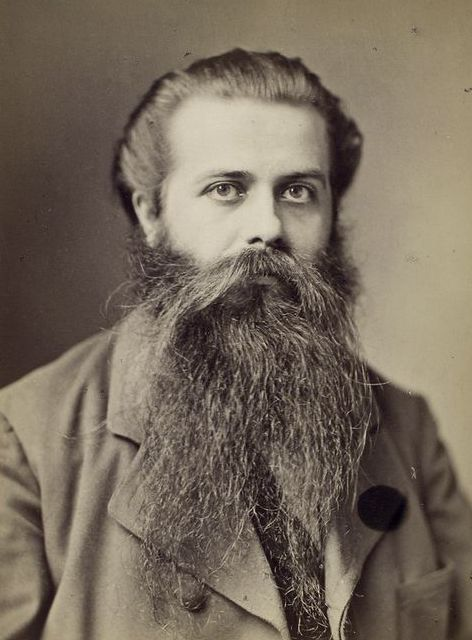
Bahnsen, Mainländer and von Hartmann are among several philosophers who developed Schopenhauer's ideas on philosophical pessimism.

During the final years of Schopenhauer's life and subsequent years after his death, post-Schopenhauerian pessimism became a popular trend in 19th-century Germany. Nevertheless, it was viewed with disdain by the other popular philosophies at the time, such as Hegelianism, materialism, neo-Kantianism and the emerging positivism. In an age of upcoming revolutions and exciting discoveries in science, the resigned and anti-progressive nature of the typical pessimist was seen as a detriment to social development. To respond to this growing criticism, a group of philosophers greatly influenced by Schopenhauer (indeed, some even being his personal acquaintances) developed their own brand of pessimism, each in their own unique way. Thinkers such as Julius Bahnsen, Eduard von Hartmann, Philipp Mainländer and others cultivated the ever-increasing threat of pessimism by converting Schopenhauer's transcendental idealism into what Frederick C. Beiser calls transcendental realism. (Note: Beiser reviews the commonly held position that Schopenhauer was a transcendental idealist and he rejects it: "Though it is deeply heretical from the standpoint of transcendental idealism, Schopenhauer's objective standpoint involves a form of transcendental realism, i.e. the assumption of the independent reality of the world of experience.") The transcendental idealist thesis is that humans know only the appearances of things (not things-in-themselves); the transcendental realist thesis is that "the knowledge we have of how things appear to us in experience gives us knowledge of things-in-themselves."

By espousing transcendental realism, Schopenhauer's own dark observations about the nature of the world would become completely knowable and objective, and in this way, they would attain certainty. The certainty of pessimism being, that non-existence is preferable to existence. That, along with the metaphysical reality of the Will, were the premises which the post-Schopenhauerian thinkers inherited from Schopenhauer's teachings. From this common starting point, each philosopher developed their own negative view of being in their respective philosophies.

Some pessimists would assuage the critics by accepting the validity of their criticisms and embracing historicism, as was the case with Schopenhauer's literary executor Julius Frauenstädt and with Von Hartmann (who gave transcendental realism a unique twist). Agnes Taubert, the wife of Von Hartmann, in her work Der pessimismus und seine gegner (Pessimism and Its Opponents) defined pessimism as a matter of measuring the eudaimonological value of life in order to determine whether existence is preferable to non-existence or not, and like her husband, Taubert argued that the answer to this problem is "empirically ascertainable". Olga Plümacher was critical of Schopenhauer's pessimism for "not achieving as good a pessimism as he might have done", and was, as a result, inferior to Von Hartmann's thought on the subject, which allowed for social progress. Julius Bahnsen would reshape the understanding of pessimism overall, while Philipp Mainländer set out to reinterpret and elucidate the nature of the Will, by presenting it as a self-mortifying will to death.

==== Pessimism controversy ====
The pessimism controversy or pessimism dispute (German: Pessimismusstreit) was an intellectual controversy that occurred in Germany, starting in the 1860s and ending around the beginning of the First World War. Philosophers who took part included Friedrich Nietzsche, Eugen Dühring, Eduard von Hartmann, neo-Kantians, Agnes Taubert, Olga Plümacher and critics of Von Hartmann.

The controversy first arose as a response to Arthur Schopenhauer's growing posthumous public recognition in the 1860s. This led to the publication of a wide array of criticisms, attacking his pessimism. The publication of Von Hartmann's Philosophy of the Unconscious, in 1869, which reaffirmed and further developed Schopenhauer's doctrine, reinvigorated the controversy. Von Hartmann published a great number of articles and four books in response to his critics, throughout the 1870s and 1880s. Agnes Taubert (Von Hartmann's wife), in response to criticisms of her husband, published Pessimism and Its Opponents in 1873, which had a strong influence on the controversy. The German-American philosopher Amalie J. Hathaway has been described as an unrecognised contributor to the controversy.

The debate also spread to Britain and the United States. Frances Power Cobbe, in her 1877 essay, critiqued Schopenhauer's misogyny but argued that the rise of pessimism reflected growing empathy—a sign of societal progress. This, she claimed, made pessimism self-defeating, as its spread indicated an improving, more compassionate world.

=== Julius Bahnsen ===
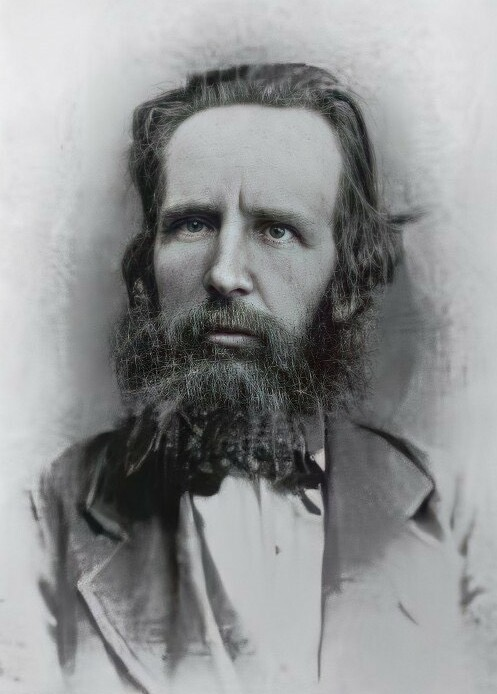
Julius Bahnsen; his radical pessimism excluded any possibility of progress and deliverance.

The pessimistic outlook of the German philosopher Julius Bahnsen is often described as the most extreme form of philosophical pessimism, perhaps even more so than Mainländer's since it excludes any possibility of redemption or salvation, with Bahnsen being skeptical that art, asceticism or even culture can remove us from this world of suffering, or that they provide escape from the self-torment of the will.

According to Bahnsen, the heart of reality lies in the inner conflict of the will, divided within itself and "willing what it does not will and not willing what it wills". Rather than just a variation of Schopenhauer's philosophy, but similar to Von Hartmann's philosophy, Bahnsen's worldview is a synthesis of Schopenhauer with Hegel. But while Von Hartmann attempts to moderate Schopenhauer's pessimism with Hegel's optimistic belief in historical progress, Bahnsen's philosophy excludes any evolution or progress in history due to seeing it as cyclical and with contradiction being a constant. When taking Hegel's dialectic as an influence (but not his historicism), Bahnsen takes only the negative moment of his dialectic, or in other words, its emphasis on contradiction. Thus, the main theme of Bahnsen's philosophy became his own idea of the Realdialektik, according to which there is no synthesis between two opposing forces, with the opposition resulting only in negation and the consequent destruction of contradicting aspects. For Bahnsen, no rationality was to be found in being and thus, there was no teleological power that led to progress at the end of every conflict.

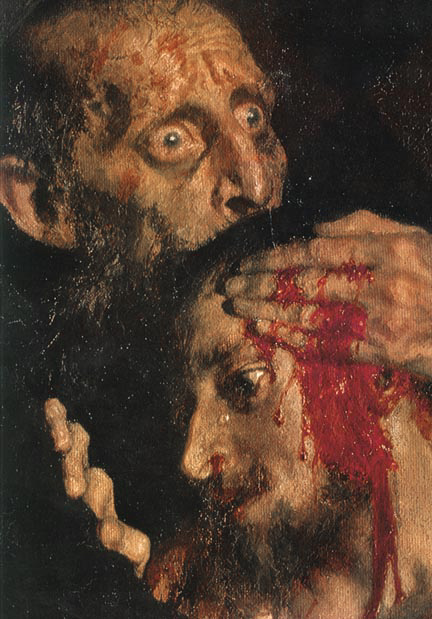
In Bahnsen's pessimistic philosophy, the notion of tragedy plays an essential role.

Bahnsen's pessimism gives a central place to his theory of tragedy – a corollary of the contradictory character of his Realdialektik. According to him, there can never be a clear or consistent answer as to what moral duties or values an individual should adopt. Whatever we do in our lives, particularly in the more intricate moral situations, will involve violating a conflicting duty, principle or other basic value (which deserve to be honoured no less); this happens not only due to a simple lack of moral absolutes, but also from competing conceptions of the good, which are incompatible and with there being weighty and worthy counter-motives for every single action in life.

In his 2016 work, Weltschmerz: Pessimism in German Philosophy, 1860–1900, the American philosopher Frederick C. Beiser expresses Bahnsen's theory of tragedy as follows:

The very heart of tragedy, for Bahnsen, consists in two fundamental facts: first, that the individual has to choose between conflicting duties or incommensurable values; and second, that he or she will be punished, or have to suffer, because he or she obeys one duty or honours one value at the expense of another. ... Because duties and values conflict, and because the tragic hero or heroine must act on some duty or value in a particular situation, he or she has no choice but to sin; they must violate another duty or disregard another basic value; and for that infraction or transgression they must be punished. The essence of a tragedy, then, is that we must do the right or act for the good, but that we will also be punished for it because we cannot help violating other duties and goods. Even with the best intentions and the most scrupulous conscience, we end up doing something bad and wrong, for which we must pay.

For Bahnsen, the only respite from such a grim view of life was through humor; in other words, in learning how to laugh at ourselves and our predicament. Though he insists that humor does not necessarily extricate us from our tragic situation, he does believe that it allows us to momentarily detach or abstract ourselves from it (in a similar way to Schopenhauer's view on aesthetic contemplation through art). It ultimately however offers no enduring remedies, no reliable methods to escape from the suffering and moral dilemmas of life; its only power is to lighten the load and to prepare us for even more to come.

=== Philipp Mainländer ===
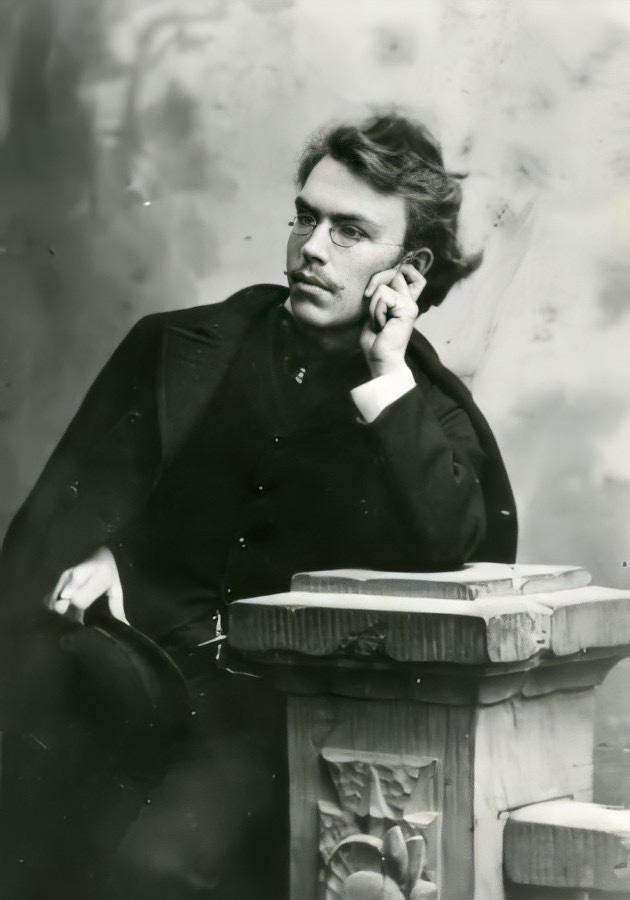
Philipp Mainländer published Die Philosophie der Erlösung in 1876 and committed suicide shortly afterwards.

Philipp Mainländer was a poet and philosopher mainly known for his magnum opus "The Philosophy of Redemption" (Die Philosophie der Erlösung), a work marked by a profound pessimism that he had published just before his suicide in 1876. For Theodor Lessing, it is "perhaps the most radical system of pessimism known to philosophical literature", although it is part of Schopenhauer's philosophical heritage. Mainländer articulates in it the concept of the "death of God", which quickly finds an echo in Nietzsche's philosophy (though with a more metaphysical meaning), and the notion of the "Will to death". The Will to death, which is an inverted form of Schopenhauer's Will to live, is the principle of all existence ever since the origin of the world. Indeed, God (Note: In Mainländer's naturalistic philosophy, "God" is a metaphor for a kind of initial singularity from which the expansion of the universe began.) gave himself death, as it were, in creating the world, and since then, annihilation constitutes the only "salvation" of being, its only possibility of "redemption". For Mainländer, life itself has no value, and "the Will, ignited by the knowledge that non-being is better than being, is the supreme principle of morality". When the individual, by observing his own Will, realizes that his salvation lies in his death, his Will to live is transformed into a Will to death. The Will to live is in this perspective only the means used by the Will to death to accomplish its goal.

In contrast to Schopenhauer, Mainländer supports a pluralistic conception of reality, called nominalism. This ontological pluralism implies that individual Wills are mortal, that the existence of an individual is limited in duration as well as in extension. The disappearance of an individual therefore leads to the silence of his Will, being reduced to nothingness. In Schopenhauer's metaphysics, on the contrary, individual Wills were only manifestations of the essence of the world itself (the Will). Therefore, the disappearance of individuals could in no way extinguish the Will. It would have been necessary to reduce the totality of the world to nothingness in order to do so. Mainländer's pluralist metaphysics, on the other hand, makes the annihilation of the Will possible, leading one to ascribe to death an essential negative power: that of making the essence of the world (understood as the simple sum of all individuals) disappear. Since non-being is superior to being, death provides a real benefit, even more important than all the others since it is definitive. This benefit is that of eternal peace and tranquility, which Mainländer calls "redemption", thus taking up the lexicon of Christianity. Indeed, he interprets Christianity, in its mystical form, as a religion of renunciation and salvation, as a first revelation of his own philosophy.

Mainländer insists on the decisive significance of his ontological pluralism, with reality being nothing other than the existence of individual Wills. Rejecting Schopenhauer's metaphysical perspective, and with it the postulate of a cosmic universal Will above and beyond the individual Will, he asserts the necessarily "immanent", empirical and representational – and therefore non-metaphysical - character of knowledge, limited as it is to the field of individual consciousness. For him, each Will, conceived as self-sufficient both from the point of view of knowledge and ontologically, is radically separated from the others. Nevertheless, Mainländer admits, the natural sciences show that all the beings that make up the world are systematically interconnected, so that each thing depends on each other thing according to necessary laws. Science thus seems to contradict the thesis that all Will is closed in on itself (and therefore free). This apparent contradiction can, however, be resolved, according to Mainländer, by introducing the dimension of time: before the beginning of time, there was a single, pure singularity, without any division. At the beginning of time, the original unity of the world became fragmented and differentiated, thus initiating a process of division that has continued ever since. From the primitive unity of the world there remains the principle of the interconnection of things according to the laws of nature, but the underlying unity of things belongs to the past and therefore does not take away the individual character of the Will.

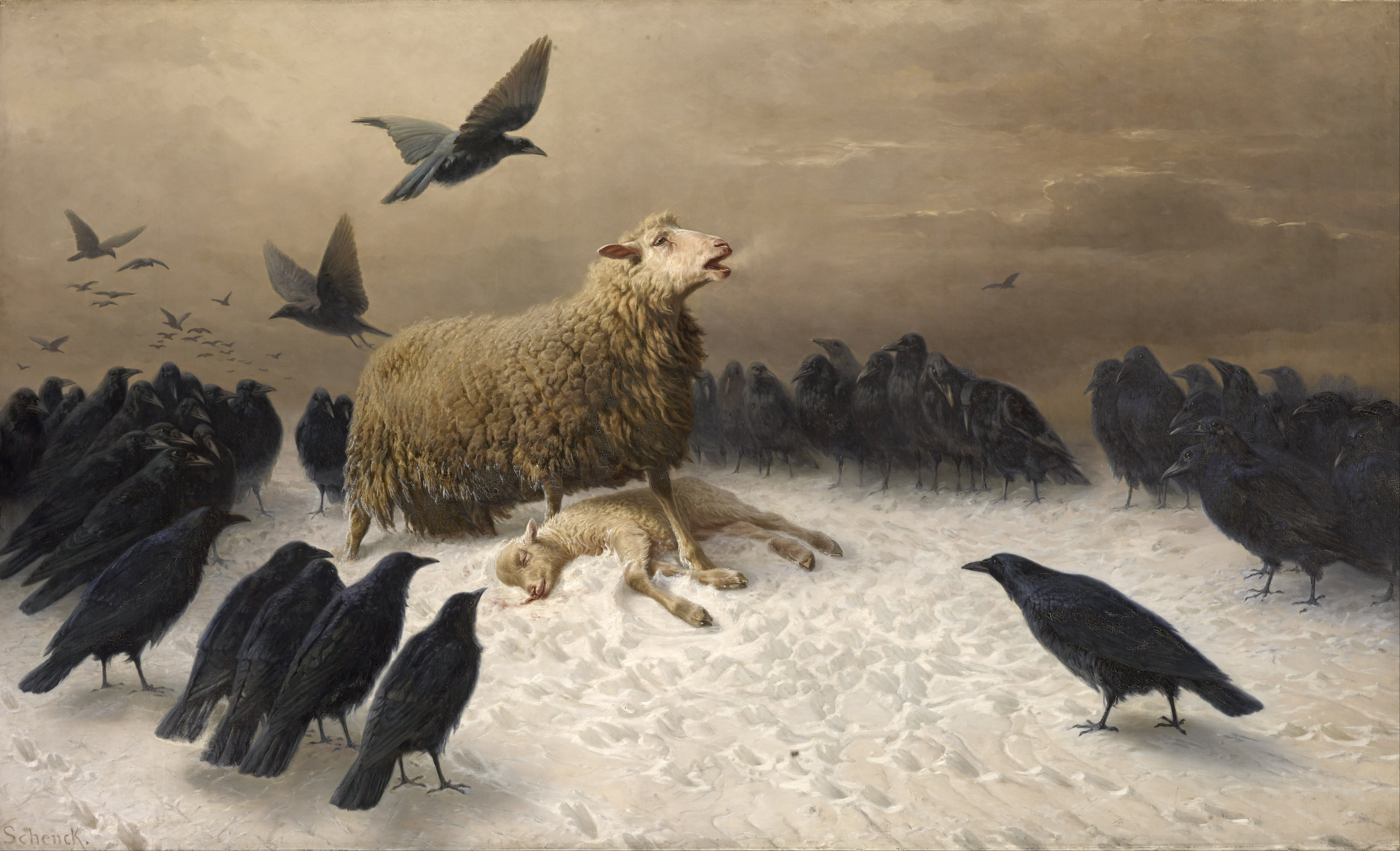
For Mainländer, "God is dead", and the world itself, doomed to disappear, is his "rotting corpse".

It is to shed light on this passage from the conversion of the original unity to multiplicity that Mainländer introduces his tragic concept of the death of God. In a vain prophecy, he declares: "God has died and His death was the life of the world". As Christianity had sensed through the figure of Christ, God – that is, the initial singularity – sacrificed himself by giving birth to the world. Although we cannot really know the modalities of this begetting, it is possible, according to Mainländer, to have some idea of it by analogy with us. In this perspective, he constructs a remarkable anthropomorphic creation mythology in which God appears as a perfectly free and omnipotent individual, but who discovers with horror his own limitation in the very fact of his existence, which he cannot directly abolish, being the primary condition of all his powers. In this narrative, God, now inhabited by anguish, becomes aware that his present existence has a negative value, that it is therefore of less value than his non-existence. He then decides to put an end to it; not directly, which is impossible for him, but by the mediation of a creation. By creating the world and then fragmenting it into a multitude of individual entities, he can progressively realize his desire for self-destruction. It is this divine impulse towards self-destruction and annihilation that ultimately animates the whole cosmos, even if the impulse towards life (the Will to live) seems to dominate it at first sight. For example, the Will to live that exists in the plants and animals of the organic realm coexists, in an indirect or unconscious manner, with the Will to death: in other words, the Will to death is "masked" or concealed by the Will to live; however, the Will to death gradually and inevitably triumphs over the Will to live, as every living being, sooner or later, dies and ceases to be – as derived from God's original yearning towards non-being. Everything that exists, from the inorganic realm to the organic realm is ultimately governed by a fatal process of cosmic annihilation that translates on the physical level into entropy, and on the level of the living into struggle and conflict. Mainländer considers this whole process to be ineluctable, like a Greek tragedy in which the destiny that one seeks to escape always ends up being fulfilled. In this macabre tragedy, the whole world is nothing more than "the rotting corpse of God". (Note: Thacker writes: "God doesn't die accidentally, but kills himself. In this 'self-cadaverization of God,' Mainländer suggests that the world, life, our very selves, are all the rotting residue of God's suicide.")

=== Eduard von Hartmann ===
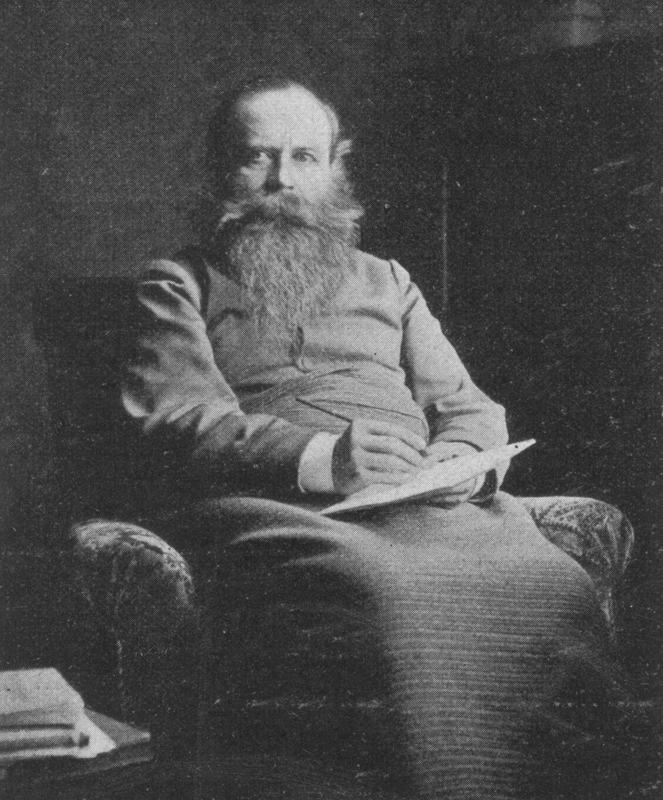
According to Eduard von Hartmann, it is only through the constant attempt to gain happiness that humans can learn the desirability of nothingness; and when this knowledge has become universal, or at least general, deliverance will come and the world will cease.

In his work entitled Philosophy of the Unconscious, the first edition of which appeared in 1869 and became famous already in the first years of its publication, Eduard von Hartmann, while presenting himself as the heir of Arthur Schopenhauer, replaces the Schopenhauerian principle of Will with his own principle of the Unconscious. The Unconscious, being a metaphysical rather than a psychological concept, is the invisible actor of history and hidden instigator of evolution, including indissociably the irrational Will which pushes the world to exist (in Schopenhauer's sense), and the "Idea", in the Hegelian sense, which is the rational and organizing element of the world.

The Unconscious is both Will, Reason (the latter concept also interpreted as Idea) and the absolute all-embracing ground of all existence. Thus, being influenced by both Hegel and Schopenhauer, he affirms that the evolution of history goes in the direction of the development of the Idea and its prevalence over the (unconscious) Will. But it is indeed the Will, considered as an irrational principle, that has produced the world. The world is therefore inevitably full of evils and pains that cannot be eradicated, and the progressive development of the Idea means the progressive awareness of these evils and their inevitability, not their replacement by consciousness. A "cosmic-universal negation of the Will" shall therefore appear as the only final solution for the human race that has reached full consciousness, with the Unconscious evoking Reason and with its aid creating the best of all possible worlds, which contains the promise of its redemption from actual existence by the emancipation of Reason from its subjugation to the Will in the conscious reason of the enlightened pessimist.

Although Von Hartmann is a pessimist, his pessimism is by no means unmitigated. The individual's happiness is indeed unattainable either here and now or hereafter and in the future, but he does not despair of ultimately releasing the Unconscious from its sufferings. He differs from Schopenhauer in making salvation by the "negation of the will to life" depend on a collective social effort and not on individualistic asceticism. Von Hartmann explains that there are three fundamental illusions about the value of life that must be overcome before humanity can achieve what he calls absolute painlessness, nothingness, or Nirvana. The first of these illusions is the hope of good in the present, the confidence in the pleasures of this world, such as was felt by the Greeks. This is followed by the Christian transference of happiness to another and better life, to which in turn succeeds the illusion that looks for happiness in progress, and dreams of a future made worthwhile by the achievements of science. All alike are empty promises, and known as such in the final stage, which sees all human desires as equally vain and the only good in the peace of Nirvana. When the greater part of the Will in existence is so far enlightened by reason as to perceive the inevitable misery of existence, a collective effort to will non-existence will be made, and the world will relapse into nothingness, the Unconscious into quiescence.

The conception of a redemption of the Unconscious also supplies the ultimate basis of Von Hartmann's ethics. We must provisionally affirm life and devote ourselves to social evolution, instead of striving after a happiness which is impossible; in so doing we shall find that morality renders life less unhappy than it would otherwise be. Suicide, and all other forms of selfishness, are highly reprehensible. Epistemologically, Von Hartmann is a transcendental realist, who ably defends his views and acutely criticizes those of his opponents. His realism enables him to maintain the reality of Time, and so of the process of the world's redemption.

=== Friedrich Nietzsche ===
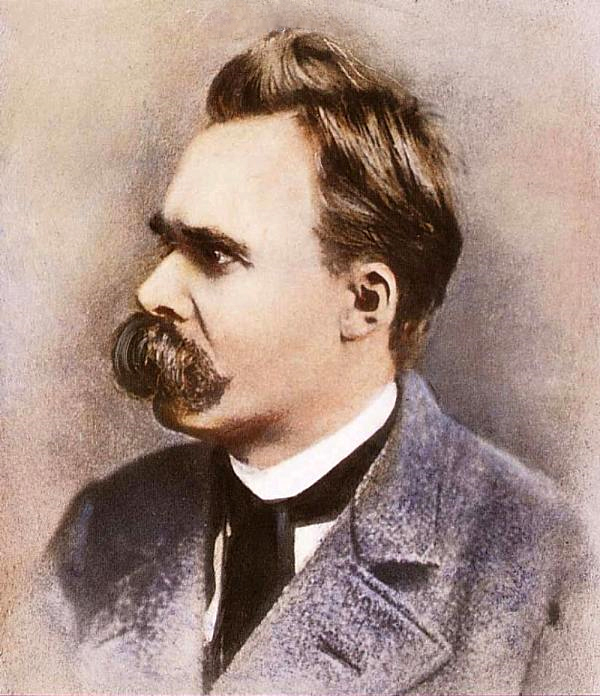
Strongly criticizing the pessimism of his German contemporaries, "a pessimism of the weak", Nietzsche introduced his own version of pessimism: "Dionysian pessimism", or "a pessimism of the strong".

Friedrich Nietzsche could be said to be a philosophical pessimist even though unlike Schopenhauer (whom he read avidly) his response to the tragic pessimistic view is neither resigned nor self-denying, but a life-affirming form of pessimism. For Nietzsche this was a "pessimism of the future", a "Dionysian pessimism". Nietzsche identified his Dionysian pessimism with what he saw as the pessimism of the Greek pre-socratics and also saw it at the core of ancient Greek tragedy. He saw tragedy as laying bare the terrible nature of human existence, bound by constant flux. In contrast to this, Nietzsche saw Socratic philosophy as an optimistic refuge of those who could not bear the tragedy any longer. Since Socrates posited that wisdom could lead to happiness, Nietzsche saw this as "morally speaking, a sort of cowardice ... amorally, a ruse". Nietzsche was also critical of Schopenhauer's pessimism because, he argued that, in judging the world negatively, it turned to moral judgments about the world and, therefore, led to weakness and nihilism. Nietzsche's response was a total embracing of the nature of the world, a "great liberation" through a "pessimism of strength" which "does not sit in judgment of this condition". He believed that the task of the philosopher was to wield this pessimism like a hammer, to first attack the basis of old moralities and beliefs and then to "make oneself a new pair of wings", i.e. to re-evaluate all values and create new ones. A key feature of this Dionysian pessimism was "saying yes" to the changing nature of the world, which entailed embracing destruction and suffering joyfully, forever (hence the ideas of amor fati and eternal recurrence). Pessimism for Nietzsche was an art of living that is "good for one's health" as a "remedy and an aid in the service of growing and struggling life".

== Victorian pessimism ==
The pessimism of many of the thinkers of the Victorian era has been attributed to a reaction against the "benignly progressive" views of the Age of Enlightenment, which were often expressed by the members of the Romantic movement. The works of Schopenhauer, particularly his concept of the primacy of the Will, has also been cited as a major influence on Victorian pessimism, as well as Darwin's 1859 publication of On the Origin of Species.

Several British writers of the time have been noted for the pervasive pessimism of their works, including Matthew Arnold, Edward FitzGerald, James Thomson, Algernon Charles Swinburne, Ernest Dowson, A. E. Housman, Thomas Hardy, Christina Rossetti, and Amy Levy. Their pessimistic themes often focus on love, fatalism, and religious doubt. The poems of the Canadian poet Frederick George Scott have also been cited as an example of Victorian pessimism, as have the poems of the American poet Edwin Arlington Robinson.

During this period, artistic representations of nature transformed, from benevolent, uplifting and god-like, to actively hostile, competitive, or indifferent. Alfred, Lord Tennyson exemplified this change with the line "Nature, red in tooth and claw", in his 1850 poem In Memoriam.

== 20th century ==
=== Albert Camus ===
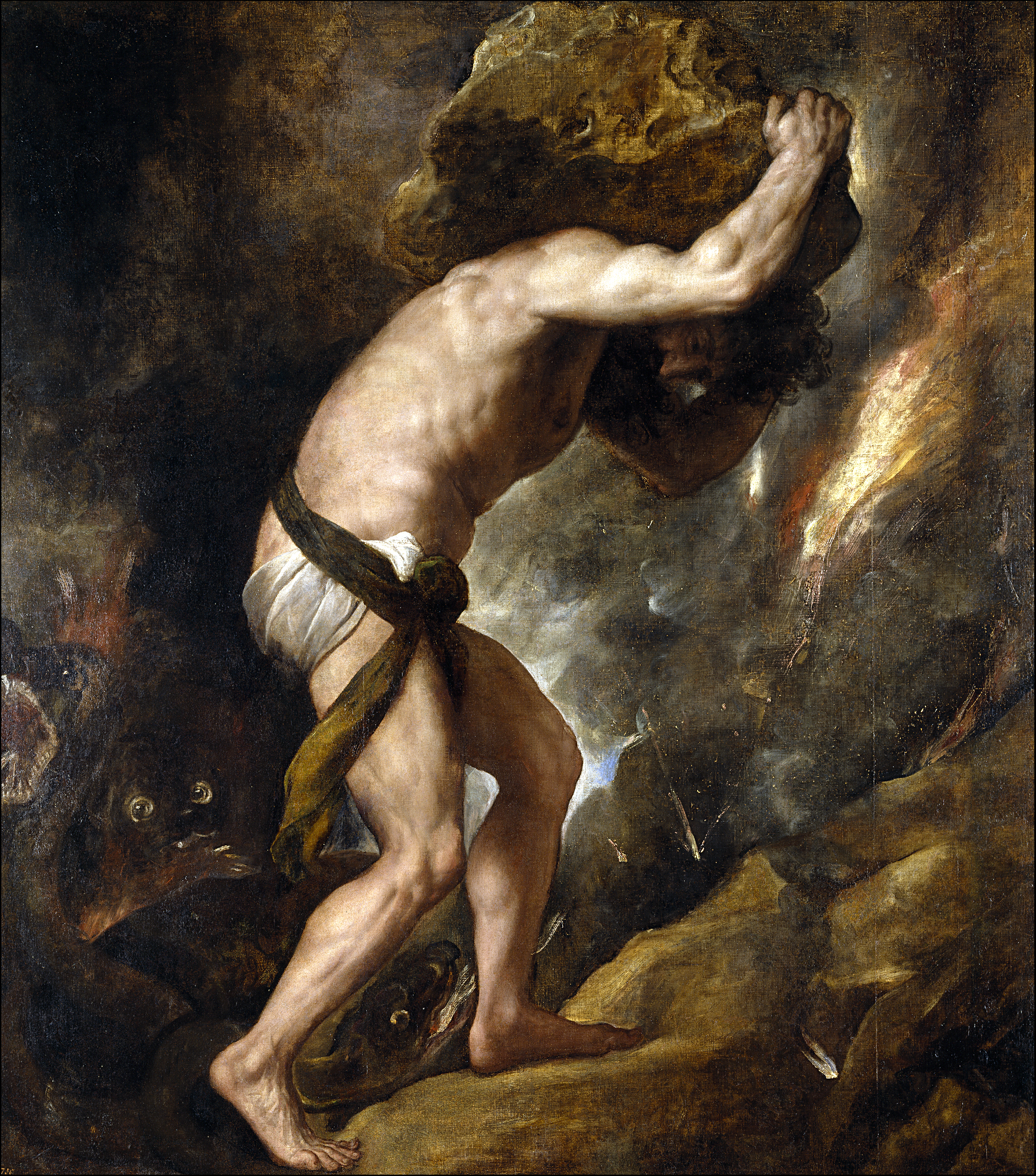
Camus used the punishment of Sisyphus as a metaphor for the human condition.

In a 1945 article, Albert Camus wrote: "The idea that a pessimistic philosophy is necessarily one of discouragement is a puerile idea." As scholar David Simpson notes, Camus was influenced by the ideas of both Schopenhauer and Nietzsche, which led him to develop his own philosophy of "defiant" pessimism and atheism.

Camus helped popularize the idea of "the absurd", a key term in his famous essay The Myth of Sisyphus. Like previous philosophical pessimists, Camus saw human consciousness and reason as that which "sets me in opposition to all creation". For Camus, this clash between a reasoning mind which craves meaning and a "silent" world is what produces the most important philosophical problem, the "problem of suicide". Camus believed that people often escape facing the absurd through "eluding" (l'esquive), a "trickery" for "those who live not for life itself but some great idea that will transcend it, refine it, give it a meaning, and betray it".

Jean-Paul Sartre, however, rejected the "classical pessimism" and disillusionment he perceived in Camus's philosophy, arguing that humans can confidently create meaning through radical freedom in an absurd world. In contrast, Camus views absurdity as an unsurpassable tension between human consciousness and an irrational world, advocating for rebellion as a life-affirming response rather than seeking to transcend the absurd.

Camus considered suicide and religion as inauthentic forms of eluding or escaping the problem of existence. For Camus, the only choice was to defiantly accept and live with the absurd, for "there is no fate that cannot be surmounted by scorn." He illustrated his response to the condition of the absurd by using the Greek mythic character of Sisyphus, who was condemned by the gods to push a boulder up a hill for eternity, only for it to roll down again when it reached the top. Camus imagined Sisyphus while pushing the rock, realizing the futility of his task, but doing it anyway out of rebellion: "One must imagine Sisyphus happy."

=== Peter Wessel Zapffe ===
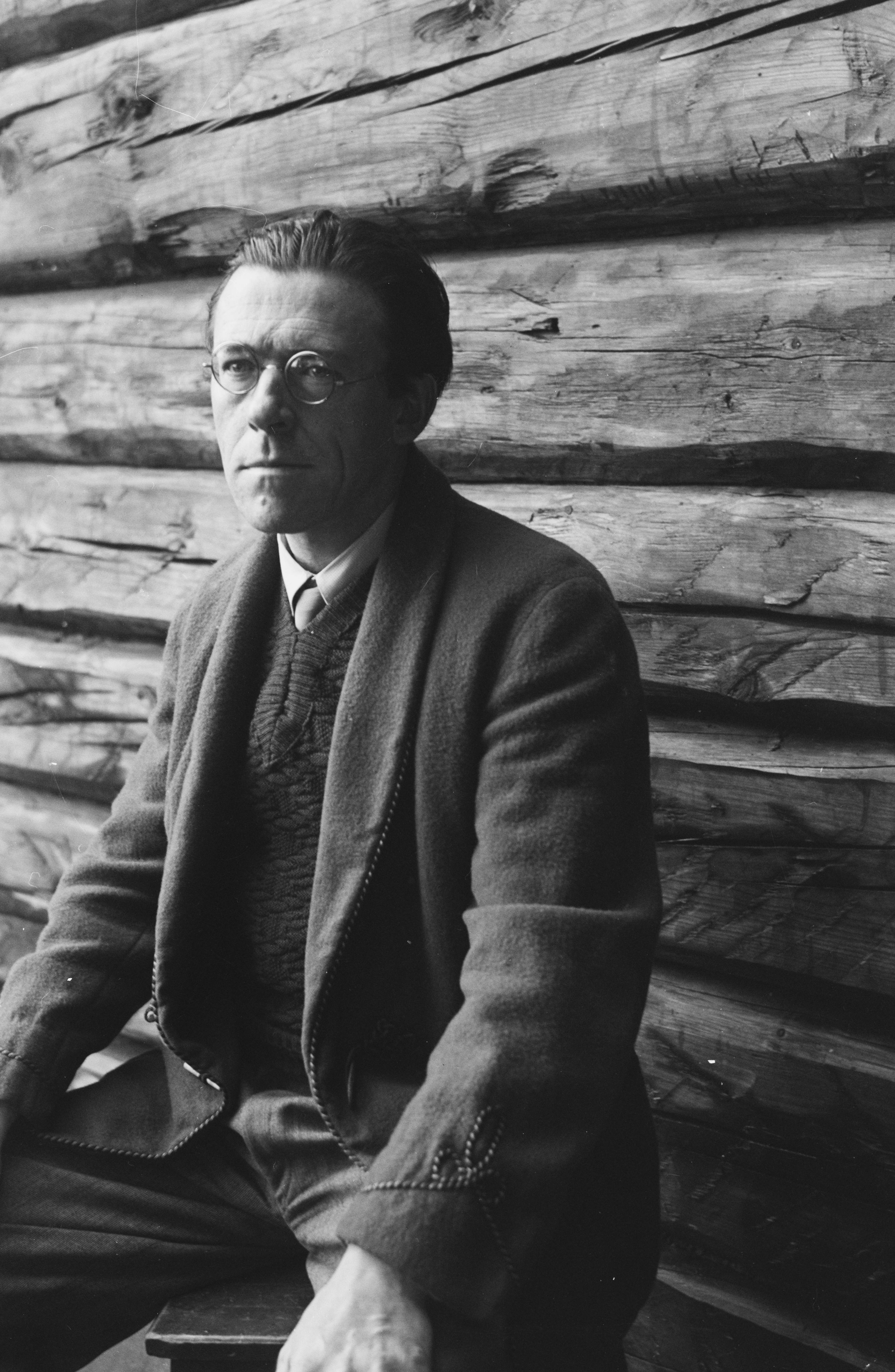
Zapffe regarded humans as a kind of biological paradox.

Peter Wessel Zapffe argued that evolution bestowed humans with a surplus of consciousness which allowed them to contemplate their place in the cosmos and yearn for justice and meaning together with freedom from suffering and death, while simultaneously being aware that nature or reality itself cannot satisfy those deep longings and spiritual demands. For Zapffe, this was a tragic byproduct of evolution: humans' full apprehension of their ill-fated and vulnerable situation in the universe would, according to him, cause them to fall into a state of "cosmic panic" or existential terror. Humans' knowledge of their predicament is thus repressed through the use of four mechanisms, conscious or not, which he names isolation, anchoring, distraction and sublimation.

In his essay "The Last Messiah", he describes these four defense mechanisms as follows:

- Isolation is "a fully arbitrary dismissal from consciousness of all disturbing and destructive thought and feeling".
- Anchoring is the "fixation of points within, or construction of walls around, the liquid fray of consciousness". The anchoring mechanism provides individuals with a value or an ideal to consistently focus their attention on. Zapffe also applied the anchoring principle to society and stated that "God, the Church, the State, morality, fate, the laws of life, the people, the future" are all examples of collective primary anchoring firmaments.
- Distraction is when "one limits attention to the critical bounds by constantly enthralling it with impressions". Distraction focuses all of one's energy on a task or idea to prevent the mind from turning in on itself.
- Sublimation is the refocusing of energy away from negative outlets, toward positive ones. The individuals distance themselves and look at their existence from an aesthetic point of view (e.g., writers, poets, painters). Zapffe himself pointed out that his produced works were the product of sublimation.

Terror Management Theory (TMT), a social and evolutionary psychology theory, is in accordance with Zapffe's view of human beings' higher cognitive abilities bringing them a form of existential anxiety that needs to be repressed or dealt with in some way. According to TMT, such existential angst is born from the juxtaposition of human beings' awareness of themselves as merely transient animals groping to survive in a meaningless universe, destined only to die and decay. For TMT, repression of such awareness is done through symbolic conceptions of reality that give meaning, order, and permanence to existence; provide a set of standards for what is valuable; and promise some form of either literal or symbolic immortality to those who believe in the cultural worldview and live up to its standards of value.

=== Emil Cioran ===
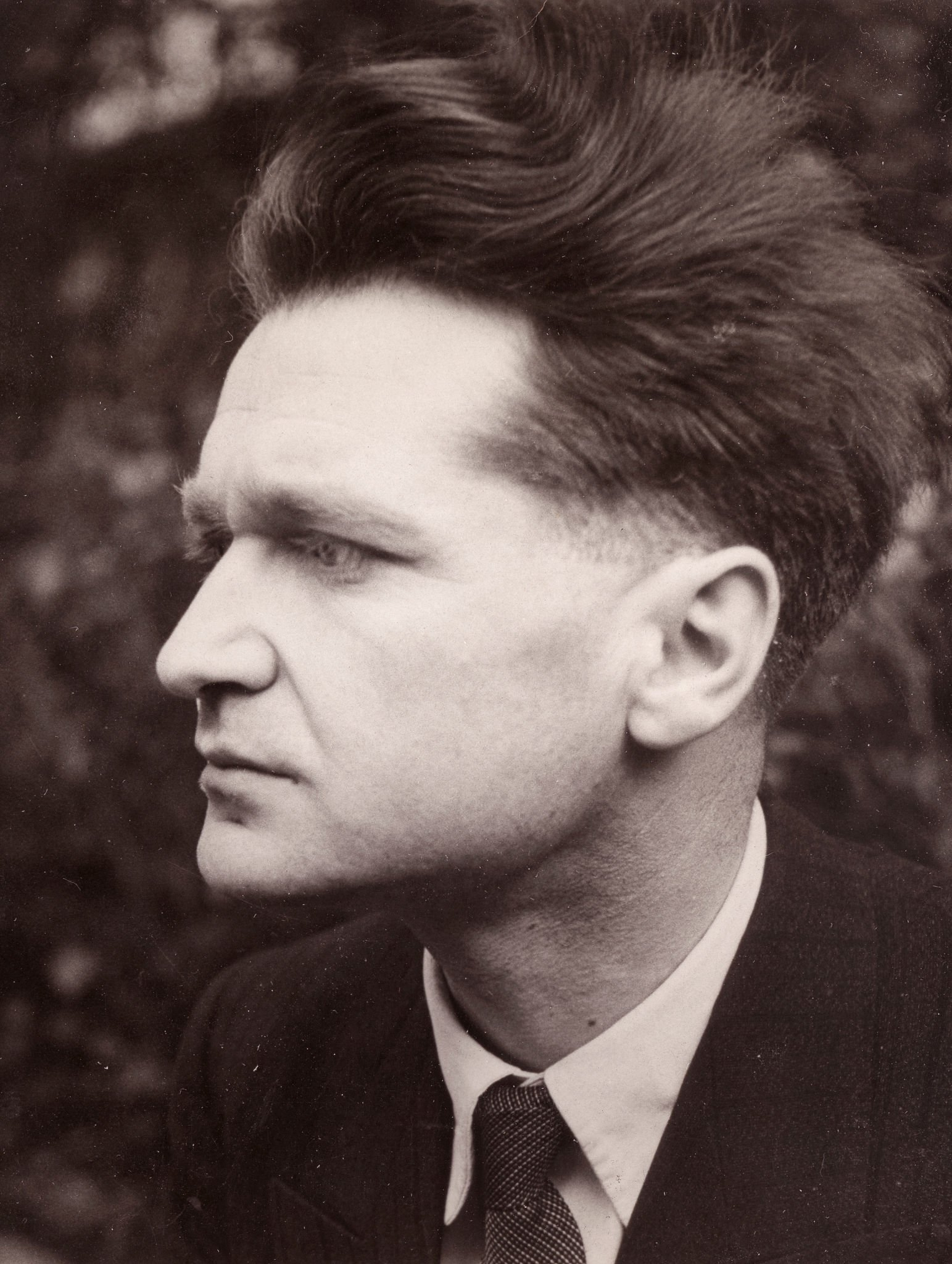
Cioran described existence as an exile to which we were condemned at our births, with nothingness remaining our true home.

Emil Cioran's works are permeated with philosophical pessimism, and deal with topics including failure, suffering, decay, existentialism and nihilism. Lacking interest in traditional philosophical systems and jargon, he rejects very early abstract speculation in favor of personal reflection and passionate lyricism. His first book, On the Heights of Despair, created as a product of Cioran's chronic insomnia, deals with "despair and decay, absurdity and alienation, futility and the irrationality of existence". Cioran considered the human condition, the universe and life itself to be a failure: "life is a failure of taste which neither death nor even poetry succeeds in correcting." William H. Gass described Cioran's The Temptation to Exist as "a philosophical romance on the modern themes of alienation, absurdity, boredom, futility, decay, the tyranny of history, the vulgarities of change, awareness as agony, reason as disease".

Cioran's view of life's futility and the totality of its failure perhaps existed from a young age. In 1935, his mother told him that if she knew he would be so miserable, she would have aborted him. This prompted Cioran to later reflect, "I'm simply an accident. Why take it all so seriously?"

Cioran wrote several works entirely in aphorisms; in reference to this choice, Cioran stated:

I only write this kind of stuff, because explaining bores me terribly. That's why I say when I've written aphorisms it's that I've sunk back into fatigue, why bother. And so, the aphorism is scorned by "serious" people, the professors look down upon it. When they read a book of aphorisms, they say, "Oh, look what this fellow said ten pages back, now he's saying the contrary. He's not serious." Me, I can put two aphorisms that are contradictory right next to each other. Aphorisms are also momentary truths. They're not decrees. And I could tell you in nearly every case why I wrote this or that phrase, and when. It's always set in motion by an encounter, an incident, a fit of temper, but they all have a cause. It's not at all gratuitous.

In The Trouble with Being Born, Cioran, through aphorisms, examined the problem of being brought into existence into a world which is difficult to fully accept, or reject, without one's consent. His aphorisms in The Trouble with Being Born pack philosophy into single sentences. For example, Cioran summarizes the futility of life and espoused antinatalism by saying: "We have lost, being born, as much as we shall lose dying. Everything."

Cioran rejected suicide, as he saw suicide and death to be equally meaningless as life in a meaningless world. In The Trouble with Being Born, he contrasts suicide with his antinatalism: "It's not worth the bother of killing yourself, since you always kill yourself too late." He did, however, argue that contemplating suicide could lead humans to live better lives.

== 21st century ==
=== Julio Cabrera ===
According to Julio Cabrera's ontology, human life has a structurally negative value. Under this view, human life does not provoke discomfort in humans due to the particular events that happen in the lives of each individual, but due to the very being or nature of human existence as such. The following characteristics constitute what Cabrera calls the "terminality of being", in other words, its structurally negative value:

1. The being acquired by a human at birth is decreasing (or "decaying"), in the sense of a being that begins to end since its very emergence, following a single and irreversible direction of deterioration and decline, of which complete consummation can occur at any moment between some minutes and around one hundred years.
2. From the moment they come into being, humans are affected by three kinds of frictions: physical pain (in the form of illnesses, accidents, and natural catastrophes to which they are always exposed); discouragement (in the form of "lacking the will", or the "mood" or the "spirit", to continue to act, from mild taedium vitae to serious forms of depression), and finally, exposure to the aggressions of other humans (from gossip and slander to various forms of discrimination, persecution, and injustice); aggressions that we too can inflict on others (who are also submitted, like us, to the three kinds of friction).
3. To defend themselves against (a) and (b), human beings are equipped with mechanisms of creation of positive values (ethical, aesthetic, religious, entertaining, recreational, as well as values contained in human realizations of all kinds), which humans must keep constantly active. All positive values that appear within human life are reactive and palliative; they do not arise from the structure of life itself, but are introduced by the permanent and anxious struggle against the decaying life and its three kinds of friction, with such struggle however doomed to be defeated, at any moment, by any of the mentioned frictions or by the progressive decline of one's being.

For Cabrera, this situation is further worsened by a phenomenon he calls "moral impediment", that is, the structural impossibility of acting in the world without harming or manipulating someone at some given moment. According to him, moral impediment happens not necessarily because of a moral fault in us, but due to the structural situation in which we have been placed. The positive values that are created in human life come into being within a narrow and anxious environment where human beings are cornered by the presence of their decaying bodies as well as pain and discouragement, in a complicated and holistic web of actions in which we are forced to quickly understand diversified social situations and take relevant decisions, such that it is difficult for our urgent need to build our own positive values not to end up harming the projects of other humans who are also anxiously trying to do the same, that is, build their own positive values.

=== David Benatar ===
David Benatar makes a case for antinatalism and philosophical pessimism in his works, arguing that procreation is morally indefensible in his book Better Never to Have Been and in The Human Predicament asserting that a pessimistic view of existence is more realistic and suitable than an optimistic one; he also takes care to distinguish pessimism from nihilism, arguing that the two concepts are not synonymous.

To support his case for pessimism, Benatar mentions a series of empirical differences between the pleasures and pains in life. In a strictly temporal aspect, the most intense pleasures that can be experienced are short-lived (e.g. orgasms), whereas the most severe pains can be much more enduring (lasting for days, months, and even years); the worst pains that can be experienced are also worse in quality or magnitude than the best pleasures are good, offering as an example the thought experiment of whether one would accept "an hour of the most delightful pleasures in exchange for an hour of the worst tortures", in addition to citing Schopenhauer, who made a similar argument, when asking his readers to "compare the feelings of the animal that devours another with those of the one being devoured"; the amount of time it may take for one's desires to be fulfilled (with some of our desires never being satisfied); the quickness with which one's body can be injured, damaged, or fall ill, and the comparative slowness of recovery (with full recovery sometimes never being attained); the existence of chronic pain, but the comparative non-existence of chronic pleasure; the gradual and inevitable physical and mental decline to which every life is subjected through the process of ageing; the effortless way in which the bad things in life naturally come to us, and the efforts one needs to muster in order to ward them off and obtain the good things; the lack of a cosmic or transcendent meaning to human life as a whole (borrowing a term from Spinoza, according to Benatar our lives lack meaning from the perspective of the universe, that is, sub specie aeternitatis); and, finally, Benatar concludes that, even if one argues that the bad things in life are in some sense necessary for human beings to appreciate the good things in life, or at least to appreciate them fully, he asserts that it is not clear that this appreciation requires as much bad as there is, and that our lives are worse than they would be if the bad things were not in such sense necessary.

Human life would be vastly better if pain were fleeting and pleasure protracted; if the pleasures were much better than the pains were bad; if it were really difficult to be injured or get sick; if recovery were swift when injury or illness did befall us; and if our desires were fulfilled instantly and if they did not give way to new desires. Human life would also be immensely better if we lived for many thousands of years in good health and if we were much wiser, cleverer, and morally better than we are.

Benatar's suggested strategy for dealing with the above-mentioned facts is through what he calls "pragmatic pessimism", which involves engaging in activities that create terrestrial meaning (for oneself, other humans, and other animals). He asserts that such pragmatic pessimisim allows for distractions from reality, but not denials of it; in contrast to "pragmatic optimism". In extremis, he admits that suicide may be the preferable option, but until such a threshold is reached, he advocates for a response within the domain of pragmatic pessimism.

== See also ==
- Antifrustrationism
- Antinatalism
- Cynicism
- Depressive realism
- Dystheism
- Dystopia
- Misanthropy
- Misotheism
- Negative utilitarianism
- Optimism bias
- Philosophical pessimism
- Philosophy of suicide
- Radical evil
- Right to die
- Suffering-focused ethics
- Theodicy
- Wild animal suffering
- List of philosophical pessimists
