= List of philosophical pessimists =

Sortable list of philosophers of pessimism

The following is a list of philosophers who have notably expressed philosophically pessimistic views in their works and contributed to its history.

== List ==
Image	Name	Date of birth	Date of death	Nationality
	Julius Bahnsen	30 March 1830	7 December 1881	German
	Ernest Becker	27 September 1924	6 March 1974	American
—N/a	David Benatar	8 December 1966	—	South African
	Ray Brassier	22 December 1965	—	British
	The Buddha	c. 563 BC	c. 483 BC	Indian
	Julio Cabrera	1944	—	Argentinian
	Albert Camus	7 November 1913	4 January 1960	French
	Albert Caraco	8 July 1919	7 September 1971	French-Uruguayan
	Emil Cioran	8 April 1911	20 June 1995	Romanian
—N/a	David E. Cooper	1 October 1942	—	British
—N/a	Hegesias	c. 290 BC	c. 290 BC	Greek
	Drew Dalton	?	—	American
	Baltasar Gracián	8 January 1601	6 December 1658	Spanish
	John Gray	17 April 1948	—	English
	Eduard von Hartmann	23 February 1842	5 June 1906	German
—N/a	Ulrich Horstmann	31 May 1949	—	German
	Omar Khayyam	18 May 1048	4 December 1131	Persian
	Giacomo Leopardi	29 June 1798	14 June 1837	Italian
—N/a	Thomas Ligotti	9 July 1953	—	American
	al-Ma'arri	December 973	May 1057	Arab
	Philipp Mainländer	5 October 1841	1 April 1876	German
	Carlo Michelstaedter	3 June 1887	17 October 1910	Italian
	Friedrich Nietzsche	15 October 1844	25 August 1900	German
	Olga Plümacher	27 May 1839	c. 15 June 1895	German
	Blaise Pascal	19 June 1623	19 August 1662	French
	Arthur Schopenhauer	22 February 1788	21 September 1860	German
—N/a	Agnes Taubert	7 January 1844	8 May 1877	German
—N/a	Eugene Thacker	?	—	American
—N/a	Herman Tønnessen	24 July 1918	2001	Norwegian-Canadian
	Miguel de Unamuno	29 September 1864	31 December 1936	Spanish
	Peter Wessel Zapffe	18 December 1899	12 October 1990	Norwegian
