= Plümacher =

Family name

Plümacher or Plumacher is a German surname originating from the ancient word for a plumber or tinsmith. Some notable persons with the surname include:

- Christof Plümacher (born 1963), German fine art photographer
- Eugene Plumacher (1838–1910), German-American diplomat
- Hetty Plümacher (1919–2005), German operatic singer
- Luis Plumacher (born 1983), Venezuelan karateka
- Olga Plümacher (1839–1895), Russian-born Swiss-American philosopher and scholar
