= Amalie J. Hathaway =

German-American philosopher and lecturer (1839–1881)

- Born: Amalie Louise John; 1839; Mühlhausen, Saxony, Kingdom of Prussia
- Died: December 26, 1881 (aged 41–42); Prairie Ronde Township, Michigan, U.S.

Philosophical work
- Era: 19th-century philosophy
- Region: Western philosophy
- School: Post-Schopenhauerian pessimism
- Main interests: Metaphysics, philosophical pessimism
- Notable ideas: Contribution to the pessimism controversy

Amalie Louise John Hathaway (born Amalie Louise John; 1839 – December 26, 1881) was a German-American philosopher and lecturer. She wrote on Arthur Schopenhauer and has been identified by Carol M. Bensick as a contributor to the German pessimism controversy.

== Biography ==
=== Early life and education ===
Amalie Louise John was born in 1839 in Mühlhausen, Saxony, then part of the Kingdom of Prussia. When she was 12, her father, Karl John, moved the family to Wisconsin, and they later settled in Mendota, Illinois. From the age of 15, she ran a country school as a source of income.

Shortly after the University of Michigan first admitted women in 1870, Hathaway enrolled as a non-degree student in mathematics, languages, and philosophy. She studied there from 1870 to 1871 and from 1872 to 1875. Hathaway was introduced to philosophy by Benjamin Cocker, who directed her to the writings of German metaphysicians and philosophers, including Kant, Hegel, Schopenhauer, and von Hartmann, which she could read in German.

While studying, she met Benjamin Hathaway, a self-taught poet, horticulturalist, and nurseryman, who later became her husband. The couple attended the Philosophical Society of Chicago, where Hathaway's participation led to an invitation to deliver a lecture.

=== Philosophical work ===
Hathaway's only known publication, "Schopenhauer", was an 18-page paper published in Education. It was based on a lecture she delivered before the Concord School of Philosophy, which was reported on by The New York Times. The lecture also received coverage in other newspapers. The Republican described Hathaway as "probably by far the best grounded in philosophy among American women". Her unpublished papers included "Immanuel Kant", "The Hegelian Philosophy", "Hartmann", "Pessimism and the Hegelian Philosophy", and "Mental Automatism".

=== Death ===
Hathaway died suddenly at her home in Prairie Ronde Township, Michigan, on December 26, 1881.

== Reception ==
Bensick has described Hathaway as a woman philosopher who had received little attention in work recovering the history of women philosophers. She has also described Hathaway as an unrecognised contributor to the German pessimism controversy and compared her work with that of Agnes Taubert and Olga Plümacher, contemporary women philosophers who also contributed to the controversy.

Bensick's article on Hathaway was included in The Oxford Handbook of American and British Women Philosophers in the Nineteenth Century.

== Publications ==
- "Schopenhauer". Education. 2: 234–252. September 1881 – July 1882.
