= Eduction =

Eduction or variants may refer to:

- Eduction (geology), a process in which the Earth's crust spreads sideways, exposing deep-seated rocks
- Eductor-jet pump, a form of injector pump
- A conclusion educed (induced or deduced) through a process of reasoning
- A substance educed (separated or extracted) from a chemical compound

== See also ==
- Education (disambiguation)
- Deductive reasoning, reasoning from premises to reach a logical conclusion
- Inductive reasoning, reasoning supplying some evidence, but not full assurance, of the truth of the conclusion
- Reactant, a substance or compound added to a system to cause a chemical reaction
- Product (chemistry), species formed from chemical reactions
