= Education (disambiguation) =

Education is the means through which the aims and habits of a group of people are sustained from one generation to the next.

Education may also refer to:

- Education (Chittenden Memorial Window), a stained-glass window
- Education (journal), an academic journal
- Education (constituency), functional constituency of Hong Kong
- Educational management, the system of managing educational institutions
- Education, short-form for the cabinet portfolio of a Minister of Education
- Education, short-form for a polity's Ministry of Education
- Education (play), an 1813 comedy play by Thomas Morton
- An Education, a 2009 British film starring Carey Mulligan and Peter Sarsgaard
- Education (film), a 2020 drama film directed by Steve McQueen
- "Education", a song by Lights from the 2025 album A6Extended
- School of education, a division within a university
- NHK Educational TV, a Japanese television channel
- Education 22, one of the former names of TVM+, a Maltese television channel

== See also ==
- Educated, a 2018 memoir by Tara Westover
- Educating..., a British television documentary series
