= Agnes Taubert =

German philosopher (1844–1877)

- Born: Agnes Marie Constanze Taubert; 7 January 1844; Stralsund, Kingdom of Prussia
- Died: 8 May 1877 (aged 33); Berlin, German Empire
- Other names: Agnes Marie Constanze von Hartmann; A. T.; A. Taubert
- Spouse: Eduard von Hartmann (m. 1872)
- Children: 1

Philosophical work
- Era: 19th-century philosophy
- Region: Western philosophy
- School: Post-Schopenhauerian pessimism
- Notable works: Philosophie gegen naturwissenschaftliche Ueberhebung (1872); Der Pessimismus und seine Gegner (1873; translated as Pessimism and Its Opponents)
- Notable ideas: Philosophical pessimism (eudaimonological value of life; existence and non-existence); Empirical approach to the pessimism question

Agnes Marie Constanze von Hartmann (née Taubert; 7 January 1844 – 8 May 1877), who wrote under the names A. T. and A. Taubert, was a German philosopher associated with post-Schopenhauerian pessimism. Born in Stralsund and later based in Berlin, she married the philosopher Eduard von Hartmann in 1872 and wrote in defence of his Philosophy of the Unconscious (1869). She published two books, Philosophie gegen naturwissenschaftliche Ueberhebung (1872) and Der Pessimismus und seine Gegner (1873; translated as Pessimism and Its Opponents). Frederick C. Beiser has described her as a participant in the German pessimism controversy and as one of the first women to have a prominent role in a public intellectual debate in Germany.

== Biography ==
=== Early and personal life ===
Agnes Marie Constanze Taubert was born on 7 January 1844 in Stralsund, Kingdom of Prussia, to Albert Hartmann Taubert and Friederike Agnes Wilhelmine Taubert. She was baptised on 1 February in Pomerania. Her father was an artillery colonel who was acquainted with the father of the philosopher Eduard von Hartmann. In 1872, she married von Hartmann in Berlin-Charlottenburg, and the couple had one child.

=== Career ===
Taubert supported her husband's Philosophy of the Unconscious and wrote two books under the pen names A. T. and A. Taubert. Both works defended Hartmann's ideas while also criticising aspects of them. Beiser states that publishing under a pen name meant that Taubert was not identified as a woman philosopher and that her work was received as if it had been written by a man.

Beiser argues that Taubert's books, Philosophie gegen naturwissenschaftliche Ueberhebung (1872) and Der Pessimismus und seine Gegner (1873; translated as Pessimism and Its Opponents), played a role in the pessimism controversy in Germany. According to von Hartmann's publisher, Carl Heymons, Taubert was closely involved in planning and managing Hartmann's responses to critics during the controversy.

In her work, Taubert defined the central problem of philosophical pessimism as "a matter of measuring the eudaimonological value of life in order to determine whether existence is preferable to non-existence or not." Like Hartmann, she argued that the question could be addressed through empirical observation.

=== Death ===
Taubert died in Berlin on 8 May 1877, aged 33, of "an attack of a rheumatism of the joints", which was described as "extremely painful".

== Reception ==
Beiser has described Taubert as "one of the first women to have a prominent role in a public intellectual debate in Germany". He has also referred to Taubert and Olga Plümacher as forgotten philosophers of the late 19th century. In a 2018 post for the American Philosophical Association, Carol Bensick compared Taubert with Plümacher and Amalie J. Hathaway in the context of the pessimism controversy.

Beiser contributed a chapter on Taubert and Plümacher, titled "Two Female Pessimists", to the 2024 volume The Oxford Handbook of Nineteenth-Century Women Philosophers in the German Tradition.

In 2023, Ediciones Sequitur published a Spanish translation of Taubert's Der Pessimismus und seine Gegner, titled El pesimismo y sus adversarios.

== Works ==
- T., A. (1872). Philosophie gegen naturwissenschaftliche Ueberhebung: eine Zurechtweisung des Dr. med. Geo. Stiebeling und seiner angeblichen Widerlegung der Hartmann'schen Lehre vom Unbewußten in der Leiblichkeit [Philosophy Against the Overreach of the Natural Sciences: A Reply to Dr. Med. Geo. Stiebeling and His Purported Refutation of Hartmann's Doctrine of the Unconscious in Bodily Existence] (in German). Berlin: Duncker. OCLC 555590478.
- Taubert, A. (1873). Der Pessimismus und seine Gegner [Pessimism and Its Opponents] (in German). Berlin: Carl Duncker's Verlag (C. Heymons). OCLC 16408190.
