= Olga Plümacher =

Swiss-American philosopher (1839–1895)

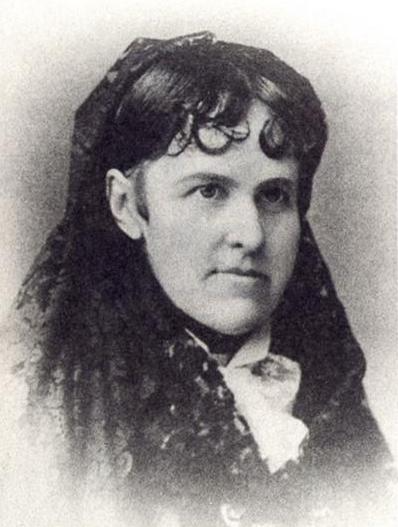
- Born: Olga Marie Pauline Hünerwadel; 27 May 1839; Tsaritsyn, Russia
- Died: c. 15 June 1895 (aged 56); Beersheba Springs, Tennessee, U.S.
- Resting place: Armfield Cemetery, Beersheba Springs; 35.46872°N 85.65509°W
- Other name: O. Plümacher
- Spouse: Eugene Hermann Plümacher
- Children: 2

Philosophical work
- Era: 19th-century philosophy
- Region: Western philosophy
- School: Post-Schopenhauerian pessimism
- Language: German; English

Olga Marie Pauline Plümacher (Note: Russian: Ольга Мари Паулина Плюмахер, romanized: Olga Mari Paulina Plyumakher) (née Hünerwadel; (Note: Russian: Хюнервадель, romanized: Khyunervadel) 27 May 1839 – c. 15 June 1895), who wrote under the name O. Plümacher, was a Russian-born Swiss-American philosopher. She wrote on the philosophies of Arthur Schopenhauer and Eduard von Hartmann, and published three books that contributed to the pessimism controversy in Germany. Her book Der Pessimismus in Vergangenheit und Gegenwart ("Pessimism in the Past and Present") was read and annotated by Friedrich Nietzsche and Samuel Beckett.

== Biography ==
=== Early life ===
Olga Marie Pauline Hünerwadel was born on 27 May 1839 in Tsaritsyn, Russia. She was the daughter of Gottlieb Samuel Hünerwadel, a former officer in France under Napoleon, and his cousin Adelheid Hünerwadel. Her two older brothers died before she was born. The family moved to Switzerland, where her father managed a steel plant and later retired to Zürich, where Plümacher grew up. She received no formal university education.

=== Family and intellectual circle ===
Plümacher married the German Eugene Hermann Plümacher, who later served as U.S. Consul to Venezuela; the couple had two children. She emigrated with her family to the United States and lived in Beersheba Springs, Tennessee.

In 1877, Plümacher returned to Switzerland with her children for ten years so that they could be educated there. During this period, she renewed her friendship with Emilie Kammerer, a childhood acquaintance and the mother of the German playwright Frank Wedekind. Plümacher introduced Wedekind to the philosophies of Arthur Schopenhauer and Eduard von Hartmann. She has been described as Wedekind's "philosophical aunt".

=== Philosophical work ===
Plümacher published three books in Germany that engaged with the philosophies of Schopenhauer and von Hartmann: Der Kampf um's Unbewusste ("The Battle for the Unconscious"), Zwei Individualisten der Schopenhauer'schen Schule ("Two Individualists of the Schopenhauer School"), and Der Pessimismus in Vergangenheit und Gegenwart ("Pessimism in the Past and Present").

Frederick C. Beiser describes Plümacher as a participant in the pessimism controversy in Germany. Because she published under the name O. Plümacher, some readers discussed her as if she were a man. Der Pessimismus in Vergangenheit und Gegenwart influenced Friedrich Nietzsche, who annotated his personal copy throughout.

Plümacher also published articles on psychology, philosophy and metaphysics in German journals. In English, she wrote an article on von Hartmann for Mind.

=== Death ===
Plümacher died in Beersheba Springs around 15 June 1895, aged 56, and was buried in the town's Armfield Cemetery.

== Reception ==
Samuel Beckett first read Der Pessimismus in Vergangenheit und Gegenwart around 1938. He annotated the book throughout and added blank pages for additional notes.

Rolf Kieser, a professor of German at the State University of New York, published a biography of Plümacher in 1990, Olga Plümacher-Hünerwadel, eine gelehrte Frau des neunzehnten Jahrhunderts ("Olga Plümacher-Hünerwadel, a Learned Woman of the Nineteenth Century").

Plümacher has been compared to Agnes Taubert, another woman philosopher who contributed to the pessimism controversy, and to the German-American philosopher Amalie J. Hathaway.

Plümacher was discussed in the 2022 special issue of the British Journal for the History of Philosophy titled "Lost Voices: On Counteracting Exclusion of Women From Histories of Contemporary Philosophy", and in the 2024 Oxford Handbook of Nineteenth-Century Women Philosophers in the German Tradition.

== Selected publications ==
=== Articles ===
- "Pessimism". Mind. 4 (13): 68–89. 1879. doi:10.1093/mind/os-4.13.68. ISSN 0026-4423.

=== Books ===
- Der Kampf um's Unbewusste ("The Struggle for the Subconscious", 1881)
- Zwei Individualisten der Schopenhauer'schen Schule ("Two Individualists from the Schopenhauer School", 1881)
- Der Pessimismus in Vergangenheit und Gegenwart ("Pessimism in the Past and Present", 1883)
