= Jennifer Herdt =

American philosopher

Jennifer A. Herdt

Education
- Education: Princeton University (MA, PhD), Oberlin College (BA)
- Thesis: Fatal divisions: Hume on religion, sympathy, and the peace of society (1994)
- Doctoral advisor: Jeffrey Stout

Philosophical work
- Era: 21st-century philosophy
- Region: Western philosophy
- Institutions: Yale Divinity School
- Main interests: Moral philosophy

Jennifer A. Herdt is an American philosopher and Gilbert L. Stark Professor of Christian Ethics and Senior Associate Dean for Academic Affairs at Yale Divinity School. She is known for her works on moral philosophy.

== Books ==
- Forming Humanity: Redeeming the German Bildung Tradition (Chicago, 2019) ISBN 9780226836904
- Putting On Virtue: The Legacy of the Splendid Vices (Chicago, 2008) ISBN 9780226327242
- Religion and Faction in Hume’s Moral Philosophy (Cambridge, 1997, 2008) ISBN 9780521073080
