= Eugene Plumacher =

German-American diplomat (1838–1910)

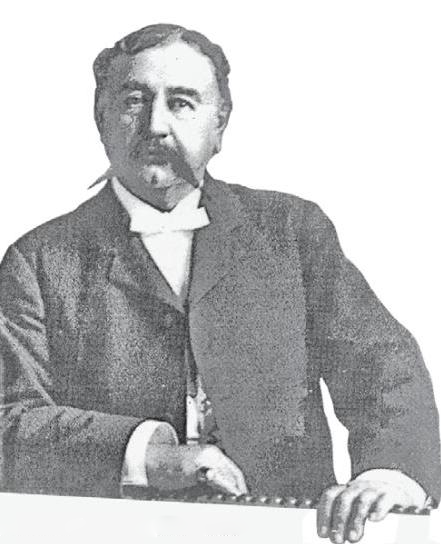
- Born: Eugene Hermann Plümacher; March 7, 1838; Elberfeld, Kingdom of Prussia
- Died: September 25, 1910 (aged 72); Washington D.C., U.S.
- Resting place: Glenwood Cemetery, Washington D.C., U.S.
- Occupations: Diplomant, military officer, university professor
- Spouse: Olga Marie Pauline Hünerwadel
- Children: 2

Eugene Hermann Plumacher (March 7, 1838 – September 25, 1910) was a German-American diplomat, who served as U.S. consul to Maracaibo, Venezuela, from 1877 until 1890. He started his career as an officer in the Royal Netherlands Navy and Swiss Army, later serving in the Union army as a colonel and working as a university professor.

== Biography ==
Eugene Hermann Plumacher was born in Elberfeld in the Kingdom of Prussia, on March 7, 1838. He was educated in Germany, Switzerland, and France and, in 1859, enrolled in the Royal Netherlands Navy as a third officer of the East India Naval Service; his naval career lasted six years. In 1865, he accepted a commission in the Swiss Army as Lieutenant of Cavalry in a cavalry company. He was later promoted to captain in the Swiss Army.

Plumacher later married the philosopher Olga Marie Pauline Hünerwadel; they had two children. The family later emigrated to the United States where he helped establish the Swiss colony of Beersheba Springs, Tennessee. He served as a colonel in the Union Army during the American Civil War.

Plumacher later survived a bout of yellow fever and relayed reports on upheavals and conflicts in Maracaibo, which is now part of Venezuela. He studied lepers and leprosy, postulating that it was a hereditary condition. He also worked as a university professor in Tennessee.

The Chicago Inter Ocean reported in 1903 that Plumacher discouraged would-be successors to his consular post by describing the prevalence of deadly diseases and other hazards associated with the position. Plumacher also corresponded with Dr. Charles Sajous. Plumacher corresponded with Dr. Charles Sajous. In his memoirs, he wrote about various aspects of life in Maracaibo.

Plumacher retired from his consul position in 1910 and died in Washington, D.C., on September 25 of the same year. He was buried in Glenwood Cemetery, Washington, D.C.

== Publications ==
- Plumacher, Eugene H. Memorias ("Memoirs"). 1912
