= The Human Predicament =

2017 philosophy book by David Benatar

The Human Predicament: A Candid Guide to Life’s Biggest Questions
- Author: David Benatar
- Language: English
- Subject: Philosophical pessimism
- Genre: Philosophy
- Publisher: Oxford University Press
- Publication date: June 7, 2017
- Publication place: South Africa
- Pages: 288
- ISBN: 978-0190633813
- OCLC: 974566754

The Human Predicament: A Candid Guide to Life's Biggest Questions is a philosophy book by David Benatar, which makes a case for philosophical pessimism, published by Oxford University Press in 2017. The book presents Benatar's views on a range of philosophical issues, arguing, among other topics, that having children is immoral, that death is bad despite much of human life being spent in suffering, and that suicide may be a morally justified action more often than is commonly assumed. The Human Predicament has been favorably compared to The Conspiracy Against the Human Race by Thomas Ligotti, the worldview presented in Ecclesiastes, and the works of philosopher Thomas Metzinger.

== Summary ==
Benatar posits that there are multiple types of meaning, ranging from the cosmic to the terrestrial perspectives. Terrestrial meaning is obtainable (by having importance to family or community, for example), but there is no cosmic meaning to human existence. He argues that the world is more bad than good, but most people don't recognize it as such. Here's why: (x). One might think that if existence is of such poor quality, then death would be a good. Benatar opposes such an ideology, and argues that death is in fact bad for the following reasons: (x). He then discusses the issue of immortality, concludes that it would be a good option to be able to have in certain conditions. Not having that option is part of the human predicament. Benatar then discusses suicide, and its moral status. Benatar dismisses it as a solution to the human predicament, but holds that it may sometimes be rational, in cases where the bad of death is less horrific than the bad of continued life. Suicide is, however, always tragic, due to both its effect on others and because it involves the annihilation of an individual. Benatar then considers other possible responses to the human predicament, and defends his overall worldview.

== Background ==
In 1997, Benatar published the paper "Why It Is Better Never to Come into Existence", arguing that "being brought into existence is not a benefit but always a harm," and that as such, procreation is—in most situations—morally wrong. As a consequence, Benatar argued that it would be optimal for the human race to voluntarily go extinct.

== Reception ==
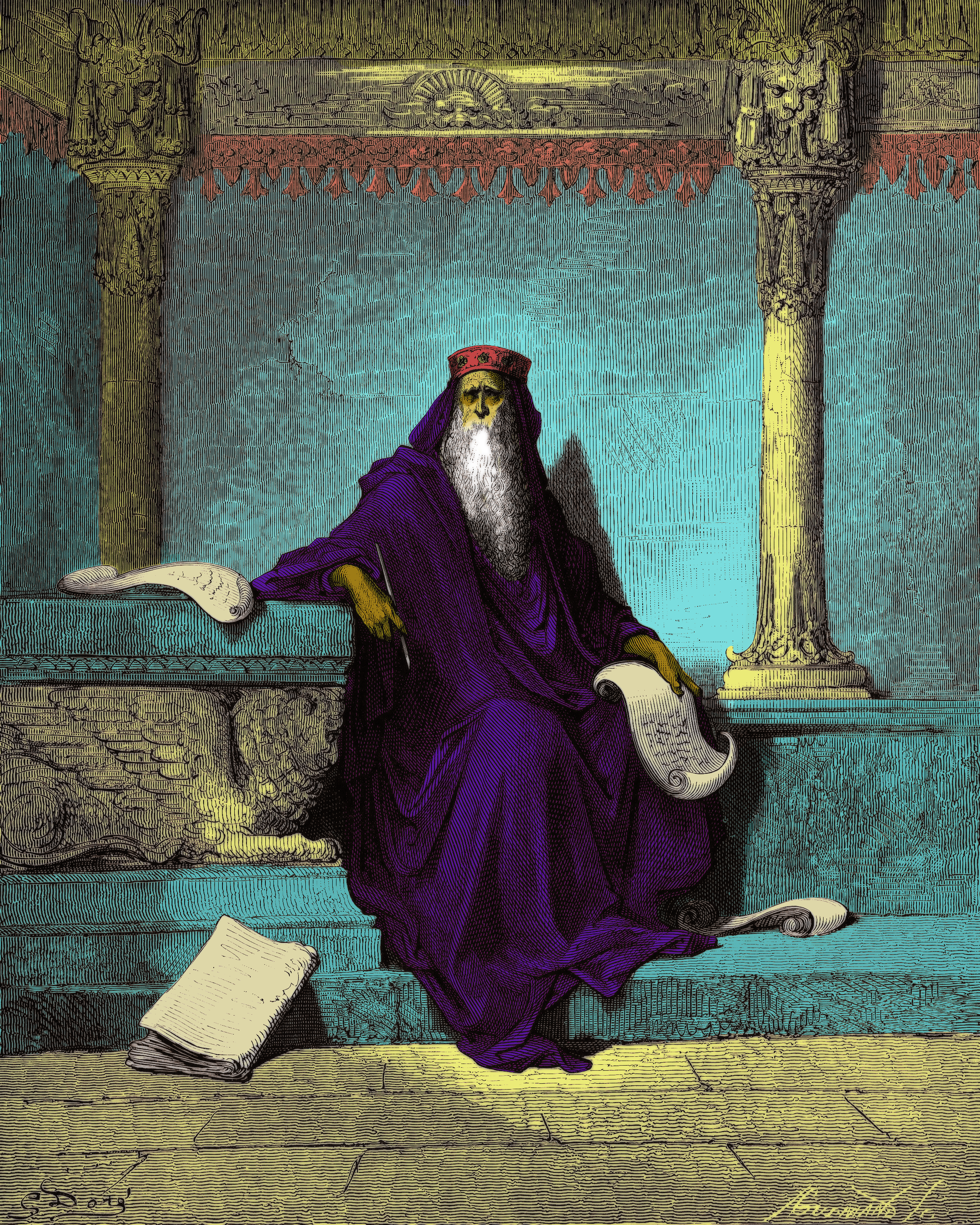
Colorized version of "King Solomon in Old Age" by Gustave Doré (1866); a depiction of the purported author of Ecclesiastes, according to rabbinic tradition.

In a review in The Philosophical Quarterly, David Matheson praised the book's analysis of the practical implications of accepting philosophical pessimism, but took issue with what he calls "the perfectionist criterion" inherent in many of Benatar's arguments for the badness of life itself:

Let ‘BADNESS_{m}’ be shorthand for ‘things that fall on the negative side of a relevant measure m’....If the BADNESS_{m} of a (human) life l is significantly greater than the BADNESS_{m} of the best (human) life we can conceive of, then l is bad when judged by measure m.

Matheson points out that such a criterion would not be accepted as plausible in other fields of philosophy, using aesthetics as an example: If one posits that all art which is in some way "worse" (in an aesthetic sense) than the greatest work of art conceivable is bad, then that would lead to the conclusion that all non-perfect existing artwork is aesthetically bad, which doesn't align with typical definitions of "badness".

In an earlier 2017 paper The Incoherence of Soft Nihilism, Matheson classifies Benatar—together with Arthur Schopenhauer, Albert Camus, and Thomas Nagel—as a proponent of what he refers to as "soft nihilism," or the belief that there is overall negative value in being alive (as compared to what Matheson calls "affirmationism," which holds the reverse), but that "it can be better, all things considered, for us to continue living in a certain way than for us to cease living altogether." He contrasts this with what he calls "hard nihilism," a nihilistic position that holds death or suicide to be the (perhaps only) logical response to the human predicament. Matheson proceeds to argue that soft nihilism is incoherent, via the following argument:

1. If soft nihilism is true, then nihilism is true.
2. If nihilism is true, then no lives are, all things considered, better lived than not lived.
3. If soft nihilism is true, then it can be better, all things considered, for us to continue living in a certain way than for us to cease living altogether.
4. If it can be better, all things considered, for us to continue living in a certain way than for us to cease living altogether, then some lives are, all things considered, better lived than not lived.
5. If soft nihilism is true, then no lives are, all things considered, better lived than not lived. (From steps 1 and 2.)
6. If soft nihilism is true, then some lives are, all things considered, better lived than not lived. (From steps 3 and 4.)
7. If soft nihilism is true, then no lives are, all things considered, better lived than not lived and – contradiction – some lives are, all things considered, better lived than not lived. (From steps 5 and 6.)
8. Soft nihilism is false. (From step 7.)

Andrew Spalding of the Centre for Christian Apologetics, Scholarship and Education (CASE) gave a qualified defense of Benatar's work from the perspective of Christian apologetics, noting that "a lot of what he says resonates strongly with the biblical pessimist known as Qohelet (or Ecclesiastes)," in Benatar's assessment of the low quality of human life, and in his advice to use distraction as a coping mechanism. However, Spalding criticizes Benatar's anti-natalist conclusion, noting that while his logic is solid if one does not believe in God, the absurdity of his conclusions should have led him to rethink his base atheistic assumptions.

Ema Sullivan-Bissett of The American Journal of Bioethics praised The Human Predicament for its "compassionate exposition of the appalling nature of our lives, extremely careful argumentation, and persuasive style." At the same time, she questioned Benatar's stance on suicide on the grounds that while suicide does not fully solve the human predicament, it may resolve some issues, and "partial solutions can be appropriate" as a rational response to one's predicament. She also criticized Benatar's stance that if life "feels worth continuing, then it is obviously not so burdensome as to make one prefer death, even if objectively one would be better off dead,” (188) as being self-contradictory, as Benatar also holds that "the rationality of procreation based on objective quality of the life brought into existence cannot be trumped by the perceived quality of the life created. All lives are appalling, so all lives are not worth starting (thoroughly defended in Benatar 2006). This is the case even if one knew that one’s child would subjectively evaluate her life extremely positively." However, if Benatar genuinely holds the aforementioned views on suicide, "then why does Benatar think that is it not permissible to create people who would also not take their lives to be sufficiently burdensome so that they prefer death? Or even to create people who prefer that they had come into existence?"

== See also ==
- Philosophical pessimism
- The Conspiracy Against the Human Race
- The Last Messiah
