= Education (journal) =

- Discipline: Education
- Language: English
- Edited by: Phil Feldman

Publication details
- History: 1880–present
- Publisher: Project Innovation
- Frequency: Quarterly

Standard abbreviations
- ISO 4: Education (Chula Vista)

Indexing
- CODEN: EDUCD6
- ISSN: 0013-1172
- LCCN: 06010193
- OCLC no.: 67115257

Links
- Journal homepage

Education is a quarterly peer-reviewed academic journal covering education. It was established in 1880 by the New England Publishing Company of Boston. The journal is edited by Phil Feldman and is currently published by Project Innovation, a publisher that was on Beall's list before it was taken down in 2017.

== Abstracting and indexing ==
The journal is indexed and abstracted in the following bibliographic databases:

- EBSCO databases
- Education Resources Information Center
- Linguistics & Language Behavior Abstracts
- Modern Language Association Database
- ProQuest databases
