= Frederick C. Beiser =

American philosopher

- Born: Frederick Charles Beiser; November 27, 1949 (age 76); Albert Lea, Minnesota, U.S.

Academic background
- Education: Shimer College; Oriel College, Oxford; Wolfson College, Oxford
- Thesis: The Spirit of the Phenomenology: Hegel's Resurrection of Metaphysics in the Phänomenologie des Geistes (1981)
- Doctoral advisor: Isaiah Berlin; Charles Taylor

Academic work
- Discipline: Philosophy
- Institutions: University of Pennsylvania; Yale University; Indiana University Bloomington; Syracuse University
- Notable ideas: Reinterpretation of German idealism as a struggle against subjectivism

Frederick Charles Beiser (/ˈbaɪzər/; born November 27, 1949) is an American philosopher who is professor emeritus of philosophy at Syracuse University. He is best known for his work on German idealism and has also written on the German Romantics and 19th-century British philosophy.

== Life and career ==
Beiser was born on November 27, 1949, in Albert Lea, Minnesota. In 1971, Beiser received a bachelor's degree from Shimer College, a Great Books college then located in Mount Carroll, Illinois. He then studied at the Oriel College of the University of Oxford, where he received a Bachelor of Arts degree in philosophy, politics and economics in 1974. He subsequently studied at the London School of Economics and Political Science from 1974 to 1975. Beiser earned his Doctor of Philosophy (DPhil) degree in philosophy at Wolfson College, Oxford, in 1980, under the direction of Charles Taylor and Isaiah Berlin. His doctoral thesis was titled The Spirit of the Phenomenology: Hegel's Resurrection of Metaphysics in the Phänomenologie des Geistes.

After receiving his DPhil in 1980, Beiser moved to West Germany, where he was a Thyssen Research Fellow at the Free University of Berlin. He returned to the United States four years later. He joined the University of Pennsylvania's faculty in 1984, staying there until 1985. He then spent the springs of 1986 and 1987 at the University of Wisconsin–Madison and University of Colorado Boulder, respectively.

In 1988, Beiser moved again to West Germany, where he was a Humboldt Research Fellow at the Free University of Berlin. He returned to the United States in 1990 to take up a professorship at Indiana University Bloomington, where he remained until 2001. During his tenure at Indiana, he spent time teaching at Yale University. He joined Syracuse University in 2001, where he is now emeritus. He also taught at Harvard University during the spring of 2002.

He received a Guggenheim Fellowship for his research in 1994, and was awarded the Order of Merit of the Federal Republic of Germany in 2015.

== Philosophical work ==
In 1987, Beiser released his first book, The Fate of Reason: German Philosophy from Kant to Fichte (Harvard University Press). In the book, Beiser sought to reconstruct the background of German idealism through the narration of the story of the Spinoza or Pantheism controversy. Consequently, a great many figures, whose importance was hardly recognized by the English-speaking philosophers, were given their proper due. The work won the Thomas J. Wilson Memorial Prize for best first book. He has since edited two Cambridge anthologies on Hegel, The Cambridge Companion to Hegel (1993) and The Cambridge Companion to Hegel and Nineteenth-Century Philosophy (2008), and written a number of books on German philosophy and the English Enlightenment. He also edited The Early Political Writings of the German Romantics (Cambridge University Press) in 1996.

Beiser is notable amongst English-language scholars for his defense of the metaphysical aspects of German idealism (e.g. Naturphilosophie), both in their centrality to any historical understanding of German idealism, as well as their continued relevance to contemporary philosophy.

== Works ==
=== Authored ===
- The Fate of Reason: German Philosophy from Kant to Fichte. Harvard University Press. 1987.
- Enlightenment, Revolution, and Romanticism: The Genesis of Modern German Political Thought, 1790–1800. Harvard University Press. 1992.
- The Sovereignty of Reason: The Defense of Rationality in Early English Enlightenment. Princeton University Press. 1996.
- German Idealism: The Struggle Against Subjectivism, 1781–1801. Harvard University Press. 2002.
- The Romantic Imperative: The Concept of Early German Romanticism. Harvard University Press. 2004.
- Schiller as Philosopher: A Re-Examination. Oxford University Press. 2005.
- Hegel. Routledge. 2005.
- Diotima's Children: German Aesthetic Rationalism from Leibniz to Lessing. Oxford University Press. 2009.
- The German Historicist Tradition. Oxford University Press. 2011.
- Late German Idealism: Trendelenburg and Lotze. Oxford University Press. 2013.
- After Hegel: German Philosophy, 1840–1900. Princeton University Press. 2014.
- The Genesis of Neo-Kantianism, 1796–1880. Oxford University Press. 2014.
- Weltschmerz: Pessimism in German Philosophy, 1860–1900. Oxford University Press. 2016.
- Hermann Cohen: An Intellectual Biography. Oxford University Press. 2018.
- David Friedrich Strauß, Father of Unbelief: An Intellectual Biography. Oxford University Press. 2020.
- Johann Friedrich Herbart: Grandfather of Analytic Philosophy. Oxford University Press. 2022
- Philosophy of Life: German Lebensphilosophie 1870–1920. Oxford University Press. 2023.
- The Berlin Antisemitism Controversy. Routledge. 2024.
- Early German Positivism. Oxford University Press. 2025.

=== Edited ===
- The Cambridge Companion to Hegel. Cambridge University Press. 1996.
- The Early Political Writings of the German Romantics. Cambridge University Press. 1996.
- The Cambridge Companion to Hegel and Nineteenth-Century Philosophy. Cambridge University Press. 2008.
