= Romantic psychology =

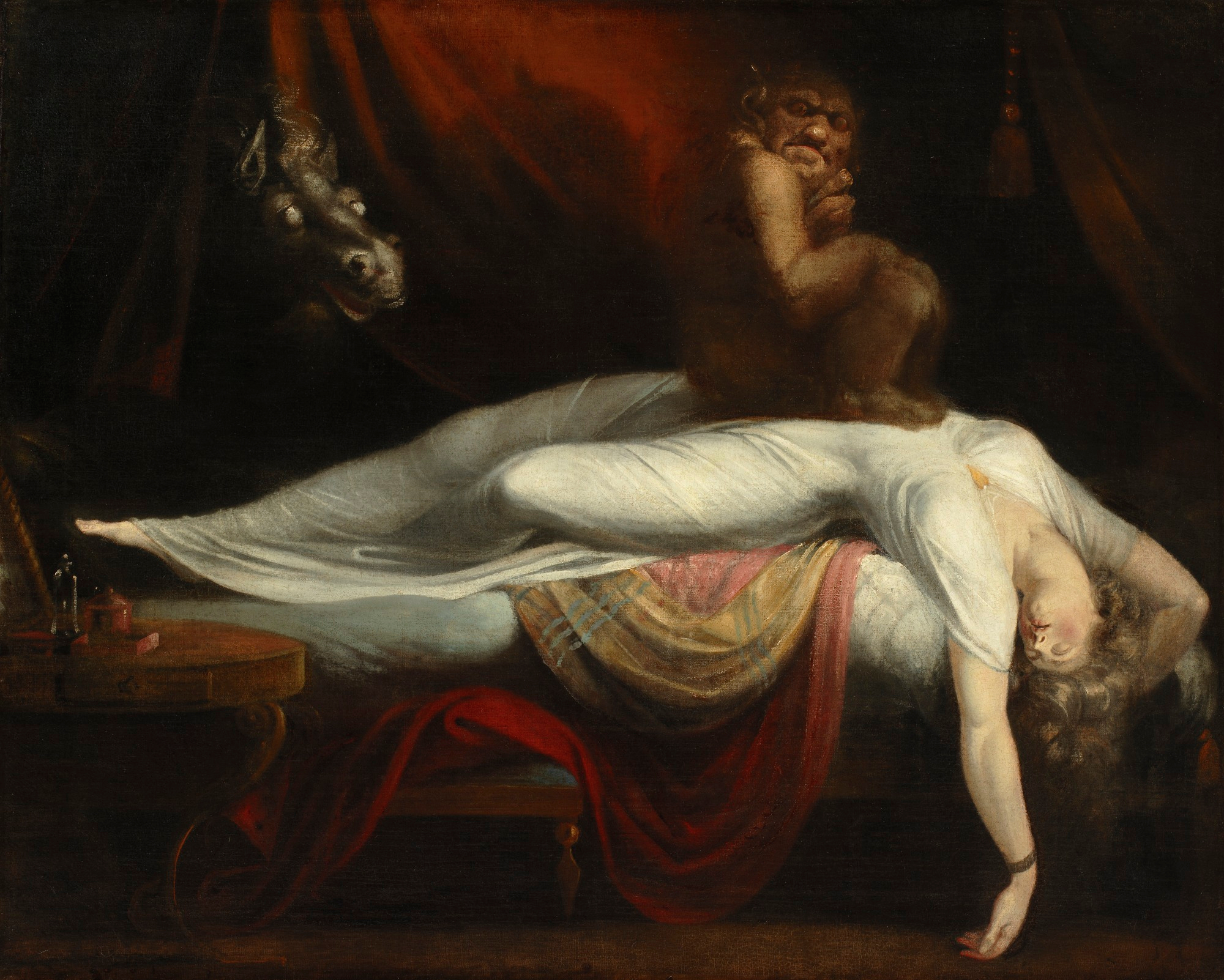
The Nightmare, by the Romantic painter Johann Heinrich Füssli. It depicts the anguish of the "waking dream".

Romantic psychology was an intellectual movement that emerged in the late 18th and early 19th centuries in Europe, particularly in Germany. It was a response to the Enlightenment's emphasis on reason and rationality, which Romantic psychologists believed neglected the importance of emotions, imagination, and intuition in human experience.

Romantic psychology is characterized by its philosophical approach, its interest in subjectivity and personal experience, and its attachment to the concept of the soul or spirit. It emphasizes the subjective experience of the individual and focuses on the study of emotions, intuition and imagination.

Romantic psychologists sought to understand the links between the mind and the body, as well as the unconscious processes of the human psyche. Major subjects in the field of Romantic psychology included mystical ecstasy, poetic and artistic inspiration, and dreams. The concepts associated with it are now seen as the origin of dynamic psychology. The role of Romantic psychology in the emergence of psychoanalysis and analytical psychology remains controversial.

== Overview ==
Romantic psychology emerged at the beginning of the 19th century from German Romanticism and nature philosophy. It was closely linked to the natural sciences and encompassed diverse conceptions of the mind that focused on the intimate relationship between the psyche, natural forces, and the cultural background of societies. This movement flourished primarily in German-speaking countries and was characterized by the introduction of philosophical concerns into the "sciences of the soul". Its key themes revolved around the dynamism and unity of body and mind. The notion of the unconscious was fundamental, and it was within this movement that the unconscious first appeared as an essential aspect of the mind.

Romantic psychology was not so much an application of the theses of philosophical Romanticism to the field of psychology as a particular development of the Romantic philosophy of nature. The creed of this philosophy proclaimed the unity of the world and man in an organic and cosmic totality, which excluded all dualism. Nature, and with it the mind, was interpreted as a living fabric to be deciphered by analogical correspondences. The God/nature relationship was identical to the soul/body relationship, as the soul was the divine Idea that lived an individual existence in nature. While the notion of the unconscious was not yet developed, an invisible "world-spirit" (Weltgeist) or "world soul" (Weltseele) was supposed to be at work deep in the visible world and the human soul.

Although Johann Herder is considered to be the precursor of this school of thought, and Goethe its first great representative, it was Friedrich Schelling who became its central figure at the turn of the 18th and 19th centuries. From his perspective, the researcher had to penetrate beyond visible nature and uncover the secrets of the "foundation" (Grund) of nature, where the foundation of the soul could also be found.

== Philosophical aspects ==
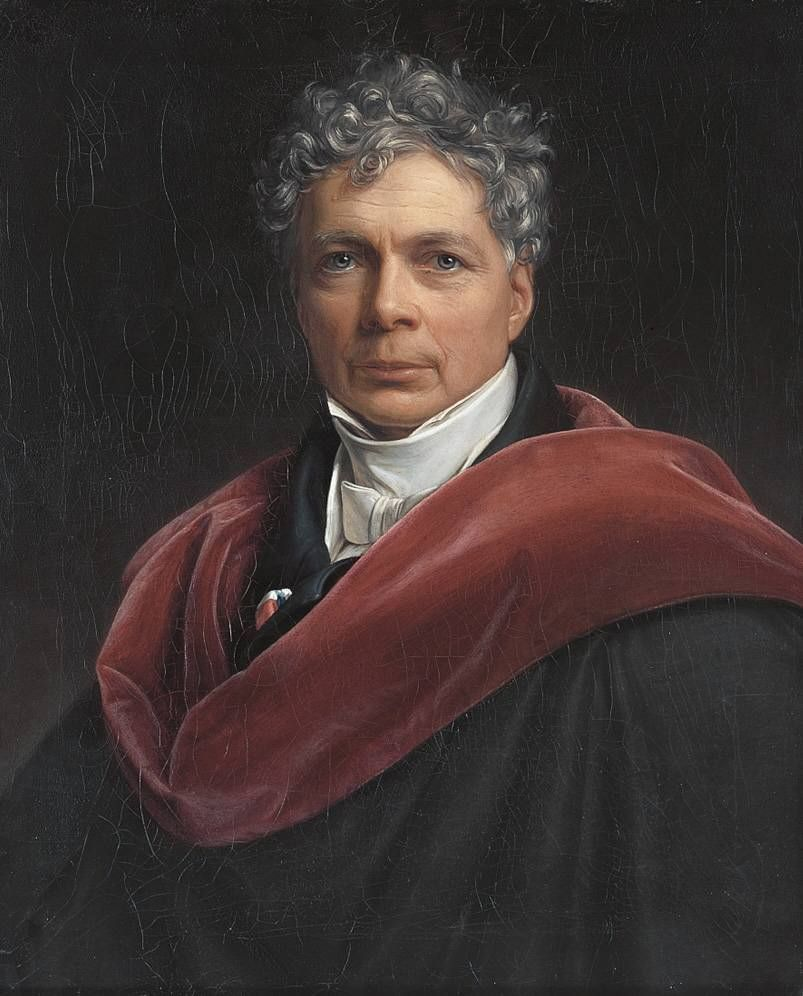
Portrait of Friedrich Schelling (1835).

Romantic psychology reflected a broader cultural shift away from the rationalism and materialism of the Enlightenment and towards a more subjective, emotional, and holistic view of human experience. One of its key philosophical aspects was its rejection of the Enlightenment view of the mind as a rational, mechanistic entity. Instead, Romantic thinkers emphasized the importance of the subjective experience of the individual, seeing the mind as a complex and mysterious realm full of contradictions and paradoxes. They also insisted on the role of the imagination in shaping human experience. Romantic thinkers believed that the imagination had the power to transcend the limitations of reason and logic, enabling individuals to access deeper truths and higher levels of consciousness.

Friedrich Schelling, a German philosopher, is considered the founder of Romantic school of psychology. At the heart of Schelling's philosophy was the idea of the inseparable unity of nature and the human spirit within the Absolute – an invisible but universal spiritual foundation of the world. He interpreted the entire world, including its most material forms, as a living organism subject to a single spiritual principle, the "world soul" (Weltseele), which produced matter, then living nature, and finally human consciousness through its own unfolding and a series of successive generations.

According to Schelling, the non-organic material world, organic nature, and the various realms of living beings differed only in their degree of perfection and fundamentally obeyed the same laws, which were the laws of life or spirit. The discovery of the laws governing one realm could reveal those governing the other realms through the process of analogy. Schelling often expressed himself through images or metaphors, using analogy to found a psychology based on the examination of nature and to develop a science of nature based on the introspective data discovered by the human mind. His ideas and approach have been taken up and developed by other Romantic philosophers such as Schubert and Troxler.

== Theme of the Unconscious ==
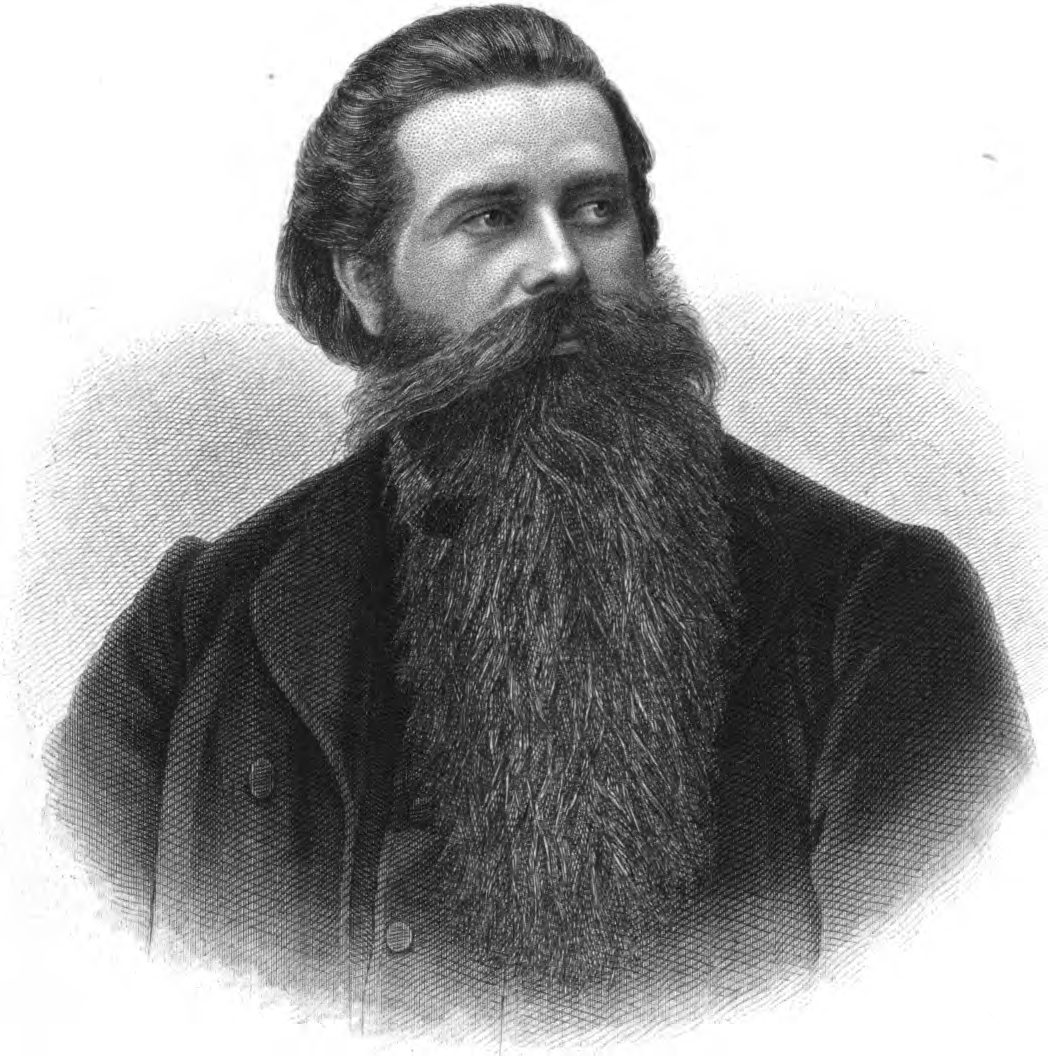
Eduard von Hartmann (engraving from 1882).

The notion of the unconscious is historically linked to the development of the philosophy of nature, or Naturphilosophie, at the beginning of the 19th century. Naturphilosophie was based on the idea of a unitary organism that underlies each individual being and constitutes the deep and unconscious unity of the world (it is then identified with the Absolute). This idea, launched by Schelling and the early Naturphilosophen, was developed by Carus, Fechner, and Hartmann. The dream was interpreted by them as a partial and temporary return of the conscious individual to the universal sphere of the unconscious.

Carl Gustav Carus, a physician, naturalist, and romantic painter, presented in his work "Psyche" one of the first theories of unconscious psychological life, generalized to all aspects of psychic and organic life. He assigned to psychology ("science of the soul") the role of exploring the unconscious essence of the mind, deeply buried within it. This particular science had to begin by discovering the effects of the unconscious on the conscious life of individuals, without limiting its investigation to that of the human mind, and then infer the laws that govern the unconscious. The dream became a privileged place of exploration of the unconscious for psychology because the individual periodically encounters it during sleep.

Author of a work entitled Philosophy of the Unconscious, which was published in its first edition in 1869, Eduard von Hartmann became famous for developing a conception of the world based on a unique principle that was both metaphysical and psychological: the "Unconscious". According to von Hartmann, the primary reality of the physical and organic world was of the same order and essence as the mind. There were a conscious psyche and an organic or unconscious psyche that were both more fundamental and more universal than consciousness, which primarily determined organic and instinctive life. The Unconscious was itself an intelligent principle that animates all of nature through forces that act at the deepest levels of matter as well as on the scale of the universe. It was distinguished from consciousness not by its nature, but by its structure, which indissolubly unites will and intelligence.

Hartmann's philosophy of the Unconscious, as developed in his eponymous work, allowed for the creation of an introspective psychology conceived as a privileged path to access the essence of reality. It is because consciousness is not of a different nature than the unconscious being of the world that a psychological knowledge of this being is possible, although only its ideal content (the "idea" or the "representation") is accessible to us through this path. The unconscious will, on the other hand, remains inaccessible to introspection and can only be laboriously inferred from observations of the world.

== Dreams ==
Dreams were a significant aspect of Romantic psychology, which saw them as a window into the deeper aspects of the human psyche. Many Romantic thinkers believed that dreams were not only a product of the imagination but were intimately linked to the unconscious mind and the spiritual world.

Former student of Schelling, the physicist and naturalist G.H. von Schubert was representative of this romantic interpretation of dreams. He developed a highly poetic vision of nature and the human soul, presenting striking similarities with some concepts of Freud and Jung. In a work published in 1814 entitled "The Symbolism of Dreams", he elaborated a metaphysics of dreams and states of unconsciousness, which he believed could provide a more universal and profound knowledge than that of intellect. Through his research based on the principle of analogy, Schubert thought he had discovered that dream, poetry, religion, and myth had in common a universal and innate language, taking its source in the "nocturnal sides" of our being that he already called "unconscious".

For Schubert, when a man falls asleep, his mind begins to think in an imagined language, while in the waking state he uses verbal language. It is a "hieroglyphic" language in the sense that it can condense several images or ideas into a single representation, thus constituting a "sort of higher algebra" with a poetic character. This language reveals the ambiguity of the various manifestations of the human soul, ambiguity that Schubert explains by the myth of the fall from grace. Following this fall, the original harmony between man and nature disappeared, and the universe became indecipherable to him.

== Madness ==
In Romantic psychology, madness was often viewed as an essential aspect of human nature rather than a disease to be cured. For Romantic thinkers like Friedrich Schelling, the human mind was a complex and mysterious realm full of contradictions and paradoxes. Madness was seen as the expression of this complexity, a manifestation of the deeper forces that lay hidden beneath the surface of everyday consciousness. It was not considered as a mental illness to be treated but as a fundamental aspect of human nature to be explored.

Romantic psychologists rejected the Enlightenment view of the mind as a rational, orderly machine and instead emphasized the importance of emotion, intuition, and imagination. Madness was viewed as an extreme form of these qualities, a state of mind in which the boundaries between self and other, reason and unreason, and reality and fantasy dissolved. They also believed that madness could serve as a source of creativity and inspiration. Many artists and writers were thought to be "touched by madness," their artistic genius arising from a deep connection to the irrational and the unconscious.

== Romantic psychiatry ==
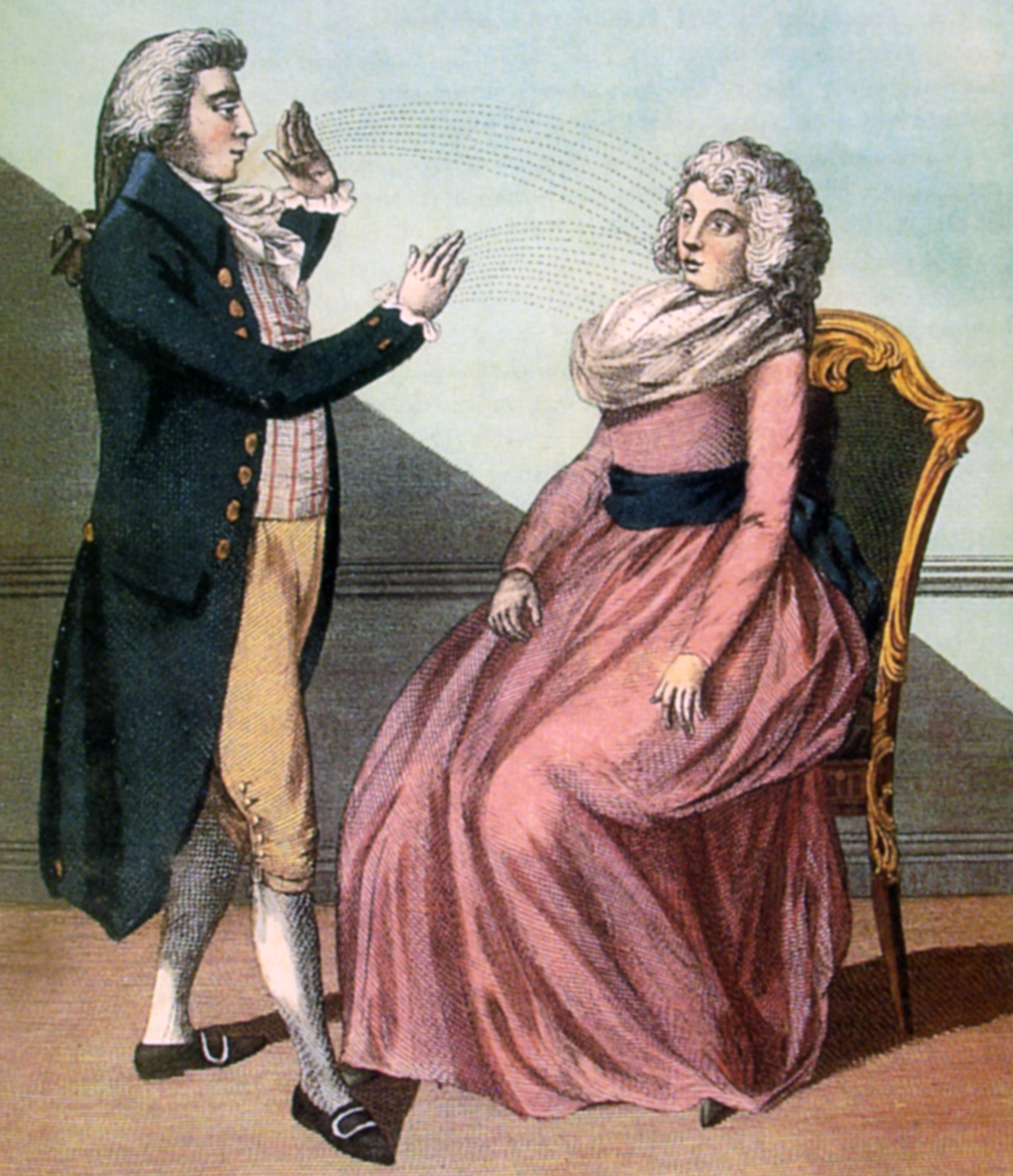
Magnetizer inducing a hypnotic trance (engraving from 1794).

Romantic psychiatry was a medical school of thought that brought together a number of clinicians from the first half of the 19th century around several common theses inspired by the ideas of Romantic philosophers. They are considered precursors of psychodynamics, from which psychoanalysis partly emerged. They all stressed the need to consider each individual case as a specific and unique clinical entity and therefore were suspicious of psychiatric classifications. They also believed that unconscious psychological causes were sufficient to generate serious mental disorders. In the field of therapy, they believed in the effectiveness of psychotherapy for mental illnesses and the need to discover their proper psychological causes (which were most often unconscious).

Franz Mesmer, with his theory of animal magnetism, is recognized as a controversial precursor of this school in that he drew attention to the role of the psyche in the healing of certain diseases and gave apparent scientific credibility to the idea of unity between nature, considered on a cosmic scale, and the mind. Following Mesmer, German psychiatrists or psychologists such as J.C. Reil, J.C.A. Heinroth, K.W.I. Ideler or H.W. Neumann, inspired by the works of Schelling and Schubert, became interested in suggestion – upon which Mesmer's success actually rested – and its effectiveness in healing mental illness. They emphasized the specific role of the psyche in therapy.

== Legacy ==
Romantic psychology has had a lasting impact on modern psychology and continues to influence the field today. Some of the key legacies of Romantic psychology include:

- A focus on subjective experience: Romantic psychology emphasized the importance of the individual's subjective experience and the role of emotions, imagination, and intuition in shaping human behavior. This emphasis on subjectivity has continued to influence modern psychology, leading to the development of humanistic and existential approaches that prioritize the individual's experience and meaning-making.
- The exploration of the unconscious: post-romantic thinkers, such as Carl Jung, saw the unconscious as a vital part of the human psyche and emphasized the importance of exploring it through dreams, fantasy, and creative expression. This focus on the unconscious has continued to influence modern psychology, leading to the development of analytical psychology and depth psychology approaches that aim to uncover the hidden aspects of the psyche.
- The role of culture and context: Romantic psychology recognized that human experience is shaped by cultural and historical context and emphasized the importance of considering these factors in understanding human behavior.

== See also ==
- Romantic medicine
- Romanticism in philosophy
- Romanticism in science
- Romanticism
- German Romanticism
- Analytical psychology
- Naturphilosophie

== Main sources ==
- Béguin, A. (1939). L'âme romantique et le rêve : Essai sur le romantisme allemand et la poésie française. Paris: Librairie José Corti.
- Burwick, F. (2010). Poetic Madness and the Romantic Imagination. Philadelphia: Penn State University Press.
- Ellenberger, H.F. (1970). The Discovery of the Unconscious: The History and Evolution of Dynamic Psychiatry. New York: Basic Books.
- Ffytche, M. (2012). The foundation of the unconscious: Schelling, Freud, and the Birth of the Modern Psyche. Cambridge: University press.
