= Unconscious spirit =

Supposed part of the human spirit that operates outside of conscious awareness

The unconscious spirit is the supposed part of the human spirit or soul that operates outside of conscious awareness.

In general, the idea of the unconscious spirit suggests that there are deeper aspects of our selves that are not readily accessible to conscious awareness, but which may hold important insights, wisdom, and creative potential. It invites us to explore the depths of our inner world and connect with the spiritual dimensions of our being.

This idea has been explored in various spiritual and philosophical traditions throughout history. In some religious traditions, the unconscious spirit may be seen as the source of divine inspiration or guidance.

== Religious traditions ==
=== Western religions ===
In Western religions, the concept of the Holy Spirit in Christianity and the Ruach in Judaism are sometimes seen as corresponding to the idea of the unconscious spirit. Both of these concepts refer to a divine presence or energy that animates the universe and is accessible to human beings through prayer, meditation, and other spiritual practices.

As a promoter of reflective consciousness, Saint Augustine, a theologian of the 5th century and Church Father, is the initiator of an introspective approach which consists in discerning the zones of unconscious from which consciousness itself is born. This discernment is achieved through a deepening of the immediate consciousness, in which the soul directly grasps its concrete reality. For Augustine, our conscious mind and our voluntary action had their common source in an inner and unconscious spiritual reality where God himself resided and which he alone knew in all its extent, and animated.

== Philosophy ==
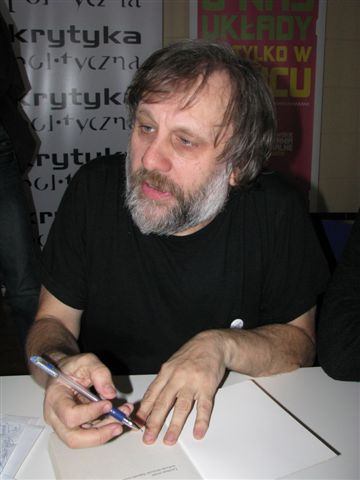
Slavoj Žižek is an example of a contemporary philosopher and psychoanalyst influenced by Schelling's and Hegel's conceptions of the unconscious.

In philosophy, the notion of an unconscious spirit emerged in the course of history in the context of philosophical romanticism and its mystical and neoplatonic sources. The term itself, first used as an adjective in the 18th century, did not really appear in its present noun form until the 19th century. It was coined by the German Romantic philosopher Friedrich Schelling (in his System of Transcendental Idealism), and later introduced into English by the poet and essayist Samuel Taylor Coleridge (in his Biographia Literaria).

=== Schelling and the Romantics ===
Friedrich Schelling was a German philosopher who was a major figure in the development of German Idealism and Romanticism. His understanding of the unconscious was influenced by his belief in the interconnectedness of all things in nature. In his philosophy of nature, he posited that nature itself was an unconscious, spiritual force. Schelling believed that the universe was not simply a collection of inert matter, but rather a dynamic, living entity that was infused with a kind of divine intelligence.

According to Schelling, the unconscious spirit is the underlying force behind all of the phenomena of the natural world, from the movements of the planets to the growth of plants and animals. This spirit is also present within human beings, although in a more conscious form, and is responsible for the development of human consciousness and culture. He sees it as a kind of pre-rational or pre-conscious realm that underlies conscious experience. In that view, the unconscious spirit is the source of creative inspiration and intuition.

Schelling's ideas about the unconscious spirit were highly influential in the development of Romanticism. For the German Romantics in general, the Unconscious (Unbewusste in German) constituted the root or the foundation of the human being, the point of insertion of his spirit in the vast process of the world. The Romantic approach to the "Unconscious" found a posterity even beyond philosophy, in Romantic psychology. It was a decisive moment in the genesis of the psychodynamic notion of the unconscious and helped to shape later psycho-philosophical movements such as depth psychology.

=== Hegel ===
Georg Hegel is one of the most important figures in German idealism and pantheistic postkantian philosophy. While he did not explicitly develop a theory of the unconscious, nor include the unconscious as a central element of his psychology, he acknowledged the unconscious dimension of world spirit. He talked of the unconscious processes of spirit as a "nightlike abyss". For Hegel, the Spirit (Geist) was a developmental process of self-actualization realized individually and collectively through reflective, contemplative thought and action. His notion of Geist encompasses a principle of complexe holism whereby higher stages of development are attained through dynamic, laborious dialectical mediation. The unconscious is seen in that perspective as the competing and antithetical organizations of "impulses" (Triebe) or "instincts", whose "basic is the soul itself", which informs Spirit's burgeoning process over time.

=== Hartmann ===
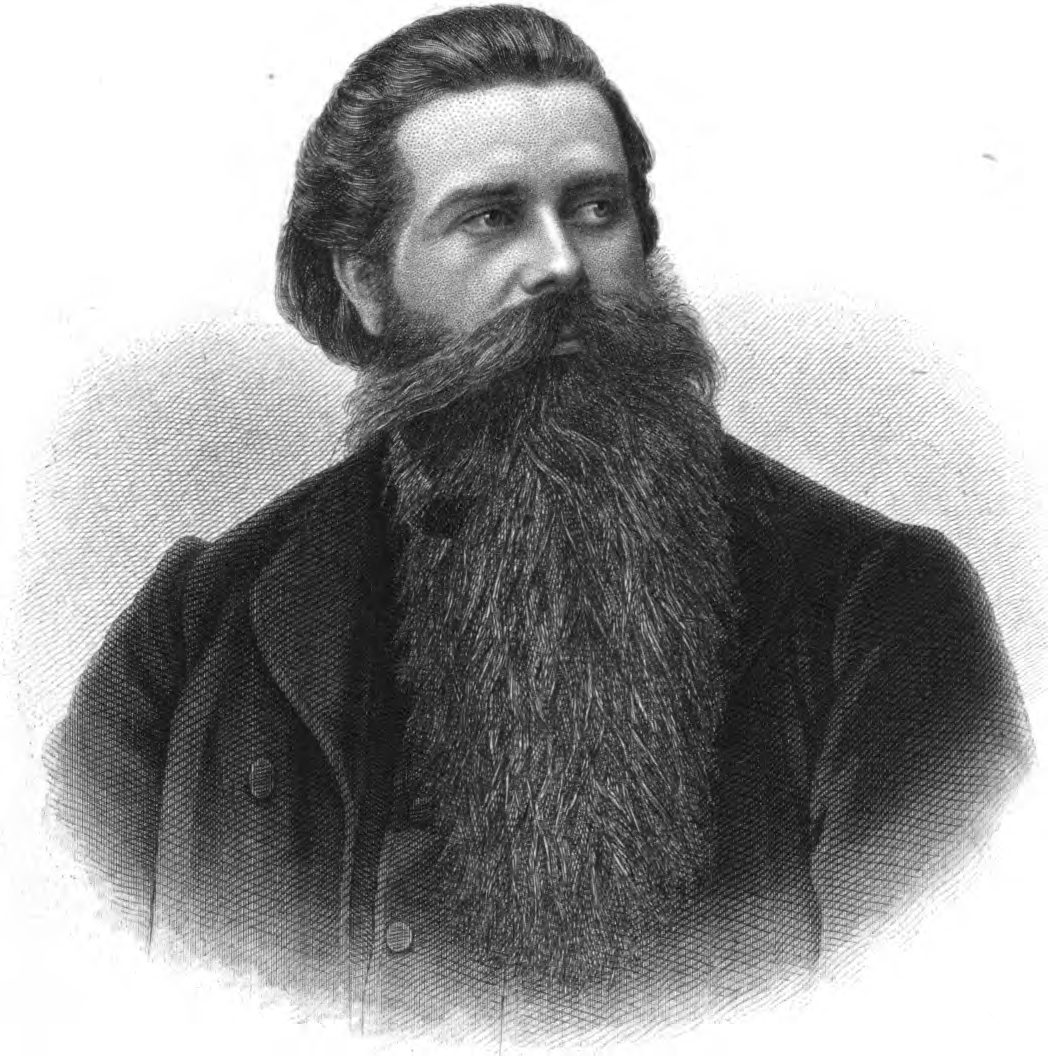
Portrait of Eduard von Hartmann (1882)

Eduard von Hartmann was a German philosopher who lived in the 19th century, and he is best known for his work on metaphysics and the philosophy of religion. In his philosophy, von Hartmann developed the concept of the unconscious spirit, which he believed played a central role in human existence and the world at large. That Unconscious (Unbewusste in German) appears as a combination of the "Idea" of Hegel with the "Will to live" of Schopenhauer. It is a fundamental force that underlies all of reality, including the physical world and human consciousness. It is also a source of creativity and innovation, and it drives the evolution of consciousness and culture through the whole history.

Von Hartmann saw the unconscious spirit as a kind of cosmic Will, which he believed was ultimately striving towards the realization of an ideal state of being. This ideal state, which he called the "Absolute", was characterized by perfect unity, or by pure potentiality, and it represented the ultimate goal of human existence. The whole point of that philosophy of the unconscious was to vindicate the central thesis of his spiritual pantheism: that there is a single intelligent subject throughout all of nature, which acts purposively and intelligently yet subconsciously. That spiritual pantheism was to be the religion of the modern world, the sole alternative to a bankrupt theism and a soulless materialism.

However, von Hartmann also believed that the unconscious spirit could be destructive and irrational at times, leading to suffering and chaos in the world. He argued that the key to overcoming this destructive aspect of the unconscious spirit was through the development of conscious awareness and rational thought, which could help individuals and societies better understand and harness the power of the unconscious.

== See also ==
- Avaita Vedanta
- Collective unconscious
- Monopsychism
- Unconscious mind
- Unus mundus

== Bibliography ==
- Beiser, F.C. (2016). Weltschmerz: Pessimism in German Philosophy, 1860-1900. Oxford: Oxford University Press.
- Crellin, C. (2014). Jung's Theory of Personality: A Modern Reappraisal. London/New York: Routledge.
- Ffytche, M. (2012). The foundation of the unconscioussous: Schelling, Freud, and the Birth of the Modern Psyche. Cambridge: University press.
- McGrath, S.J. (2012). The Dark Ground of Spirit: Schelling and the unconscious. London/New York: Routledge.
- Mills, J. (2002). The Unconscious Abyss: Hegel's Anticipation of Psychoanalysis. Albany (NY): State University of New York Press.
