= Goldhagen =

Goldhagen (Hebrew: גולדהגן) is a surname. Notable people with the surname include:

- Daniel Goldhagen (born 1959), American writer and academic
- Johann Friedrich Gottlieb Goldhagen (1742–1788), German professor, physician and naturalist
- Shari Goldhagen, American writer
