= Pseudophilosophy =

Philosophical idea or system which does not meet an expected set of standards

Pseudophilosophy is a philosophical idea or system which does not meet an expected set of philosophical standards. There is no universally accepted set of standards, but there are similarities and some common ground.

== Definitions ==
According to Christopher Heumann, an 18th-century scholar, pseudo-philosophy has six characteristics, the 6th of which has been considered to diminish the credibility of the first 5:

1. It has a preference for useless speculation.
2. It appeals merely to human authority.
3. It appeals to tradition instead of reason.
4. It syncretises philosophy with superstition.
5. It has a preference for obscure and enigmatic language and symbolism.
6. It is immoral.

According to Michael Oakeshott, pseudo-philosophy "is theorizing that proceeds partly within and partly outside a given mode of inquiry."

Josef Pieper noted that there cannot be a closed system of philosophy, and that any philosophy that claims to have discovered a "cosmic formula" is a pseudo-philosophy. In this he follows Kant, who rejected the postulation of a "highest principle" from which to develop transcendental idealism, calling this pseudo-philosophy and mysticism.

Nicholas Rescher, in The Oxford Companion to Philosophy, described pseudo-philosophy as "deliberations that masquerade as philosophical but are inept, incompetent, deficient in intellectual seriousness, and reflective of an insufficient commitment to the pursuit of truth." Rescher adds that the term is particularly appropriate when applied to "those who use the resources of reason to substantiate the claim that rationality is unachievable in matters of inquiry."

== History ==
The term "pseudo-philosophy" appears to have been coined by Jane Austen.

Ernest Newman, an English music critic and musicologist, who aimed at intellectual objectivity in his style of criticism, in contrast to the more subjective approach of other critics, published in 1897 Pseudo-Philosophy at the End of the Nineteenth Century, a critique of imprecise and subjective writing.

According to Josef Pieper, for Pythagoras, Plato and Aristotle philosophy is the human search "oriented toward wisdom such as God possesses". It suggests that philosophy includes, in its essence, an orientation toward theology. Pieper notes:

Thus something is being expressed here that clearly contradicts what in the modern age has become the accepted notion of philosophy; for this new conception of philosophy assumes that it is the decisive feature of philosophical thought to disentangle itself from theology, faith and tradition.

== Usage ==
The term is almost always used pejoratively and is often contentious, due to differing criteria for demarcating pseudophilosophy (see also: Demarcation problem).

=== Romanticism ===
According to physicist and philosopher of science Mario Bunge,

Pseudophilosophy is nonsense parading as deep philosophy. It may have existed since Lao-Tzu, but it was not taken seriously until about 1800, when the Romantics challenged the Enlightenment. By giving up rationality, they generated a lot of pseudophilosophy...

For Kant, intellectual knowledge is discursive knowledge, not intuitive knowledge. According to Kant, intuition is limited to the realm of senses, while knowledge is "essentially realised in the acts of researching, relating, comparing, differentiating, inferring, proving". Kant criticised Romantic philosophy, which is based on feeling and intuition, and not on "philosophical work":

In philosophy, Kant writes, "the law of reason, of acquiring possessions through work", prevails. And because it is not work, the Romantic philosophy is not genuine philosophy – an objection that is also leveled by Kant against Plato, the "father of all rapturous fantasizing in philosophy", while it is noted, with both approval and assent, that "the philosophy of Aristotle is, by contrast, work".

Kant called Romantic philosophy pseudo-philosophy, "in which one is entitled not to work, but only to heed and enjoy the oracle in oneself in order to take complete possession of that wisdom toward which philosophy aims".

=== Mysticism ===
Mysticism has a long history. In the Age of Enlightenment mysticism had fallen into disrepute. Kant called mysticism pseudophilosophy. In the 19th century, with the rise of Romanticism, interest in mysticism was renewed. Rationalists and Lutherans wrote histories of mysticism to reject its claims, but there was a widespread interest in spiritualism and related phenomena.

Interest in Eckhart's works was revived in the early nineteenth century, especially by German Romantics and Idealist philosophers. Since the 1960s, debate has been going on in Germany whether Eckhart should be called a "mystic". The philosopher Karl Albert had already argued that Eckhart had to be placed in the tradition of philosophical mysticism of Parmenides, Plato, Plotinus, Porphyry, Proclus and other neo-Platonistic thinkers. Heribert Fischer argued, in the 1960s, that Eckhart was a mediaeval theologian.

=== German Idealism ===
Arthur Schopenhauer wrote the following about Georg Wilhelm Friedrich Hegel:

If I were to say that the so-called philosophy of this fellow Hegel is a colossal piece of mystification which will yet provide posterity with an inexhaustible theme for laughter at our times, that it is a pseudophilosophy paralyzing all mental powers, stifling all real thinking, and, by the most outrageous misuse of language, putting in its place the hollowest, most senseless, thoughtless, and, as is confirmed by its success, most stupefying verbiage, I should be quite right.

A hundred and fifty years after Schopenhauer's death, physicist and philosopher of science Mario Bunge recommended "avoiding the pseudo-subtleties of Hegelian dialectics", and wrote of "Hegel's disastrous legacy": "It is true that Marx and Engels criticized Hegel's idealism, but they did not repudiate his cult of nonsense and his rejection of all modern science from Newton on." Bunge noted,

True, Hegel tackled a number of important problems, so his work cannot be dismissed lightly. However, his work, when understandable at all, was usually wrong in the light of the most advanced science of his own time. Worse, it enshrined the equivocation that depth must be obscure.

=== Continental philosophy ===
Soccio notes that analytically inclined philosophers tend to dismiss Heidegger's philosophy as pseudophilosophy. According to Christensen, Heidegger himself called the philosophy of Husserl scheinphilosophy.

=== Scientism ===
Dietrich von Hildebrand used the term to critique the central place modern science is occupying in western society:

This pseudo philosophy, in which science takes the place of metaphysics and religion, more and more corrodes the life of man, making him more and more blind to the real cosmos, in all its plenitude, depth and mystery ... Today we are witnessing a revolt against the deformation expressed in this pseudo philosophy.

=== Objectivism ===
Journalist Jonathan Chait used the term to criticize the work of Ayn Rand in "Ayn Rand's Pseudo-Philosophy", an article in The New Republic, in which he wrote, "She was a true amateur who insisted on seeing herself as the greatest human being who ever lived because she was almost completely unfamiliar with the entire philosophical canon." Physicist and philosopher of science Mario Bunge classified Rand as a "mercenary", among those who "seek to defend or propagate a doctrine rather than an analyzing ideas or searching for new truths", while science writer and skeptic Michael Shermer claimed that "it becomes clear that Objectivism was (and is) a cult, as are many other, non-religious groups". The Stanford Encyclopedia of Philosophy said of Rand, "For all her popularity, however, only a few professional philosophers have taken her work seriously."

== See also ==
- Externism
- Flipism
- Non-philosophy
- Obscurantism
- Pataphysics
- Sophism

== Sources ==
- Adler, Philip J.; Pouwels, Randall Lee (2010), World Civilizations vol. 2: Since 1500: Since 1500, Volume 2, Cengage Learning
- Baur, Michael; Dahlstrom, Daniel O. (1999), The Emergence of German Idealism, CUA Press
- Bunge, Mario (2010), Matter and Mind: A Philosophical Inquiry, Springer
- Bunge, Mario (2012), Evaluating Philosophies, Springer
- Christensen, Bruin Carleton (2008), Self and World: From Analytic Philosophy to Phenomenology, Walter de Gruyter
- Clark, James M. (2013), The Great German Mystics: Eckhart, Tauler and Suso, Dover Publications
- Clarke, John James (1992), In Search of Jung: Historical and Philosophical Enquiries, Routledge
- Fletcher Luther, Sara; Neumaier, John J.; Parsons, Howard Lee (1995), Diverse Perspectives on Marxist Philosophy: East and West, Greenwood Publishing Group
- Hackett, Jeremiah (2012), A Companion to Meister Eckhart, Brill
- Hanegraaf, Wouter (2012), Esotericism and the Academy: Rejected Knowledge in Western Culture, Cambridge University Press
- Honderich, Ted, ed. (1995), The Oxford Companion to Philosophy, Oxford University Press
- Inglis, John (1998), Spheres of Philosophical Inquiry and the Historiography of Medieval Philosophy, BRILL
- Irwin, William; Gracia, Jorge J.E. (2007), Philosophy and the Interpretation of Popular Culture, Rowman & Littlefield
- Johnson, Claudia L.; Tuite, Clara (2011), A Companion to Jane Austen, John Wiley & Sons
- Kearney, Richard; Rainwater, Mara (1996), The Continental Philosophy Reader, Routledge
- Kolinsky, Martin; Paterson, William Edgar (1976), Social and Political Movements in Western Europe, Taylor & Francis
- Kritzman, Lawrence D.; Reilly, Brian J. (2007), The Columbia History Of Twentieth-Century French Thought, Columbia University Press
- Lepenies, Wolf (2009), The Seduction of Culture in German History, Princeton University Press
- McGinn, Bernard (2001), The Mystical Thought of Meister Eckhart, New York: Crossroad Publishing Company
- McGrath, S.J. (2006), The Early Heidegger and Medieval Philosophy: Phenomenology for the Godforsaken, CUA Press
- Nardin, Terry (2001), The Philosophy of Michael Oakeshott, Penn State Press
- Nichols, Aidan (1997), Dominican Gallery: Portrait of a Culture, Gracewing Publishing
- Pieper, Josef (2006), For the Love of Wisdom: Essays on the Nature of Philosophy, Ignatius Press
- Pigliucci, Massimo; Boudry, Maarten (2013), Philosophy of Pseudoscience: Reconsidering the Demarcation Problem, University of Chicago Press, hdl:1854/LU-3161824, ISBN 978-0226051796
- Schopenhauer, Arthur (1965), On the Basis of Morality, Translated by E.F.J.Payne, Indianapolis: Bobbs-Merrill
- Soccio, Douglas J. (2011), Archetypes of Wisdom: An Introduction to Philosophy, 8th ed.: An Introduction to Philosophy, Cengage Learning
- Taylor, Andrew; Kelly, Áine (2013), Stanley Cavell, Literature, and the Idea of America, Routledge
- Tobin, Kenneth G. (2012), The Practice of Constructivism in Science Education, Routledge
- Von Hildebrand, Dietrich (1960), What Is Philosophy?, Taylor & Francis
- Wiener, Jacob (2010), Time of Terror-Road to Revival: One Person's Story: Growing Up in Germany, Negotiating with Nazis, Rebuilding Life in America, Trafford Publishing
