= Heidegger: A (Very) Critical Introduction =

2008 book by Sean J. McGrath

- Cover
- Authors: Sean J. McGrath
- Language: English
- Subject: Martin Heidegger
- Publisher: Eerdmans
- Publication date: 2008
- Publication place: United States
- Media type: Print (Paperback)
- Pages: 144 pp.
- ISBN: 9780802860071

Heidegger: A (Very) Critical Introduction is a 2008 book by Sean J. McGrath, in which the author provides a theological analysis of Martin Heidegger's thought and its relation with his political endeavors.

== Synopsis ==
This book can be said to be an extension of McGrath's previous work The Early Heidegger and Medieval Philosophy. McGrath argues for a clear connection between Heidegger’s Nazi sympathies and his relationship to Christianity.

== Reception ==
Heidegger: A (Very) Critical Introduction was commissioned by the Centre for Theology and Philosophy at the University of Nottingham, the theological think-tank headed by the Anglican theologian John Milbank. It has been reviewed in Notre Dame Philosophical Reviews, Dialog: A Journal of Theology, Religious Studies Review, The Heythrop Journal and Expository Times. John Hughes described the book as "one of the clearest and most elegantly written [accounts of Heidegger] I have come across."
