= Karl Wilhelm Ideler =

German psychiatrist (1795–1860)

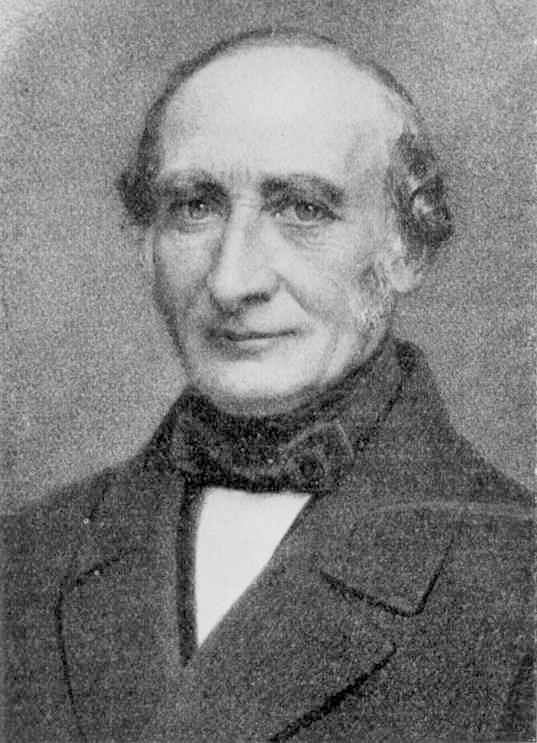
Karl Wilhelm Ideler

Karl Wilhelm Ideler (25 October 1795 – 29 July 1860) was a German psychiatrist. He was born in Bentwisch and died in Kumlosen near Wittenberge.

== Life and career ==
In 1820, he earned his doctorate from the Friedrich Wilhelm Institute in Berlin, and spent the next several years as a general practitioner in the cities of Bernau, Rathenow and Genthin. In 1828, he returned to Berlin as head of the department for mental illness at the Charité. In 1840, he became a full professor and director of the psychiatric clinic. From 1839 until his death in 1860, he taught classes at the University of Berlin. His uncle was noted astronomer Christian Ludwig Ideler (1766–1846).

Ideler was one of the more prominent figures in regards to German psychiatric thought during the first half of the 19th century. This era is often described as the German "romantic" school of psychiatry. In his numerous publications, Ideler theorized on issues such as mind–body correlations, religious mania and religious confusion. Ideler introduced complex theories on the relationship between illnesses of the mind and the state of the physical body.

During his time period, conditions at the Charité for mentally ill patients were often considered barbaric and inhumane. Ideler, not averse to punitive measures, made little effort to change these conditions. Later on, Wilhelm Griesinger (1817–1868) would advocate significant changes towards humane and dignified treatment of the mentally ill at the Charité. Although Ideler is often portrayed as a product of an unenlightened era in psychiatric thought, he had several ideas that are consistent with modern psychoanalysis. He stressed the importance of the emotional life, and believed that unfulfilled passions could be a source of mental disturbance. He considered passion to be a form of mental disturbance, and that the physician needed to analyze the passion that provoked the mental imbalance.

== Selected writings ==
- Anthropologie für Ärzte (Anthropology for physicians), (1827)
- Grundriss der Seelenheilkunde (Outline of "soul treatment"), (1835)
- Biographien Geisteskranker in ihrer psychologischen Entwicklung (1841)
- Die Geisteskrankheiten in Beziehung zur Rechtspflege (Mental disorders in relationship with justice), (1844)
- Der religiöse Wahnsinn, erläutert durch Krankengeschichten. Ein Beitrag zur Geschichte der religiösen Wirren der Gegenwart (Religious insanity, description of patient stories. A contribution to the history of religious confusion of the present), (1847)
- Aversuch einer Theorie des religiösen Wahnsinns: ein Beitrag zur Kritik der religiösen Wirren der Gegenwart (Theorical attempt involving religious insanity: Contribution in regards to criticism of religious confusion of the present):
  - 1. Die Erscheinungen des religiösen Wahnsinns (The features of religious insanity), (1848)
  - 2. Die Entwickelung des religiösen Wahnsinns (The development of religious insanity), (1850).
