= Psychology from an Empirical Standpoint =

1874 book by Franz Brentano

- Title page of the first edition
- Author: Franz Brentano
- Original title: Psychologie vom empirischen Standpunkte
- Translators: Antos C. Rancurello, D. B. Terrell, Linda L. McAlister
- Language: German
- Subject: Psychology
- Published: 1874 (Duncker & Humblot, in German); 1924 (Philosophische Biblothek, in German); 1973 (Routledge & Kegan Paul, in English)
- Publication place: Germany
- Media type: Print (Hardcover and Paperback)
- Pages: 350 (first edition); 415 (2005 Routledge edition)
- ISBN: 978-1138019171

Psychology from an Empirical Standpoint (German: Psychologie vom empirischen Standpunkte; 1874; second edition 1924) is an 1874 book by the Austrian philosopher Franz Brentano, in which the author argues that the goal of psychology should be to establish exact laws. Brentano's best known book, it established his reputation as a philosopher, helped to establish psychology as a scientific discipline, and influenced Husserlian phenomenology, analytic philosophy, gestalt psychology, and the philosopher Alexius Meinong's theory of objects. It has been called Brentano's best known work and has been compared to the physician Wilhelm Wundt's Grundzüge der physiologischen Psychologie and the Project for a Scientific Psychology of Sigmund Freud, the founder of psychoanalysis.

== Summary ==
Discussing the philosopher Eduard von Hartmann's Philosophy of the Unconscious (1869), Brentano comments that Hartmann "uses the term 'consciousness' to refer to something different from what we do. He defines consciousness as 'the emancipation of the idea from the will...and the opposition of the will to this emancipation,' and as 'the bewilderment of the will over the existence of the idea, which existence the will does not want but which, nevertheless, is sensibly present.' Brentano suggests that Hartmann's definition of consciousness perhaps refers to "something purely imaginary", and certainly does not agree with Brentano's definition.

== Background and publication history ==
Brentano was at work on Psychology from an Empirical Standpoint in 1873, while travelling in Europe after leaving the Roman Catholic Church and resigning from his position at the University of Würzburg. He completed the first two books of the work in March 1874. Brentano originally intended to produce a large work consisting of six books, the first five of which would cover psychology as a science, mental phenomena in general, and their three basic classes, while the sixth would deal with the mind-body problem, the soul, and immortality. However, Brentano was ill with smallpox after publishing the first two books. The work remained incomplete. In 1911, Brentano published book two of Psychology from an Empirical Standpoint under the new title Von der Klassifikation der psychischen Phänomene, with the addition of remarks explaining his later views, where they differed from those he held in 1874.

Psychology from an Empirical Standpoint was first published as Psychologie vom empirischen Standpunkte, but subsequent editions were published as Psychologie vom empirischen Standpunkt, which is the more commonly cited name. The first edition was designated Volume 1, but this was also abandoned in later editions. In 1924, after Brentano's death, the book was published in a new edition, which included explanatory notes by the philosopher Oskar Kraus.

== Reception ==
Psychology from an Empirical Standpoint is Brentano's best-known book, and much has been written about its "intentionality passage". Brentano reintroduced the concept of intentionality into the philosophy of mind. However, the philosopher Roger Scruton describes the intentionality passage of Psychology from an Empirical Standpoint as both obscure and hesitant. Scruton believes that the obscurity of the passage is "compounded by Brentano's description of intentionality as the mark which distinguishes mental phenomena from physical phenomena, the latter being described, not as objective features of the natural world, but as appearances." According to Scruton, while in later editions of Psychology from an Empirical Standpoint Brentano described intentionality as a property of mental activity, and characterized it as a kind of "mental reference", Brentano never makes clear precisely what kind of property he believes it to be anywhere in his writings. Scruton has commented that none of the volumes of Psychology from an Empirical Standpoint "fulfil the promise made in the book's title", adding that Brentano eventually came to doubt that an empirical science of the mental is likely to be invented.

Psychology from an Empirical Standpoint has been compared to Sigmund Freud's early metapsychology, especially as expressed in his Project for a Scientific Psychology. The psychologist Paul Vitz, who calls Psychology from an Empirical Standpoint Brentano's greatest work, notes that while Brentano rejected the unconscious, "his answer followed largely from his definitions of consciousness and unconsciousness, and the evidence subsequently available to Freud did not, of course, figure in Brentano's thought."

The philosopher Clark Glymour writes that Psychology from an Empirical Standpoint "gave Freud one vision of what psychology should seek to know, and of what methods it should use." According to Glymour, Brentano believed that "psychology should have exact laws, and that the goal of psychology should be to find such laws...Brentano held that there are exact laws that refer only to the mental, and do not need to appeal to physical circumstances." In Glymour's view, while Psychology from an Empirical Standpoint "contains lively criticism", Brentano nevertheless "had no laws of any interest to propose" and when Brentano tries to produce results from his method "the product is deadly dull and nearly vacuous." Glymour considers Brentano's efforts "lame" in comparison to the work of the physician Carl Wernicke, who produced a new analysis of the capacity for language.

The philosopher Barry Smith writes that Brentano's thesis about intentionality has "proved to be one of the most influential in all of contemporary philosophy. It gave rise to Husserlian phenomenology, but it also lies at the root of much of the thinking of analytic philosophers on meaning and reference and on the relations of language and mind. In addition, the notion of intentionality, and Brentano's use of this notion as a criterion for the demarcation of the psychological realm, pervades much contemporary philosophizing within the realm of cognitive science."

According to the philosopher Peter Simons, Psychology from an Empirical Standpoint "forged Franz Brentano's reputation and it remains his most important and influential single work...it helped to establish psychology as a scientific discipline in its own right. Through Brentano's illustrious circle of students it exerted a wide influence on philosophy and psychology, especially in Austria, Germany, Poland, and Italy." Simons compares the influence of Brentano's work to that of Wilhelm Wundt's Grundzüge der physiologischen Psychologie, also published in 1874. Simons lists gestalt psychology and Alexius Meinong's theory of objects as additional developments related to Brentano's work, noting that "The course of the Psychology's influence has yet to be fully run." Simons comments that Kraus's notes on Psychology from an Empirical Standpoint "are frequently shrill and intrusive." Simons writes that while passages in chapter one "clearly accord mental phenomena an epistemological advantage over physical phenomena", Kraus "cannot forbear intervening several times to explain how Brentano expresses himself misleadingly, how this conflicts with other things he says elsewhere, and so on." Simons believes that the purpose of Kraus's notes is to harmonize Brentano's views in Psychology from an Empirical Standpoint with views he adopted subsequently.
