= Unconscious mind =

Mental processes not available to introspection

In psychoanalysis and other psychological theories, the unconscious mind (or the unconscious) is the part of the psyche that is not available to introspection. Although these processes exist beneath the surface of conscious awareness, they are thought to exert an effect on conscious thought processes and behavior. The term was coined by the 18th-century German Romantic philosopher Friedrich Schelling and later introduced into English by the poet and essayist Samuel Taylor Coleridge.

The emergence of the concept of the unconscious in psychology and general culture was mainly due to the work of Austrian neurologist and psychoanalyst Sigmund Freud. In psychoanalytic theory, the unconscious mind consists of ideas and drives that have been subject to the mechanism of repression: anxiety-producing impulses in childhood are barred from consciousness, but do not cease to exist, and exert a constant pressure in the direction of consciousness. However, the content of the unconscious is only knowable to consciousness through its representation in a disguised or distorted form, by way of dreams and neurotic symptoms, as well as in slips of the tongue and jokes. The psychoanalyst seeks to interpret these conscious manifestations in order to understand the nature of the repressed.

The unconscious mind can be seen as the source of dreams and automatic thoughts (those that appear without any apparent cause), the repository of forgotten memories (that may still be accessible to consciousness at some later time), and the locus of implicit knowledge (the things that we have learned so well that we do them without thinking). Phenomena related to semi-consciousness include awakening, implicit memory, subliminal messages, trances, hypnagogia and hypnosis. While sleep, sleepwalking, dreaming, delirium and comas may signal the presence of unconscious processes, these processes are seen as symptoms rather than the unconscious mind itself.

Some critics have doubted the existence of the unconscious altogether.

== Historical overview ==
=== German ===
The term "unconscious" (German: unbewusst) was coined by the 18th-century German Romantic philosopher Friedrich Schelling (in his System of Transcendental Idealism, ch. 6, § 3) and later introduced into English by the poet and essayist Samuel Taylor Coleridge (in his Biographia Literaria). Some rare earlier instances of the term "unconsciousness" (Unbewußtseyn) can be found in the work of the 18th-century German physician and philosopher Ernst Platner.

=== Vedas ===
Influences on thinking that originate from outside an individual's consciousness were reflected in the ancient ideas of temptation, divine inspiration, and the predominant role of the gods in affecting motives and actions. The idea of internalised unconscious processes in the mind was present in antiquity, and has been explored across a wide variety of cultures. Unconscious aspects of mentality were referred to between 2,500 and 600 BC in the Hindu texts known as the Vedas, found today in Ayurvedic medicine.

=== Paracelsus ===
Paracelsus is credited as the first to make mention of an unconscious aspect of cognition in his work Von den Krankheiten (translates as "About illnesses", 1567), and his clinical methodology created a cogent system that is regarded by some as the beginning of modern scientific psychology.

=== Shakespeare ===
William Shakespeare explored the role of the unconscious in many of his plays, without naming it as such.

=== Philosophy ===
In his work Anthropology from a Pragmatic Point of View, philosopher Immanuel Kant was one of the first to discuss the subject of unconscious ideas.

Western philosophers such as Arthur Schopenhauer, Baruch Spinoza, Gottfried Wilhelm Leibniz, Johann Gottlieb Fichte, Georg Wilhelm Friedrich Hegel, Karl Robert Eduard von Hartmann, Carl Gustav Carus, Søren Aabye Kierkegaard, Friedrich Wilhelm Nietzsche and Thomas Carlyle used the word unconscious.

In 1880 at the University of Paris, Edmond Colsenet defended a philosophy thesis (PhD) on the unconscious. Élie Rabier and Alfred Fouillée performed syntheses of the unconscious "at a time when Freud was not interested in the concept".

== Psychology ==
=== Nineteenth century ===
According to historian of psychology Mark Altschule, "It is difficult—or perhaps impossible—to find a nineteenth-century psychologist or psychiatrist who did not recognize unconscious cerebration as not only real but of the highest importance." In 1890, when psychoanalysis was still unheard of, William James, in his monumental treatise on psychology (The Principles of Psychology), examined the way Schopenhauer, von Hartmann, Janet, Binet and others had used the term 'unconscious' and 'subconscious.'" German psychologists, Gustav Fechner and Wilhelm Wundt, had begun to use the term in their experimental psychology, in the context of manifold, jumbled sense data that the mind organizes at an unconscious level before revealing it as a cogent totality in conscious form." Eduard von Hartmann published a book dedicated to the topic, Philosophy of the Unconscious, in 1869.

=== Freud ===
The iceberg metaphor proposed by G. T. Fechner is often used to provide a visual representation of Freud's theory that most of the human mind operates unconsciously.

Sigmund Freud and his followers developed an account of the unconscious mind. He worked with the unconscious mind to develop an explanation for mental illness.

For Freud, the unconscious is not merely that which is not conscious. He refers to that as the descriptive unconscious and it is only the starting postulate for real investigation into the psyche. He further distinguishes the unconscious from the pre-conscious: the pre-conscious is merely latent – thoughts, memories, etc. that are not present to consciousness but are capable of becoming so; the unconscious consists of psychic material that is made completely inaccessible to consciousness by the act of repression. The distinctions and inter-relationships between these three regions of the psyche—the conscious, the pre-conscious, and the unconscious—form what Freud calls the topographical model of the psyche. He later sought to respond to the perceived ambiguity of the term "unconscious" by developing what he called the structural model of the psyche, in which unconscious processes were described in terms of the id and the superego in their relation to the ego.

In the psychoanalytic view, unconscious mental processes can only be recognized through analysis of their effects in consciousness. Unconscious thoughts are not directly accessible to ordinary introspection, but they are capable of partially evading the censorship mechanism of repression in a disguised form, manifesting, for example, as dream elements or neurotic symptoms. Such symptoms are supposed to be capable of being "interpreted" during psychoanalysis, with the help of methods such as free association, dream analysis, and analysis of verbal slips and other unintentional manifestations in conscious life.

=== Jung ===
Carl Gustav Jung agreed with Freud that the unconscious is a determinant of personality, but he proposed that the unconscious be divided into two layers: the personal unconscious and the collective unconscious. The personal unconscious is a reservoir of material that was once conscious but has been forgotten or suppressed, much like Freud's notion. The collective unconscious, however, is the deepest level of the psyche, containing the accumulation of inherited psychic structures and archetypal experiences. Archetypes are not memories but energy centers or psychological functions that are apparent in the culture's use of symbols. The collective unconscious is therefore said to be inherited and to contain material of an entire species rather than of an individual. The collective unconscious is, according to Jung, "[the] whole spiritual heritage of mankind's evolution, born anew in the brain structure of every individual".

In addition to the structure of the unconscious, Jung differed from Freud in that he did not believe that sexuality was at the base of all unconscious thoughts.

== Dreams ==
=== Freud ===
The purpose of dreams, according to Freud, is to fulfill repressed wishes while simultaneously allowing the dreamer to remain asleep. The dream is a disguised fulfillment of the wish because the unconscious desire in its raw form would disturb the sleeper and can only avoid censorship by associating itself with elements that are not subject to repression. Thus, Freud distinguished between the manifest content and latent content of the dream. The manifest content consists of the plot and elements of a dream as they appear to consciousness, particularly upon waking, as the dream is recalled. The latent content refers to the hidden or disguised meaning of the events and elements of the dream. It represents the unconscious psychic realities of the dreamer's current issues and childhood conflicts, the nature of which the analyst is seeking to understand through interpretation of the manifest content.

In Freud's theory, dreams are instigated by the events and thoughts of everyday life. In what he called the "dream-work", these events and thoughts, governed by the rules of language and the reality principle, become subject to the "primary process" of unconscious thought, which is governed by the pleasure principle, wish gratification, and the repressed sexual scenarios of childhood. The dream-work involves disguising these unconscious desires to preserve sleep. This process occurs primarily by means of what Freud called condensation and displacement. Condensation is the focusing of the energy of several ideas into one, and displacement is the surrender of one idea's energy to another, more trivial representative. The manifest content is thus thought to be a highly significant simplification of the latent content, capable of being deciphered in the analytic process, potentially allowing conscious insight into unconscious mental activity.

=== Neurobiological theory of dreams ===
Allan Hobson and colleagues developed what they called the activation-synthesis hypothesis, which proposes that dreams are simply the side effects of the neural activity in the brain that produces beta brain waves during REM sleep, which are associated with wakefulness. According to this hypothesis, neurons fire periodically during sleep in the lower brain levels and thus send random signals to the cortex. The cortex then synthesizes a dream in response to these signals, trying to make sense of why the brain is sending them. However, the hypothesis does not state that dreams are meaningless; it just downplays the role that emotional factors play in determining dreams.

== Contemporary cognitive psychology ==
=== Research ===
There is an extensive body of research in contemporary cognitive psychology devoted to mental activity that is not mediated by conscious awareness. Most of this research on unconscious processes has been done in the academic tradition of the information processing paradigm. The cognitive tradition of research into unconscious processes does not rely on the clinical observations and theoretical bases of the psychoanalytic tradition; instead it is mostly data driven. Cognitive research reveals that individuals automatically register and acquire more information than they are consciously aware of or can consciously remember and report.

Much research has focused on the differences between conscious and unconscious perception. There is evidence that whether something is consciously perceived depends both on the incoming stimulus (bottom up strength) and on top-down mechanisms like attention. Recent research indicates that some unconsciously perceived information can become consciously accessible if there is cumulative evidence. Similarly, content that would normally be conscious can become unconscious through inattention (e.g. in the attentional blink) or through distracting stimuli like visual masking.

=== Unconscious processing of information about frequency ===
An extensive line of research conducted by Hasher and Zacks has demonstrated that individuals register information about the frequency of events automatically (outside conscious awareness and without engaging conscious information processing resources). Moreover, perceivers do this unintentionally, truly "automatically", regardless of the instructions they receive, and regardless of the information processing goals they have. The ability to unconsciously and relatively accurately tally the frequency of events appears to have little or no relation to the individual's age, education, intelligence, or personality. Thus it may represent one of the fundamental building blocks of human orientation in the environment and possibly the acquisition of procedural knowledge and experience, in general.

== Criticism of the Freudian concept ==
The notion that the unconscious mind exists at all has been disputed.

Franz Brentano rejected the concept of the unconscious in his 1874 book Psychology from an Empirical Standpoint, although his rejection followed largely from his definitions of consciousness and unconsciousness.

Jean-Paul Sartre offers a critique of Freud's theory of the unconscious in Being and Nothingness, based on the claim that consciousness is essentially self-conscious. Sartre also argues that Freud's theory of repression is internally flawed. Philosopher Thomas Baldwin argues that Sartre's argument is based on a misunderstanding of Freud.

Erich Fromm contends that "The term 'the unconscious' is actually a mystification (even though one might use it for reasons of convenience, as I am guilty of doing in these pages). There is no such thing as the unconscious; there are only experiences of which we are aware, and others of which we are not aware, that is, of which we are unconscious. If I hate a man because I am afraid of him, and if I am aware of my hate but not of my fear, we may say that my hate is conscious and that my fear is unconscious; still my fear does not lie in that mysterious place: 'the' unconscious."

John Searle has offered a critique of the Freudian unconscious. He argues that the Freudian cases of shallow, consciously held mental states would be best characterized as 'repressed consciousness,' while the idea of more deeply unconscious mental states is more problematic. He contends that the very notion of a collection of "thoughts" that exist in a privileged region of the mind such that they are in principle never accessible to conscious awareness, is incoherent. This is not to imply that there are not "nonconscious" processes that form the basis of much of conscious life. Rather, Searle simply claims that to posit the existence of something that is like a "thought" in every way except for the fact that no one can ever be aware of it (can never, indeed, "think" it) is an incoherent concept. To speak of "something" as a "thought" either implies that it is being thought by a thinker or that it could be thought by a thinker. Processes that are not causally related to the phenomenon called thinking are more appropriately called the nonconscious processes of the brain.

Other critics of the Freudian unconscious include David Stannard, Richard Webster, Ethan Watters, Richard Ofshe, and Eric Thomas Weber.

Some scientific researchers proposed the existence of unconscious mechanisms that are very different from the Freudian ones. They speak of a "cognitive unconscious" (John Kihlstrom), an "adaptive unconscious" (Timothy Wilson), or a "dumb unconscious" (Loftus and Klinger), which executes automatic processes but lacks the complex mechanisms of repression and symbolic return of the repressed, and the "deep unconscious system" of Robert Langs.

In modern cognitive psychology, many researchers have sought to strip the notion of the unconscious from its Freudian heritage, and alternative terms such as "implicit" or "automatic" have been used. These traditions emphasize the degree to which cognitive processing happens outside the scope of cognitive awareness, and show that things we are unaware of can nonetheless influence other cognitive processes as well as behavior. Active research traditions related to the unconscious include implicit memory (for example, priming), and Pawel Lewicki's nonconscious acquisition of knowledge.

== See also ==
- Adaptive unconscious – Psychological theory
- Autosuggestion – Psychological technique related to the placebo effect
- Consciousness – Awareness of internal and external existence
- Dreams in analytical psychology
- Mass psychogenic illness – Spread of illness without organic cause
- Philosophy of mind – Branch of philosophy
- Preconscious – Concept in psychoanalysis
- Subconscious – Part of the mind that is not currently of focal awareness
- Theory of mind – Ability to attribute mental states to oneself and others
- Unconscious cognition – Mental processing without awareness
- Unconscious communication – Unconscious verbal and nonverbal cues
- Unconscious spirit – Supposed part of the human spirit that operates outside of conscious awareness
