= Gotthilf Heinrich von Schubert =

German scientist

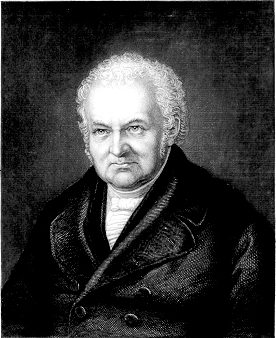
Gotthilf Heinrich von Schubert

Gotthilf Heinrich von Schubert (26 April 1780, in Hohenstein-Ernstthal – 30 June 1860, in Laufzorn, a village in Oberhaching) was a German physician, naturalist and psychologist. From 1819 he worked as a professor of natural history at the University of Erlangen. He wrote several illustrated textbooks on natural history and also on religious topics.

== Life and work ==
The son of Christian Gottlob Schubert (1732-1805), a pastor and Magdalene Werner (1741–1811), he was born in a family of priests. He went to school in Hohenstein, Lichtenstein, Greiz and in Weimar where he met Johann Gottfried Herder (1744–1803), father of his school friend Emil Herder (1783–1855). This made him choose studies in theology at Leipzig (1799) and Jena (1801), but turned to medicine. He studied under Johann Wilhelm Ritter and Friedrich Wilhelm Joseph Schelling (1775–1854) and also interacted with Friedrich August Köthe (1781–1850), Friedrich Gottlob Wetzel (1779–1819). He wrote his doctoral dissertation on galvanic therapy for congenital deafness in 1803. He planned to travel to Africa but after meeting a friend of his sister Henriette Martin from Bärenwalde, he married her and established himself as a doctor in Altenburg, Saxe-Gotha-Altenburg. He soon gave up his practice however and devoted himself to research in Dresden (from 1806). Here he met Adam Müller and Heinrich von Kleist. In 1809, by way of mediation from Friedrich Wilhelm Joseph Schelling, he received the post of rector at a secondary school in Nuremberg. He then turned to Pietist studies and began to study mystic texts along with Franz von Baader.

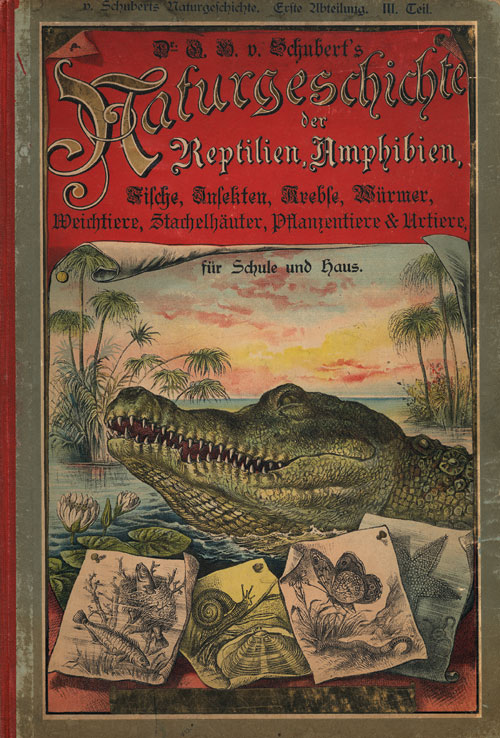
Schubert's "Naturgeschichte der Reptilien, Amphibien, Fische ... Zum Anschauungs-Unterricht für die Jugend". 10th edition, 1890).

He gave renowned lectures on fringe science including animal magnetism, clairvoyance, and dream. In 1819 he occupied the chair in natural history in Erlangen where he studied botany (botanical abbreviation: Schub.), forestry, mineralogy, and geognosy. In 1824 Carl Friedrich Philipp von Martius named the plant genus Schubertia (family Apocynaceae) in his honor. In 1827 he moved for the last time, to Munich, where he was appointed professor of natural history. In Munich the highly popular and friendly Schubert found an embittered opponent in Lorenz Oken. He retired in 1853 and went to live with his son-in-law in Gut Laufzorn.

== Religiously-grounded theory ==
Schubert aimed to create a religiously-grounded interpretation of the cosmos. Contemporaries that included Johann Wolfgang von Goethe, Jean Paul, Justinus Kerner, and Heinrich von Kleist were favorable to his work. His masterpiece, Symbolism of Dreams (1814) was one of the most famous books of its time, exercising influence over E. T. A. Hoffmann, and later on, Sigmund Freud and C. G. Jung. Schubert advocated an ecumenical "awakened Christianity" which found evidence for God both in Nature and in the human soul. Synthesising the Bible with the philosophy of Schelling, he was a major figure in the "later Enlightenment". In his History of the Soul (1830), Schubert again attempted to fuse the philosophy of Herder and Schelling with the Christian tradition.

== Selected works ==
- Die Kirche und die Götter. Roman. 2 volumes. 1804 – The Church and the Gods.
- Ansichten von der Nachtseite der Naturwissenschaft. Arnold, Dresden 1808 – Views from the Dark Side of Science.
- Handbuch der Naturkunde. 2 volumes. Schrag, Nürnberg 1813 (Vol 1: Handbuch der Mineralogie, Vol 2: Handbuch der Geognosie und der Bergkunde) – Handbook of natural history.
- Die Symbolik des Traumes. Kunz, Bamberg 1814 – Symbolism of dreams.
- Altes und Neues aus dem Gebiet der innren Seelenkunde, 5 volumes 1817–44 – Old and new in the field of inner psychology.
- Reise durch das südliche Frankreich und Italien. 2 volumes Palm and Enke, Erlangen 1827–1831 – Journey through southern France and Italy.
- Die Geschichte der Seele, 2 volumes. Cotta, Stuttgart 1830; – History of the soul.
- Biographieen und Erzählungen. 4 volumes in 3 tomes. Heyder, Erlangen 1847–1848 – Biographies and stories.
- Der Erwerb aus einem vergangenen und die Erwartungen von einem zukünftigen Leben. Eine Selbstbiographie. 5 volumes. Palm und Enke, Erlangen 1854–1856 – The acquisition of a past and the expectations of a future life. An autobiography.
- Naturgeschichte des Tier-, Pflanzen- und Mineralreichs. Schreiber, Esslingen und München (8th edition, 1886) – Natural history of the animal, vegetable and mineral kingdom.
