= Johann Christoph Hoffbauer =

German philosopher

Johann Christoph Hoffbauer (19 May 1766, Bielefeld – 4 August 1827, Halle an der Saale) was a German philosopher, who published extensively on natural law, ethics and psychology.

From 1785 he studied at the University of Halle, where his influences included the anti-Kantian philosopher Johann Augustus Eberhard. In 1794 he became an associate professor, and in 1799 a full professor of philosophy at Halle.

== Published works ==
- Tentamina semiologica, sive, Quaedam generalem theoriam signorum spectantia; translated from Latin by Robert E Innis and published as "Semiological investigations, or, Topics pertaining to the general theory of signs" (1991).
- Analytik der Urtheile und Schlüsse mit Anmerkungen meistens erläuternden Inhalts, 1792 – Analysis of judgments and conclusions.
- Naturrecht aus dem Begriffe des Rechts entwickelt, 1793 – Natural law from the terms of the developed law.
- Anfangsgründe der Logik, 1794 – Rudiments of logic.
- Untersuchungen über die wichtigsten Gegenstände des Naturrechts, 1795 – Studies on the most important objects of natural law.
- Anfangsgründe der Moralphilosophie und insbesondere der Sittenlehre nebst einer allgemeinen Geschichte derselben, 1798 – Rudiments of moral philosophy, etc.
- Untersuchungen über die wichtigsten Gegenstände der Moralphilosophie insbesondere der Sittenlehre und Moraltheologie, 1799 – Studies on the most important subjects of moral philosophy, in particular, ethics and moral theology.
- Untersuchungen über die Krankheiten der Seele und die verwandten Zustände, 1802 – Studies on the diseases of the soul.
- Geschichte Der Universität Zu Halle Bis Zum Jahre 1805, (1805) – History of the university to Halle up until the year 1805.
- Die Psychologie in ihren Hauptanwendungen auf die Rechtspflege nach den allgemeinen Gesichtspunkten der Gesetzgebung, (1808, 2nd edition 1823) – Psychology in its main applications to the administration of justice in accordance with the general terms of legislation (translated into French by Antoine-Marie Chambeyron in 1827 and published as "Médecine légale relative aux aliénés et aux sourds-muets; ou, Les lois appliquées aux désordres de l'intelligence"; with notes by Jean-Étienne Dominique Esquirol and Jean Marc Gaspard Itard).
- Versuch über die sicherste und leichteste Anwendung der Analysis in den philosophischen Wissenschaften, 1810 – An essay on the safest and easiest application of analysis for the philosophical sciences.
- Untersuchung über die Natur und den Ursprung der Geistes-Zerrüttung, (1810) a translation of Alexander Crichton's "An inquiry into the nature and origin of mental derangement".
- Das allgemeine oder Natur-Recht und die Moral in ihrer gegenseitigen Abhängigkeit und Unabhängigkeit von einander dargestellt, 1816 – The general or natural law and morals in their interdependence and independence from each other.
- Beyträge zur Beförderung einer Kurmethode auf psychischem Wege; 2 volumes, 1808-1812 (with Johann Christian Reil) – Contributions to encouraging a method of treatment using psychic approaches.
