= Johann Christian Reil =

German physician (1759–1813)

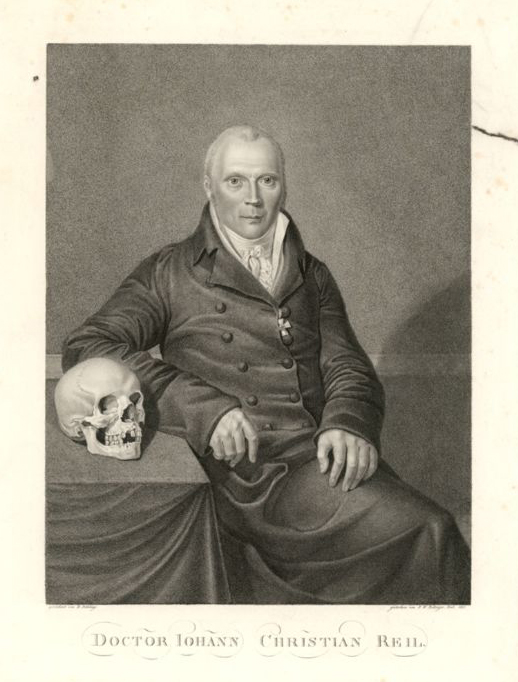
- Reil the anatomist: a portrait from 1811
- Born: 20 February 1759; Rhaude, Rhauderfehn, Kingdom of Prussia, Holy Roman Empire
- Died: 22 November 1813 (aged 54); Halle an der Saale, Kingdom of Prussia
- Scientific career
- Fields: physics physiology anatomy psychiatry
- Institutions: University of Halle; Humboldt University of Berlin

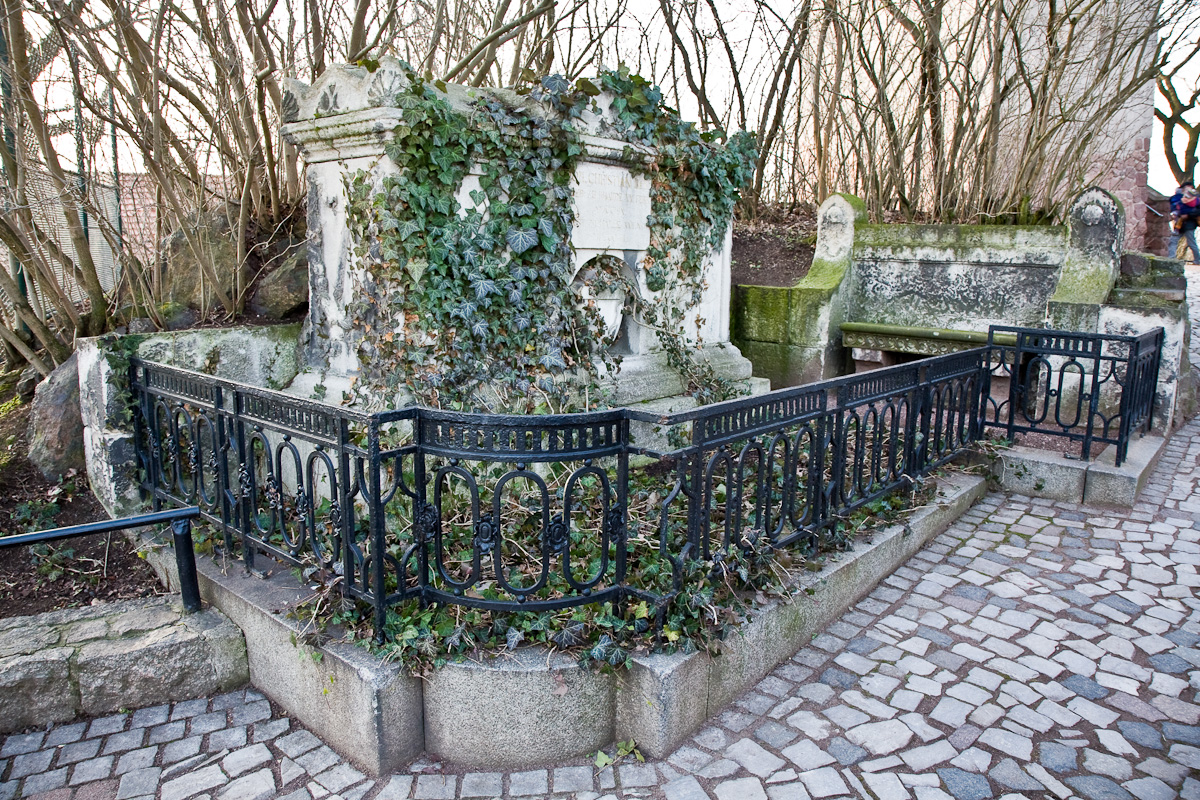
Reil's tomb on the Reilberg in Halle (Saale), Germany, today Bergzoo Halle

Johann Christian Reil (20 February 1759 – 22 November 1813) was a German physician, physiologist, anatomist, and psychiatrist. He coined the term psychiatry – Psychiatrie in German – in 1808.

Reil was one of five children, and was the son of a Lutheran pastor in Northwest Germany. He married Johanna Wilhelmine Leveaux in October, 1788. Together they had two sons and four daughters.

Medical conditions and anatomical features named after him include Reil's finger (later called digitus mortuus or Raynaud syndrome) and the Islands of Reil in the cerebral cortex. In 1809, he was the first to describe the white fibre tract now called the arcuate fasciculus. He is frequently and erroneously credited with discovering the locus coeruleus, which was first described by Félix Vicq-d'Azyr.

Between 1779 and 1780, Reil became acquainted with the scientist Johann Friedrich Blumenbach while Reil was studying medicine in Göttingen. From 1788 to 1810, Reil worked in a hospital in Halle, Germany. He was a student of Johann Friedrich Gottlieb Goldhagen who had founded an outpatient clinic called the Schola clinica. In 1787 he became extraordinary professor of medicine at the University of Halle and after Goldhagen’s death he became head of the Schola clinica. There he developed a medical program based heavily on Friedrich Schelling's Naturphilosophie. In 1795, Reil established the first journal of physiology written in German, the Archiv für die Physiologie. In 1810, he became one of the first professors of psychiatry after being appointed professor of medicine in Berlin.

From 1802 to 1805, the poet Goethe visited Reil to discuss scientific matters such as psychiatry and to access his skills as a physician.

Reil used the term 'Psychiaterie' in a short-lived journal he set up with J.C. Hoffbauer, titled Beyträge zur Beförderung einer Kurmethode auf psychischem Wege (1808: 169). He argued that there should not only be a branch of medicine (psychische Medizin) or of theology or penal practice, but a discipline in its own right with trained practitioners. He also sought to publicize the plight of the insane within asylums and to develop a psychical method of treatment, consistent with the moral treatment movement of the times. He was critical of Frenchman Philippe Pinel, however. Reil was mainly theoretical, with little direct clinical experience, in contrast with Pinel. Reil is considered a writer within the German Romantic context, and his 1803 work Rhapsodien uber die Anwendung der psychischen Kurmethode auf Geisteszerrüttungen ('Rhapsodies about applying the psychological method of treatment to mental breakdowns') has been called the most important document of Romantic psychiatry. Reil didn't conceptualize madness as a break from reason, but as a reflection of wider social conditions, and believed that advances in civilization created more madness. He saw this as due not to physical lesions in the brain or to hereditary evil, but as a disturbance in the harmony of the mind's functions (forms of awareness or presence), rooted in the nervous system.

Reil also wrote on Blumenbach's idea of the Bildungstrieb (literally, "building power"), a vital force within each organism that compels it to create, maintain, and repair its form. In Reil's essay "Von der Lebenskraft," he argued that each organism contained a "dormant germ" that was activated by the addition of the father's "animal force."

Reil died on 22 November 1813 from typhus contracted while treating the wounded in the Battle of Leipzig, later known as the Battle of the Nations, one of the most severe confrontations of the Napoleonic Wars.

== See also ==
- Emil Kraepelin
- Kurt Schneider

== Sources ==
- Marneros, Andreas (2005): Das Wort Psychiatrie wurde in Halle geboren. ISBN 3-7945-2413-6
