= The Dark Ground of Spirit =

2011 book by Sean J. McGrath

The Dark Ground of Spirit: Schelling and the Unconscious
- Author: Sean J. McGrath
- Language: English
- Subject: Friedrich Wilhelm Joseph Schelling
- Publisher: Routledge
- Publication date: 2011
- Publication place: United States
- Media type: Print (Paperback)
- Pages: 232 pp.
- ISBN: 9780415492126

The Dark Ground of Spirit: Schelling and the Unconscious is a 2012 book by the philosopher Sean J. McGrath, in which the author examines how the psychoanalytical concept of the unconscious originates in German Idealism, especially the work of the German philosopher, Friedrich Wilhelm Joseph Schelling.

== Reception ==
The Dark Ground of Spirit has been reviewed by David Tacey, Benjamin Berger and J. A. F. Marshall.
