= Sean McGrath (philosopher) =

Canadian philosopher

- Born: Sean Joseph McGrath; 1966 (age 59–60)
- Awards: Alexander von Humboldt Research Fellowship; President's Award for Outstanding Research, Memorial University; Member of the College of the Royal Society of Canada, 2014-2021

Education
- Education: University of Toronto; Christian Theological Academy in Warsaw
- Thesis: God and the Being That We Are: Martin Heidegger's Readings of Scholasticism (2002)
- Doctoral advisor: Graeme Nicholson

Philosophical work
- Era: Contemporary philosophy
- Region: Western philosophy
- School: Continental
- Institutions: University of Toronto, Mount Saint Mary's University, Mount Allison University, Memorial University of Newfoundland, McGill University
- Main interests: metaphysics, history of philosophy, philosophy of religion, Christian theology, psychoanalysis

Sean Joseph McGrath (/məˈɡræθ/; born 1966) is a Canadian philosopher and Professor of Philosophy at Memorial University of Newfoundland. He is known for his published work in the history of philosophy and the philosophy of religion. Major single-authored works include The Dark Ground of Spirit: Schelling and the Unconscious (2012), Thinking Nature: An Essay in Negative Ecology (2019), The Philosophical Foundations of the Late Schelling: The Turn to the Positive (2021), and Political Eschatology (2023). McGrath was awarded the President's Award for Outstanding Research at Memorial University in 2012. He was inducted into the Royal Society of Canada as Member of the College of New Scholars in 2014. In 2022, in collaboration with the Centre of the Cross, McGrath released a series of podcasts on secular Christianity called Secular Christ.

== Career ==
In 2002 McGrath earned his PhD in philosophy at the University of Toronto under the supervision of Graeme Nicholson. After many years of teaching and studying at the University of Freiburg, first as a Humboldt fellow and later as a doctoral candidate, McGrath earned his PhD in theology from the Christian Theological Academy in Warsaw in 2017. McGrath taught philosophy at the University of Toronto from 2002 to 2003, at Mount Saint Mary's University from 2003 to 2004, at Mount Allison University from 2004 to 2007, and since 2007 at Memorial University. He was visiting professor in the School of Religious Studies at McGill University from 2019 to 2020. Since 2021, he is adjunct professor in Religious Studies at McGill.

McGrath's publications since graduating from the University of Toronto in 2002 fall broadly into the area known as continental philosophy, but with an interdisciplinary focus that encompasses religion, ecology, and depth psychology. Three areas are predominant in his output: (1) the philosophy of religion and Christian theology; (2) the philosophy of nature; and (3) the philosophy of psychology.

In 2015, with Kyla Bruff (Philosophy, Carleton University) and Barry Stephenson (Religious Studies, Memorial) McGrath founded For a New Earth, a registered NPO in the province of Newfoundland and Labrador. FANE has as its mission “ecological conversion for everyone.”

From 1990 to 1995, McGrath was a professed monk in the contemplative Roman Catholic religious order of the Spiritual Life Institute. After leaving religious life, McGrath pursued graduate studies in both philosophy and theology. He is dedicated to the proposition that "Christianity is not finished with us."

== Books ==
=== Single-authored ===
- The Early Heidegger and Medieval Philosophy: Phenomenology for the Godforsaken (Catholic University of America Press, 2006, reprinted 2013)
- Heidegger: A (Very) Critical Introduction (Eerdmans, 2008)
- The Dark Ground of Spirit: Schelling and the Unconscious (Routledge, 2012)
- Thinking Nature: An Essay in Negative Ecology (Edinburgh University Press, 2019)
- The Philosophical Foundations of the Late Schelling: The Turn to the Positive (Edinburgh University Press, 2021)
- Political Eschatology (Wipf & Stock, 2023)
- The Lost Road (Christian Alternative Books, 2026)

=== Edited and Co-edited ===
- A Companion to Heidegger’s Phenomenology of Religious Life. Co-edited by A. Wiercinski (Rodopi, 2010)
- Rethinking German Idealism. Co-edited by J. Carew (Palgrave-Macmillan, 2016)
- Collected Essays in Speculative Philosophy by James Bradley (Edinburgh University Press, 2021)
- The Palgrave-Macmillan Companion to Schelling. Co-edited by J. Carew and K. Bruff (forthcoming Palgrave-Macmillan, 2024)
