= Johann Friedrich Gottlieb Goldhagen =

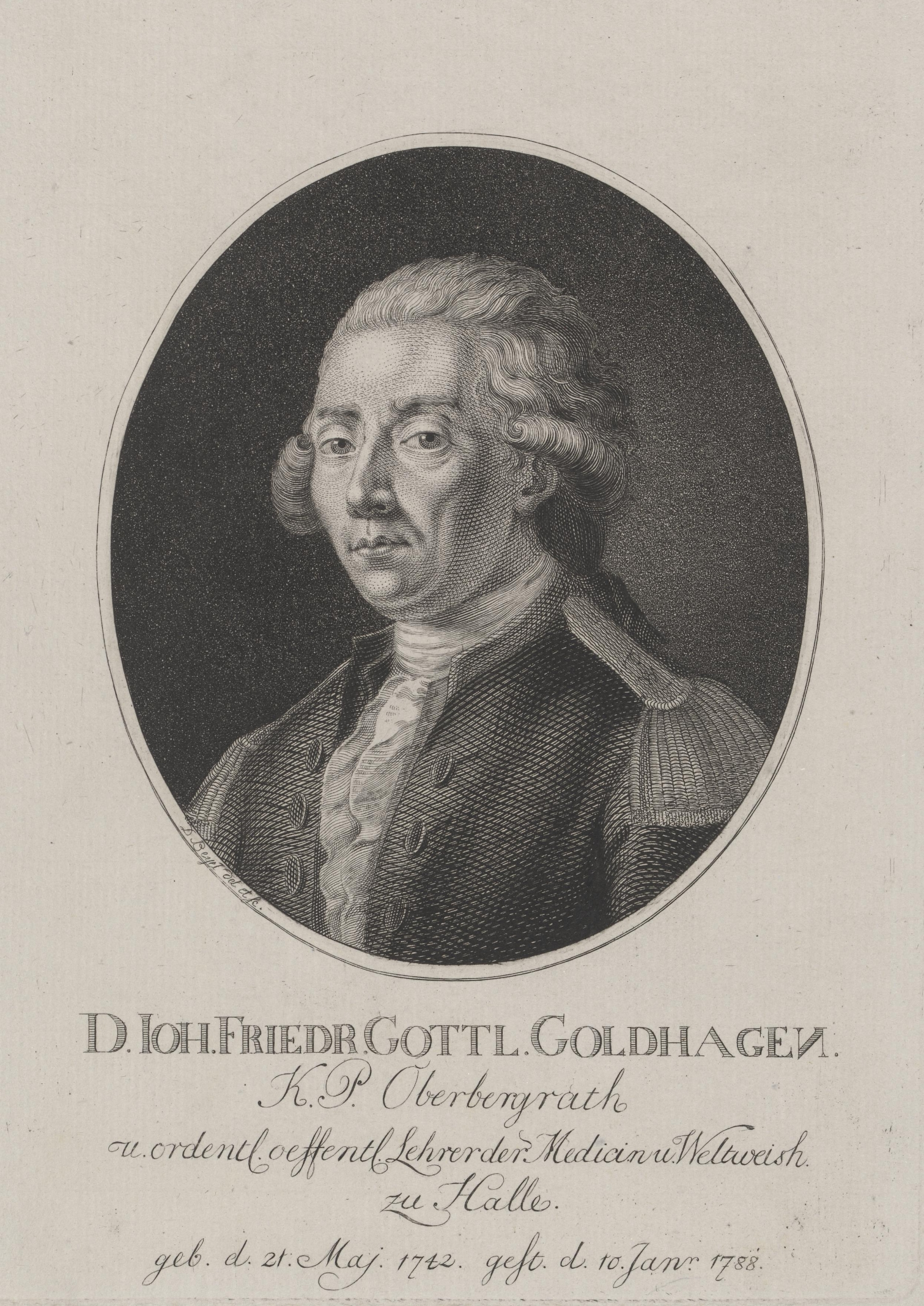

Johann Friedrich Gottlieb Goldhagen (May 21, 1742 – January 10, 1788) was a professor of medicine and natural history at the University of Halle. He built up a large collection of natural history specimens at the university.

== Life and work ==
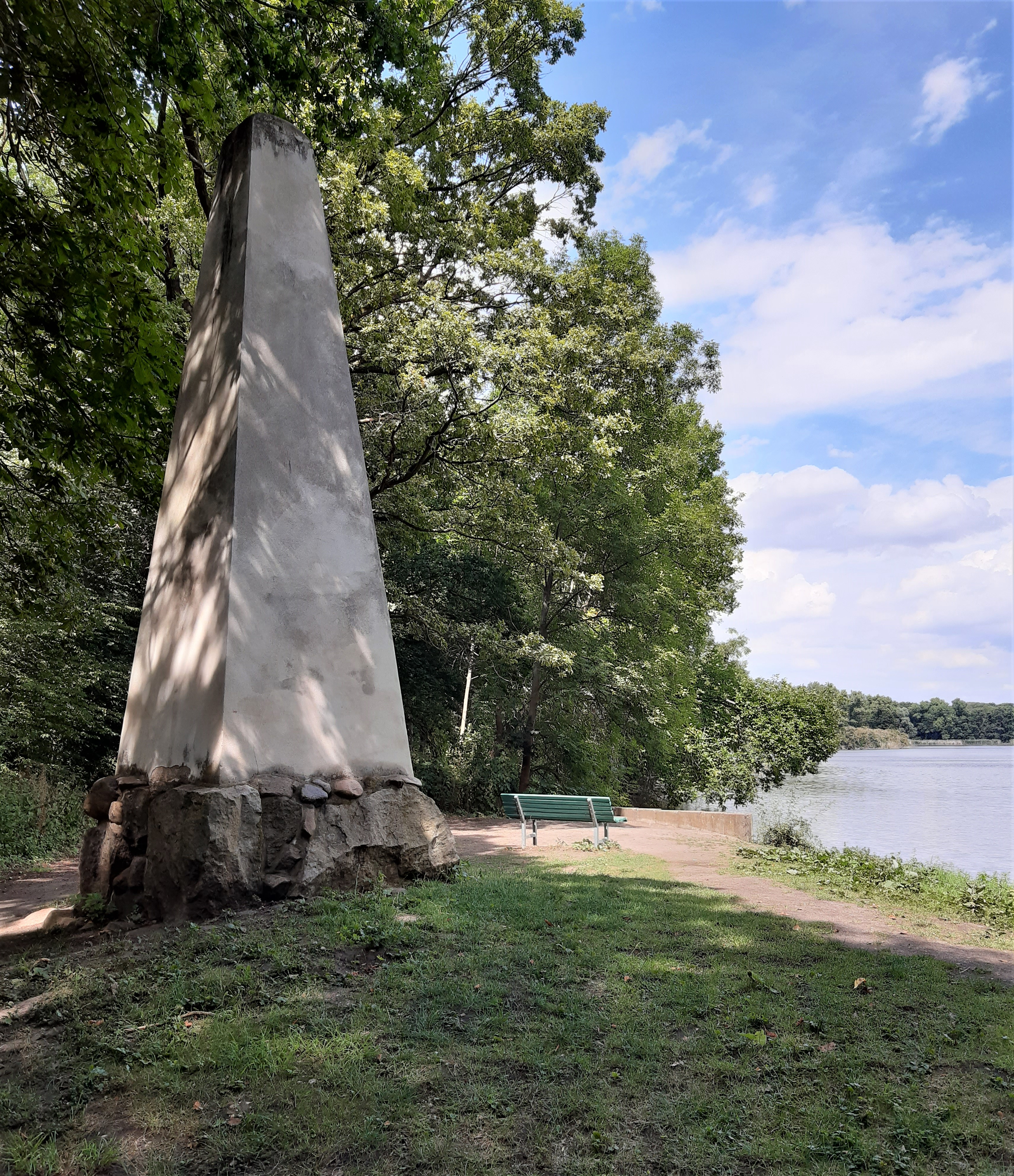
Memorial obelisk at Dieskau

Goldhagen was born in Nordhausen where his father Johann Eustachius was a rector. He studied at the Domgymnasium and when his father moved to Magdeburg in 1753 he went to another church grammar school there. He then went to the Francke Foundation in Halle where his father had also studied. He went to the University of Halle to study medicine in 1760 and attended the lectures of Friedrich Christian Juncker, Philipp Adolph Böhmer and Johann Peter Eberhard. His 1765 dissertation was titled Dubitationes De Quadam Causae Motus Muscularis Explicatione. He taught zoology at the university succeeding the position of Heinrich Christian Alberti. In 1769, with support from Andreas Elias Büchner, he received a position of extraordinary professorship in medicine. He enhanced the collections of the university by adding to the natural cabinet of Friedrich Hoffmann (1660–1742), enriching it with paleontological, anatomical, zoological, and mineralogical specimens. Following the death of Büchner, he became a professor and was made a full professor in 1778. In 1770 he was given citizenship of Halle and was made city physician in 1772.

Goldhagen was a member of the Masonic Lodge "Philadelphia" which later became "To the Three Swords" from 1756 to 1764 and was master from 1778 to 1786. He died of typhus in Halle and was buried in the Halle cemetery. A memorial obelisk was erected in Dieskau castle park by the university chancellor Carl Christoph von Hoffmann. One of his students Johann Christian Reil (1759–1813) succeeded him as professor. Reil also conducted the autopsy of Goldhagen and wrote a report.
