= Philosophy of the Unconscious =

1869 book by Eduard von Hartmann

- Author: Eduard von Hartmann
- Original title: Philosophie des Unbewussten
- Translator: W. C. Coupland
- Language: German
- Subject: Unconscious mind
- Published: 1869 (Duncker, in German); 1884 (in English)
- Publication place: Germany
- Media type: Print (Hardcover and Paperback)
- ISBN: 978-1440050282

Philosophy of the Unconscious: Speculative Results According to the Induction Method of the Physical Sciences (German: Philosophie des Unbewussten) is an 1869 book by the philosopher Eduard von Hartmann. The culmination of the speculations and findings of German Romantic philosophy in the first two-thirds of the 19th century, Philosophy of the Unconscious became famous. By 1882, it had appeared in nine editions. A three-volume English translation appeared in 1884. The English translation is more than 1100 pages long. The work influenced Sigmund Freud's and Carl Jung's theories of the unconscious.

== Reception ==
Philosophy of the Unconscious was translated from German into French and English, and went through many editions in all three languages, exerting a great influence on European culture and helping to make the idea of the unconscious familiar and accepted by the close of the 19th century. The work was widely read. Philosophy of the Unconscious received a critical discussion in the philosopher Franz Brentano's Psychology from an Empirical Standpoint (1874); Brentano commented that Hartmann's definition of consciousness perhaps referred to "something purely imaginary" and certainly did not agree with his definition of consciousness.

The philosopher Friedrich Nietzsche described Hartmann's book as a "philosophy of unconscious irony", in his On the Use and Abuse of History for Life, one of the essays included in Untimely Meditations (1876). In Nietzsche's words: "Take a balance and put Hartmann's 'Unconscious' in one of the scales, and his 'World-process' in the other. There are some who believe they weigh equally; for in each scale there is an evil word—and a good joke."

Hartmann's work has been seen as preparing the way for Freud's later theory of the unconscious. Freud consulted Philosophy of the Unconscious while writing The Interpretation of Dreams (1899), in which he called Hartmann the firmest opponent of the theory that dreams are wish fulfillments. The philosopher Hans Vaihinger was influenced by Philosophy of the Unconscious, relating in his The Philosophy of 'As if' (1911) how it led him to Schopenhauer. The psychiatrist Henri Ellenberger writes in The Discovery of the Unconscious (1970) that the main interest of Hartmann's work is not its philosophical theories, but its wealth of supporting material.

The psychologist Hans Eysenck writes in Decline and Fall of the Freudian Empire (1985) that Hartmann's version of the unconscious is very similar to Freud's. The philosopher Roger Scruton described Philosophy of the Unconscious as the "first major treatise" about the unconscious in Sexual Desire (1986). He credited Hartmann with offering a "canny and vigorous" description of sexual desire, but nevertheless considered him unsuccessful in explaining its intentionality. John Kerr writes that Hartmann's ideas about "destruction and transformation" parallel those of psychoanalyst Sabina Spielrein. The Italian poet Giovanni Pascoli was influenced by Philosophy of the Unconscious in his poetics program, "Il fanciullino" ("The child", 1897).

== English translation ==
The first English translation by W. C. Coupland was published in 1884, with the title Philosophy of the Unconscious, a literal translation of the German title. It is currently available as a reprint with the same title.

== See also ==
- Freud, Biologist of the Mind
