= Eduard von Hartmann =

German philosopher (1842–1906)

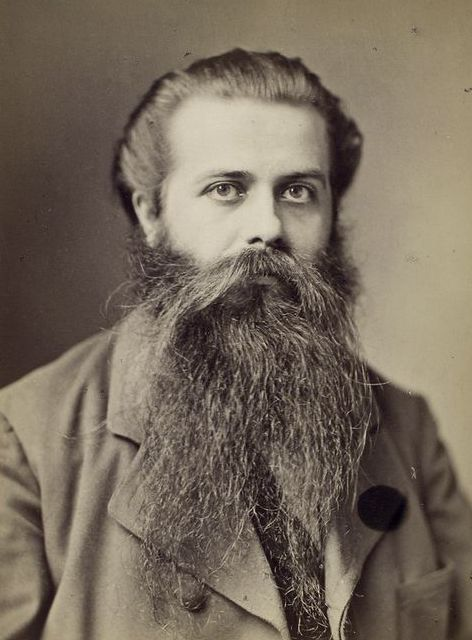
- Von Hartmann in 1885
- Born: Karl Robert Eduard Hartmann; 23 February 1842; Berlin, Brandenburg, Prussia, German Confederation
- Died: 5 June 1906 (aged 64); Groß-Lichterfelde, Berlin, Brandenburg, Prussia, Germany
- Spouses: Agnes Taubert (m. 1872; died 1877) Alma Lorenz (m. 1878)
- Children: 6
- Family: Robert von Hartmann (father)

Education
- Education: United Artillery and Engineering School; University of Rostock (Ph.D., 1867)

Philosophical work
- Era: 19th-century philosophy
- Region: Western philosophy
- School: Post-Kantian philosophy; Transcendental realism; Metaphysical voluntarism; Post-Schopenhauerian pessimism; Pantheism
- Main interests: Aesthetics; Epistemology; Metaphysics; Psychology
- Notable works: Philosophy of the Unconscious (1869)
- Notable ideas: Theory of the unconscious (reason and will as irreducible to each other); Pessimistic interpretation of the "best of all possible worlds" theory
- Military career
- Allegiance: Prussia
- Branch: Prussian Army
- Rank: First lieutenant

Karl Robert Eduard von Hartmann (23 February 1842 – 5 June 1906) was a German philosopher, independent scholar, and writer. He was the author of the influential Philosophy of the Unconscious (1869). Von Hartmann's notable ideas include the theory of the unconscious and a pessimistic interpretation of the "best of all possible worlds" concept in metaphysics.

== Biography ==
=== Early life and military career ===
Von Hartmann was born in Berlin, the son of Prussian Major General Robert von Hartmann, and was educated with the intention of him pursuing a military career. In 1858 he entered the Guards Artillery Regiment of the Prussian Army and attended the United Artillery and Engineering School. He achieved the rank of first lieutenant but took leave from the army in 1865 due to a chronic knee problem.

=== Philosophical career ===
After some hesitation between pursuing music or philosophy, he decided to make the latter his profession, and in 1867 earned his Ph.D. from the University of Rostock. In 1868 he formally resigned from the army. After the great success of his first work Philosophy of the Unconscious (1869)—the publication of which led to von Hartmann being embroiled in the pessimism controversy in Germany—he rejected professorships offered to him by the universities of Leipzig, Göttingen and Berlin.

He subsequently returned to Berlin. For many years, he lived a retired life of study as an independent scholar, doing most of his work in bed, while suffering great pain.

=== Personal life and death ===
von Hartmann married Agnes Taubert (1844–1877) on 3 July 1872 in Charlottenburg. After her death, he married Alma Lorenz (1854–1931) on 4 November 1878 in Bremen. The marriages produced six children.

von Hartmann died at Groß-Lichterfelde on 5 June 1906 and is buried in an honorary grave in the Columbiadamm Cemetery in Berlin.

== Philosophical work ==
His reputation as a philosopher was established by his first book, Philosophy of the Unconscious (1869; 10th edition 1890). This success was largely due to the originality of its title, the diversity of its contents (von Hartmann professing to obtain his speculative results by the methods of inductive science, and making plentiful use of concrete illustrations), its fashionable pessimism and the vigour and lucidity of its style. The conception of the unconscious, by which Von Hartmann describes his ultimate metaphysical principle, is, fundamentally, not as paradoxical as it sounds, being merely a new and mysterious designation for the Absolute of German metaphysicians.

The unconscious is both will and reason (the latter concept also interpreted as idea) and the absolute all-embracing ground of all existence. von Hartmann thus combines pantheism with panlogism in a manner adumbrated by Schelling in his positive philosophy. Nevertheless, will and not reason is the primary aspect of the unconscious, whose melancholy career is determined by the primacy of the will and the latency of the reason. Will is void of reason when it passes from potentiality to actual willing. The original state of the unconscious is one of potentiality, in which, by pure chance, the will begins to strive. In the transition state, called that of the empty will, there is no definite end. Acting on its own, the will creates absolute misery.

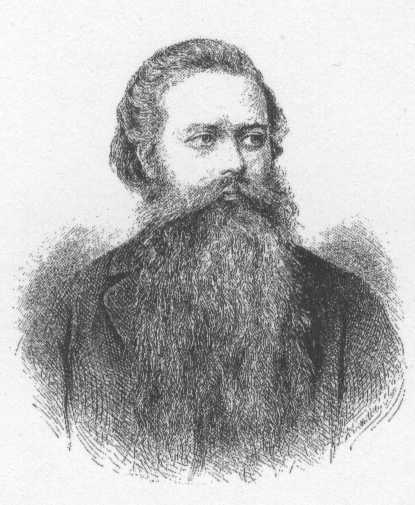
Wood engraving of von Hartmann, c. 1875

To avoid the unhappiness of aimless desire, the will realizes the ideas already potentially present and the unconscious becomes actual. The existence of the universe is the result, then, of the illogical will, but its characteristics and laws are all due to the idea or reason and are, therefore, logical. It is the best of all possible worlds, which contains the promise of the redemption of the unconscious from actual existence by the exercise of reason in partnership with the will in the consciousness of the enlightened pessimist.

The history of the world is that given by natural science, and particular emphasis is laid upon the Darwinian theory of evolution. Humanity developed from the animal, and with the appearance of the first human being the deliverance of the world is in sight, for only in the human being does consciousness reach such height and complexity as to act independently of the will. As consciousness develops, there is a constantly growing recognition of the fact that deliverance must lie in a return to the original state of non-willing, which means the non-existence of all individuals and the potentiality of the unconscious. When the greater part of the will in existence is so far enlightened by reason as to perceive the inevitable misery of existence, a collective effort to will non-existence will be made, and the world will relapse into nothingness, the unconscious into quiescence.

von Hartmann called his philosophy a transcendental realism, because in it he professed to reach by means of induction from the broadest possible basis of experience a knowledge of that which lies beyond experience. A certain portion of consciousness, namely perception, begins, changes and ends without our consent and often in direct opposition to our desires. Perception, then, cannot be adequately explained from the ego alone, and the existence of things outside experience must be posited. Moreover, since they act upon consciousness and do so in different ways at different times, they must have those qualities assigned to them which would make such action possible. Causality is thus made the link that connects the subjective world of ideas with the objective world of things.

An examination of the rest of experience, especially such phenomena as instinct, voluntary motion, sexual love, artistic production and the like, makes it evident that will and Idea, unconscious but teleological, are everywhere operative, and that the underlying force is one and not many. This thing-in-itself may be called "the unconscious." It has two equally original attributes, namely, will and idea (or reason).

The unconscious appears as a combination of the metaphysics of Georg Wilhelm Friedrich Hegel with that of Arthur Schopenhauer. In von Hartmann's view, Hegel and Schopenhauer were both wrong in making idea or reason subordinate to will or will subordinate to idea or reason; on the contrary, neither can act alone, and neither is the result of the other. The will's lack of logic causes the existence of the "that" (German: Daß) of the world; the idea or reason, though not conscious, is logical, and determines the essence, the "what" (German: Was). The endless and vain striving of the will necessitates the great preponderance of suffering in the universe, which could not well be more wretched than it is. Nevertheless, it must be characterized as the best possible world, for both nature and history are constantly developing in the manner best adapted to the ending of the world; and by means of increasing consciousness the idea, instead of prolonging suffering to eternity, provides a refuge from the evils of existence in non-existence.

von Hartmann is a pessimist, for no other view of life recognizes that evil necessarily belongs to existence and can cease only with existence itself. But he is not an unmitigated pessimist. The individual's happiness is indeed unattainable either here and now or hereafter and in the future, but he does not despair of ultimately releasing the unconscious from its sufferings. He differs from Schopenhauer in making salvation by the negation of the will to live depend on a collective social effort and not on individualistic asceticism. The conception of a redemption of the unconscious also supplies the ultimate basis of von Hartmann's ethics. We must provisionally affirm life and devote ourselves to social evolution, instead of striving after a happiness which is impossible; in so doing we shall find that morality renders life less unhappy than it would otherwise be. Suicide, and all other forms of selfishness, are highly reprehensible. His realism enables him to maintain the reality of Time, and so of the process of the world's redemption.

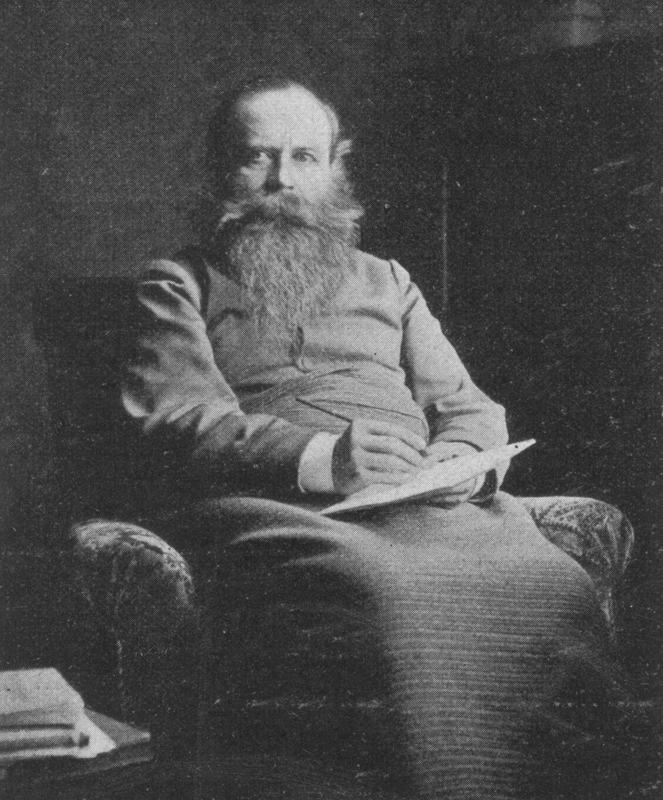
von Hartmann in 1902

The essential feature of the morality built upon the basis of von Hartmann's philosophy is the realization that all is one and that, while every attempt to gain happiness is illusory, yet before deliverance is possible, all forms of the illusion must appear and be tried to the utmost. Even he who recognizes the vanity of life best serves the highest aims by giving himself up to the illusion, and living as eagerly as if he thought life good. It is only through the constant attempt to gain happiness that people can learn the desirability of nothingness; and when this knowledge has become universal, or at least general, deliverance will come and the world will cease. No better proof of the rational nature of the universe is needed than that afforded by the different ways in which men have hoped to find happiness and so have been led unconsciously to work for the final goal. The first of these is the hope of good in the present, the confidence in the pleasures of this world, such as was felt by the Greeks. This is followed by the Christian transference of happiness to another and better life, to which in turn succeeds the illusion that looks for happiness in progress, and dreams of a future made worthwhile by the achievements of science. All alike are empty promises, and known as such in the final stage, which sees all human desires as equally vain and the only good in the peace of Nirvana.

The relation between philosophy and religion lies in their common recognition of an underlying unity, which transcends all the apparent differences and divisions due to individual phenomena. Many changes must take place in the existing religions before they will be suited to modern conditions, and the resulting religion of the future will be a concrete monism.

von Hartmann's Philosophy of the Unconscious has been the subject of many different estimates, but is regarded as having less intrinsic than historical value. Its influence upon other thinkers was especially marked during the years following its first appearance, but by the early 20th century that influence had much decreased. However, there are some grounds for considering it as providing the connection of thought between Schopenhauer's philosophy of the 'will' and Sigmund Freud's psychology of the 'unconscious'. In a sense his thought creates the bridge between the post-Kantian views of Will (in particular Schopenhauer's) and the Zürich school of psychology.

== Reception ==
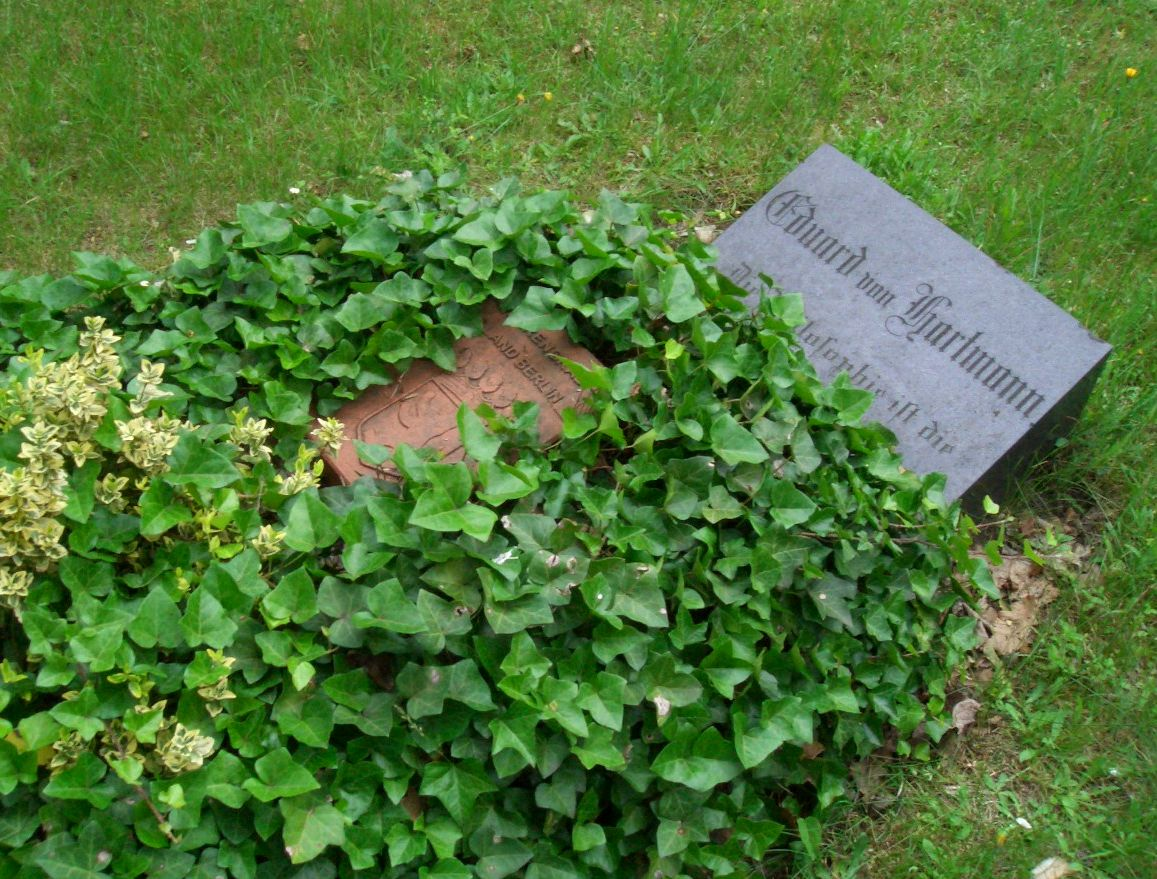
von Hartmann's grave in Berlin

Rudolf Steiner, referring to von Hartmann's Critical Establishment of Transcendental Realism (Kritische Grundlegung des transzendentalen Realismus, 2nd Edition Berlin, 1875), gave his opinion, in the preface to his own book Truth and Knowledge (1892), that von Hartmann's world-view was "the most significant philosophical work of our time", even though Steiner considered himself to be considerably misunderstood by Hartmann and was critical of some of Hartmann's postulates.

Carl Jung wrote in his autobiography, Memories, Dreams, Reflections (1963), that he had read von Hartmann "assiduously".

Philipp Mainländer dedicated an essay to the philosophy of von Hartmann. He did not consider him to be a genuine philosopher, because he did not start his philosophy with an epistemological research, despite the warnings of Kant and Schopenhauer. The criticism has been described as an attack abounding in clean hits but marred by bitter sarcasm, such as "is the coitus a sacrifice the individual makes? You must be – I repeat it – a very strangely organized being", (Note: "Ist der Beischlaf ein Opfer, das das Individuum bringt? Sie müssen – ich wiederhole es – ein ganz sonderbar organisirtes Wesen sein.") and for denying Schopenhauer's deduction that the will is the thing-in-itself: "you also have the sad honor, to stand at the same level as those who have misunderstood Copernicus and still confidently believe that the sun turns around the earth." (Note: "Sie haben auch den traurigen Ruhm, auf gleicher Stufe mit Jenen zu stehen, welche Copernicus nicht begriffen haben und nach wie vor zuversichtlich glauben, daß sich die Sonne um die Erde drehe.")

Friedrich Nietzsche offers a scathing criticism of von Hartmann, calling his philosophy "unconscious irony" and "roguery", in the second of his Untimely Meditations, On the Use and Abuse of History for Life. In Beyond Good and Evil he hurled the epithets "amalgamist" and "hotch-potch philosopher" at him.

In the book Treatise on Critical Reason, Hans Albert references von Hartmann's book Über die dialektische Methode to reference his description of the dialectical method before Hegel and also von Hartmann's critique of Hegel's dialectic.

British filmmaker and author Edouard d'Araille provides a modern-day appraisal of the philosophy of von Hartmann in his introductory essay to the 2001 edition (3 volumes) of The Philosophy of the Unconscious. He evaluates von Hartmann as the vital link between the vitalism of Arthur Schopenhauer and the psychology of the Unconscious of Sigmund Freud.

== Works ==
=== Systematic ===
- Das Ding an sich und seine Beschaffenheit ("The thing in itself and its nature", 1871)
- Grundprobleme der Erkenntnistheorie ("Fundamental problems of epistemology", 1889)
- Kategorienlehre ("Doctrine of the Categories", 1896)
- Phänomenologie des sittlichen Bewußtseins ("Phenomenology of Moral Consciousness", 1879)
- Die Philosophie des Schönen ("'The Philosophy of the Beautiful", 1887)
- Die Religion des Geistes ("The Religion of the Spirit"; 1882)
- Philosophie des Unbewussten ("Philosophy of the Unconscious", 3 volumes, which now include his, originally anonymous, self-criticism, Das Unbewusste vom Standpunkte der Physiologie und Descendenztheorie, and its refutation, Eng. trans. by William Chatterton Coupland, 1884)
- System der Philosophie im Grundriss, ("Plan for a System of Philosophy", 8 volumes, 1907–09: posthumous)
- Beiträge zur Naturphilosophie ("Contributions to Natural Philosophy", 1876)

=== Historical and critical ===
- Das religiöse Bewusstsein der Menschheit (The Religious Consciousness of Mankind in the Stages of Its Development; 1881)
- Geschichte der Metaphysik (2 volumes)
- Kants Erkenntnistheorie
- Kritische Grundlegung des transcendentalen Realismus (Critical Grounds of Transcendental Realism)
- Uber die dialektische Methode (1868)
- Lotzes Philosophie (1888) (a study on Hermann Lotze)
- Zur Geschichte und Begründung des Pessimismus (1880)
- Neukantianismus, Schopenhauerismus, Hegelianismus
- Geschichte der deutschen Ästhetik und Kant
- Die Krisis des Christentums in der modernen Theologie (The Crisis of Christianity in Modern Theology; 1880)
- Philosophische Fragen der Gegenwart
- Ethische Studien
- Aesthetik (1886–87)
- Moderne Psychologie
- Das Christentum des neuen Testaments
- Die Weltanschauung der modernen Physik
- Wahrheit und Irrthum im Darwinismus (1875)
- Zur Reform des höheren Schulwesens (1875)

=== Popular ===
- Aphorismen über das Drama (1870)
- Shakespeares Romeo und Juliet (1875)
- Soziale Kernfragen (The Fundamental Social Questions; 1894)
- Moderne Probleme
- Tagesfragen
- Zwei Jahrzehnte deutscher Politik und die gegenwärtige Weltlage (1888)
- Das Judentum in Gegenwart und Zukunft (Judaism in the Present and the Future; 1885)
- Die Selbstzersetzung des Christentums und die Religion der Zukunft (1874)
- Gesammelte Studien
- Der Spiritismus (1885)
- Die Geisterhypothese des Spiritismus (The Ghost Theory in Spiritism; 1891)
- Zur Zeitgeschichte

His select works were published in 10 volumes.
