= The Early Heidegger and Medieval Philosophy =

2006 book by Sean J. McGrath

The Early Heidegger and Medieval Philosophy: Phenomenology for the Godforsaken
- Author: Sean J. McGrath
- Subject: Heidegger's philosophy
- Published: 2006, reprinted 2013
- Publisher: Catholic University of America Press
- Pages: 288 pp.
- ISBN: 9780813221878

The Early Heidegger and Medieval Philosophy: Phenomenology for the Godforsaken is a 2006 book by Sean J. McGrath, in which the author critiques secularization through examining the relationship between Martin Heidegger's thought and late medieval and early Protestant Christianity.

== Synopsis ==
Struck by the analogies between the thought of the early Heidegger and late medieval and early Protestant Christianity, McGrath argues in his book that the similarities are not accidental. After archival work in Germany, McGrath argues (with Max Scheler and Jacques Derrida), that Heidegger, an ex-seminarian and former Catholic, had secularized Christian concepts in Being and Time. Heidegger's book went on to become a foundational text in 20th century atheist thought, but according to McGrath its major themes would not have been possible to realise without Christianity.

== Reception ==
Reviews of the book have been written by Philipp Rosemann, James D. Reid, Christian Lotz and Michael L. Raposa. After the publication of The Early Heidegger and Medieval Philosophy the Centre for Theology and Philosophy at the University of Nottingham, the theological think-tank headed by the Anglican theologian John Milbank, commissioned McGrath to write a short critique of Heidegger for theologians.
