= Bibliography of philosophical pessimism =

This is a bibliography of philosophical pessimism, a philosophical tradition which argues that life is not worth living and that non-existence is preferable to existence.

== Primary literature ==
=== Books ===
- Becker, Ernest (2007). The Denial of Death. Free Press. ISBN 978-1-4165-9034-7.
- Benatar, David (2006). Better Never to Have Been: The Harm of Coming into Existence. Oxford University Press. ISBN 978-0199296422.
- Benatar, David (2017). The Human Predicament: A Candid Guide to Life's Biggest Questions. Oxford: Oxford University Press. ISBN 978-0-19-063381-3.
- Brassier, Ray (2007). Nihil Unbound: Enlightenment and Extinction. Palgrave Macmillan. ISBN 978-0230522046.
- Cabrera, Julio (2019). Discomfort and Moral Impediment: The Human Situation, Radical Bioethics and Procreation. Newcastle upon Tyne: Cambridge Scholars Publishing. ISBN 978-1-5275-1803-2. OCLC 1078636651.
- Camus, Albert (2018) [1942]. The Myth of Sisyphus. Vintage. ISBN 978-0525564454.
- Cioran, Emil (1996) [1934]. On the Heights of Despair. Translated by Zarifopol-Johnston, Ilinca. Chicago: University of Chicago Press. ISBN 978-0226106717.
- Cioran, Emil (2013) [1973]. The Trouble with Being Born. Translated by Howard, Richard. New York: Arcade Publishing. ISBN 978-1611457407.
- Cioran, Emil (2012) [1949]. A Short History of Decay [Précis de decomposition]. Translated by Howard, Richard. New York: Arcade Publishing. ISBN 978-1-61145-736-0.
- Cooper, David E. (2024). Pessimism, Quietism and Nature as Refuge. Newcastle upon Tyne: Agenda. ISBN 978-1788217705.
- Gray, John (2002). Straw Dogs: Thoughts on Humans and Other Animals. London: Granta Books. ISBN 978-0374270933.
- Dalton, Drew M. (2023). The Matter of Evil: From Speculative Realism to Ethical Pessimism. Evanston: Northwestern University Press. ISBN 978-0810146402.
- Leopardi, Giacomo (1882) [1827]. Essays and Dialogues [Operette Morali]. Translated by Edwardes, Charles. London: Trübner & co., Lundgate Hill.
- Ligotti, Thomas (2011). The Conspiracy Against the Human Race: A Contrivance of Horror. New York: Hippocampus Press. ISBN 978-0-9844802-7-2. OCLC 805656473.
- Mainländer, Philipp (2024) [1876]. Philosophy of Redemption [Die Philosophie der Erlösung]. Brisbane: Irukandji Press. ISBN 978-0-6454980-7-3.
- Michelstaedter, Carlo (2004). Valentino, Russell Scott; Blum, Cinzia Sartini; Depew, David J. (eds.). Persuasion and Rhetoric. Yale University Press. ISBN 9780300104349.
- Schopenhauer, Arthur (2010) [1818]. Welchman, Alistair; Janaway, -first=Christopher; Norman, Norman (eds.). The World as Will and Representation. Vol. 1. Cambridge: Cambridge University Press. doi:10.1017/CBO9780511780943. ISBN 978-0-521-87184-6.
- Schopenhauer, Arthur (2018) [1844]. Welchman, Alistair; Janaway, Christopher; Norman, Judith (eds.). The World as Will and Representation. Vol. 2. Cambridge: Cambridge University Press. doi:10.1017/9780511843112. ISBN 978-1316616420.
- Schopenhauer, Arthur (2016) [1851]. Roehr, Sabine; Janaway, Christopher (eds.). Parerga and Paralipomena: Short Philosophical Essays. Vol. 1. Cambridge: Cambridge University Press. ISBN 978-0-521-87138-9.
- Schopenhauer, Arthur (2017) [1851]. Adrian, Del Caro; Janaway, Christopher (eds.). Parerga and Paralipomena: Short Philosophical Essays. Vol. 2. Cambridge: Cambridge University Press. ISBN 978-1108436526.
- von Hartmann, Eduard (1884) [1869]. Philosophy of the Unconscious: Speculative Results According to the Inductive Method of Physical Science. Translated by Coupland, William Chatterton. London: Trübner & co., Lundgate Hill.
- Thacker, Eugene (2018). Infinite Resignation. Minneapolis: Repeater. ISBN 978-1912248193.
- Unamuno, Miguel de. The Tragic Sense of Life.
- Zapffe, Peter Wessel (2024) [1941]. On the Tragic. Translated by Showler, Ryan L. New York: Peter Lang. doi:10.3726/b20965. ISBN 978-1-636-67488-9. LCCN 2023043423.

=== Book chapters ===
- Metzinger, Thomas (2017). "Suffering" (PDF). In Almqvist, Kurt; Haag, Anders (eds.). The Return of Consciousness. Stockholm: Axel and Margaret Ax:son Johnson Foundation. pp. 237–262. ISBN 978-91-89672-90-1.

=== Essays ===
- Tønnessen, Herman (1966). "Happiness is for the Pigs". Journal of Existentialism. No. VII. pp. 181–214.
- Zapffe, Peter Wessel (2004) [1933]. "The Last Messiah". Philosophy Now. No. 45. Translated by Tangenes, Gisle R. pp. 35–39. ISSN 0961-5970. Archived from the original on 2020-09-22.

=== Academic papers ===
- Contestabile, Bruno (2016). "The Denial of the World from an Impartial View". Contemporary Buddhism. 17 (1): 49–61. doi:10.1080/14639947.2015.1104003. S2CID 148168698. Archived from the original on 2020-09-28. Penultimate draft Archived 2023-09-02 at the Wayback Machine
- Hathaway, Amalie J. (September 1881 – July 1882). "Schopenhauer". Education. 2: 234–252.
- Kahane, Guy (2023). "Was evolution worth it?". Philosophical Studies. 180 (1): 249–271. doi:10.1007/s11098-022-01893-4. Archived from the original on 2023-03-22.
- Plumacher, O. (1879). "Pessimism". Mind. 4 (13): 68–89. doi:10.1093/mind/os-4.13.68. ISSN 0026-4423.
- Prescott, Paul (2012). "What Pessimism Is". Journal of Philosophical Research. 37: 337–356. doi:10.5840/jpr20123716.

== Secondary literature ==
=== Books ===
- Beiser, Frederick C. (2016). Weltschmerz: Pessimism in German Philosophy, 1860–1900. Oxford: Oxford University Press. ISBN 978-0-19-876871-5. OCLC 929590292. Archived from the original on 2024-09-29.
- Caro, E. (1878). Le pessimisme au XIXe siècle: Leopardi—Schopenhauer—Hartmann [Pessimism in the 19th Century: Leopardi—Schopenhauer—Hartmann] (in French). Paris: Hachette et cie.
- Coates, Ken (2016). Anti-Natalism: Rejectionist Philosophy from Buddhism to Benatar. First Edition Design Publishing. ISBN 978-1506-902-40-1.
- Dienstag, Joshua Foa (2009). Pessimism: Philosophy, Ethic, Spirit. Princeton, New Jersey: Princeton University Press. ISBN 978-0-691-14112-1.
- Feltham, Colin (2016). Depressive Realism: Interdisciplinary Perspectives. Routledge. ISBN 978-1-317-58482-7.
- Hassan, Patrick (2023). Nietzsche's Struggle against Pessimism. Cambridge: Cambridge University Press. ISBN 978-1009380270.
- Saltus, Edgar (1885). The Philosophy of Disenchantment. New York: Belford. Archived from the original on 2023-08-05.
- Segev, Mor (2022). The Value of the World and of Oneself: Philosophical Optimism and Pessimism from Aristotle to Modernity. Oxford: Oxford University Press. ISBN 978-0-197-63407-3.
- Sully, James (1877). Pessimism: A History and a Criticism. London: Henry S. King & Co.
- Tsanoff, Radoslav A. (1931). The Nature of Evil. New York: The MacMillan Company.
- van der Lugt, Mara (2021). Dark Matters: Pessimism and the Problem of Suffering. Princeton: Princeton University Press. ISBN 978-0-691-20662-2.
- Mark, Schmitt (2023). Spectres of Pessimism: A Cultural Logic of the Worst. Palgrave Macmillan. ISBN 978-3031253515.
- Pedder, Vladislav (2026). Processual Pessimism: On the Nature of Cosmic Suffering and Human Nothingness. Moscow: Ridero. ISBN 978-5-0069-0818-5.

=== Book chapters ===
- Beiser, Frederick C. (2024-03-21), "Two Female Pessimists", in Gjesdal, Kristin; Nassar, Dalia (eds.), The Oxford Handbook of Nineteenth-Century Women Philosophers in the German Tradition (1 ed.), Oxford University Press, pp. 471–492, doi:10.1093/oxfordhb/9780190066239.013.30, ISBN 978-0-19-006623-9
- Cholbi, Michael (2021). "Schopenhauer, Suicide, and Contemporary Pessimism". In Hassan, Patrick (ed.). Schopenhauer's Moral Philosophy. New York: Routledge. pp. 141–159. doi:10.4324/9781003090953-8. ISBN 978-0367547721.
- Janaway, Christopher (1999). "Schopenhauer's Pessimism". In Janaway, Christopher (ed.). The Cambridge Companion to Schopenhauer. Cambridge: Cambridge University Press. pp. 318–343. doi:10.1017/CCOL0521621062.011. ISBN 978-0521621069.
- Simmons, Byron (2024). "Schopenhauer's Pessimism". In Bather Woods, David; Stoll, Timothy (eds.). The Schopenhauerian Mind. Oxon: Routledge. pp. 282–296. ISBN 9780367501532.

=== Academic papers ===
- Bather Woods, David (2025). "Schopenhauer's worst of all possible worlds". British Journal for the History of Philosophy. Routledge: 1–16. doi:10.1080/09608788.2025.2543360. Archived from the original (PDF) on 2025-08-30.
- Fox, Joshua Isaac (2022). "Does Schopenhauer Accept Any Positive Pleasures?". European Journal of Philosophy. 31 (4): 902–913. doi:10.1111/ejop.12830.
- Hassan, Patrick (2021). "Individual vs. World in Schopenhauer's Pessimism". The Southern Journal of Philosophy. 59 (2): 122–152. doi:10.1111/sjp.12401. S2CID 234303325. Archived from the original on 2023-08-18.
- Hassan, Patrick (2021). "Striving as Suffering: Schopenhauer's A Priori Argument for Pessimism". Philosophia. 49 (4): 1487–1505. doi:10.1007/s11406-020-00316-0. S2CID 234157970. Archived from the original on 2023-08-18.
- Janaway, Christopher (2018). "Schopenhauer on the Aimlessness of the Will". British Journal for the History of Philosophy. 26 (2): 331–347. doi:10.1080/09608788.2017.1393619. Archived from the original on 2023-11-05.
- Janaway, Christopher (2022). "Worse than the best possible pessimism? Olga Plümacher's critique of Schopenhauer". British Journal for the History of Philosophy. 30 (2): 211–230. doi:10.1080/09608788.2021.1881441. S2CID 233897050.
- Prescott, Paul (2012). "What Pessimism Is" (PDF). Journal of Philosophical Research. 37: 337–356. doi:10.5840/jpr20123716. Archived (PDF) from the original on 2023-10-12.
- Simmons, Byron (2021). "A Thousand Pleasures Are Not Worth a Single Pain: The Compensation Argument for Schopenhauer's Pessimism". European Journal of Philosophy. 29 (1): 120–136. doi:10.1111/ejop.12561. S2CID 225685721. Archived from the original on 2023-08-18.

=== PhD theses ===
- Dahlkvist, Tobias (2007). Nietzsche and the Philosophy of Pessimism. A Study of Nietzsche's Relation to the Pessimistic Tradition: Schopenhauer, Hartmann, Leopardi (PhD thesis). Uppsala Studies in History of Ideas. Vol. 35. Uppsala: Acta Universitatis Upsaliensis. ISBN 978-91-554-6963-4. ISSN 1653-5197.
- Fox, Joshua Isaac (2021). Existential Pessimism and Aesthetic Experience: Mill, Schopenhauer, and Nietzsche on Life's Value (PDF) (PhD thesis). Chicago, Illinois: The University of Chicago.
- Moya, Ignacio L. (2023). Human Extinction in the Pessimist Tradition (PhD thesis). The University of Western Ontario.

== Books in other languages ==
There are also some works that have no English translations or which translated versions vary to a high degree with respect to the original.

- Bahnsen, Julius (1877). Das Tragische als Weltgesetz und der Humor als ästhetische Gestalt des Metaphysischen [The Tragical as World Law and Humor as Aesthetic Shape of the Metaphysical] (in German). Lauenberg: Verlag von F. Ferley.
- Cabrera, Julio (2018). Mal-estar e moralidade: situação humana, ética e procriação responsável [Discomfort and morality: the human situation, ethics and responsible procreation] (in Brazilian Portuguese). Brasília: Editora Universidade de Brasília. ISBN 978-85-230-1218-2.
- Cabrera, Julio (2020). La Forma Del Mundo: Ensayo sobre la muerte del ser. Elementos de Metafilosofía Primera [The Form Of The World: Essay on the death of being. Elements of the First Metaphilosophy] (in Spanish). Florianópolis: Ed. do Autor. ISBN 978-6500084023.
- Horstmann, Ulrich (1985). Das Untier: Konturen einer Philosophie der Menschenflucht (in German). Suhrkamp. ISBN 978-3518376720.
- Mainländer, Philipp (1996) [1876]. Die Philosophie Der Erlosung. Erster Band [Philosophy of Redemption. Volume 1] (in German). Olms, Georg Verlag AG. ISBN 978-3487095561.
- Mainländer, Philipp (1996) [1886]. Die Philosophie Der Erlosung. Zweiter Band [Philosophy of Redemption. Volume 2] (in German). Olms, Georg Verlag AG. ISBN 978-3487095578.
- Taubert, A. (1872). Philosophie gegen naturwissenschaftliche ueberhebung: Eine zurechtweisung des dr. med. Geo Stiebeling und seiner angeblichen widerlegung der Hartmann schen lehre vom unbewussten in der leiblichkeit [Philosophy Against the Overreach of Natural Sciences: A Rebuttal to Dr. Geo Stiebeling and His Alleged Refutation of Hartmann's Doctrine of the Unconscious in Corporality] (in German). Berlin: Duncker.
- Taubert, A. (1873). Der pessimismus und seine gegner [Pessimism and Its Opponents] (in German). Berlin: Carl Duncker's verlag (C. Heymons).
