= Philosophical pessimism =

View that life and existence are of negative value

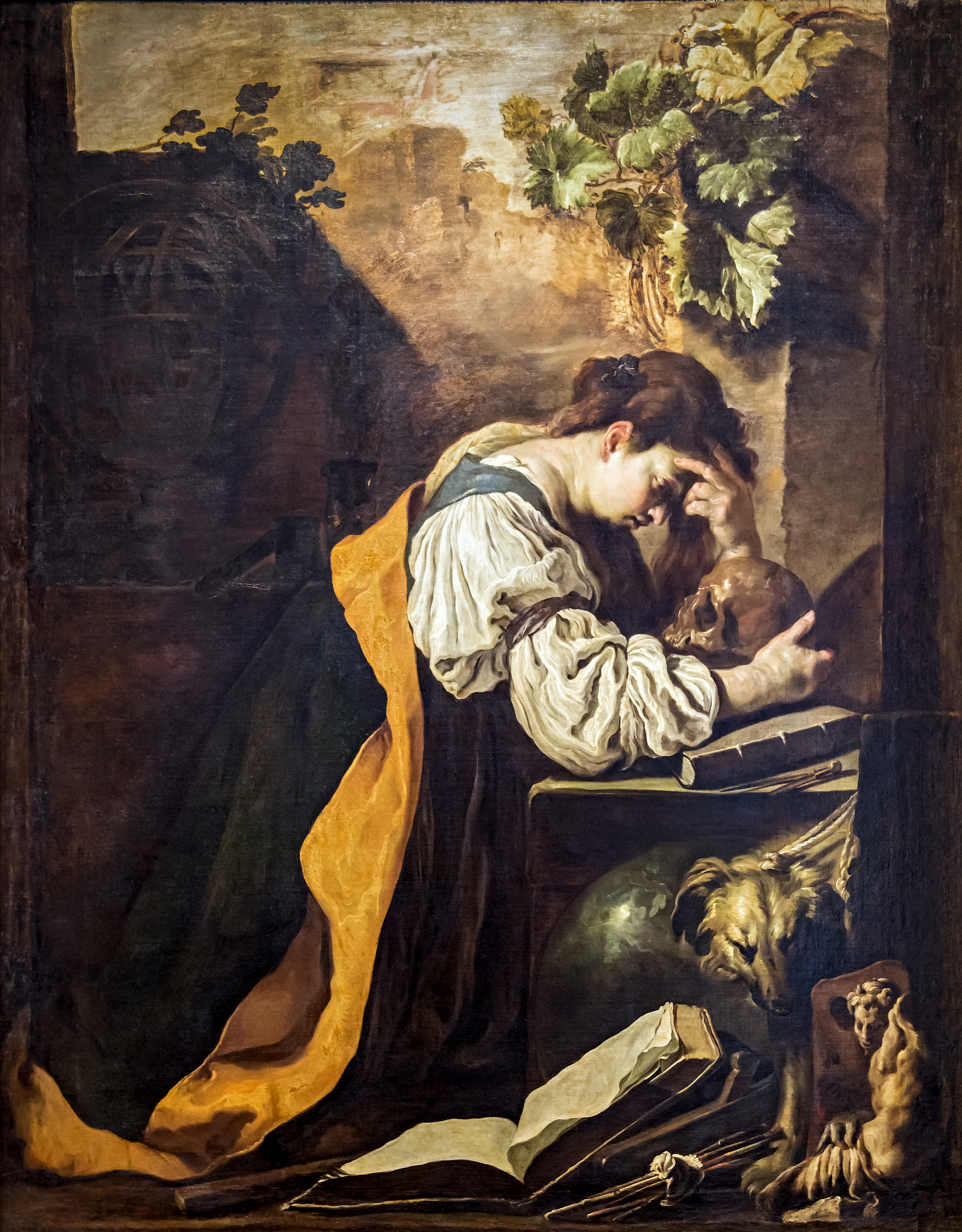
Melancholy by Domenico Fetti (1612). Death, suffering and meaninglessness are central topics in discussions of philosophical pessimism.

Philosophical pessimism is the view that life or existence has negative value. It is often stated as the claim that life is not worth living, or that non-existence would be preferable to coming into or remaining in existence. Other accounts define it by the claim that suffering and other harms outweigh pleasure and other goods, that happiness is unstable or unattainable, or that existence has no inherent meaning or purpose.

Pessimistic themes appear in several religious and philosophical traditions, including parts of Buddhism, the book of Ecclesiastes, some forms of Gnosticism, and the work of Hegesias of Cyrene. In the 19th century, Arthur Schopenhauer gave pessimism a systematic form in The World as Will and Representation. Later German philosophers, including Eduard von Hartmann and Philipp Mainländer, developed related systems. In the 20th and 21st centuries, writers including Peter Wessel Zapffe, Emil Cioran, Thomas Ligotti, David Benatar, Julio Cabrera, and Drew Dalton have argued for pessimistic positions using claims from ethics, psychology, metaphysics, and the natural sciences.

Arguments for pessimism often concern the relation between pleasure and suffering; whether later goods can compensate for earlier or simultaneous harms; life as striving, frustration, boredom, and decay; asymmetries between the harms and benefits of coming into existence; the absence of cosmic meaning; and the suffering of non-human animals, including wild animal suffering. Pessimists have proposed different responses to these claims, including renunciation, compassion, political or social reform, antinatalism, voluntary extinction, and positions on suicide and abortion. Critics, including Friedrich Nietzsche, Albert Camus, Bertrand Russell, Bryan Magee, and James Sully, have disputed both the arguments for pessimism and its psychological basis.

== Definitions ==
The word pessimism comes from Latin pessimus, meaning "the worst". The term "optimism" was first used for Leibniz's thesis that this is "the best of all possible worlds"; "pessimism" was coined for the opposing view. Schopenhauer argued that the world is the worst of all possible worlds.

Many scholars define philosophical pessimism as the view that life is not worth living, or that non-existence is preferable to existence. Other writers define it by the claim that the evils of life outweigh its goods, Some think of it as "the denial of happiness or the affirmation of life's inherent misery". Kidd thinks of the core of pessimism as the judgments that life contains entrenched features that undermine our efforts of achieving meaningful goods and there is little hope we could change that, with specific doctrines of pessimism adding additional claims on top.

== Themes ==
Reaching a pessimistic conclusion can be approached in various manners, with numerous arguments reinforcing this perspective. However, certain recurring themes consistently emerge:

- Life is not worth living. In short, pessimists view existence, overall, as having a deleterious effect on living beings: to be alive is to be put in a bad position.
- The bad prevails over the good — generally, the bad wins over the good. This can be understood in two ways. Firstly, one can make a case that — irrespective of the quantities of goods and evils — the suffering cannot be compensated for by the good. Secondly, one can make a case that there is a predominance of bad things over good things.
- Non-existence is preferable to existence. This point can be understood in one of the two following ways. Firstly, one can argue that, for any individual being, it would have been better had they never existed. Secondly, various pessimists have argued that the non-existence of the whole world would be better than its existence.

== Development of pessimist thought ==
Pessimistic sentiments can be found throughout religions and in the works of various philosophers. The major developments in the tradition started with the works of German philosopher Arthur Schopenhauer, who was the first to provide an explanation for why there is so much misery in the world and construct a complete philosophical system in which pessimism played a major role.

=== Ancient times ===
Hegesias of Cyrene, who lived in ancient Greece, argued that lasting happiness could not be realized because of constant bodily ills and the impossibility of achieving all one's goals.

One of the central points of Buddhism, which originated in ancient India, is the claim that life is full of suffering and unsatisfactoriness. This is known as duḥkha in the Four Noble Truths. In the book of Ecclesiastes, contained in the Hebrew Bible, the author laments the meaninglessness of human life, views life as worse than death, and expresses antinatalistic sentiments towards coming into existence. These views were of primary focus in Gnosticism, an early religious movement in early Christianity and, to a lesser extent, Judaism, wherein the body is seen as a type of a "prison" for the soul and the world as a type of hell.

=== 19th-century Germany ===
The 19th-century German philosopher Arthur Schopenhauer was the first philosopher who constructed an entire philosophical system, where he presented an explanation of the world through metaphysics, aesthetics, epistemology, and ethics—all connected with a pessimistic view of the world. Schopenhauer viewed the world as having two sides: Will and representation. Will is pure striving: aimless, incessant, and with no end; it is the inner essence of all things. Representation is how humans as organisms view the world with their particular perceptual and cognitive endowment; it is how humans build objects from their perceptions.

In living creatures, the Will takes the form of the will to live: self-preservation or the survival instinct appearing as striving to satisfy desires. Since this will to life is humans' inner nature, they are doomed to be always dissatisfied, as one satisfied desire makes room for striving for yet another object of desire. There is, however, something humans can do with that ceaseless willing: take temporary respite during aesthetic contemplation or through cultivating a moral attitude. Humans can also defeat the will to live more permanently through asceticism, achieving equanimity.

=== 20th and 21st centuries ===
In the 20th and 21st centuries, a number of thinkers have revisited and revitalized philosophical pessimism—drawing in large part from the works of Arthur Schopenhauer and his contemporaries. For these writers, pessimism offers a new metaphysical and ethical perspective from which a contemporary critique of existence might be mounted. Notable 20th- and 21st-century authors who espoused philosophically pessimistic views include Emil Cioran, Peter Wessel Zapffe, Eugene Thacker, Thomas Ligotti, David Benatar, Drew M. Dalton, and Julio Cabrera.

== Main arguments ==
The most common arguments for the tenets of philosophical pessimism are briefly presented here.

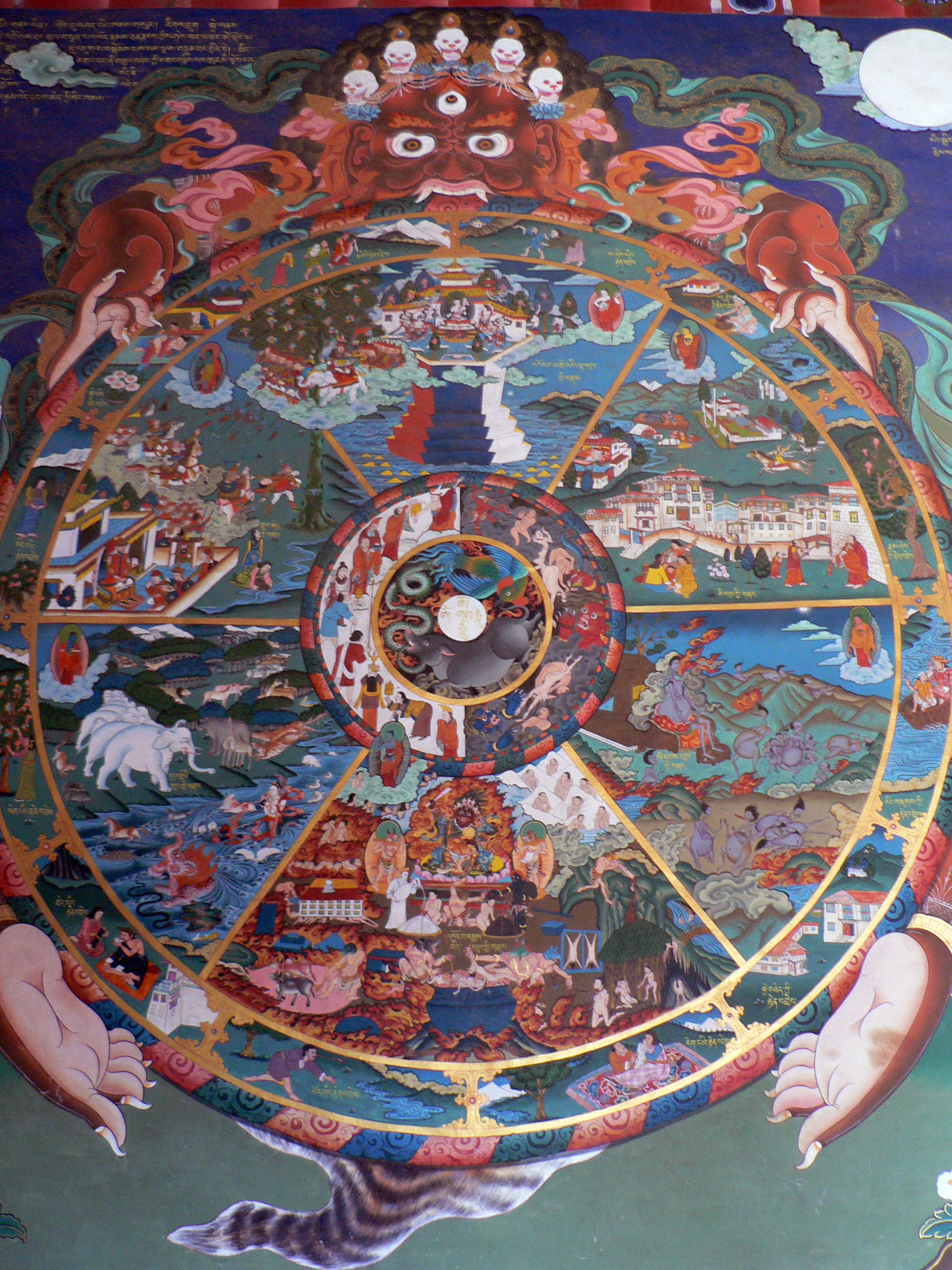
The Bhavachakra, or Wheel of Life, visually represents the cycle of birth, death, and rebirth (saṃsāra) in Buddhism, illustrating the interconnectedness of the three marks of existence: duḥkha (suffering or unsatisfactoriness), anattā (non-self), and anicca (impermanence).

=== Three marks of existence ===
According to Buddhism, continual dissatisfaction (duḥkha) is an intrinsic mark of sentient existence. All living creatures are subject to the sufferings of birth, aging, sickness and death; they desire what they do not have, seek to avoid what they find disagreeable, and feel loss when valued things and states pass away. This pattern of craving (taṇhā) is treated as a central source of suffering, grounded not only in external circumstances but also in ingrained tendencies such as greed, lust, envy and self-indulgence.

In Buddhism, the concept of duḥkha is closely related to the other two marks of existence: anattā (non-self) and anicca (impermanence). Anattā denies any permanent, unchanging self, holding instead that what is taken to be a "self" is a shifting collection of physical and mental processes. Insight into this lack of a fixed self is said to illuminate duḥkha, because attachment to an imagined, enduring self is taken to reinforce suffering.

Anicca, or impermanence, means that all conditioned things are in constant flux. Everything a person experiences, including pleasure and joy, is transient. On this view, clinging to experiences, roles or identities is bound to lead to disappointment and renewed suffering when they alter or cease.

Taken together, these three marks of existence depict ordinary life as unstable and unsatisfactory. Because liberation or nirvana is defined in contrast to this condition, some interpreters have regarded the Buddhist teachings on duḥkha, anattā and anicca as offering a broadly pessimistic diagnosis of existence, even if such doctrines also set out a path of practice and insight. On this reading, the value of continuing to exist in saṃsāra (the endless cycle of death and rebirth) is rejected, and this rejection is taken to be as self-evident as the rejection of suffering itself; accordingly, actions that reduce one's suffering or the suffering of other beings, are valued. Liberation from suffering is the central goal of Buddhist philosophy and ethics.

=== Critique of pleasure ===
A number of philosophers have put forward criticisms of pleasure, essentially denying that it adds anything positive to our well-being above the neutral state.

A particular strand of criticism of pleasure goes as far back as to Plato, who said that most of the pleasures we experience are forms of relief from pain, and that the unwise confuse the neutral painless state with happiness. Epicurus pushed this idea to its limit, and claimed that "[t]he limit of the greatness of the pleasures is the removal of everything which can give pain". As such, according to Epicureans, one can not be better off than being free from pain, anxiety, distress, fear, irritation, regret, worry, etc. — in the state of tranquillity.

Schopenhauer maintained that only pain is positive, that is, only pain is directly felt — it is experienced as something which is immediately added to our consciousness. On the other hand, pleasure is only ever negative, which means it only takes away something already present in our experience, such as a desire or discomfort. This constitutes his negativity thesis — that pleasure is only ever a relief from pain. Later German pessimists — Julius Bahnsen, Eduard von Hartmann, and Philipp Mainländer — held very similar views. According to Schopenhauer, one way to remove pain is to satisfy a desire; since to strive is to suffer, once a desire is satisfied, suffering momentarily ceases. Expanding on this idea, other thinkers suggest that cravings arise when we focus on external objects or perceive something undesirable in our current situation. These cravings create a visceral need to alter the state of affairs. In contrast, the absence of such cravings leads to a state of contentment or tranquillity, characterized by a lack of urgency to change one's experience.

A stronger version of this view is that there may be no undisturbed states. It is at least plausible that in every state we could notice some dissatisfactory quality such as tiredness, irritation, boredom, loneliness, regret, worry, discomfort, etc. Instead of neutral states, there may simply be "default" states — states with recurrent but minor frustrations and displeasures that, over time, we got used to and learned not to do anything about. Certain thinkers argue that positive experiences are conceptually and empirically difficult to establish as truly distinct or as opposites to negative experiences. (Note: They emphasize that what we often perceive as "better" experiences can be explained as the absence of particular discomforts, rather than the presence of something intrinsically positive. A theoretical model with only negative and neutral states is simpler and more coherent. Similarly, the notion of genuinely positive states can be challenged by suggesting that no experience clearly qualifies as an experiential opposite to suffering. This perspective also questions the coherence of the idea of opposites in experience, proposing instead that contrasting states (like hot and cold) exist on separate axes without being true opposites. Together, these perspectives support the view that the reduction or absence of negative states, rather than the pursuit of positive ones, is a more tenable framework for understanding the value of experiences.)

=== Life contains uncompensated evils ===
One argument for the negative view on life is the recognition that evils are unconditionally unacceptable. A good life is not possible with evils in it. This line of thinking is based on Schopenhauer's statement that "the ill and evil in the world... even if they stood in the most just relation to each other, indeed even if they were far outweighed by the good, are nevertheless things that should absolutely never exist in any way, shape or form" in The World as Will and Representation. The idea here is that no good can ever erase the experienced evils, because they are of a different quality or kind of importance.

Schopenhauer elaborates on the vital difference between the good and the bad, saying that "it is fundamentally beside the point to argue whether there is more good or evil in the world: for the very existence of evil already decides the matter since it can never be cancelled out by any good that might exist alongside or after it, and cannot therefore be counterbalanced", and adding that, "even if thousands had lived in happiness and delight, this would never annul the anxiety and tortured death of a single person; and my present well-being does just as little to undo my earlier suffering."

One way of interpreting the argument is by focusing on how one thing could compensate another. The goods can only compensate the evils, when they a) happen to the same subject, and b) happen at the same time. The reason why the good has to happen to the same subject is because the miserable cannot feel the happiness of the joyful, and hence it has no effect on him. The reason why the good has to happen at the same time is because the future joy does not act backwards in time, and so it has no effect on the present state of the suffering individual. But these conditions are not being met, and hence life is not worth living. Here, it doesn't matter whether there are any genuine positive pleasures, because since pleasures and pains are experientially separated, the evils are left unrepaid.

Another interpretation of the negativity thesis — that goods are merely negative in character — uses metaphors of debt and repayment, and crime and punishment. Here, merely ceasing an evil does not count as paying it off, just like stopping committing a crime does not amount to making amends for it. The bad can only be compensated by something positively good, just like a crime has to be answered for by some punishment, or a debt has to be paid off by something valuable. If the good is merely taking away an evil, then it cannot compensate for the bad since it is not of the appropriate kind — it is not a positive thing that could "repay the debt" of the bad.

=== Suffering is essential to life because of perpetual striving ===
Arthur Schopenhauer introduces an a priori argument for pessimism. The basis of the argument is the recognition that sentient organisms — animals — are embodied and inhabit specific niches in the environment. They struggle for their self-preservation; striving to satisfy wants is the essence of all organic life. But all striving, Schopenhauer argues, involves suffering. Thus, he concludes that suffering is unavoidable and inherent to existence. Given this, he says that the balance of good and bad is on the whole negative.

There are a couple of reasons why suffering is a fundamental aspect of life:

1. Satisfaction is elusive: organisms strive towards various things all the time. Whenever they satisfy one desire, they want something else and the striving begins anew.
2. Happiness is negative: while needs come to us seemingly out of themselves, we have to exert ourselves in order to experience some degree of joy. Moreover, pleasure is only ever a satisfaction—or elimination—of a particular desire. Therefore, it is only a negative experience as it temporarily takes away a striving or need.
3. Striving is suffering: as long as striving is not satisfied, it is being experienced as suffering.
4. Boredom is suffering: the lack of an object of desire is experienced as a discomforting state.

=== Asymmetry between harms and benefits ===
David Benatar, a South African philosopher at the University of Cape Town, argues that there is a significant difference between lack/presence of harms and benefits when comparing a situation when a person exists with a situation when said person never exists. The starting point of the argument is the following noncontroversial observation:
1. The presence of pain is bad.
2. The presence of pleasure is good.
However, the symmetry breaks when we consider the absence of pain and pleasure:
3. The absence of pain is good, even if that good is not enjoyed by anyone.
4. The absence of pleasure is not bad unless there is somebody for whom this absence is a deprivation.

Based on the above, Benatar infers the following:

- the absence of pain is better in the case where a person never exists than the presence of pain where a person does exist,
- the absence of pleasure is not worse in the case where a person never exists than the presence of pleasure where a person does exists.

In short, the absence of pain is good, while the absence of pleasure is not bad. From this it follows that not coming into existence has advantages over coming into existence for the one who would be affected by coming into the world. This is the cornerstone of his argument for antinatalism — the view that coming into existence is bad and hence that bringing other beings into existence is morally wrong.

=== Empirical differences between the pleasures and pains in life ===
To further support his case for pessimism, Benatar mentions a series of empirical differences between the pleasures and pains in life. In a strictly temporal aspect, the most intense pleasures that can be experienced are short-lived (e.g. orgasms), whereas the most severe pains can be much more enduring, lasting for days, months, and even years. The worst pains that can be experienced are also worse in quality or magnitude than the best pleasures are good, offering as an example the thought experiment of whether one would accept "an hour of the most delightful pleasures in exchange for an hour of the worst tortures".

In addition to citing Schopenhauer, who made a similar argument, when asking his readers to "compare the feelings of the animal that devours another with those of the one being devoured"; Benatar posits further challenges by wanting us to contrast the amount of time it may take for one's desires to be fulfilled, with some of our desires never being satisfied; the quickness with which one's body can be injured, damaged, or fall ill, and the comparative slowness of recovery, with full recovery sometimes never being attained; the existence of chronic pain, but the comparative non-existence of chronic pleasure; the effortless way in which the bad things in life naturally come to us, and the efforts one needs to muster in order to ward them off and obtain the good things. To these stark disparities, he adds points about the lack of a cosmic or transcendent meaning to human life as a whole and the gradual and inevitable physical and mental decline to which every life is subjected through the process of aging.

Benatar concludes that, even if one argues that the bad things in life are in some sense necessary for human beings to appreciate the good things in life, or at least to appreciate them fully, he asserts that it is not clear that this appreciation requires as much bad as there is, and that our lives are worse than they would be if the bad things were not in such sense necessary.

Human life would be vastly better if pain were fleeting and pleasure protracted; if the pleasures were much better than the pains were bad; if it were really difficult to be injured or get sick; if recovery were swift when injury or illness did befall us; and if our desires were fulfilled instantly and if they did not give way to new desires. Human life would also be immensely better if we lived for many thousands of years in good health and if we were much wiser, cleverer, and morally better than we are.

=== Entropy, decay and terminality ===
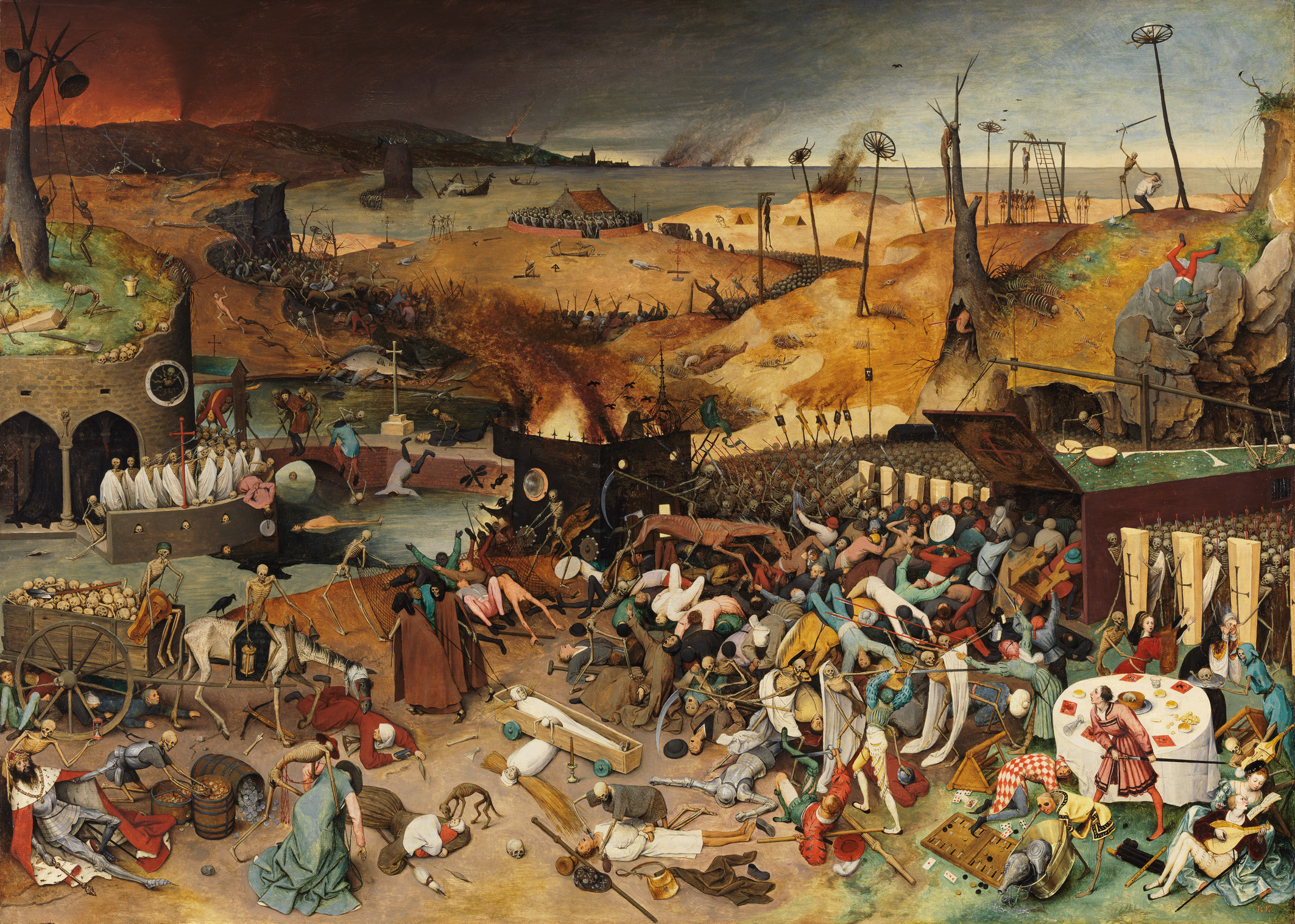
The Triumph of Death by Pieter Bruegel the Elder (c. 1562). For Philipp Mainländer, God's suicide originated the world and, with it, the metaphysical or cosmological telos of the will to death, which makes it so that everything in existence, both organic and inorganic, is destined to perish as God's "rotting cadaver".

Julio Cabrera, Philipp Mainländer, and Drew M. Dalton have explored the concepts of entropy, decay, and terminality in existence, particularly in the context of the collective conflict that such features embedded within life imply for living beings, as well as the eventual and ultimate obliteration of the totality of existence itself.

==== Structural terminality of human life ====
Julio Cabrera, an Argentine philosopher living in Brazil, presents an ontology in which human life has a structurally negative value. On this view, discomfort is not provoked in humans due to the particular events that happen in the lives of individuals, but due to the very nature of human existence. He posits that human beings are inherently subject to deterioration, with their existence being in constant decay since conception. To counteract this decline and its accompanying three types of friction — physical pain, discouragement (from mild boredom to serious depression), and social aggression — human beings create positive values (aesthetic, religious, entertaining) that are fleeting and ultimately palliative, as they do not arise from the structure of life itself, but must be introduced into life with effort to lessen suffering. However, this pursuit of positive values gives rise to the phenomenon of moral impediment, wherein individuals inadvertently harm others in their struggle to create meaning in a decaying existence.

==== "Will to death" as a drive towards cosmic annihilation ====
Philipp Mainländer, a 19th-century German philosopher and one of the post-Schopenhauerian pessimists, introduces the concept of the "will to death", which he posits as the fundamental metaphysical principle of existence. Mainländer asserts that the world, as a product of God's self-sacrifice, (Note: In Mainländer's naturalistic philosophy, "God" is a metaphor for a kind of initial singularity from which the expansion of the universe began.) is His "rotting corpse". (Note: Thacker writes: "God doesn't die accidentally, but kills himself. In this 'self-cadaverization of God,' Mainländer suggests that the world, life, our very selves, are all the rotting residue of God's suicide.") and that the ultimate aim or telos of everything that exists is to finally exterminate itself. In this view, the plurality and diversity of individual wills within existence, through their pursuit towards life (that is to say, their will to life), struggle against and consume each other, thereby hastening God's original pursuit of non-being. According to Mainländer, the best understanding we can gain of the nature of existence is as a drive toward cosmic annihilation which has been "slowed down" through organic and living processes — life is something, in other words, that appears as a purely transitory phase in the accomplishment of the world's absolute oblivion, as every living being, from plants, animals, and, finally, humans, inexorably perishes and ceases to be — no matter how intense their will to life may appear to be at an initial and superficial glance "The whole universe", he writes in summation, "moves from being to non-being, continually weakening its power, [and therefore] has an end: it is not endless, but leads to a pure absolute nothingness — to a nihil negativum".

Mainländer's scientific pessimism builds on the foundations laid by Schopenhauer, yet he diverges from them by emphasizing that a "true philosophy" must be grounded in immanent or empirical reality, thus rejecting any appeal to transcendent or spiritual realms (such as Schopenhauer's view that there is one unifying Will in reality, which, being the thing-in-itself, is the timeless, undifferentiated, and acausal principle of being). He argues that the natural sciences provide the best foundation for understanding existence, revealing that the totality of reality is in fact composed of diverse individual wills, each striving to live while simultaneously and ultimately contributing to the demise and decay of others.

==== "Unbecoming" of the world through entropic decay ====
Drew M. Dalton, an American philosopher and a professor of English at Indiana University, expands on these themes by grounding them in contemporary scientific understanding, particularly through the lens of entropy as outlined in the second law of thermodynamics and the contemporary mathematical sciences. He argues that the universe is characterized by entropic decay, where all matter and energy are in a constant state of dissipation, and being itself is in a process of "unbecoming". Dalton posits that everything that exists is not only destined to disintegrate but is also actively working toward this end. He describes existence as an "annihilative machine," where every being contributes to its own destruction and the destruction of others — and, indeed, to the destruction of being itself (that is to say, the destruction of everything that is living or non-living, organic or inorganic). This entropic nature of reality implies that existence is fundamentally antagonistic to itself, requiring beings to maintain themselves at the expense of others within a "metaphysics of decay".

=== Valuelessness of mere existence ===
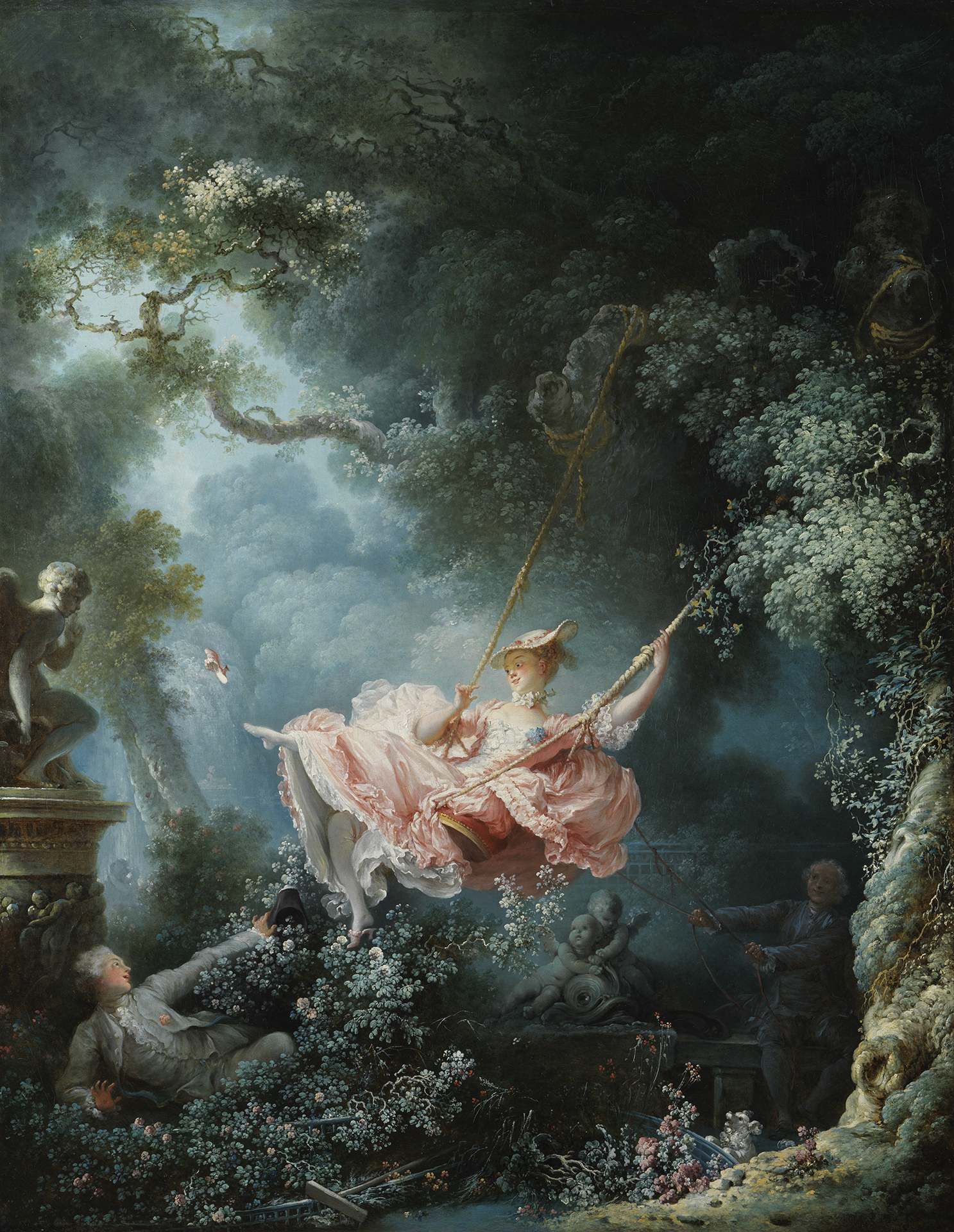
The Swing by Jean-Honoré Fragonard (1767). For Pascal, Schopenhauer and Cabrera, the need for entertainment or diversion is a constant element in human life — without which existence reveals itself to us as hollow and devoid of value.

Blaise Pascal, Arthur Schopenhauer and Julio Cabrera sustain that mere existence itself lacks intrinsic value.

Cabrera argues that all pleasure derives from external "estantes" (contingent supports or distractions found within the world) rather than from being itself. He illustrates this through the experience of solitary confinement, where a prisoner, stripped of all distractions, is left completely alone with their pure being. This state reveals the profound suffering associated with bare existence; if being were inherently valuable, such isolation would not constitute a severe form of torture. Instead, the overwhelming pain and despair experienced in such an extreme form of solitude accentuates the notion that humans constantly require external values and diversions to find meaning in life.

Cabrera further contends that life is often viewed as a means to an end rather than an end in itself. Moral philosophers recognize that mere survival, devoid of purpose or fulfillment, is often seen as a miserable way of living. This perspective suggests an inherent understanding that being itself does not confer positive value; rather, it is a possible engagement with the world that may imbue life with meaning. The torturous conditions of confinement, where individuals are left with nothing but their mere existence, exemplify this lack of intrinsic worth.

Schopenhauer echoes these sentiments, asserting that if existence held any positive value in itself, boredom would simply not exist; mere being would suffice for us and we should have no need for anything else. Instead, humans find fleeting satisfaction only through striving for goals or engaging in intellectual or artistic pursuits, which momentarily distract them from the inherent vacuity of existence. When, however, confronted with the reality of sheer existence, the emptiness of life becomes painfully apparent.

Blaise Pascal, a French philosopher from the 17th century, also addresses this theme of diversion, suggesting that humans engage in various distractions to avoid confronting the deeper questions of existence and the suffering that accompanies self-awareness. In his work Pensées, Pascal argues that people often seek entertainment and social interaction as a means to escape the anxiety and existential dread that arise from an awareness of their finitude. He encapsulates this idea in a famous maxim: "All the unhappiness of men arises from one single fact, that they cannot stay quietly in their own chamber."

=== Meaninglessness of life ===
David Benatar acknowledges that while we can derive meaning from terrestrial perspectives — through acts of kindness, creativity, and societal contributions — these meanings are terrestrially limited and do not confer cosmic significance. He emphasizes that sentient life as a whole is irredeemably senseless from a cosmic perspective, with our existences having no impact whatsoever on the broader universe. The evolution of life, including human life, is a product of blind physical and chemical forces and serves no apparent purpose.

Similarly, Peter Wessel Zapffe, a Norwegian philosopher from the 20th century, articulates a profound sense of existential despair rooted in the nature of human interests and the limitations of our earthly existence. In his work On the Tragic, Zapffe categorizes human interests into four types: biological, social, autotelic, and metaphysical. While biological and social interests pertain to survival and relationships, it is the metaphysical interests — our yearning for justice and meaning — that Zapffe considers most significant. He argues that while we may find temporary satisfaction in autotelic pursuits, these do not provide a sufficient foundation for life's overarching meaning. Ultimately, he concludes that life is meaningless because it cannot be externally justified, as our earthly environment fails to fulfill our metaphysical interests (in other words, life lacks a heterotelic source of meaning and justice, which would be outside of life itself and thus independent of humans' efforts). The consciousness of death further worsens this sense of futility by revealing the transient nature of our endeavors and stripping life of enduring significance.

== Responses to the evils of existence ==
Philosophers who adopt a pessimistic outlook have proposed different ways of responding to what they regard as the suffering and misery of life.

=== Noble Eightfold Path ===
Buddhism sets out a response to what it sees as the ills of existence through the doctrine of the Four Noble Truths and the Noble Eightfold Path. The Four Noble Truths analyse suffering (dukkha), its origin in craving and attachment, the possibility of its cessation (nirvana), and the way leading to this cessation. The Noble Eightfold Path is presented as a procedure of ethical and mental training, usually described in terms of right view, right intention, right speech, right action, right livelihood, right effort, right mindfulness and right concentration. According to Buddhist thinkers, following this path can cultivate wisdom and compassion, reduce suffering, and lead towards a state of inner peace.

=== Schopenhauer's renunciation of the will to life ===
Arthur Schopenhauer regarded his philosophy not only as a condemnation of existence, but also as a doctrine of salvation that allows one to counteract the suffering that comes from the will to life and attain tranquillity. According to Schopenhauer, suffering comes from willing (striving, desiring). One's willing is proportional to one's focus on oneself, one's needs, fears, individuality, etc. So, Schopenhauer reasons, to interrupt suffering, one has to interrupt willing. And to diminish willing, one has to diminish the focus on oneself. This can be accomplished in multiple ways.

==== Aesthetic contemplation ====
According to Schopenhauer, aesthetic contemplation means the focused appreciation of a piece of art, music, or even an idea, with such contemplation being both disinterested and impersonal. It is disinterested — one's interests give way to a devotion to the object; the object is considered as an end in itself. And it is also impersonal — not constrained by one's own likes and dislikes. Aesthetic appreciation evokes a universal idea of an object, rather than the perception of the object as unique.

During that time, for Schopenhauer, one "loses oneself" in the object of contemplation, and the sense of individuation temporarily dissolves. This is because the universality of the object of contemplation passes onto the subject. One's consciousness becomes will-less. One becomes — if only for a brief moment — a neutral spectator or a "pure subject", unencumbered by one's own self, needs, and suffering.

Similarly, Schopenhauer argued that one way to get rid of suffering is to distract oneself from it. When we're not paying attention to what we lack — and hence, desire — we are temporarily at peace.

==== Compassionate moral outlook ====
For Schopenhauer, a proper moral attitude towards others comes from the recognition that the separation between living beings occurs only in the realm of representation, originating from the principium individuationis. Underneath the representational realm, we are all one. Each person is, in fact, the same Will — only manifested through different objectifications. The suffering of another being is thus our own suffering. The recognition of this metaphysical truth allows one to attain a more universal, rather than individualistic, consciousness. In such a universal consciousness, one relinquishes one's exclusive focus on one's own well-being and woe towards that of all other beings.

==== Asceticism ====
Schopenhauer explains that one may go through a transformative experience in which one recognizes that the perception of the world as being constituted of separate things, that are impermanent and constantly striving, is illusory. This can come about through knowledge of the workings of the world or through an experience of extreme suffering. One sees through the veil of Maya. This means that one no longer identifies oneself as a separate individual. Rather, one recognizes himself as all things. One sees the source of all misery — the Will as the thing-in-itself, which is the kernel of all reality. One can then change one's attitude to life towards that of the renunciation of the will to life and practice self-denial (not giving in to desires).

For Schopenhauer, the person who attains this state of mind lives their life in complete peace and equanimity. They are not bothered by desires or lack; they accept everything as it is. This path of redemption, Schopenhauer argues, is more permanent, since it is grounded in a profound recognition that changes one's attitude; it is not merely a fleeting moment as in the case of an aesthetic experience.

However, the ascetic way of life, according to him, is not available for everyone — only a few rare and heroic individuals may be able to live as ascetics and attain such a state. More importantly, Schopenhauer explains that asceticism requires virtue; and virtue can be cultivated but not taught.

=== Humor and laughter ===
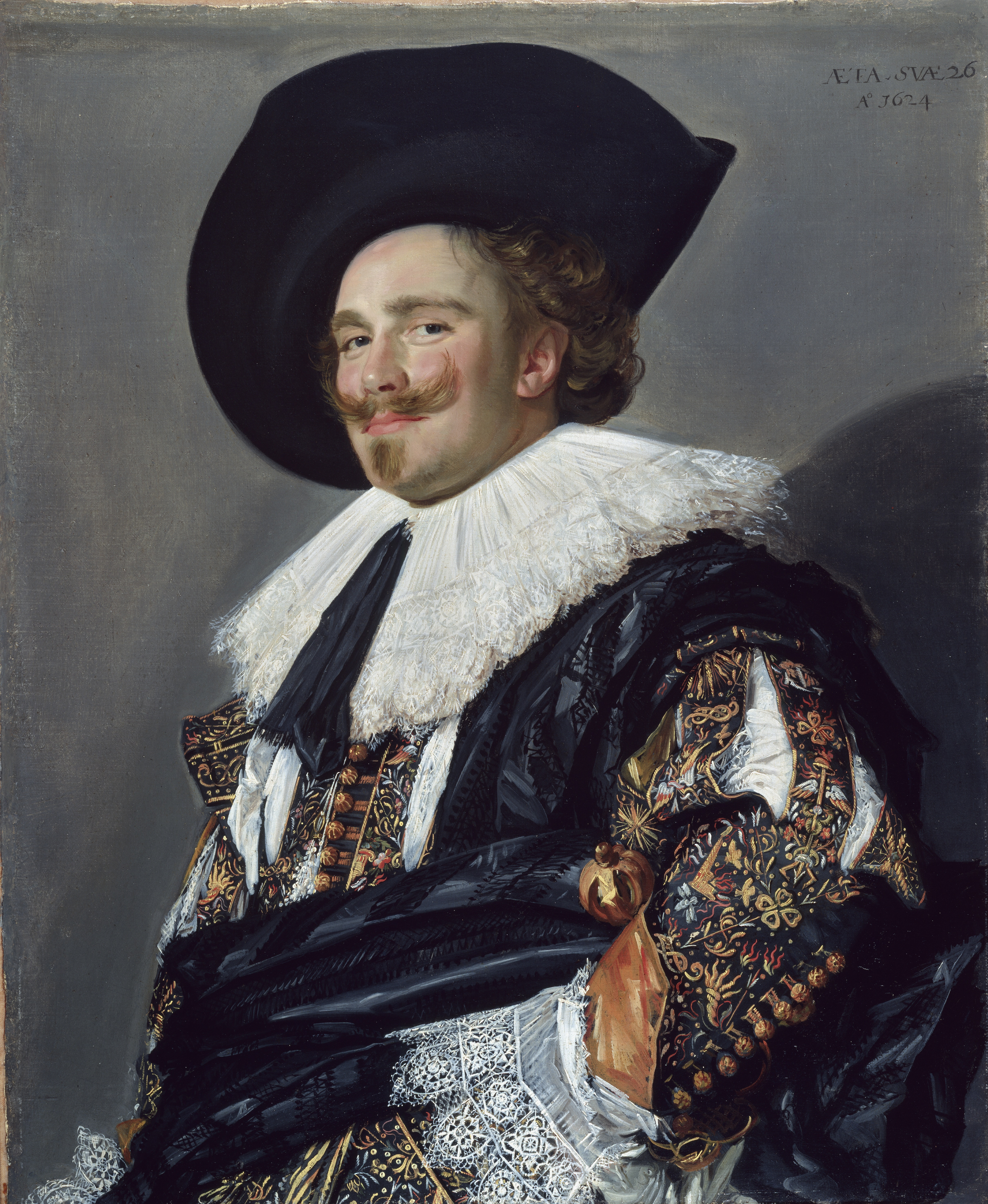
The Laughing Cavalier (1624), by Frans Hals. For Bahnsen, humor can provide a momentary escape from the moral difficulties of existence.

In his 1877 work Das Tragische als Weltgesetz und der Humor als ästhetische Gestalt des Metaphysischen ("The Tragical as World Law and Humor as Aesthetic Shape of the Metaphysical"), Julius Bahnsen, a 19th-century German philosopher as well as another of the post-Schopenhauerian pessimists, argues that tragedy is an inherent part of human existence — arising from the conflict between incommensurable moral values and duties.

For Bahnsen, the essence of tragedy lies in the recognition that the moral dilemmas of life do not contain within themselves clear or consistent solutions; that every action carries the weight of competing values and opposing conceptions of the good life, thus resulting in unavoidable moral transgressions. This, for Bahnsen, makes is so that — differing from Schopenhauer, von Hartmann and even Mainländer — there is no redemption from the tragedy of life; not through asceticism, aesthetic contemplation or even suicide. Due to our obligations and commitments towards others and to our communities as a whole, we cannot escape into another world or annihilate ourselves — we are thus inextricably caught within "the drama of the world".

Bahnsen, however, puts forward the idea that, despite there being no redemption or salvation from the moral tragedies inherent to life, there is something we can do to alleviate the burden of existence, which for him is humor and laughter. While they allow us to recognize our powerlessness towards our predicament, humor and laughter also permit us to stand above the moral impasses pressing down on us by momentarily abstracting ourselves from them.

=== Philipp Mainländer's political activism ===
Philipp Mainländer criticises what he sees as the moral quietism in Schopenhauer's philosophy and early Buddhism. He argues that although these systems may ease the suffering of individuals, they do little to address wider social injustices. In his view, such quietist approaches help to maintain inequality because they do not give those without social and material advantages the conditions needed for their own moral development. For Mainländer, a consistently pessimistic ethics should include both personal moral effort and a concern for social justice, so that everyone has access to the education and resources required to recognise what he takes to be the lack of value of life.

To respond to these inequalities, Mainländer calls for the removal of the social and political structures that, in his view, sustain them. He treats the pursuit of social and political equality as an extension of compassion, grounded in the judgement that existence is in itself evil. He supports communism and a "free love movement" (freie Liebe) as central elements of a just society, based on communal ownership and a shared responsibility to renounce the will to life. Through such a free love movement, Mainländer aims to change sexual and marital relations by releasing individuals from social pressures to marry and have children, so that they can follow a path of contemplation, compassion, chastity, and finally the renunciation of being through suicide. He presents suicide not as an act driven by despair, but as a rational decision which, when taken with a clear understanding of the nature of existence, can completely and quickly bring an end to one's suffering.

For Mainländer, communism is the main instrument for creating social and economic equality, removing class divisions and giving all people similar access to education and resources. In such a society, he believes that individuals would move beyond narrow self-interest and basic survival instincts, and would be more likely to show compassion and work together to reduce suffering. He presents this communist state as the penultimate stage in the will to death's metanarrative. Once all human desires have been satisfied, people would, in his view, come to see the vanity and emptiness of existence, and would judge that the pleasures linked to this satisfaction do not outweigh what he considers the negative value of existence. This recognition would then begin a process leading towards humanity's extinction, which he understands as matching the natural movement of all matter in the universe towards nothingness.

=== Von Hartmann's collective ending of all life ===
Eduard von Hartmann, much like Philipp Mainländer (one of his pessimist 19th-century German contemporaries), was also against all individualistic forms of the abolition of suffering, prominent in Buddhism and in Schopenhauer's philosophy, arguing that these approaches fail to address the problem of continued suffering for others. Instead, he opted for a collective solution: he believed that life progresses towards greater rationality — culminating in humankind — and that as humans became more educated and more intelligent, they would see through various illusions regarding the abolition of suffering, eventually realizing that the problem lies ultimately in existence itself.

Thus, humanity as a whole would recognize that the only way to end the suffering present in life is to end life itself. This would happen in the future, where people would have advanced technologically to a point where they could destroy the whole of nature. That, for von Hartmann, would be the ultimate negation of the Will by Reason.

=== Amor fati and eternal recurrence ===
Friedrich Nietzsche, a 19th-century German philosopher, advocated an unmitigated acceptance of existence through the concepts of amor fati and eternal recurrence. Amor fati, or "love of (one's) fate", encourages individuals to embrace their life experiences, including suffering and hardship, as essential components of their existence. Nietzsche posits that by affirming life in its entirety, one can transcend nihilism and find meaning even in adversity. The idea of eternal recurrence further encourages individuals to live as if they would have to relive their lives repeatedly, prompting a deep appreciation for each moment, and thus setting aside the goal of happiness as the ultimate aim of a human life.

In his 1942 essay The Myth of Sisyphus, the 20th-century French philosopher Albert Camus similarly presents a kind of "heroic pessimism"; that is to say, a perspective that resonates with Nietzsche's affirmation of life, particularly in the face of existential absurdity. While Nietzsche advocates for an unqualified acceptance of existence through the concepts of amor fati and eternal recurrence, Camus on the other hand makes use of Sisyphus's punishment as a metaphor for the human condition, likewise describing the importance of embracing life; even amidst its inherent struggles and absurdities.

=== Zapffe's defence mechanisms ===
Peter Wessel Zapffe viewed humans as animals with an overly developed consciousness who yearn for justice and meaning in a fundamentally meaningless and unjust universe — constantly struggling against feelings of existential dread as well as the knowledge of their own mortality. He identified four defence mechanisms that allow people to cope with disturbing thoughts about the nature of human existence:

1. Isolation: the troublesome facts of existence are simply repressed — they are not spoken about in public, and are not even thought about in private.
2. Anchoring: one fixates (anchors) oneself on cultural projects, religious beliefs, ideologies, etc.; and pursue goals appropriate to the objects of one's fixation. By dedicating oneself to a cause, one focuses one's attention on a specific value or ideal, thus achieving a communal or cultural sense of stability and safety from unsettling existential musings.
3. Distraction: through entertainment, career, status, etc., one distracts oneself from existentially disturbing thoughts. By constantly chasing for new pleasures, new goals, and new things to do, one is able to evade a direct confrontation against mankind's vulnerable and ill-fated situation in the cosmos.
4. Sublimation: artistic expression may act as a temporary means of respite from feelings of existential angst by transforming them into works of art that can be aesthetically appreciated from a distance.

=== Terror management theory ===
Terror management theory (TMT) postulates that awareness of mortality leads to existential fear, which individuals manage through cultural beliefs and ideologies. Rooted in Ernest Becker's The Denial of Death, TMT builds on his argument that the fear of death is a fundamental human concern driving much of our behavior. Becker posits that people deny their mortality by embracing cultural narratives and ideologies that imbue their lives with meaning and a sense of permanence. When faced with death's inevitability, individuals adopt symbolic worldviews — such as cultural, religious, or personal ideologies — to repress existential angst.

Thomas Ligotti, an American horror writer, draws parallels between TMT and Zapffe's philosophy, noting that both recognize humans' heightened self-awareness of mortality and the coping mechanisms this awareness necessitates. Zapffe argues that people shield themselves from existential despair by limiting consciousness, engaging in distractions, and constructing artificial meaning — a view that echoes Becker's analysis of how individuals use social and psychological strategies to manage their fear of death.

=== Biomedical enhancement ===
Peter Wessel Zapffe was skeptical of many forms of technological enhancements, viewing them primarily as superficial distractions that fail to address the deeper existential questions present in human life. He argued that while technology can meet basic biological needs, it does not resolve the inherent suffering and anxiety that characterize the human condition. From Zapffe's perspective, the current human baseline is itself in a "sick" state due to our overly developed awareness towards questions regarding metaphysical meaning and justice within existence, which challenges the traditional distinction between health and enhancement.

However, Zapffe does concede that biotechnology could, at least in theory, alter our metaphysical needs, and thus not be merely a tool for distraction. Ole Martin Moen argues that Zapffe's view therefore suggests that both extinction and successful enhancement would be preferable to the continuation of the current state of human existence, thereby strengthening the argument for pursuing biomedical enhancements, particularly those aimed at improving human welfare.

Zapffe also points out that, due to our intellect as humans, we are able to comprehend "the brotherhood of suffering between everything alive". In a related vein, British philosopher David Pearce advocates for the application of biomedical enhancement not only to humans but also to non-human animals. Pearce argues that a long-term goal should be to redesign ecosystems and rewrite the vertebrate genome to eliminate suffering across all sentient beings. He posits that advancements in technology could eventually enable humanity to significantly reduce suffering in nature, thereby addressing the broader ethical implications of suffering beyond human existence.

=== Antinatalism and extinction ===
==== Schopenhauer and antinatalism ====
Some scholars link Schopenhauer to antinatalism and David Benatar. Schopenhauer says that anyone who could have looked at life before being born would reply "no thank you very much" to the offer of coming into existence; that "life is a business that does not cover its costs"; and that if people were rational they would not have children:

One should try to imagine that the act of procreation were neither a need, nor accompanied by sexual pleasure, but instead a matter of pure, rational reﬂection; could the human race even continue to exist? Would not everyone, on the contrary, have so much compassion for the coming generation that he would rather spare it the burden of existence, or at least refuse to take it upon himself to cold-bloodedly impose it on them?

Some of Schopenhauer's views, however, conflict with core tenets of antinatalism. The duty to refrain from procreation, for example, is incompatible with his rejection of any unconditional moral "ought". He sees individual human beings as mere appearances of the eternal metaphysical Will, who therefore do not truly come into existence upon birth. Similarly, dying does not lead to annihilation, so, at a fundamental level, non-existence is unattainable. Furthermore, he believes that, by preventing someone from existing as a person, one prevents them from understanding the world's essence, that is, the Will, and negating it afterwards; this denial of the Will is regarded by Schopenhauer as the "highest good" (summum bonum), and is therefore something that may be interpreted as better than non-existence.

==== Anthropocentric antinatalism ====
Some pessimists prescribe abstention from procreation as the best response to the ills of life. A person can only do so much to secure oneself from suffering or help others in need. The best course of action, they argue, is not to bring others into a world where discomfort is guaranteed.

Additionally, some of them take into consideration a scenario where humanity decides not to continue to exist, but instead chooses to go down the route of phased extinction. The resulting extinction of the human species would not be regrettable but a good thing. They go as far as to prescribe non-procreation as the morally right — or even obligatory — course of action. Zapffe conveys this position through the words of the titular Last Messiah: "Know yourselves – be infertile and let the earth be silent after ye".

Andrea Sauchelli argues that there are certain types of evils which are so great that no amount of any goods can counterbalance them. That is, a state of affairs with such an evil is always bad, no matter what goods there are. We live in a world where such "supreme evils" are exacted by humans and endured by humans. Often, entire groups of people perpetuate such atrocities on a large scale. Based on that, Sauchelli makes the case that we have a collective duty to prevent such evils, and arguably one of the most effective ways of doing that is through humanity bringing about its own extinction by stopping procreation. If this is the case, then everyone has a duty to not procreate.

==== Sentiocentric antinatalism ====
Antinatalism can be extended to non-human animals. Benatar asserts that his argument for antinatalism "applies not only to humans but also to all other sentient beings" and that "coming into existence harms all sentient beings". He reinforces his view when discussing extinction by saying "it would be better, all things considered, if there were no more people (and indeed no more conscious life)."

It can be argued that since we have a prima facie obligation to help humans in need, and preventing future humans from coming into existence is helping them, and there is no justification for treating animals worse, we have a similar obligation to animals living in the wild. That is, we should also help alleviate their suffering and introduce certain interventions to prevent them from coming into the world — a position which would be called "wildlife anti-natalism".

Julio Cabrera recognizes that non-human animals go through a lot of suffering throughout their life, but because they are not failing as moral beings (as they are not moral beings to begin with), there is no "procreation problem" or reason to adopt an antinatalist stance toward them.

=== Suicide ===
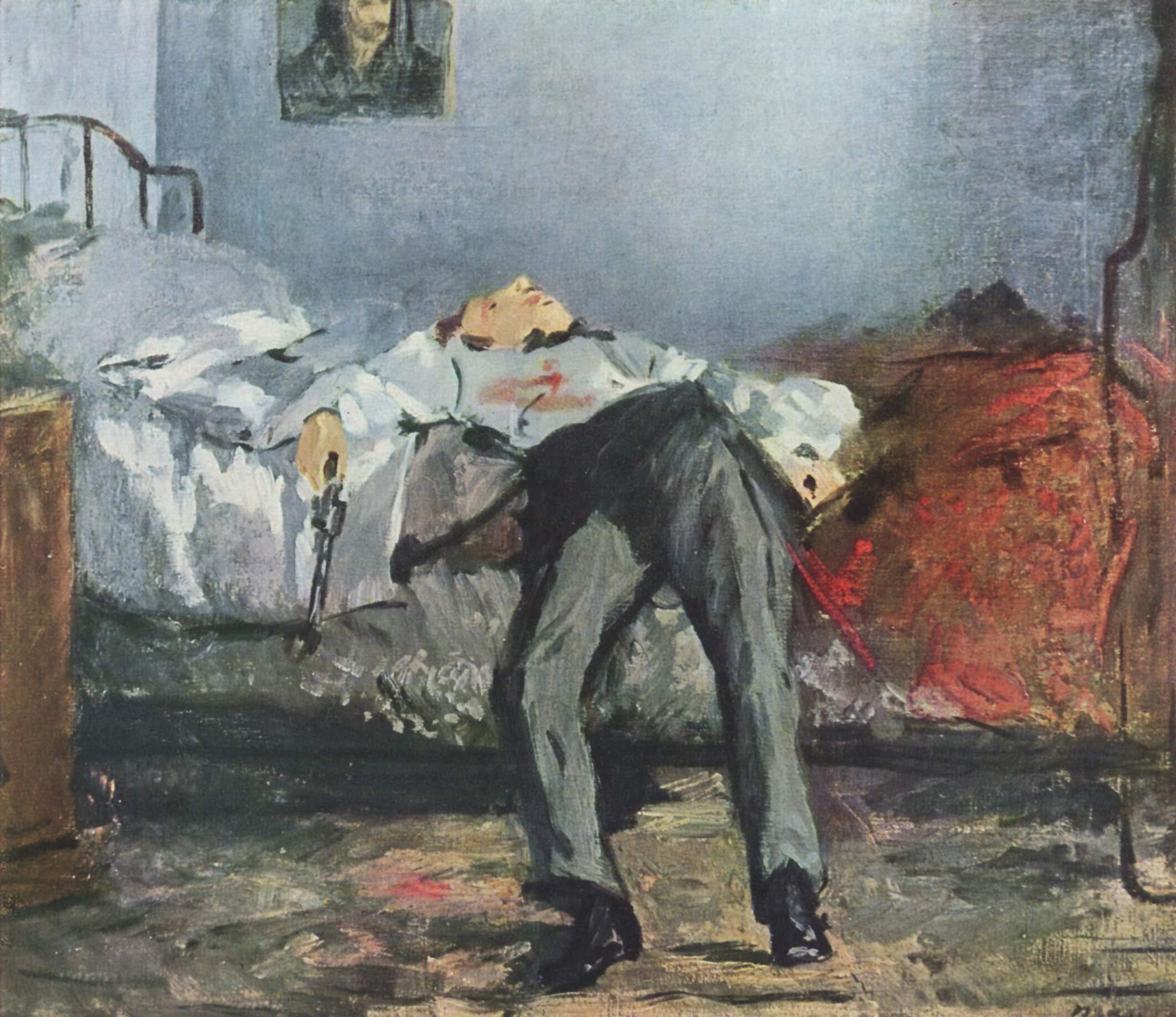
Le Suicidé (c. 1877–1881), by Edouard Manet.

Most 19th century pessimists (notably, with the exception of Philipp Mainländer) rejected suicide and provided arguments against it: they usually argued that suicide is immoral or that it doesn't lead to intended effects. It was a philosophical alternative to the then-common emerging views that suicide is a psychological/medical pathology or a social issue.

Modern pessimists, including David Benatar and Julio Cabrera, argue that in some extreme situations, such as intense pain, terror, and slavery, people are morally justified to end their own lives. Although this will not resolve the human predicament, it may at the very least stop further suffering or moral degradation of the person in question.

==== Schopenhauer on suicide ====
Arthur Schopenhauer rejects condemnation of suicide stemming from religion, as well as those based on accusations of cowardice or insanity regarding the person who decides to end their own life. But these objections, he contends, are based on prejudices rather than reason. He agrees with David Hume's numerous critiques of traditional objections to suicide.

Schopenhauer's view is that high rates of suicide, rather than speaking about moral failings of individuals, shows that there is something wrong with existence itself. Rather than blame those who commit suicide, we should be compassionate towards them — we should understand that someone may not be able to bear the sufferings present in their own life, and that one's own life is something that one has an indisputable right to.

For Schopenhauer, taking one's life is a mistake, for one still would like to live, but simply in better conditions. The suicidal person still desires goods in life: a "person who commits suicide stops living precisely because he cannot stop willing". It is not one's own individual life that is the source of one's suffering, but the Will — the ceaselessly striving nature of existence. The mistake is in annihilating an individual life, and not the Will itself. The Will cannot be negated by ending one's life, so it is not a solution to the sufferings embedded in existence itself.

Suicide would be a missed opportunity for real redemption. Instead, Schopenhauer argues for using one's suffering to fully recognize the essence of existence as ceaseless striving, which then leads to will turning against itself and withering away. The person in question no longer sees anything worth striving for and stops willing altogether and is directed towards death naturally through starvation (ascetic or saintly suicide).

This ascetic route was criticized by Friedrich Nietzsche as also ultimately illusory and contradictory: the ascetic is constantly willing something, up to the point of willing nothing, but it is still a form of willing.

==== Eduard von Hartmann on suicide ====
Eduard von Hartmann criticized Schopenhauer's alternative to suicide, as it still focused on the individual, even though fundamentally existence is unified, so, such ascetic mortification is even more foolish than normal suicides as it only prolongs suffering, while reaching the same end result.

Von Hartmann argued against the practice of suicide on moral grounds. For him, every self-serving action is morally wrong, and because suicide does not take into account obligations towards other people but is strictly driven by egoistic considerations it is immoral. Suicide does not benefit the social group but actually harms it. This sentiment was shared by Olga Plümacher.

==== Benatar on suicide ====
David Benatar considers many objections against suicide, such as it being a violation of the sanctity of human life, a violation of the person's right to life, being unnatural, or being a cowardly act, to be unconvincing. The only relevant considerations that should be taken into account in the matter of suicide are those regarding people to whom we hold some special obligations. Such as, for example, our family members. In general, for Benatar the question of suicide is more a question of dealing with the particular miseries of one's life, rather than a moral problem per se. Consequently, he argues that, in certain situations, suicide is not only morally justified but is also a rational course of action.

Benatar's arguments regarding the poor quality of human life do not lead him to the conclusion that death is generally preferable to the continuation of life. But they do serve to clarify why there are cases in which one's continued existence would be worse than death, as they make it explicit that suicide is justified in a greater variety of situations than we would normally grant. Every person's situation is different, and the question of the rationality of suicide must be considered from the perspective of each particular individual — based on their own hardships and prospects regarding the future.

Jiwoon Hwang argued that the hedonistic interpretation of David Benatar's axiological asymmetry of harms and benefits entails promortalism — the view that it is always preferable to cease to exist than to continue to live. Hwang argues that the absence of pleasure is not bad in the following cases: for the one who never exists, for the one who exists, and for the one who ceased to exist. By "bad", we mean that it is not worse than the presence of pleasure for the one who exists. This is consistent with Benatar's statement that the presence of pleasure for the existing person is not an advantage over the absence of pleasure for the never existing and vice versa.

==== Cabrera on suicide ====
Julio Cabrera argues that the antinatalist literature usually assumes an exclusively hedonistic perspective according to which the physical and psychological sufferings present in life make it not worth starting. For Cabrera, however, life is problematic also due to containing significant moral sufferings: for each social circumstance, it is very difficult for humans to always be ethical with all others involved. He says that — due to the structural terminality of human existence — the more we continue living, the longer we will be exposed to moral risks: such as the risk of procreating, manipulating or harming others, and of not being able to end our lives with moral dignity (in the sense of the burdens one places upon others in the process of one's death, and the inability to ask for their help in ending one's life without jeopardizing them ethically and/or legally). Cabrera identifies some reasons for why we might continue living: helping others, creating beautiful works, and not hurting our loved ones with our death; but ultimately considers them rather dubious.

More importantly, if we take seriously the pessimistic judgment of life as full of suffering, danger, moral failings, and the high cost of obtaining goods for ourselves, we see that, at the very least, the continuation of a life is ethically questionable. Cabrera cautions, however, against concluding that we should kill ourselves; because suicide too can be ethically problematic.

Rather, we should be open to the possibility of death by putting our lives at risk in dangerous situations if ethics demands so (e.g. in starvation protests, fights for liberation, caring for the sick during a contagion, etc.). Dying can be ethically advisable when we can no longer create positives values, or when continuing living would require us to violate the moral demands of not harming and not manipulating others. Cabrera also points out that dying is usually not a pleasant nor dignified experience, such that suicide is the only manner through which one may be able to die a "good death" . He writes, "If you want to die well, you must be the artist of your own death; nobody can replace you in that."

Cabrera criticizes other antinatalist philosophers, who postulate an asymmetry, where life is in general worth continuing but not worth starting. He says that this line of reasoning could weaken the antinatalist thesis that life is never worth starting; for if our lives are in general perfectly bearable, and sometimes even pleasant (such that they are worth continuing), then we could have a rational expectation that our children will also be able to create values that will make their lives worth living.

== Pessimism and other philosophical topics ==
=== Animals ===
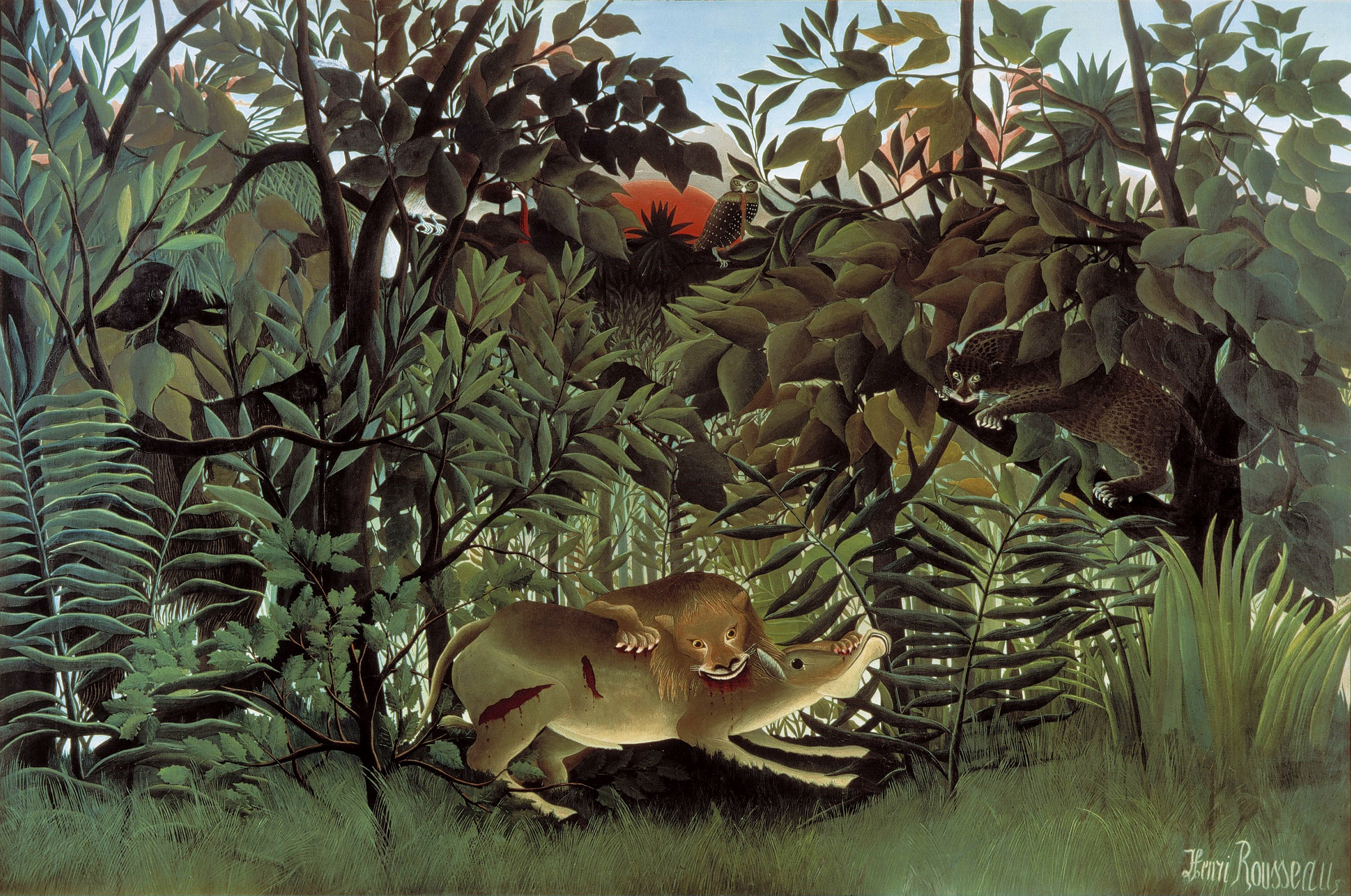
Henri Rousseau's The Hungry Lion Throws Itself on the Antelope (1905).

Aside from the human predicament, many philosophical pessimists also draw attention to what they regard as the predominantly negative quality of the lives of non-human animals and of sentient existence as a whole, and in this way they question the idea of nature as a "wise and benevolent" creator. Some philosophers refer to comments by the evolutionary biologist Richard Dawkins, who has spoken of the vast amount of apparently pointless suffering in the animal world and described it as "beyond all decent contemplation", and to Charles Darwin, one of the originators of the theory of evolution by natural selection, who rejected belief in a benevolent God in part because of the suffering of animals, who in his view do not gain any moral improvement from it.

Some authors speak of an "evolutionary pessimism" argument. They note that throughout hundreds of millions of years of evolutionary history there has been an immense amount of suffering, including physical pain, emotional distress, predation, parasitism, aggression, starvation, and disease. On this basis, they claim that the total negative value experienced by sentient beings is likely to be far greater than the total positive value. In order to balance this, a very large amount of good would have to arise in the future. Since such future goods are uncertain and may never be enough to compensate for this "evolutionary evil", these writers conclude that it is likely that it would have been better if evolution had never produced sentient beings at all.

Scholars working on the topic of Wild animal suffering argue that suffering in nature is widespread among many animal species. They note that many animals have large numbers of offspring, most of whom die at a young age, often in painful ways such as disease, predation, or exposure to harsh environmental conditions. Because these animals usually live only for a short time, they have few chances for positive experiences while facing many negative ones. Researchers also suggest that many of these offspring are already sentient at birth, so they can suffer from the moment they come into existence. On these grounds, these writers maintain that, for wild animals, suffering is likely to outweigh pleasure.

==== Giacomo Leopardi ====
Leopardi, an Italian philosopher and poet, portrays our lives as full of disappointments and adversities, essentially nullifying any goods we manage to secure. In his "Dialogue Between Nature and an Icelander", through the voice of the titular Icelandic character in the dialogue, Leopardi expresses deep concern over the immense suffering experienced by wild animals. He argues that Nature is inherently cruel, with animals constantly preying on and devouring one another in a relentless struggle for survival. The Icelandic character laments the "wretched life of the world" and "the suffering and death of all the beings which compose it", with no respite or escape from such universal torment.

Leopardi, through this character, rejects the idea that nature is benevolent or that wild animals live in a state of happiness and contentment. Instead, he portrays Nature as indifferent to the plight of its creatures, driven solely by the merciless laws of competition and the survival of the fittest. The Icelandic character pleads with Nature to show compassion and alleviate the suffering of both humans and wild animals — but Nature remains unmoved, defending its cruel ways as a necessary part of the natural order. The core of his pessimism lies in his rejection of the necessity of predation in life and the rejection of the value of the cycle of destruction and regeneration.

==== Arthur Schopenhauer ====
Schopenhauer's philosophical pessimism also extended to his views on animals. He believed that animals, like humans, are subject to the metaphysical Will and therefore also experience suffering and craving. As a result, he argued that animals should be treated with respect and compassion, and that their rights should be recognized. Schopenhauer criticized traditional Christian views on animals, which he saw as immoral and based on a flawed assumption of human superiority. Instead, he cherished universal compassion that recognizes the inherent value of all living beings and is the motive for good and just actions. Still, he believed that humans need to eat animals for sustenance and because the capacity to suffer is linked with intelligence (and, for him, humans are much more intelligent than animals as they are the Will's highest form of manifestation or objecthood), people are justified in eating animals as they would suffer more by not eating animals than animals would by being killed.

==== Eduard von Hartmann ====
Von Hartmann echoed a perspective similar to British philosopher Jeremy Bentham's from a century earlier: since all animals inevitably face death, taking an animal's life in a manner that is quicker and less painful than what it would endure naturally should not be considered morally objectionable.

==== Julio Cabrera ====
Julio Cabrera argues that while humans are subjected to a triad of suffering — pain, discouragement, and moral impediment — non-human animals experience only a dyad: pain and discouragement, but not moral impediment. This is because they lack the capacity to be considered moral beings and therefore cannot fail morally. He suggests that this absence of a moral dimension might actually constitute a form of happiness for non-human animals, as it spares them one of the existential burdens humans face. As a result, their lives are not structurally disvalued in the same way as human lives. At the same time, he acknowledges that non-human animals still endure harsh conditions and significant suffering in the wild, further exacerbated by human actions.

Cabrera further argues that since animals are not moral beings, humans cannot enter into ethical relations with them, meaning we cannot hold moral duties toward animals or ascribe rights to them. However, while he argues that we cannot enter into contracts with non-human animals due to the absence of reciprocity, symmetry, and a moral dimension, this does not justify mistreatment of them. Instead, one might contend that focusing on their well-being rather than on formal ethical agreements, constitutes an ethical decision in itself—potentially the only viable approach we can take with animals (who lack a moral dimension).

=== Misanthropy ===
Misanthropy is closely related to philosophical pessimism but not identical with it. Philosophical pessimism is mainly concerned with the claim that life involves unavoidable suffering, whereas misanthropy is concerned with what it sees as the moral faults of human beings. A philosophical pessimist may argue that the suffering of existence is universal and cannot be escaped, while a misanthrope may stress the ways in which human actions increase this suffering through cruelty, indifference, and moral corruption. Both outlooks are critical of humanity, but pessimism is directed at the general nature of existence, and misanthropy at humanity's part within that existence.

Philosophical pessimism can move towards misanthropy when someone concludes that human nature contributes in an important way to the suffering and futility of existence. In the other direction, a misanthropic outlook may support a pessimistic view of life, since repeated negative experiences with other people can feed into wider feelings of distress about existence.

=== Abortion ===
Even though pessimists agree on the judgment that life is bad and some pessimistic antinatalists criticise procreation, their views on abortion differ.

==== Pro-death view ====
David Benatar holds a "pro-death" stance on abortion. He argues that in the earlier stages of pregnancy, when the fetus has not yet developed consciousness and has no morally relevant interests, we should adopt a presumption against carrying the fetus to term. What demands justification is not the act of abortion, but the failure to abort the fetus (in the early stages of pregnancy). Benatar does not argue that such early abortions should be mandatory, but only that it would be preferable to perform the abortion.

==== Anti-abortion view ====
Julio Cabrera argues that abortion always involves taking into account something that already exists. He holds that this "something" must be included in moral deliberation, whatever its precise nature. Writing from the perspective of negative ethics, Cabrera develops an argument against abortion. He begins by claiming that it is wrong to eliminate another human being solely for one's own benefit, since this treats the other as nothing more than an obstacle to be removed. He also stresses the moral importance of protecting those who cannot defend themselves, and in the context of gestation, pregnancy, and birth, he regards the fetus as the most helpless and vulnerable participant. In addition, he sees the fetus as a being who has already begun its career as a human being. For these reasons, Cabrera concludes that it is morally wrong to terminate (abort) a human being.

Cabrera adds several further considerations. Within his framework, all human beings are "valueless", so the agent who performs the abortion does not possess a higher value than the victim that could justify killing. He therefore recommends caution, arguing that abortion should not be carried out when it is hard to determine at what point a fetus becomes a human being. He states that a fetus has the potential to become a rational agent with consciousness, feelings, preferences, and thoughts, and that human beings are always in a process of building and shaping themselves, a description that in his view already applies to the fetus. He also maintains that a fetus, like any other human being, is already in a process of "decay". Finally, he proposes that moral debate should also consider the status of those who perform abortions and of the women who have abortions, and not only the status of the fetus.

=== Death ===
For Arthur Schopenhauer, every action (eating, sleeping, breathing, etc.) was a struggle against death, although one which always ends with death's triumph over the individual. Since other animals also fear death, the fear of death is not rational, but more akin to an instinct or a drive, which he called the will to life. In the end, however, death dissolves the individual and, with it, all fears, pains, and desires. Schopenhauer views death as a "great opportunity not to be I any longer". Our inner essence is not destroyed though — since we are a manifestation of the universal Will.

David Benatar has not only a negative view on coming into existence, but also on ceasing to exist. Even though it is a harm for us to come into existence, once we do exist we have an interest in continuing to exist. We have plans for the future; we want to achieve our goals; there may be some future goods we could benefit from, if we continue to exist. But death annihilates us; in this way robbing us from our future and the possibility of us realizing our plans.

== Criticism ==
=== Criticisms of Schopenhauer ===
==== Olga Plümacher ====
Swiss-American philosopher Olga Plümacher criticizes Schopenhauer's system on a variety of points. According to Schopenhauer, an individual person is itself a manifestation of the Will. But if that is the case, then the negation of the Will is also an illusion, since if it were genuine, it would bring about the end of the world. Furthermore, she notices that for Schopenhauer, the non-existence of the world is preferable to its existence. However, this is not an absolute statement (that is, it says that the world is the worst), but a comparative statement (that is, it says that it is worse than something else).

==== Eduard von Hartmann ====
Eduard von Hartmann wrote a similar criticism to that of Olga Plümacher. He pointed out that a being's individual will is only a specific appearance or "ray" of the One Will, such that individual negations of the Will are, according to him, ultimately futile (contrary to Schopenhauer); regardless of whether they occur through asceticism, sexual abstinence, death, or even suicide. The world's essence — as the metaphysical Will — shall ceaselessly continue to be objectified in new beings regardless of individual denials of it, since the Will itself cannot gain knowledge nor experience through non-collective efforts that would diminish its metaphysical potency. That is why, for Hartmann, only a "cosmic-universal" denial of the Will is sufficient for the misery and unreason of volition to finally come to an end.

==== Nietzsche ====
Although Nietzsche acknowledged Schopenhauer's influence on his early thought, he diverged from his mentor's conclusions, ultimately seeking a life-affirming philosophy.

Schopenhauer holds that life is fundamentally marked by suffering, driven by the "will to life", which he describes as a blind and insatiable force that produces endless desire and dissatisfaction. Nietzsche, by contrast, introduces the idea of the "will to power" as the basic drive in human beings, centred on self-overcoming and self-perfection rather than simple survival. Schopenhauer's view leads towards ascetic withdrawal and a denial of life, whereas Nietzsche, who still maintains a broadly pessimistic view of existence, criticises Schopenhauer's position as a form of "weakness" and instead argues for saying "yes" to life. For Nietzsche, life is not to be judged only by hedonistic standards of pleasure and pain, but also by the feelings of strength and power that can arise from facing and overcoming difficulty, pain, and suffering.

=== Sully's criticisms of philosophical pessimism ===
The 19th-century English psychologist and philosopher James Sully offers a psychological account of pessimistic beliefs, focusing on how internal dispositions and external impressions shape them. He treats the emotional state of Weltschmerz, a pervasive sadness about existence, not simply as a philosophical position but as something closely tied to individual psychological traits and to wider social and economic conditions.

He identifies several psychological traits that, in his view, tend to support a pessimistic outlook. These include a very sensitive emotional nature, which leads a person to constantly expect suffering; an irritable and defiant attitude that treats the world as hostile; a slow and low-energy temperament that makes life feel burdensome; a habit of constant criticism that keeps attention on the distance between the world and one's own ideals; and a wish to be admired, which can support pessimistic beliefs by encouraging people to see themselves as martyrs to suffering.

Sully's view resonates with the perspectives of other critics of pessimism, such as the 20th-century British philosophers Bertrand Russell and Bryan Magee, who also contend that pessimism is not a philosophical stance but rather an emotional one. Russell characterized pessimism as a matter of temperament rather than reason, while Magee suggested that Schopenhauer's despairing worldview could be seen as neurotic manifestations rooted in his relationship with his mother rather than a coherent philosophical argument. By framing philosophical pessimism as a response to emotional and environmental factors, Sully disputes its pretense rationality, suggesting that it may be more reflective of individual psychology and societal conditions than of "objective truths" about existence.

=== Against the claim that pleasure can only be negative ===
A claim that pessimists make is that pleasures are negative in nature: they are mere satisfactions of desires or removals of pains.

A counterargument to this claim is made by considering scenarios where one is undisturbed and engaged in something pleasurable:

Imagine that I am enjoying the state of being hydrated, full and warm. Then somebody offers me a small chocolate bon-bon, and I greatly enjoy the delicious taste of the dark chocolate. Why am I not experiencing more pleasure now than I was before (...)?

The objection here is that in this situation one would experience further pleasure, not that one merely no longer feels some pain, boredom, or desire.

Another counterargument to this claim is made by arguing that pleasurable experiences have intrinsic value that can be directly perceived via phenomenological introspection. Intrinsically good experiences include pleasant surprises, waking up in a good mood, savoring delicious meals, anticipating something good that will likely happen to us, and others.

== Influence outside philosophy ==
=== Television ===
The character of Rust Cohle in the first season of the television series True Detective is noted for expressing a philosophically pessimistic worldview; the creator of the series was inspired by the works of Thomas Ligotti, Emil Cioran, Eugene Thacker and David Benatar when creating the character.

=== Literature ===
Eugene Thacker, Colin Feltham, and Alan R. Pratt have mentioned several literary works and authors as being related, in some way or another, to philosophical pessimism.

== See also ==
- Antifrustrationism – Axiological position which prioritizes avoiding preference frustration
- Antinatalism – Value judgment that procreation is unethical
- Cynicism – Ancient school of philosophy
- Depressive realism – Hypothesis about depression
- Dystheism – Belief that a deity is not wholly good and is possibly evil
- History of philosophical pessimism – History of a philosophical school
- List of philosophical pessimists – Sortable list of philosophers of pessimism
- Misanthropy – General dislike of humanity
- Misotheism – Hatred of God or the gods
- Optimism bias – Type of cognitive bias
- Philosophy of death – Philosophical investigations regarding death
- Philosophy of suicide – Philosophical aspects and arguments about suicide
- Problem of evil – Philosophical question
- Suffering-focused ethics – Ethical views prioritising the reduction of suffering
- Wild animal suffering – Suffering of wild animals due to natural processes
