= Drew Dalton =

American philosopher

Drew M. Dalton
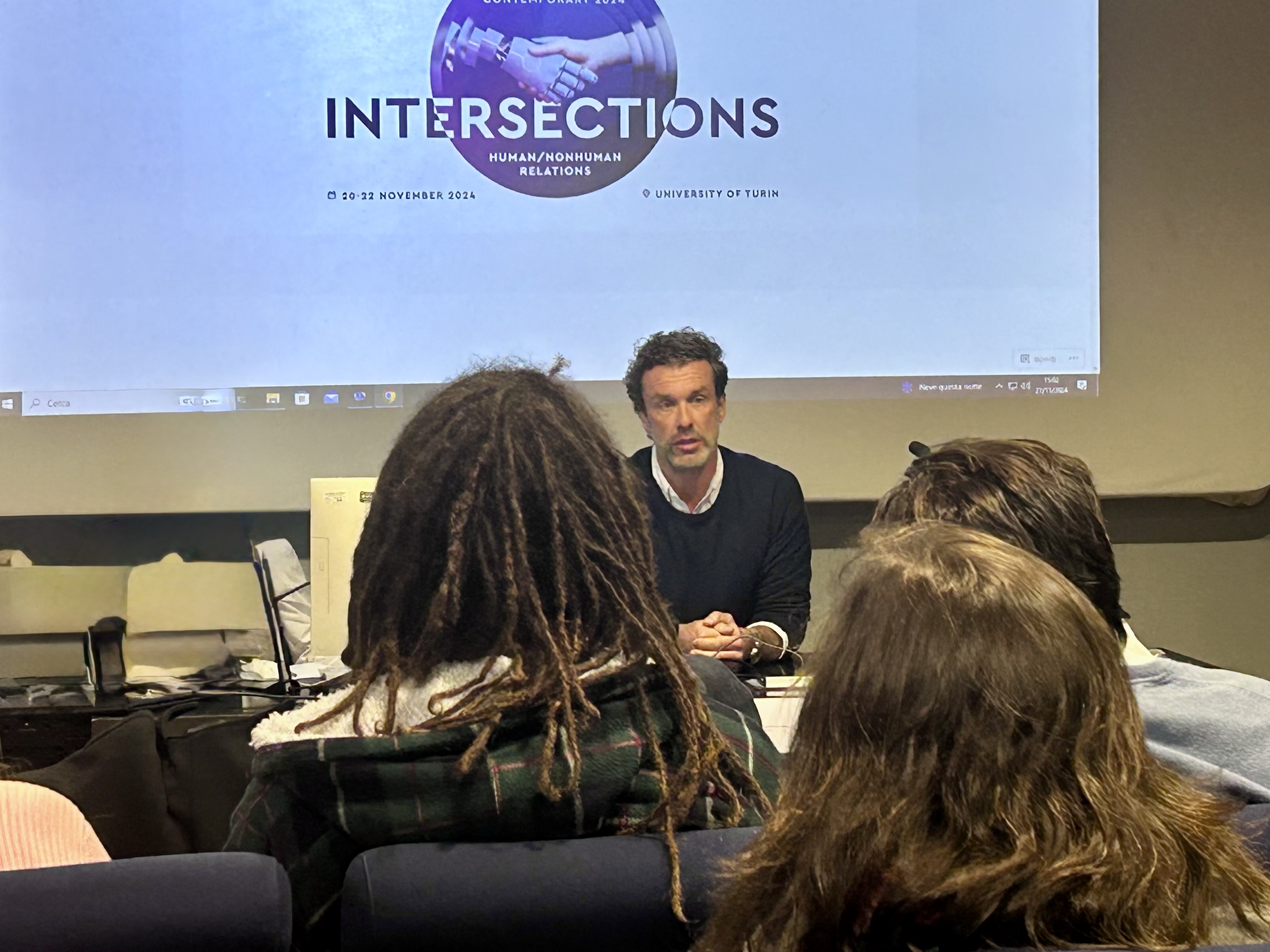
- Born: 1978 (age 47–48)

Education
- Education: Wheaton College (BA), KU Leuven (PhD)

Philosophical work
- Era: Contemporary philosophy
- Region: Western philosophy
- School: Continental philosophy, phenomenology, speculative realism, new materialism, pessimism
- Institutions: Indiana University, Dominican University
- Main interests: Literary theory, ethics, metaphysics, social philosophy, political philosophy, aesthetics
- Notable ideas: Ethics of Resistance, Metaphysics of Decay, Aesthetics of Escape

Drew M. Dalton (born 1978) is an American philosopher and a professor of English at Indiana University. Previously, he was a professor of philosophy at Dominican University. He is known for his works on continental philosophy. Dalton received his Doctor of Philosophy in philosophy from the Institute of Philosophy at the KU Leuven focusing on phenomenology and ethics, social and political philosophy.

== Thought ==
Dalton's work primarily address the concept of the absolute as it affects the various sub-branches of philosophy: ethics, metaphysics and aesthetics.

In ethics, Dalton argues that the pursuit of an absolute good inevitably leads to evil. Nevertheless, Dalton argues, one should not give up on the idea of absolutes entirely nor on the possibility of the good. Instead, Dalton promotes "ethical resistance," as the proper way of relating to any given absolute and pursuing the good. Only when the good is conceived of negatively, as a mode of resisting the possibility of absolute evil, he argues, can both the idea of the absolute and the concept of goodness be integrated into a practical ethics. In this way, his work on ethics draws from the tradition of philosophical pessimism to suggest that the good can only ever be conceived relatively, in relation to what he calls the "absolute evil of existence."

In metaphysics, Dalton argues for the idea of a "naturalized" or "material" absolute which he argues is deducible from the conclusions of contemporary scientific research, specifically work in contemporary thermodynamic astrophysics and biophysics on the function and nature of entropic decay over and within existence. From this, Dalton proposes a new conception of being as something which is "unbecoming."

In aesthetics, Dalton extends the conclusions of philosophical pessimism to champion an "aesthetics of escape," which justifies the indulgence in any artistic object that might effectively distract us from what he calls the "horror of reality," a conclusion he draws from his metaphysics and ethics.

== Philosophy ==
Dalton draws extensively from phenomenology, psychoanalysis, speculative materialism, philosophical pessimism, and German idealism.

Key elements of Dalton's works are:

- Suspicion of the Absolute Good: Dalton argues that the idea of a perfect, absolute good can lead to ethical problems and even evil if it is not related to properly. He refers to this idea as the "tyranny of the absolute." To make his case, Dalton uses examples from social and political history to demonstrate how concepts of the absolute good have been used to justify oppressive systems globally.
- Ethics of Resistance: Instead of seeking to affirm any absolute good, Dalton proposes developing an "ethics of resistance," which "resists" any given concept of the absolute good. For Dalton, ethical action is grounded in recognizing and resisting the allure of the absolute, wherever and however it appears. For this reason, Dalton proposes what he calls "ab-archy" as an ethical model for engaging with others in the socio-political realm.
- Metaphysics of Decay: Dalton argues that the only epistemologically valid source for philosophical absolutes is the mathematical and scientific study of matter. It is from this alone, he claims, that metaphysical absolutes can be developed. Following this logic, Dalton proposes a "metaphysics of decay," which he bases on the "thermodynamic revolution" in the contemporary material sciences. By speculatively extending the conclusions of the contemporary sciences, Dalton argues that one "natural absolute" that can be asserted is the idea of entropy which is defined in the second law of thermodynamics. From this he develops an account of being as something which is "unbecoming."
- Aesthetics of Escape: By Dalton's read, the primary function of art, contrary to traditional accounts, is not to help us "see the truth," and/or "confront reality" as it "actually is," but, precisely the opposite, to "carry us away" from what he calls the "moral horror" and "torment" of existence. For these reasons, he argues for the redemption of so-called "guilty pleasures" and "fiddling flights of fancy," "not merely as morally justified escapes from reality, but as existentially necessary palliatives against the misery of existence."

Dalton's scholarly work draws from and addresses thinkers and themes from:

- Pessimism: In relation to what he calls the "absolute unbecoming of existence," Dalton embraces "ethical pessimism," as a normative system. In "ethical pessimism," Dalton argues, one can ground ethical action and political engagement so long as goodness is conceived of negatively (per his "ethics of resistance" and development of "ab-archy" as a model of ethical social and political engagement).
- Phenomenology: Dalton's work heavily draws from phenomenological philosophy, particularly the ideas of Emmanuel Levinas, whom he often uses as a foil to frame his conception of the importance of resisting the absolute in order to be ethically responsible.
- Speculative Realism: Dalton argues that the best way to consider questions of the absolute is through a mode of speculative naturalism. In this regard, his work complements and draws from other contemporary speculative realists like Quentin Meillassoux and Ray Brassier. Unlike these two, however, Dalton argues that these speculative projects need not be at odds with phenomenology, but can be used together to develop a "speculative phenomenology."
- Social and Political Philosophy: Dalton's philosophical ideas are often worked out in relation to contemporary social and political issues, showing how the pursuit of absolute ideals can contribute to oppression and injustice; and, alternatively, how a proper relation to the possibility of the absolute, one mediated through "resistance" and "ab-archy" might ground a different conception of ethical social and political activity.

== Books ==
- Longing for the Other: Levinas and Metaphysical Desire (Duquesne University Press, 2009)
- The Ethics of Resistance: Tyranny of the Absolute (Bloomsbury, 2018)
- The Matter of Evil: From Speculative Realism to Ethical Pessimism (Northwestern University Press, 2023)
