= Julio Cabrera (philosopher) =

Argentine philosopher living in Brazil

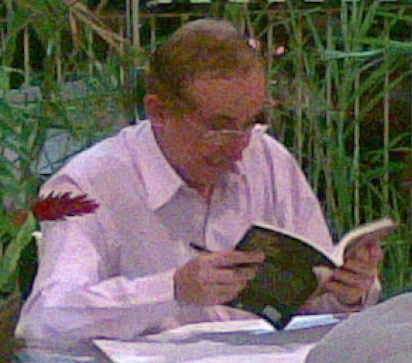
- Julio Cabrera in 2010, at the launch of his book Diary of a Philosopher in Brazil
- Born: Córdoba, Argentina

Education
- Education: National University of Córdoba

Philosophical work
- Era: Contemporary philosophy
- Region: Western philosophy
- Institutions: University of Belgrano; Federal University of Santa Maria; University of Brasília
- Main interests: Ethics · Cinema · Philosophy of language · Logic · Latin American philosophy
- Notable ideas: Negative ethics Cinema and philosophy
- Website: philosopherjuliocabrera.blogspot.com

Julio Cabrera is an Argentine philosopher living in Brazil. He is a retired professor of the Department of Philosophy at the University of Brasília and former head of the department. Previously he taught in Argentina, at the National University of Córdoba, the University of Belgrano and then in Brazil at the Federal University of Santa Maria. He is best known for his works on "negative ethics" and cinema and philosophy. Other areas of philosophy that he deals with are philosophy of language, logic and Latin American philosophy.

== Negative ethics ==
In his book A Critique of Affirmative Morality (A reflection on Death, Birth and the Value of Life), Julio Cabrera presents his theory about the value of human existence. Human life, for Cabrera, is "structurally negative" insofar as there are negative components of life that are inevitable, constitutive and adverse: as prominent among them Cabrera cites loss, scarcity, pain, conflicts, fragility, illness, aging, discouragement and death. According to Cabrera they form the basic structure to human life, which he analyzes through what he calls naturalistic phenomenology, drawing freely from thinkers such as Martin Heidegger, Arthur Schopenhauer and Friedrich Nietzsche. Cabrera has called his work an attempt to put together Schopenhauer and Heidegger, introducing a determinant judgement of the value of being into the analysis of Dasein, and putting morality above life, against Nietzsche.

Cabrera develops an ethical theory, negative ethics, that is informed by this phenomenological analysis. He argues that there has been an unwarranted prejudice in ethics against non-being, a view he calls "affirmativity". Because affirmative views take being as good, they always view things that threaten this hegemony as bad; particularly things like abstention from procreation or suicide. Cabrera criticizes affirmative ethics for asking how people should live without asking the radical question of whether people should live tout court. He argues that, because of the structural negativity of being, there is a fundamental "moral disqualification" of human beings due to the impossibility of nonharming and nonmanipulating others. Nonharming and nonmanipulating others is called by him the "Minimal Ethical Articulation" ("MEA"; previously translated into English as "Fundamental Ethical Articulation" and "FEA"). The MEA is violated by our structural "moral impediment", by the worldly discomforts – notably pain and discouragement – imposed on us that prevent us from acting ethically. Cabrera argues that an affirmative morality is a self-contradiction because it accepts the MEA and conceives a human existence that precludes the possibility of not-harming or not-manipulating others. Thus he believes that affirmative societies, through their politics, require the common suspension of the MEA to even function.

Cabrera's negative ethics is supposed to be a response to the negative structure of being, acutely aware of the morally disqualifying nature of being. Cabrera believes children are usually considered as mere aesthetic objects, are not created for their own sake but for the sake of their parents, and are thrown into a structurally negative life by the act of procreation. Procreation is, Cabrera argues, a harm and a supreme act of manipulation. He believes that the consistent application of normal moral concepts – like duty, virtue or respect – present in most affirmative moralities entails antinatalism. Cabrera also argues that a human being adopting negative ethics should not only abstain from procreation, but also should have a complete willingness for an ethical death, by immediate suspension of all personal projects in benefit of a political fight or an altruistic suicide, when it becomes the least immoral course of action.

Cabrera's Critique is one of his most systematic defenses of negative ethics, but he has also explored the same ideas in other works, such as Projeto de Ética Negativa, Ética Negativa: problemas e discussões, Porque te amo, não nascerás! Nascituri te salutant, Discomfort and Moral Impediment: The Human Situation, Radical Bioethics and Procreation, and A moral do começo: sobre a ética do nascimento.

== Cinema and philosophy ==
In his first book about cinema-philosophical thought, Cine, 100 años de filosofia: Una Introducción a la Filosofia A Traves del Análisis de Películas, Julio Cabrera proposes the notion of "logopathy" (from Greek: "logos" – "reason" and "páthos" – "feelings"), that is, of "cognitive-affective concepts", treating them as capable of putting in question the traditional view of philosophy about concepts, which he calls apathetic and tied to purely intellectual concepts. Cabrera sustains that logopathic philosophy is of the order of meaning, and not of truth, and that it adds affective elements of judgment to these traditional intellectual view of concepts.

Cabrera considers cinema one of the most fruitful means for the generation of concepts of a logopathic type, specifically denominated by him as "concept-image", as opposed to "concept-idea", the apathetic type of concept. He believes that cinema, by its powerful audiovisual means of expression, would provide a "superpotentiation" of conceptual possibilities, and therefore, of the establishment of the experience of the film, indispensable to the development of the concept-image, with the consequent increase of affective impact.

On the other hand, Cabrera believes that throughout history of European philosophy, at various moments, written philosophy – the opposite of visual philosophy – has also been logopathic, it has thought through affections, but without assuming it openly, while cinema usually has been seen only as a mere affective phenomenon, without relevant cognitive power. His notions of logopathy and concept-image seek to eliminate this dichotomy, pointing to the affectivity of the intellect and the cognitiveness of affections.

Cabrera gave continuity to the exposition of his cinema-philosophy thinking in books like De Hitchcock a Greenaway pela história da filosofia: novas reflexoes sobre cinema e filosofia (a sort of second volume of Cine: 100 anos de filosofia) and Diálogo/cinema, where in a debate through letters with Marcia Tiburi, he discusses the subject from the perspective that, long before the invention of the cinema, philosophy was already "filming" ideas through images, and also in articles Para una des-comprensión filosófica Del cine: el caso Inland Empire de David Lynch, Três ensaios sobre a repetição: Kierkegaard, Jarmusch, Hitchcock, Van Sant e três damas que desembarcam antes de chegar (Uma reflexão transversal sobre escrita e imagem), Existencia naufragada. Los 4 viajes del Titanic, Repetición y cine vacío. and Cine, filosofía y filosofía analítica.

== Philosophy of language and logic ==
For Cabrera, philosophies of language are philosophies for which language does not matter in so far as it merely conveys something, but insofar as it constitutes – and implements – concepts and structures of understanding of the world. From this large sense of the term, he identifies four philosophies of language, which are: analytical, hermeneutic, phenomenological and meta-critical. Looking through the prism of negativity, Cabrera shows how the four above types of philosophies of language fail at a common point: their incapacity to fight against the failures of meaning. For the analytics, the point presents itself in the "meaninglessness" of expressions which is treated as a limit beyond which one should not go. However, according to Cabrera, this analytic objectivism excludes fundamental dimensions of the problem of meaning, such as time and lived experience. Phenomenology expands the analytic semantic horizon with the dimension of intentionality (of which analytic intensionality is only an inauthentic correlate, essentially objective) without the problem of meaninglessness being tamed. It remains for phenomenology, however, the temporality and historicity that hermeneutics adds to the approach of the problem, which is called "misunderstanding". Hermeneutic falls into the basic "distortions of meanings", something stronger than "meaninglessness" and "misunderstanding", a subject of meta-critical philosophies, represented by Karl Marx's and Sigmund Freud's philosophies of language.

Cabrera strongly criticizes the analytic approach to language for its denial of everything that is not objective. But according to him, also the other philosophies of language show their faults, from phenomenology to hermeneutics and even meta-criticism harboring therapies redeeming only in an illusory manner: psychoanalytic healing or communist utopia. Cabrera's philosophy of language is a philosophy of confrontations between philosophies, which can only be made under the sign of resignation in finitude and negativism. He argues that not one of the kinds of philosophies of language that have been side-by-side in the last century and a half can, by itself, account for the complexity of the human. It is in this sense that, for Cabrera, all understanding is, ultimately, a self-sustaining illusion.

Logic for Cabrera is often linked to three fundamental principles: (1) The object that propositions deal with is indeterminate and general, (2) Logic applies to ordinary reasoning, albeit with some effort, and (3) Logic is formal rather than lexical, that is, based on the structural and non-semantic connections in language. Cabrera constructs his thought in this area by criticizing each of these three basic premises of the logical tradition.

His intuition in this field of research is the same as in others: the intersections of traditions enriches thought and is essential to account for the human condition. Thus, logical formalization is important for thinking about existence, just as the issues of human existence are essential for understanding thinking and logic. This conception of philosophy owes the hardly unorthodox intersections that Cabrera did in his studies of logic, connecting Saul Kripke with Martin Heidegger, Immanuel Kant with John Austin, and Ludwig Wittgenstein with Jean-Paul Sartre.

Cabrera's work has the expectation of allying the formal instruments to the existential contents of life. The critique to the alleged empty generality of logic goes in this direction as well as the proposal of a lexical logic of predicative connections, in an attempt to lend to lexical analysis a formal dimension, but loaded with content. The specific work on concept networks in lexical logic was developed in partnership with the physicist Olavo Leopoldino da Silva Filho, from the University of Brasilia.

His work on logic also proceeds to a revision of the history of logic. An outline of his version of the history of logic would be as follows: (1) The Platonic conception of logic. (2) Aristotle, in syllogisms and beyond. (3) The logic of the connections of meanings in the Middle Ages. (4) Modern criticisms of formal logic: Francis Bacon, René Descartes and John Locke, the scientific method and logic, philosophical analysis and heuristics, the Port-Royal Logic. (5) The case of Gottfried Wilhelm Leibniz: what the official history took and what it didn't analyze. (6) Formal logic, transcendental logic: Immanuel Kant. (7) The logic in motion of Georg Wilhelm Friedrich Hegel: Hegelian criticism of denial. (8) the logic of the induction of John Stuart Mill. (9) Three conceptions of logic in the passage from the nineteenth to the twentieth century: Gottlob Frege, John Dewey and Edmund Husserl, logic within analysis, pragmatism, and phenomenology. (10) The case of Charles Sanders Peirce: what the official story took and what it didn't analyze.

Cabrera also develops a negative approach to argumentation in the field of informal logic, a pessimistic parallel theory to his negative ethics. For him, an affirmative approach to argumentation is one in which philosophical problems are considered to have one solution or at least an adequate treatment amongst many others that are inadequate and wrong. In Cabrera's view, according to the affirmative approach, the multiplicity of answers given by philosophy is a mistake which must be "resolved" in some way. On the other hand, according to the negative approach, the multiplicity of answers given by philosophy is not a mistake, but its most natural development. The negative approach to argumentation is concerned with treating one's own position and perspective not as a unique truth, but as one of many within an extensive and complex holistic web of approaches and perspectives, that speak and criticize mutually without discarding one another, although each of such positions may be fiercely maintained based on its perspective and assumptions, supported on defensible grounds.

== Latin American philosophy ==
Cabrera argues that there are epistemic injustices associated with the practice of philosophy in colonized contexts such as in Latin America. In a lecture in Unisinos University, Cabrera began to enunciate the problem of colonization in philosophy in a succinct and direct way:

The problem is that they come here and talk about their philosophical problems in their language, and we go there and talk about their philosophical problems in their language.

A central idea he came to defend is that the current status of philosophy in many Latin American countries is a product of the way philosophy is taught, researched, and written by local institutions that are subordinate to the international scene. Professional philosophy in these countries have been developed around commenting European (and, to a lesser extent, North American) philosophers, and this emphasis has developed as a corollary of the idea that philosophy is done only with reference to European philosophers and no Latin American is encouraged to challenge this hegemony. Alongside this inhibition of Latin American philosophy is the idea that what is European is universal while what is Latin American is merely local or national. He makes a diagnosis in the form of "acervo T" ("T collection"), theses on the hegemony of Eurocentric philosophy; this collection of theses is understood by Cabrera as being tacitly adopted by most of the Latin American philosophers. In opposition to this colonial order, Cabrera proposes and recommends several practices concerning the teaching and practice of philosophy, among them: (1) A greater attention to Latin American sources so that the history of philosophy on the continent does not continue to be ignored by local philosophers and that the work of these philosophers be as much discussed as that of European sources, (2) A stimulus to philosophy that is not merely from Latin America nor about Latin America, but from Latin America where the local starting point is made explicit, (3) The practice of appropriation in which philosophers from other contexts are placed in discussions of interest to Latin America. This practice can be found in important philosophical works in Latin America such as that of Enrique Dussel with which Cabrera maintained published debates.

Cabrera has defended the crossing of boundaries between traditions and has on many occasions shown the potential for fertilization stemming from the juxtaposition, friction and debate between philosophies originating from analytical and continental traditions. Over time, he extended this metaphilosophical approach in the direction of making it an element of the struggle against what he began to clearly see as the colonized state of philosophy in Latin America.

In his book Diário de um filósofo no Brasil, Cabrera documents the problems of self-reliant inventive philosophy in Brazil; the book describes the environment of suppression of philosophical intuition in its many mechanisms attending to what is specific in the Brazilian colonized context. The book portrays what it means to philosophize from somewhere and tries to present alternatives to the philosophical commentary that can flourish even in a hostile environment.

For Cabrera, it is important to understand from where philosophy in Latin America is made: it is made from invaded, looted, dominated countries that have been placed in intellectual subservience. He claims that this makes the philosophy produced there different from all European philosophy – and it is important for him to stress that no philosophy is born universal. Cabrera notes that philosophy in Brazil, especially made in departments in the academy, is particularly blind to the sources of Latin American thought, both from the classics (Bartolomé de Las Casas, António Vieira, Flora Tristan, Juan Bautista Alberdi, José Martí and José Enrique Rodó) and contemporary (José Carlos Mariátegui, Edmundo O'Gorman, Leopoldo Zea, Miguel León-Portilla, Roberto Fernández Retamar and Santiago Castro-Gómez), known only in isolated expert communities. His proposition is a course in the history of thought that begins with pre-Columbian Amerindian thought and which does not pass through Europeans (nor Greeks) until the nineteenth century. The idea is to read nineteenth-century European philosophers who challenged intellectualist and Christian traditions, such as Arthur Schopenhauer, Søren Kierkegaard and Friedrich Nietzsche (and their precursors Michel de Montaigne, Denis Diderot and Jean-Jacques Rousseau), as creating ideas whose origins already existed in the Amerindian ways of living and thinking.

== Publications ==
=== Books ===
- Problemas de Estética e Linguagem. Uma abordagem analítica, Santa Maria: UFSM, 1985
- Textos de Filosofia Subjetiva, Porto Alegre: Movimento, 1985 (co-author with R. Reis)
- A Lógica Condenada, São Paulo: Universidade de São Paulo, 1987
- Nuevos viajes de Gulliver (Cuentos), Córdoba: Alción, 1989
- Projeto de ética negativa, São Paulo: Mandacaru, 1989 (second edition: A Ética e Suas Negações, Não nascer, suicídio e pequenos assassinatos, Rio de Janeiro: Rocco, 2011)
- El lógico y la bestia. Diversión para filósofos, Córdoba: Alción, 1995
- Critica de La Moral Afirmativa: Una Reflexión Sobre Nacimiento, Muerte y Valor de La Vida, Barcelona: Gedisa, 1996 (second edition in 2014); A critique of affirmative morality (A reflection on death, birth and the value of life), Julio Cabrera Editions, Brasília 2014 (English edition)
- Cine, 100 anos de filosofia: Una Introducción a la Filosofia A Traves del Análisis de Películas, Barcelona: Gedisa, 1999 (second edition em 2015); Da Aristotele a Spielberg. Capire la filosofia attraverso i film, Milano: Mondadori, 2000 (Italian edition); O Cinema Pensa: Uma Introdução À Filosofia Através dos Filmes, Rio de Janeiro: Rocco, 2006 (Portuguese edition)
- Margens das filosofias da linguagem: conflitos e aproximações entre analíticas, hermenêuticas, fenomenologias e metacríticas da linguagem, Brasília: UnB, 2003 (reprint in 2009)
- De Hitchcock a Greenaway pela história da filosofia: novas reflexoes sobre cinema e filosofia, São Paulo: Nankin, 2007
- Inferências Lexicais e Interpretação de Redes de Predicados, Brasília: UnB, 2007 (co-author with O.L. Da Silva Filho)
- Ética Negativa: problemas e discussões, Goiânia: UFG, 2008 (ed.)
- Porque te amo, não nascerás! Nascituri te salutant, Brasilia: LGE, 2009 (co-author with T. Lenharo di Santis)
- Análisis y existencia: pensamiento en travesía, Córdoba: Ediciones del Copista, 2010
- Diário de Um Filósofo no Brasil, Unijuí: Unijuí, 2010 (second edition in 2013)
- Diálogo/cinema, São Paulo: Senac, 2013 (co-author with M. Tiburi)
- Mal-estar e moralidade: situação humana, ética e procriação responsável, Brasília: UnB, 2018; Discomfort and Moral Impediment: The Human Situation, Radical Bioethics and Procreation, Newcastle upon Tyne: Cambridge Scholars Publishing, 2019 (English edition)
- Introduction to a Negative Approach to Argumentation: Towards a New Ethic for Philosophical Debate, Newcastle upon Tyne: Cambridge Scholars Publishing, 2019
- A moral do começo: sobre a ética do nascimento. Porto Alegre: RS: Editora Fi, 2019 (co-author with H. Bensusan and A.M. Wuensch)
- La Forma del Mundo: Ensayo sobre la muerte del ser. Elementos de Metafilosofía Primera, 2020
- Devorando Nietzsche. Por um Niilismo Sul-americano, 2022

=== Selected articles ===
==== Ethics ====
- Children's philosophy and children's sexuality: some remarks on Lipman and Freud, Thinking, The journal of philosophy for children. volume 13, number 3, Montclair State University, 1997
- A controvérsia de Hegel e Schopenhauer em torno das relações entre a vida e a verdade, Veritas, volume 42, number 1, Porto Alegre, 1997
- Para uma defesa nietzschiana da ética de Kant (a procura do super-homem moral) Uma reflexão semântica, Cadernos Nietzsche, volume 6, São Paulo, 1999
- Dussel y el suicídio, Dianoia, volumen XLIX, number 52, May 2004
- Sentido da vida e valor da vida (Uma diferença crucial), Philósophos, volume 9, number 1, Goiânia, 2004
- La cuestión ético-metafísica: valor y disvalor de la vida humana em el registro de la diferencia ontológica, in: V. Garrafa, Estatuto epistemológico de la bioética, Unam, Redbioética, Unesco, 2005
- O imenso sentido do que não tem nenhum valor, Philósophos, volume 11, number 2, Goiânia, 2006
- O que é realmente ética negativa?, Poliedro. Faces da Filosofia. Publit, soluções editoriais, Rio de Janeiro, 2006
- Ética e condição humana: notas para uma fundamentação natural da moral, in: A. Naves, Ética: questões de fundamentação, Brasília: UnB, 2007
- Suicídio. Aspectos filosóficos, Suicídio. Abordajes empíricos, Muerte, mortalidad y suicidio, entries of dictionary: Diccionario Latino-americano de Bioética, Unesco, Universidad Nacional de Colombia, Redbioética, 2008
- Quality of human life and non-existence (Some criticisms of David Benatar's formal and material positions), Redbioética, Unesco, 2, January–June 2011
- A ética negativa diante do culturalismo, Estudos Filosóficos, number 7, São João del Rei, July–December 2011
- Impossibilidades da moral: filosofia da existência, naturalismo e ética negativa, Filosofia Unisinos, 13, São Leopoldo, October 2012
- A possível incompatibilidade entre culturalismo e filosofias da existência, Estudos Filosóficos, Papemig, number 11, July–December 2013
- Heidegger para a Bioética, Latino-Americana de Bioética, volume 14, number 2, Bogotá, 2014 (co-author with M. Salamano)
- Sobre o raciocínio prático-moral, in: J. C. Brum, Manual de Ética. Editora Vozes, Educs, 2014
- Antinatalism and negative ethics, in: K. Lochmanová (ed.), History of antinatalism: how philosophy has challenged the question of procreation, 2020
- "For a Critique of Suicidal Reason". Nota do Tradutor (23). Translated by Rodrigo Menezes. Desterro: Revista de Tradução Literária e Biblioteca Digital: 44–58. 2021. ISSN 2177-5141.

==== Cinema and philosophy ====
- Recordando sem ira, in: S. Back, A guerra dos pelados, São Paulo: Annablume, 2008
- Para una des-comprensión filosófica Del cine: el caso Inland Empire de David Lynch, Enl@ce, year 6, number 2 Universidad del Zulia, Maracaibo, 2009
- Eutanásia poética, in: R. Cunha, O cinema e seus outros, Brasília: LGE, 2009
- Três ensaios sobre a repetição: Kierkegaard, Jarmusch, Hitchcock, Van Sant e três damas que desembarcam antes de chegar (Uma reflexão transversal sobre escrita e imagem), in: Ri. Timm De Souza et alia, Literatura e Cinema. Encontros contemporâneos, Porto Alegre: Dublinense, 2013
- Existencia naufragada. Los 4 viajes del Titanic, Per la Filosofia, Pisa-Roma: Fabrizio Serra, 2015
- Repetición y cine vacío, La Cueva de Chauvet, La Plata: Malisia, 2016
- Cine, filosofía y filosofía analítica, in: F. Santamaria Velasco et alia, Cine y Pensamiento Estéticas contemporáneas 9, Medellín-Bogotá: Universidades Bolivariana, Uniclaretiana y Santo Tomás, 2017

==== Philosophy of language and logic ====
- Categoremas y validez lógica, Latinoamericana de Filosofía, vol.VIII, no.1, Buenos Aires, March 1982
- Cortando árboles y relaciones. Una Reflexión escéptica en torno de un tema de Searle, Crítica, number 46, volume XVII, 1984
- Lenguaje valorativo como lenguaje metafísico, Portuguesa de Filosofia, volume XLIII, part 1–2, Braga, 1987
- Contra la condenación universal de los argumentos ad hominem, Manuscrito, volume XV, number 1, Campinas, abril 1992
- Como fazer coisas-em-si com palavras (Uma leitura austineana de Kant), Philósophos, volume 1, number 1, Goiania, 1996
- O mundo como sentido e referencia: semântica e metafísica em Wittgenstein e Schopenhauer, in: A. Naves, O. Araujo Vale, Filosofia, Lingüística, Informática. Aspectos da Linguagem, Goiás: UFG, 1998
- Acerca da expressão Das Nichts nichtet. Uma leitura analítica, Philósophos, volume 3, number 2, Goiania, 1998
- Words, Worlds, Words, Pragmatics and Cognition, volume 9, number 2, Amsterdam: John Benjamins Publishing, 2001
- Nada e negação (Entre Wittgenstein e Sartre), Tempo da Ciência, volume 10, numbers 19–20, Toledo: Unioeste, 2003
- Es realmente la lógica tópicamente neutra y completamente general?, Ergo, Xalapa-Veracruz, number 12, março 2003
- Redes predicativas e inferências lexicais. Uma alternativa a lógica formal na análise de linguagens naturais, São Leopoldo: Filosofia-Unisinos, maio-agosto 2006
- Três graus de divergência lógica: Hegenberg, Da Costa, Sampaio, Ergo, number 20, Xalapa: Universidad Veracruzana, 2007
- Lógica y Dialéctica. Lecturas oblicuas, in: A. Naves, Cirne. Sistema e Objeções, São Leopoldo: Unisinos, 2009
- Introduçao a uma abordagem negativa da argumentaçao, Signo, Santa Cruz do Sul, volume 42, number 73, January/April 2017

==== Latin American philosophy ====
- Por qué no agrado a los rebeldes (Acerca de la crítica de Gonzalo Armijos a mi texto sobre Kant y Austin), Philósophos, volume 6, numbers 1–2, 2001
- Excesso, ausência e decepção das significações: uma reflexão ético-semântica a partir de um fato traumático da história argentina, São Leopoldo: Unisinos, 19, January–April 2011
- Exclusão intelectual: a invisibilidade da ética brasileira no contexto mundial, in: D. Porto et alia, Bioéticas, poderes e injustiças: 10 anos depois, Brasília: Cátedra Unesco de Bioética, 2012
- Europeu não significa universal, brasileiro não significa nacional, Nabuco: Brasileira de Humanidades, 2014
- Tres críticas a la Erótica de la liberación de Enrique Dussel, in: P. Carbonari et alia, Filosofia e Libertação. Homenagem aos 80 anos de Enrique Dussel, Passo Fundo: Ifibe, 2015
- Comment peut-on etre un philosophe français au Brésil?, Cahiers critiques de philosophie, number 16, Harmann, Paris VIII, 2016
- Filosofar acadêmico e pensamento insurgente (Dis-pensando a filosofia a partir de Oswald de Andrade e Raul Seixas), Ideação, Bahia: Universidade Federal de Feira de Santana, number 35, January–June 2017
- Después del holocausto fundador. La singularidad y carácter incomprensible del holocausto como mecanismo ocultador del exterminio indígena, in: D. Pachon Soto et alia, Ética y Política en la filosofía de la liberación, Bogotá: Desde Abajo, 2017
- Esboço de una introducción al pensamiento desde 'América Latina', in: A.V. Flores, W. Frank, Problemas do pensamento filosófico na América Latina, Goiânia: Phillos, 2018
