= Chicago school (theology) =

Protestant theological movement at University of Chicago

- Type: Liberal Protestant theological movement
- Classification: Christianity
- Theology: Process theology Religious naturalism Liberal Christianity; American pragmatism
- Leaders: Gerald Birney Smith; Shirley Jackson Case; Henry Nelson Wieman; Charles Hartshorne; Bernard Loomer; Bernard Meland; Daniel Day Williams
- Founder: Shailer Mathews
- Origin: c. 1894; Chicago, Illinois
- Tertiary institutions: University of Chicago Divinity School
- Publications: The Social Teaching of Jesus (1897); The Source of Human Good (1946); Process and Reality (1929)

The Chicago school is a tradition of liberal Protestant theology that developed at the University of Chicago Divinity School from the 1890s through the mid-twentieth century. The movement is distinguished by its empirical orientation to religious inquiry, its use of socio-historical analysis, and its later engagement with process philosophy. Scholars of American religious history identify the Chicago school as one of the most influential currents in twentieth-century theological liberalism and as a major institutional precursor to process theology.

== Origins ==
The University of Chicago Divinity School was established in 1890 under the leadership of William Rainey Harper, the university's first president. Harper envisioned theology as an academic discipline subject to the same critical and scholarly standards as the natural and social sciences, rather than as confessional or ecclesiastical training. This vision shaped the Divinity School's early emphasis on historical, linguistic, and social-scientific approaches to religion.

The Divinity School incorporated the Baptist Union Theological Seminary, originally founded in 1865 as Morgan Park Theological Seminary, thereby situating Baptist theological education within a modern research university framework.

== First generation (1894–1930s) ==
=== Shailer Mathews ===
The formative figure of the Chicago school was Shailer Mathews, who joined the Divinity School faculty in 1894 and served as dean from 1908 to 1933. Trained as a historian with specialization in the French Revolution, Mathews brought historical and sociological analysis into theological method. Scholars describe his work as pioneering a socio-historical approach that treated religious doctrines as historically conditioned responses to social needs rather than as timeless metaphysical truths.

Mathews's first major publication, The Social Teaching of Jesus (1897), exemplified this method by interpreting Christianity through the lens of social ethics and emerging social science. The work is widely regarded as an early expression of liberal Protestant engagement with sociology and the Social Gospel movement.

Mathews also articulated what he termed "conceptual theism", arguing that theology should be grounded in disciplined empirical reflection on human experience rather than supernatural revelation alone. He maintained that theology, to remain credible in the modern world, must employ methods comparable in rigor to those of the social sciences.

=== Other first-generation figures ===
Several additional scholars contributed to the development of the first generation of the Chicago school. Gerald Birney Smith emphasized theories of emergence and the relevance of contemporary science for theology, extending Mathews's empirical orientation.

George Burman Foster advanced the School's critical stance toward traditional Christian doctrines, while Shirley Jackson Case applied historical-critical methods to the study of early Christianity and later served as dean of the Divinity School. Together, these figures reinforced the School's commitment to historical analysis and empirical inquiry.

== Second generation (1927–1950s) ==
=== Henry Nelson Wieman ===
A major transition occurred with the arrival of Henry Nelson Wieman in 1927. Wieman was invited to the Divinity School in part to interpret Alfred North Whitehead's Religion in the Making for the faculty, initiating sustained engagement with process philosophy at Chicago. Wieman developed what he termed "theological behaviorism," emphasizing empirical objectivity and the identification of observable processes of creative transformation within human experience. He wrote The Source of Human Good.

Although Wieman introduced Whitehead's thought to the Chicago context, he remained cautious about speculative metaphysics and advocated a form of religious naturalism grounded in empirical analysis rather than comprehensive metaphysical systems.

=== Charles Hartshorne ===
Charles Hartshorne joined the University of Chicago faculty in 1928 after serving as an assistant to Whitehead at Harvard University. He later received a joint appointment with the Divinity School, remaining at Chicago until 1955. Hartshorne developed a "neo-classical" metaphysics emphasizing becoming, relationality, and the dipolar nature of God, themes that became foundational for later process theology. His presence marked what scholars describe as the beginning of the Whiteheadian era at Chicago.

== Third generation (1940s–1960s) ==
=== Bernard Loomer ===
Bernard Loomer, educated at Chicago, authored an influential doctoral dissertation in 1942 on the methodological significance of Whitehead's philosophy for theology. Although unpublished, the dissertation circulated widely and shaped subsequent theological education at the Divinity School. As dean from 1945 to 1954, Loomer promoted the integration of Whitehead's Process and Reality into the core curriculum.

=== Bernard Meland ===
Bernard Meland synthesized the historical development of the Chicago school while advancing its process orientation. He later expressed concern that process theology had become overly scholastic and argued for a more culturally and symbolically sensitive approach, a position that influenced later theological movements including feminist and theopoetic theology.

=== Daniel Day Williams ===
Daniel Day Williams contributed to process theology through sustained reflection on divine love and relationality. Alongside Loomer and Meland, Williams played a central role in shaping philosophical theology at Chicago during the mid-twentieth century.

== Methodology and characteristics ==
The Chicago school is commonly characterized by its commitment to empirical theology, understood as the disciplined analysis of religious experience rather than reliance on supernatural revelation or ecclesiastical authority. Its theologians also employed socio-historical methods, interpreting doctrines as functional responses to historical and cultural conditions. Over time, these commitments converged with process philosophy, particularly through engagement with Whitehead's metaphysics.

== Legacy ==
The most significant legacy of the Chicago school lies in its role in the development of process theology. Although later centers such as the Claremont School of Theology became prominent in this tradition, scholars note that Chicago provided the earliest sustained institutional context for the application of Whiteheadian philosophy to Christian theology.

=== American Journal of Theology & Philosophy ===
The American Journal of Theology & Philosophy is a triannual peer-reviewed academic journal that publishes scholarship exploring the intersection of theology and philosophy, with particular emphasis on American religious and philosophical traditions associated with the Chicago school, including empirical theology, religious naturalism, and American pragmatism. It is the official journal of the Institute for American Religious and Philosophical Thought (IARPT) and is published on their behalf by the University of Illinois Press. It was founded in 1980 by Larry E. Axel (Purdue University) and W. Creighton Peden (Augusta State University), who served as co-editors-in-chief. Peden served as founding co-editor from 1980 to 1991. In 1986, a conference held in Paderborn, Germany led to discussions about expanding the journal's institutional framework. That same year, the Highlands Institute for American Religious Thought was established to support the journal's mission. The institute was later renamed the Highlands Institute for American Religious and Philosophical Thought to reflect its broader scope. In 2012, the institute was reorganized as the Institute for American Religious and Philosophical Thought, which continues to serve as the journal's sponsoring organization.
