= Bernard Loomer =

American theologian

Bernard M. Loomer
- Born: 5 March 1912
- Died: 15 August 1985 (aged 73)

Philosophical work
- Era: 20th-century philosophy
- Region: Western philosophy
- Notable ideas: "Size" as the stature of one's soul, or the power to sustain complex tensions. God defined as the interconnected web of existence

Bernard MacDougall Loomer (March 5, 1912 – August 15, 1985) was an American professor and theologian. Loomer was longtime Dean of the University of Chicago Divinity School and a leading proponent of Process Theology.

== Biography ==
Loomer is principally known as contributor to the study of process theology, though Loomer's pantheism is rather at odds with the panentheism that is commonly associated with process theology. Loomer wrote “The world is God because it is the source and preserver of meaning; because the creative advance of the world in its adventure is the supreme cause to be served; because even in our desecration of our space and time within it, the world is holy ground; and because it contains and yet enshrouds the ultimate mystery inherent within existence itself. . . . The world in all the dimensions of its being is the basis for all our wonder, awe, and inquiry.” Loomer decried theological certainty and delighted in the wonder of existence: “Final answers are not to be trusted. We are born in mystery, we live in mystery, and we die in mystery."

The thinkers that perhaps had the largest influence on Loomer were Henry Nelson Wieman and Alfred North Whitehead, and yet Loomer came to believe that even these two sometimes fell into the trap of "misplaced concreteness" in their respective versions of theism. According to Nancy Frankenberry, Loomer's contributions were "as much by way of the art of concentrated teaching and contagious conversation as by way of his intermittent publications." Former students of Loomer include Nancy Frankenberry, John B. Cobb Jr., Catherine Keller, and Bruce Epperly.

Epperly recalls his time in Loomer's classroom: "Always wearing a white turtleneck with a pipe in his pocket, Loomer held forth. There was no telling where the class might go on any particular day. Our conversations were wide-ranging and unscripted, and we learned as much about Loomer as the “orthodoxies” of process thought."

Charles Hartshorne credited Loomer as being the originator of the term "process thought" as a designation for the philosophy espoused by Alfred North Whitehead and his followers. Later in life, Loomer stated that he disliked the term. "If I am guilty, it was a sin of my youth, and I have spent my latter days repenting!" Loomer preferred the term "process/relational thought." He wrote that "...the distinctive aroma of this outlook occurs when you combine the ultimacy of process with the primacy of relationships. It is really relationships that process is all about."

As Loomer continued focus on the relational aspect of his thought, he also brought repeated emphasis to what he called "S-I-Z-E" (always written with capital letters with dashes in between). His essay "S-I-Z-E" contains Loomer's most often quoted passage: "By S-I-Z-E I mean the stature of a person's soul, the range and depth of his love, his capacity for relationships. I mean the volume of life you can take into your being and still maintain your integrity and individuality, the intensity and variety of outlook you can entertain in the unity of your being without feeling defensive or insecure. I mean the strength of your spirit to encourage others to become freer in the development of their diversity and uniqueness. I mean the power to sustain more complex and enriching tensions. I mean the magnanimity of concern to provide conditions that enable others to increase in stature."

Another important essay was "The Size of the Everlasting God," written in 1975, but published in 2013. A different essay with a similar title, "The Size of God," was presented at two separate sessions (annual meetings) of the American Academy of Religion in 1978 and 1979. "The Size of God," has been characterized by Frankenberry as "a long, dense, and disturbing document... in which Loomer's prose, as one commentator noted, 'leans into the wind.'" This essay was originally published by the American Journal of Theology and Philosophy, and later reprinted in "The Size of God: The Theology of Bernard Loomer in Context," with lively responses and commentary (not all entirely supportive) from William Dean, Larry E. Axel, John Cobb, Delwin Brown, Bernard Lee, and Nancy Frankenberry. Referring to the meetings where Loomer originally presented this material, the preface to this book states, "These public meetings were controversial, a condition stimulated not only by the distinctiveness of Loomer's argument but by the way his prose leans into the wind."

In the essay, Loomer provided critical analysis of process oriented thinkers, such as Hartshorne, Whitehead, and Wieman. Frankenberry summarizes, quoting Loomer: "God is to be identified with the totality of the world, with whatever unity the totality possesses...More concretely, God is expressed as the organic restlessness of the whole body of creation, as this drive is unequally exemplified in the several parts of this societal web." Frankenberry points out that Loomer is "advancing the thesis that 'an ambiguous God is of greater stature than an unambiguous God,'" and in so doing is cutting against not only traditional Western religious thought, but also against much modern thought, from Kant to Niebuhr.

== Reception ==
Religious historian Jerome A. Stone credits Loomer with contributing to the early thinking in the development of Religious Naturalism. Stone also notes that Loomer's essay on "Two Conceptions of Power" might have been the first to distinguish between 'power-over' and 'power-with.' Loomer's terms were unilateral power vs. relational power.
