= Center for Process Studies =

Logo

The Center for Process Studies (CPS) was founded in 1973 by John B. Cobb and David Ray Griffin to encourage exploration of the relevance of process thought to many fields of reflection and action. As a faculty center of Claremont School of Theology in association with Claremont Graduate University, and through seminars, conferences, publications and the library, CPS seeks to promote new ways of thinking based on the work of philosophers Alfred North Whitehead, and Charles Hartshorne, and others in the process tradition.

CPS seeks to promote the common good by means of the relational approach found in process thought. Process thought helps to harmonize moral, aesthetic, and religious intuitions with scientific insights, and grounds discussion between Eastern and Western religious and cultural traditions. It seeks to offer an approach to the social, political, and economic order that brings issues of human justice together with a concern for ecology. Its range of interests also includes scientific, philosophical, multicultural, feminist, interreligious, political, and economic concerns; with a strong focus on ecology and sustainability.

CPS leadership currently includes Executive Director, Wm. Andrew Schwartz, three Faculty Co-Directors, Philip Clayton, Monica Coleman, Roland Faber, and three Emerita Faculty Co-Directors, including Marjorie Hewitt Suchocki and the late John B. Cobb and David Ray Griffin.

== Programs and projects ==
The Center for Process Studies works across disciplines to promote the exploration and application of process-relational thinking in various areas. Over the years, special "Projects" have been created for ongoing work in key area. Below is a list of current Projects.

Common Good International Film Festival
The Common Good International Film Festival is an annual event that celebrate films that foster social and personal responsibility to others and the earth; films that elicit common sense, common decency, and the common good. Whiteheadian philosophy provides a worldview that fosters social and personal responsibility to one another and to the earth that sustains us. Intercultural appreciation and understanding is a component of the common good that can be fostered by viewing and discussing excellent films produced around the world.

Whitehead Research Project
The Whitehead Research Project (WRP) is committed to scholarship on the texts, philosophy, and life of Alfred North Whitehead. WRP places Whitehead's thought in dialogue with contemporary philosophies in order to unfold his philosophy of organism and its consequences for our time.

Process & Faith
Process & Faith (P&F) is dedicated to providing practical applications of process-relational theology. P&F creates non-technical educational resources for clergy and laypersons of all faiths, including short-term courses and an online quarterly magazine Creative Transformation. P&F also makes available process-related books and other resources through its bookstore.

The China Project
The China Project translates major process texts into Chinese, holds academic conferences in the United States and China, sponsors an annual "Process Academy" in China, hosts visiting Chinese scholars in Claremont, and has established over 23 Centers for Process Studies in China.

The Korea Project
The Korea Project brings East and West together, by translating, publishing, organizing conferences, and offering Korean-language programs for students.

Latin America Project
The Latin America Project works to establish positive relations between Liberation Theology and process thought, by hosting conferences and translating process-related materials into Spanish and Portuguese.

== Publications ==
Journal
The primary publication of the Center for Process Studies is the academic journal, Process Studies. Through feature articles, book reviews, critical studies, and special focus sections, the journal engages in advancing the discussion of process thought and its applicability across disciplines. Process Studies Supplement, an electronic publication available through the CPS website, makes available articles too long for the regular journal format.

Newsletter
Process Perspectives is the Newsmagazine of the Center for Process Studies. It provides short thematic essays, reports on Center sponsored activities, and updates on activities from affiliated groups around the world, including the International Process Network of which CPS is a member.

== Library and archives ==
The library's approximately 2,400 books, 750 dissertations, and 12,000 articles comprise the world's largest collection of writings in the Whiteheadian-Hartshornean tradition of process thought. The library has thematic bibliographies to guide researchers to process scholarship in over 300 areas, such as aesthetics, biblical studies, ecology, economics, education, ethics, feminist theory, metaphysics, natural sciences, psychology, theology, and world religions and philosophies. CPS also maintains a collection of audio-visual materials that deal with process issues.

The Hartshorne Archive makes the primary and secondary works of Charles Hartshorne accessible. The library also maintains an archive of the works of Will Beardslee. Papers by the CPS co-directors and others, including Alfred North Whitehead, Charles Birch, John Spencer, and Daniel Day Williams, are held in special collections. Unpublished conference and seminar papers are also in the library holdings. CPS regularly hosts visiting scholars who make use of these resources for their research.

== Conferences and seminars ==
The Center organizes conferences, seminars, and lectures on topics ranging from physics, education, and ecology to Buddhist and Chinese philosophy; from gender, race, poverty, and human rights to hermeneutics and transpersonal psychology. These conferences are a central part of CPS's work as they demonstrate the relevance of process thought to many fields.

The Center for Process Studies: Conferences and Conversations is a pictorial history of the original Center for Process Studies which includes Charles Hartshorne, John Cobb Jr., David Ray Griffin, Lewis S. Ford, Catherine Keller, and others associated with the Center's history. The Center for Process Studies: Conferences and Conversations includes original letters, CPS conference lists, photographs, and other ephemera from the CPS archives. The book was edited and published by Jahan Brian Ihsan, in December 2022, and contains a foreword by Wm. Andrew Schwartz, Executive Director of Center for Process Studies.

== Related organizations ==
Toward Ecological Civilization
Toward Ecological Civilization (EcoCiv) propels scholars, activists, and policy experts toward realizing an ecological civilization―a fully sustainable human society in harmony with surrounding ecosystems and communities of life. They provide momentum for integrating work across sectors that leads to concrete action, including grassroots innovations, policy reform, and laying the foundations for a sustainable future.

International Process Network
The International Process Network (IPN) works primarily to promote communication among process-related organizations and concerned individuals. To this end IPN hosts a website (www.processnetwork.net) and hosts international conferences.

Society for the Study of Process Philosophies
The Society for the Study of Process Philosophies (SSPP) is a satellite organization of the American Philosophical Association. The SSPP holds periodic meetings in conjunction with the APA, as well as with the Society for the Advancement of American Philosophy.

Open and Relational Theologies Group
The Open and Relational Theologies Group is a program unit of the American Academy of Religion, which brings together scholars of diverse interests and concerns; many of whom identify with open theology as well as process thought.

Institute for Postmodern Development of China
The Institute for Postmodern Development of China (IPDC) works closely with the China Project of CPS to create and promote new modes of development in China and the West, by integrating classical Chinese philosophy with constructive postmodernism.

Chromatiques whiteheadiennes & Whitehead Psychology Nexus
The Chromatiques and the WPN are two scholarly societies intended to federate European research on different aspects, nuances, and implications of the thought of A. N. Whitehead. In 2002, Michel Weber also created the research seminars "Chromatiques whiteheadiennes" in the UFR de Philosophie, Université Paris 1.

A complete list of affiliated organizations is available online.
