= Rita Nakashima Brock =

American scholar and Protestant theologian

Rita Nakashima Brock (born April 1950 in Fukuoka, Japan) is an American feminist scholar, Protestant theologian, activist, and non-profit organization leader. She is an independent scholar and a Commissioned Minister in the Christian Church (Disciples of Christ).

== Early life ==
The daughter of Ayako Nakashima and a U.S. Army soldier from Dorado, Puerto Rico, Clemente Morales Torres, she was raised by her mother and grandparents until October 1952, when her mother married Roy Grady Brock, a U.S. Army soldier and veteran of World War II who fought at Normandy. Her legal name was Rita Nakashima until Roy Brock adopted her in 1958, when her name was changed to Rita Brock. The period of her life in Japan and her first 30 years in the U.S. is covered in her theological memoir, Proverbs of Ashes: Violence, Redemptive Suffering and the Search for What Saves Us, co-authored with Rebecca Ann Parker.

== Early career ==
Brock has a B.A, from Chapman University (1972) and holds the Rel. M., degree from the Claremont School of Theology (1974), and the M.A. (1980), and Ph.D. (1988) in Philosophy of Religion and Theology from the Claremont Graduate University in California.

Brock is the first Asian American woman to earn a doctorate in theology. She was associated with the Pacific Asian Center for Theology and Strategies (PACTS) at the Pacific School of Religion in Berkeley, California, from 1978 to 1999, and is a founder of and an emerita faculty advisor for the Pacific, Asian, North American Asian Women in Theology and Ministry beginning in 1985.

From 1977 to 1980, Brock was an adjunct instructor and Assistant Chaplain at Chapman University and from 1980 to 1981, she taught biblical studies at Scripps College. Her first full-time teaching appointment was as assistant professor of religion at Jarvis Christian College in Hawkins, Texas, a historically black college in her denomination (1981–82). She later taught religion for a year (1983–84) at Valparaiso University.

In 1984, Brock was hired for a teaching position in philosophy and religion at Stephens College in Columbia, Missouri. In her second year, she became the Women's Studies program director (1985–89) and partnered with Planned Parenthood in annual Roe v. Wade events and offering classes in reproductive rights and freedoms. She completed her doctoral dissertation in 1987 and was mentored in its completion by Bernard Loomer. She graduated in June 1988 with her Ph.D. Her doctoral advisor was John B. Cobb, a leading figure in Process Theology. The revised manuscript was published by Crossroads Press in November 1988, and it won the publisher's award for the best manuscript of the year in Women's Studies. Released as Journeys By Heart: A Christology of Erotic Power, it was the second book-length feminist Christology and the first work in feminist theology to use the concept of erotic power found in the works of Audre Lorde and Haunani-Kay Trask.

== Mid-career ==
From 1989 to 1990, Brock taught religion and women's studies at Pacific Lutheran University in Tacoma, Washington. In March 1989, she was offered the Endowed Chair in the Humanities at Hamline University in St. Paul, Minnesota, where she began teaching that fall. She became a professor and received tenure in her third of seven years there. In 1991, she worked with Twin Cities Asian Americans, such as writer David Mura and activist Valerie Lee, to create the Asian American Renaissance, an organization that used the arts to educate the public about racism against Asian Americans and the contributions of Asian Americans in the arts and humanities. This organizational work became a basis for the creation of the first humanities conference about Asian Americans ever held in the Twin Cities in 1996, called "The Other Half of the Basket", with a grant she received from the Minnesota Humanities Commission.

In 1996, Brock published her second, award-winning book with co-author Susan Brooks Thistlethwaite, Casting Stones: Prostitution and Liberation in Asia and the United States (Fortress), which won the Catholic Press Award in Gender Studies. It was the first work in feminist theology to address the topic of sex work and justice.

From 1997 to 1999, Brock directed the Bunting Institute at Radcliffe College, founded in 1959 by Mary Ingraham Bunting to advance the careers of professional women in all fields. During those first two years at Radcliffe, Brock served on the senior management team that created a plan to merge Radcliffe with Harvard as the university's tenth school. In the fall of 1999, Radcliffe merged with Harvard and became the Radcliffe Institute for Advanced Study and Brock was named the first director of the Radcliffe Fellowship Program at Harvard University, a position she held for two years. In 2001, she and Rebecca Ann Parker, President of the Starr King School for the Ministry and a friend from graduate school, published a theological memoir in two voices, "Proverbs of Ashes: Violence, Redemptive Suffering, and the Search for What Saves Us". From 2001 to 2002, Brock was a fellow at the Harvard Divinity School Center for Values in Public Life and began research for her second book with Parker.

Brock was appointed a visiting scholar at the Starr King School for the Ministry at the Graduate Theological Union in Berkeley from 2002 to 2012. With her move to Berkeley in May 2002, Brock continued work on her book project with Rebecca Parker which would become the 2008 work, Saving Paradise: How Christianity Traded Love of This World for Crucifixion and Empire (Beacon). It was selected by Publishers Weekly as one of the best books in religion in 2008. Released in 2012 in the UK as Saving Paradise: Recovering Christianity’s Forgotten Love for This Earth (Canterbury Press), it was selected as the theme book for the 2012 Greenbelt Festival in Cheltenham, England.

Brock was also a blogger for the Huffington Post Religion section from 2008 to 2016. Late in 2008, Brock began working with Gabriella Lettini on the Truth Commission on Conscience in War, which was held at the Riverside Church in New York in March 2010. In response to a unanimous recommendation from the Truth Commission that public education about moral injury be offered, Brock and Lettini wrote Soul Repair: Recovering from Moral Injury After War (Beacon, 2012), one of the first books written on moral injury. With a grant from the Lilly Endowment, Inc., Brock co-founded the Soul Repair Center in 2012 at Brite Divinity School at Texas Christian University with retired Army Chaplain, Col. Herman Keizer Jr., and directed it until May 2017.

== Later career ==
From June 2017 to July 2025, Brock served as Senior Vice President for Moral Injury Recovery Programs and founded the Shay Moral Injury Center at Volunteers of America, named in honor of retired VA psychiatrist and noted scholar of moral injury Jonathan Shay.

Brock's work involved assisting VOA's affiliates across the U.S. in implementing moral injury education programs that furthered the mission of caring for those at risk. As the global COVID pandemic took hold, programs were moved online and expanded from veterans into the many populations experiencing moral injury, such as healthcare workers and first responders.

== Publications ==
Brock has authored one book, co-authored four books, co-edited five books, and published many essays primarily on moral injury, theology and culture, feminist theology, sexuality and religion. Her books are:

- (with Gabriella Lettini) Soul Repair: Recovering from Moral Injury After War (Boston: Beacon Press, 2012).
- (with Rebecca Ann Parker) Saving Paradise: Recovering Christianity’s Forgotten Love for This Earth (Canterbury Press UK, 2012).
- (with Rebecca Ann Parker) Saving Paradise: How Christianity Traded Love of This World for Crucifixion and Empire (Boston: Beacon Press, 2008).
- (with Rebecca Ann Parker) Proverbs of Ashes: Violence, Redemptive Suffering and the Search for What Saves Us (Boston: Beacon Press, 2001), which was released in Japanese translation in March 2025.
- (with Susan Brooks Thistlewaite) Casting Stones: Prostitution and Liberation in Asia and the United States (Minneapolis: Fortress Press, 1996).
- Journeys By Heart: A Christology of Erotic Power (New York: Crossroad Press, 1988).
