= Marjorie Hewitt Suchocki =

- Born: 1933 (age 92–93)
- Education: Pomona College; Claremont Graduate School
- Occupations: Theologian, author, professor
- Employer: Claremont School of Theology
- Known for: Process theology; co-director of the Center for Process Studies

Marjorie Hewitt Suchocki (born 1933) is an author and United Methodist professor emerita of theology at Claremont School of Theology. She is also co-director of the Center for Process Studies at Claremont.

Suchocki earned a Bachelor of Arts degree in philosophy from Pomona College in 1970 and both Master of Arts and Doctor of Philosophy degrees in religion from Claremont Graduate School in 1974. She taught at Pittsburgh Theological Seminary from 1977 to 1983. From 1983 to 1990, she was professor of systematic theology and dean of Wesley Theological Seminary. In 1990, Suchocki returned to Claremont School of Theology, where she held the endowed Ingraham chair in theology and joint appointment at the Claremont Graduate University until her retirement in 2002. She has held visiting professorships at Vanderbilt University in 1996 and 1999, and at the Ruprecht Karl University of Heidelberg in Heidelberg, Germany, in 1992.

Since 2001, Suchocki has been director of the Whitehead International Film Festival. She is considered along with John B. Cobb and David Ray Griffin as one of the leaders in the field of process theology.

== Books ==
- God Christ Church: A Practical Guide to Process Theology, Crossroad, 1982 (227 p.), ISBN 0-8245-0464-X, revised ed. 1989 (263 p.): ISBN 0-8245-0970-6
- The End of Evil: Process Eschatology in Historical Context, State University of New York Press, 1988, ISBN 0-88706-724-7
- The Fall to Violence: Original Sin in Relational Theology, Continuum International, 1995, ISBN 0-8264-0860-5
- Trinity in Process: A Relational Theology of God, (coeditor with Joseph A. Bracken), Continuum International, 1996, ISBN 0-8264-0878-8
- In God's Presence: Theological Reflections on Prayer, Chalice Press, 1996, ISBN 0-8272-1615-7
- The Whispered Word: A Theology of Preaching, Chalice Press, 1999, ISBN 0-8272-4239-5
- Divinity and Diversity: A Christian Affirmation of Religious Pluralism, Abingdon Press, 2003, ISBN 0-687-02194-4
