= John B. Cobb =

American theologian, philosopher and environmentalist (1925–2024)

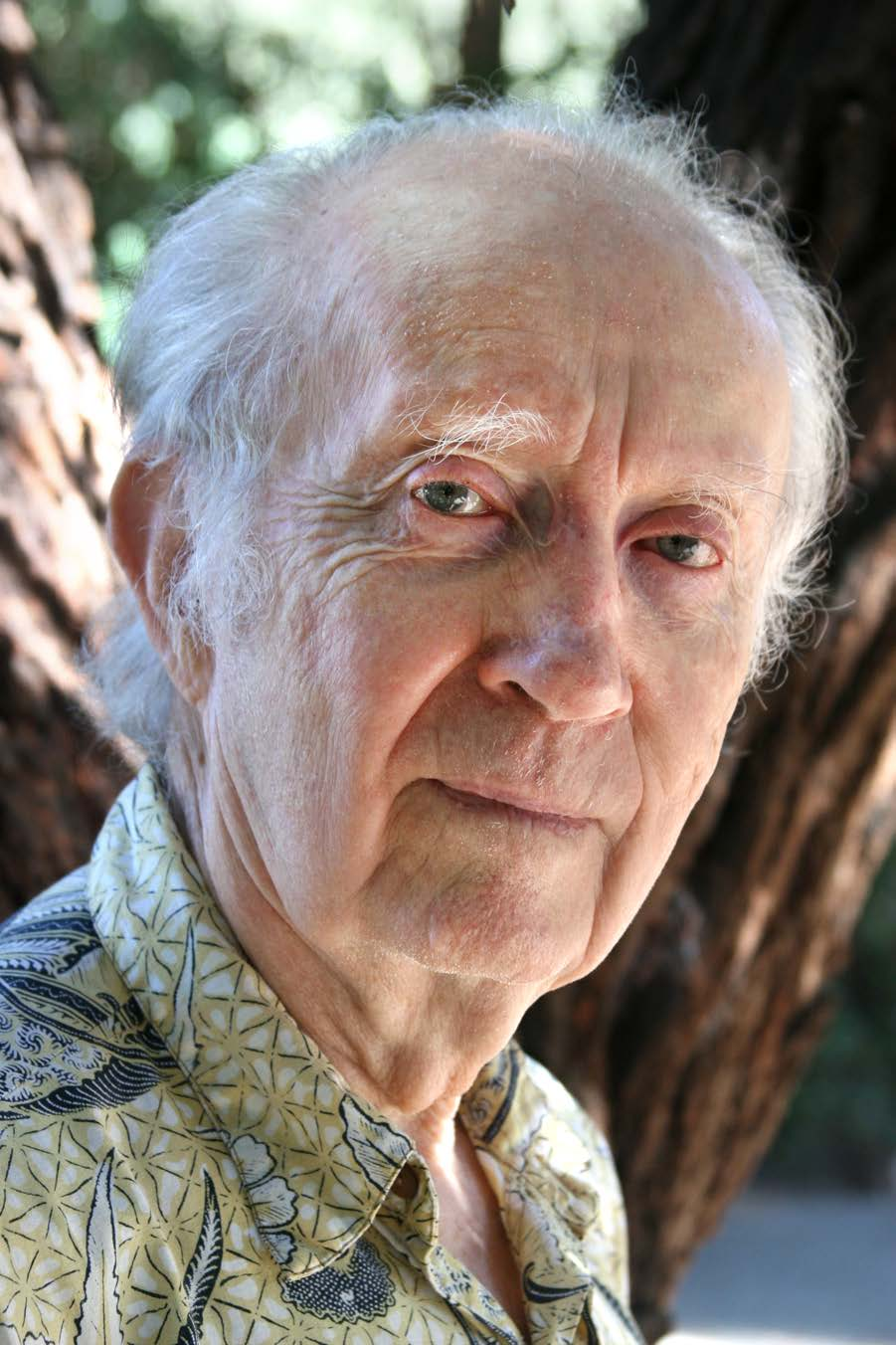
- Cobb in 2013
- Born: John Boswell Cobb Jr. 9 February 1925; Kobe, Hyōgo Prefecture, Japan
- Died: 26 December 2024 (aged 99)
- Spouse: Jean L. Cobb (m. 1947)

Academic background
- Education: University of Chicago
- Thesis: The Independence of Christian Faith from Speculative Beliefs (1952)
- Doctoral advisor: Charles Hartshorne
- Influences: Richard McKeon; Alfred North Whitehead; Daniel Day Williams

Academic work
- Discipline: Theology; philosophy
- School or tradition: Process philosophy; Process theology
- Institutions: Emory University; Claremont School of Theology
- Doctoral students: Rita Nakashima Brock; Catherine Keller
- Main interests: Metaphysics; Environmental ethics
- Notable ideas: Christocentric pluralism; ISEW
- Influenced: Monica Coleman · Bruce Epperly · Roland Faber · David Ray Griffin; C. Robert Mesle; Michel Weber

John Boswell Cobb Jr. (9 February 1925 – 26 December 2024) was an American theologian, philosopher, and environmentalist. He is often regarded as the preeminent scholar in the field of process philosophy and process theology, the school of thought associated with the philosophy of Alfred North Whitehead. Cobb is the author of more than fifty books. In 2014, Cobb was elected to the American Academy of Arts and Sciences.

A unifying theme of Cobb's work was his emphasis on ecological interdependence—the idea that every part of the ecosystem is reliant on all the other parts. Cobb argued that humanity's most urgent task is to preserve the world on which it lives and depends, an idea which his primary influence, Whitehead, described as "world-loyalty".

Cobb is well known for his transdisciplinary approach, integrating insights from many different areas of study and bringing different specialized disciplines into fruitful communication. Because of his broad-minded interest and approach, Cobb has been influential in a wide range of disciplines, including theology, ecology, economics, biology, and social ethics.

In 1971, he wrote the first single-author book in environmental ethics, Is It Too Late? A Theology of Ecology, which argued for the relevance of religious thought in approaching the ecological crisis. In 1989, he co-authored the book For the Common Good: Redirecting the Economy Toward Community, Environment, and a Sustainable Future, which critiqued global economics and advocated for a sustainable, ecology-based economics. He wrote extensively on religious pluralism and interfaith dialogue, particularly between Buddhism and Christianity, as well as the need to reconcile religion and science.

Cobb was the co-founder and co-director of the Center for Process Studies in Claremont, California. The Center for Process Studies remains the leading Whitehead-related institute, and has witnessed the launch of more than thirty related centers at academic institutions throughout the world, including twenty-three centers in China.

== Biography ==
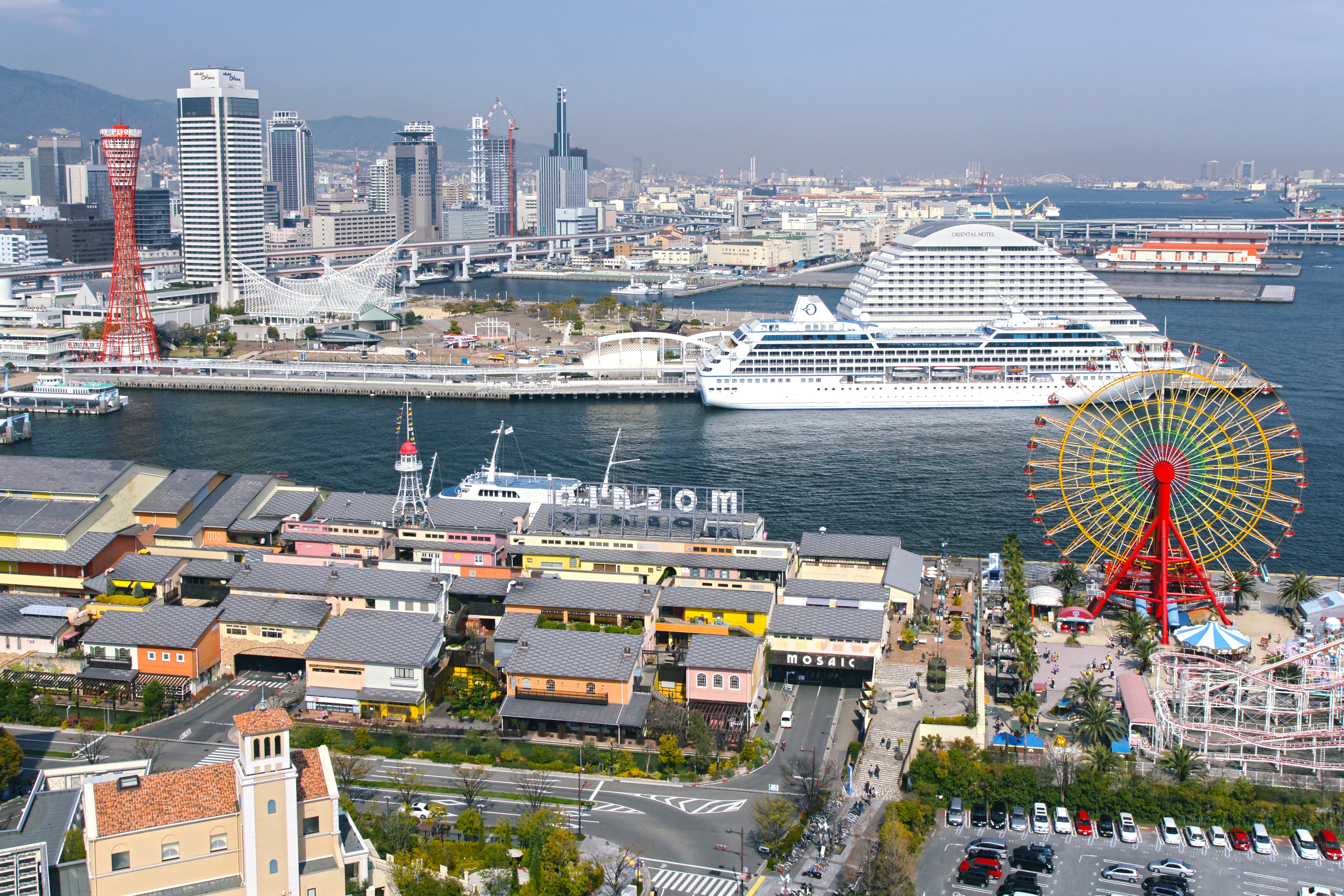
Harborland in Kobe, Hyōgo prefecture, Japan

John Cobb was born in Kobe, Japan, on 9 February 1925, to parents who were Methodist missionaries. Until age 15, he lived primarily in Kobe and Hiroshima and received most of his early education in the multi-ethnic Canadian Academy in Kobe, to which he attributed the beginnings of his pluralistic outlook.

In 1940, Cobb moved to Georgia, US, to finish high school. He found himself both bewildered and disgusted by the pervasive racism in the region, particularly the demonization of the Japanese. Seeing how the same events could be presented in such different ways based on the country in which he was living, Cobb became ever-more counter-cultural and critical of the dominant views in churches, media, universities, and government.

After his graduation from high school, Cobb attended Emory College in Oxford, Georgia, before joining the US Army in 1943. He was chosen for the Japanese language program, which was filled mainly with Jewish and Catholic intellectuals who helped make him aware of the narrow, parochial nature of his Georgia Protestantism.

Cobb served in the occupation of Japan, then returned to the United States and left the army soon afterward. He then entered an interdepartmental program at the University of Chicago in 1947. There, he set out to test his faith by learning the modern world's objections to Christianity:

I was determined to expose my faith to the worst the world could offer. Within six months of such exposure my faith was shattered ... God, who had been my constant companion and Lord up to that point, simply evaporated, and my prayers bounced back from the ceiling unheard.

Hoping to reconstruct a Christian faith more compatible with scientific and historical knowledge, Cobb entered the University of Chicago Divinity School. He was successful in restoring his personal faith primarily with the help of Richard McKeon, Daniel Day Williams, and Charles Hartshorne. McKeon introduced Cobb to philosophical relativism, while Hartshorne and Williams taught him Whiteheadian process philosophy and process theology. Alfred North Whitehead's thought became the central theme of Cobb's own work.

After receiving his PhD degree from the University of Chicago under the supervision of the Divinity School's Dean Bernard Loomer in 1952, he spent three years teaching at Young Harris College in north Georgia, while also serving as part-time pastor to a six-church circuit and establishing a seventh congregation in the area. Ernest Cadman Colwell, formerly president of the University of Chicago, brought Cobb to Emory University in Georgia to teach in the new graduate institute for liberal arts. In 1958, Cobb followed Colwell to Claremont, California, where he was named Ingraham Professor of Theology at Claremont School of Theology and Avery Professor of Religion at Claremont Graduate University. He established the Process Studies journal with Lewis S. Ford in 1971 and co-founded the Center for Process Studies with David Ray Griffin in 1973, making Claremont the center of Whiteheadian process thought. Twenty-five years later, together with Herman Greene, he organized the International Process Network. This organization holds biennial conferences, the tenth of which took place in Claremont in 2015.

During his career, Cobb has also served as visiting professor at Harvard Divinity School, University of Chicago Divinity School, Vanderbilt Divinity School, Iliff School of Theology, Rikkyo University in Japan, and the University of Mainz in Germany. He has received six honorary doctorates.

Cobb died on 26 December 2024, at the age of 99.

== Transdisciplinary work ==
Although Cobb is most often described as a theologian, the overarching tendency of his thought has been toward the integration of many different areas of knowledge, employing Alfred North Whitehead's transdisciplinary philosophical framework as his guiding insight. As a result, Cobb has done work in a broad range of fields.

=== Philosophy of education ===
Cobb consistently opposed the splitting of education and knowledge into discrete and insulated disciplines and departments. He believed that the university model encourages excessive abstraction because each specialized area of study defines its own frame of reference and then tends to ignore the others, discouraging interdisciplinary dialogue and inhibiting a broad understanding of the world.

To combat these problems, Cobb argues that discrete "disciplines" in general—and theology in particular—need to re-emerge from their mutual academic isolation. Theology should once again be tied to ethical questions and practical, everyday concerns, as well as a theoretical understanding of the world. In service to this vision, Cobb consistently sought to integrate knowledge from biology, physics, economics, and other disciplines into his theological and philosophical work.

=== Constructive postmodern philosophy ===
Cobb was convinced that Alfred North Whitehead was right in viewing both nature and human beings as more than just purposeless machines. Rather than seeing nature as purely mechanical and human consciousness as a strange exception which must be explained away, Whiteheadian naturalism went in the opposite direction by arguing that subjective experience of the world should inform a view of the rest of nature as more than just mechanical. In short, nature should be seen as having a subjective and purposive aspect that deserves attention.

Speaking to this need of moving beyond classically "modern" ideas, in the 1960s Cobb was the first to label Whiteheadian thought as "postmodern". Later, when deconstructionists began to describe their thought as "postmodern", Whiteheadians changed their own label to "constructive postmodernism".

Like its deconstructionist counterpart, constructive postmodernism arose partly in response to dissatisfaction with Cartesian mind–matter dualism, which viewed matter as an inert machine and the human mind as wholly different in nature. While modern science has uncovered voluminous evidence against this idea, Cobb argues that dualistic assumptions continue to persist:

On the whole, dualism was accepted by the general culture. To this day it shapes the structure of the university, with its division between the sciences and the humanities. Most people, whether they articulate it or not, view the world given to them in sight and touch as material, while they consider themselves to transcend that purely material status.

While deconstructionists have concluded that we must abandon any further attempts to create a comprehensive vision of the world, Cobb and other constructive postmodernists believe that metaphysics and comprehensive world-models are possible and still needed. In particular, they have argued for a new Whiteheadian metaphysics based on events rather than substances. In this formulation, it is incorrect to say that a person or thing ("substance") has a fundamental identity that remains constant, and that any changes to the person or thing are secondary to what it is. Instead, each moment in a person's life ("event") is seen as a new actuality, thus asserting that continual change and transformation are fundamental, while static identities are far less important. This view more easily reconciles itself with certain findings of modern science, such as evolution and wave–particle duality.

=== Environmental ethics ===
Ecological themes have been pervasive in Cobb's work since 1969, when he turned his attention to the ecological crisis. He became convinced that environmental issues constituted humanity's most pressing problem. Cobb writes:

During the seventies my sense of the theological vocation changed. I did not lose interest in developing the Christian tradition so as to render it intelligible, convincing, and illuminating in a changing context. But I did reject the compartmentalization of my discipline of 'constructive theology,' especially in its separation from ethics, and more generally in its isolation from other academic disciplines ... I was persuaded that no problem could be more critical than that of a decent survival of a humanity that threatened to destroy itself by exhausting and polluting its natural context.

Cobb went on to write the first single-author book in environmental ethics, Is It Too Late? A Theology of Ecology, in 1971. In the book, he argued for an ecological worldview that acknowledges the continuity between human beings and other living things, as well as their mutual dependence. He also proposed that Christianity specifically needed to appropriate knowledge from the biological sciences in order to undercut its anthropocentrism (human-centeredness) and devaluation of the non-human world.

=== Critique of growth-oriented economics ===
Cobb's economic critiques arose as a natural extension of his interest in ecological issues. He recognized that he could not write about an ecological, sustainable, and just society without including discussion of economics.

As part of his investigation into why economic policies so frequently worsened the ecological situation, in the 1980s Cobb decided to re-evaluate gross national product and gross domestic product as measures of economic progress. Together with his son, Clifford Cobb, he developed an alternative model, the Index of Sustainable Economic Welfare, which sought to "consolidate economic, environmental, and social elements into a common framework to show net progress." The name of the metric would later change to genuine progress indicator. A recent (2013) article has shown that global GPI per capita peaked in 1978, meaning that the social and environmental costs of economic growth have outweighed the benefits since that time.

Cobb also co-authored a book with Herman Daly in 1989 entitled For the Common Good: Redirecting the Economy Toward Community, Environment, and a Sustainable Future, which outlined policy changes intended to create a society based on community and ecological balance. In 1992, For the Common Good earned Cobb and Daly the Grawemeyer Award for Ideas Improving World Order.

In his later years, Cobb described growth-oriented economic systems as the "prime example of corruption" in American culture and religion: "Since the rise of modern economics, Christians have been forced to give up their criticism of greed, because the economists said 'greed is good, and if you really want to help people, be as greedy as possible.'" Cobb saw such values as being in direct opposition with the message of Jesus, which in many places explicitly criticizes the accumulation of wealth. Because of Christianity's widespread acceptance of such economic values, Cobb saw Christians as far less confident in proclaiming the values of Jesus.

=== Biology and religion ===
Along with Whitehead, Cobb sought to reconcile science and religion in places where they appear to conflict, as well as to encourage religion to make use of scientific insights and vice versa.

In the area of religion and biology, he co-wrote The Liberation of Life: From the Cell to the Community with Australian geneticist Charles Birch in 1981. The book critiqued the dominant biological model of mechanism, arguing that it leads to the study of organisms in abstraction from their environments. Cobb and Birch argue instead for an "ecological model" which draws no sharp lines between the living and non-living, or between an organism and its environment. The book also argues for an idea of evolution in which adaptive behavior can lead to genetic changes. Cobb and Birch stress that a species "co-evolves with its environment" and that in this way intelligent purpose plays a role in evolution:

Evolution is not a process of ruthless competition directed to some goal of ever-increasing power or complexity. Such an attitude, by failing to be adaptive, is, in fact, not conducive to evolutionary success. A species co-evolves with its environment. Equally, there is no stable, harmonious nature to whose wisdom humanity should simply submit. Intelligent purpose plays a role in adaptive behaviour, and as environments change its role is increased.

The Liberation of Life stresses that all life (not just human life) is purposeful and that it aims for the realization of richer experience. Cobb and Birch develop the idea of "trusting life" as a religious impulse, rather than attempting to achieve a settled, perfected social structure that does not allow for change and evolution.

=== Religious pluralism and interreligious dialogue ===
Cobb participated in extensive interreligious and interfaith dialogue, most notably with Masao Abe, a Japanese Buddhist of the Kyoto School of philosophy. Cobb's explicit aim was to gain ideas and insights from other religions with an eye toward augmenting and "universalizing" Christianity. Cobb writes:

... it is the mission of Christianity to become a universal faith in the sense of taking into itself the alien truths that others have realized. This is no mere matter of addition. It is instead a matter of creative transformation. An untransformed Christianity, that is, a Christianity limited to its own parochial traditions, cannot fulfill its mission of realizing the universal meaning of Jesus Christ.

In short, Cobb’s work does not conceive of dialogue as useful primarily to convert or be converted, but rather as useful in order to transform both parties mutually, allowing for a broadening of ideas and a reimagining of each faith in order that they might better face the challenges of the modern world.

Cobb was active in formulating his own theories of religious pluralism, partly in response to another Claremont Graduate University professor, John Hick. Cobb's pluralism has sometimes been identified as a kind of "deep" pluralism or, alternately, as a "complementary" pluralism. He believes that there are actually three distinct religious ultimates: (1) God, (2) Creativity/Emptiness/Nothingness/Being-itself, and (3) the cosmos/universe. Cobb believed that all of these elements are necessary and present in some form in every religion but that different faiths tend to stress one ultimate over the others. Viewed in this way, different religions may be seen to complement each other by providing insight into different religious ultimates. Cobb's pluralism thus avoids the criticism of conflating religions that are actually very different (for instance, Buddhism and Christianity) while still affirming the possible truths of both.

=== Revitalizing Christianity in a pluralistic world ===
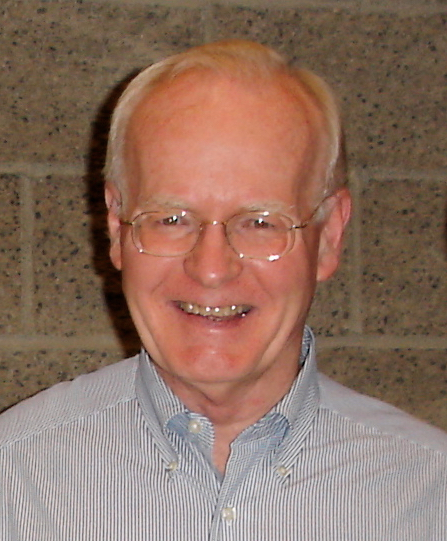
David Ray Griffin, with whom Cobb co-founded the Center for Process Studies in 1973

Cobb believed that through at least the nineteenth century and the first half of the twentieth century, American Protestant theology had been largely derivative from European (specifically German) theology. In the late 1950s, Cobb and Claremont professor James Robinson decided that the time had come to end this one-sidedness and move to authentic dialogue between American and European theologians. To establish real mutuality, they organized a series of conferences of leading theologians in Germany and the United States and published a series of volumes called "New Frontiers in Theology."

After writing several books surveying contemporary forms of Protestantism, Cobb turned in the mid-1960s to more original work which sought to bring Alfred North Whitehead's ideas into the contemporary American Protestant scene. Cobb aimed to reconstruct a Christian vision that was more compatible with modern knowledge and more ready to engage with today's pluralistic world. He did this in a number of ways.

For one, Cobb stressed the problems inherent in what he calls the "substantialist" worldview—ultimately derived from Classical Greek philosophy—that still dominates Christian theology, as well as most of western thought. This "substantialist" way of thinking necessitates a mind–matter dualism, in which matter and mind are two fundamentally different kinds of entities. It also encourages seeing relations between entities as being unimportant to what the entity is "in itself". In contrast to this view, Cobb followed Whitehead in attributing primacy to events and processes rather than substances. In this Whiteheadian view, nothing is contained within its own sharp boundaries. In fact, the way in which a thing relates to other things is what makes it "what it is". Cobb writes:

If the substantialist view is abandoned, a quite different picture emerges. Each occasion of human experience is constituted not only by its incorporation of the cellular occasions of its body but also by its incorporation of aspects of other people. That is, people internally relate to one another. Hence, the character of one's being, moment by moment, is affected by the health and happiness of one's neighbors.

For Cobb, this metaphysics of process is better-aligned with the Bible, which stresses history, community, and the importance of one's neighbors.

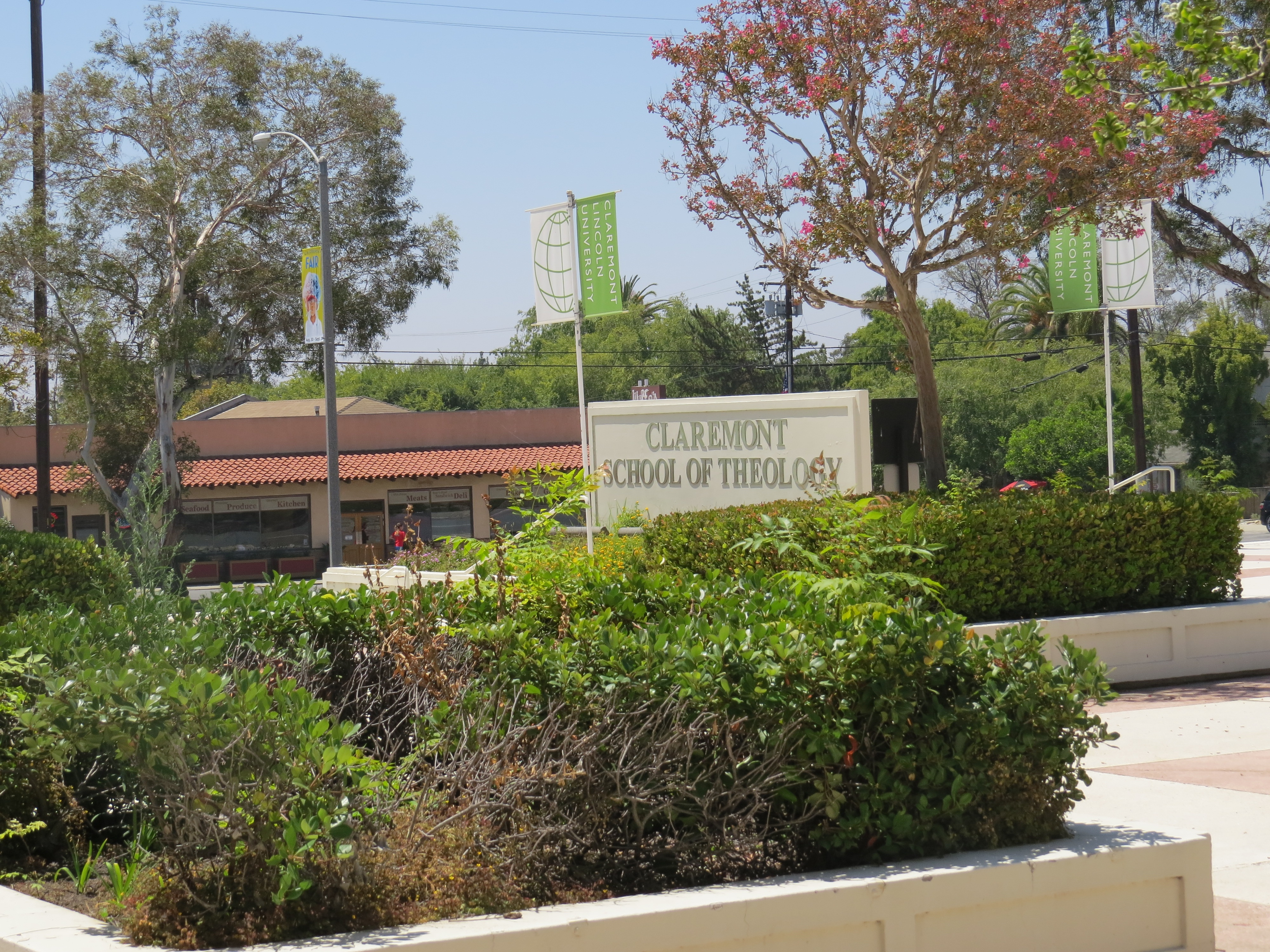
Claremont School of Theology, 2013

Also, instead of turning further inward to preserve a cohesive Christian community, Cobb turned outward in order to discover truths that Christianity may not yet possess. This is in direct opposition to those who feel that Christianity as a religious system is absolutely final, complete, and free of error. Cobb has not only turned to other religions (most notably Buddhism) in order to supplement Christian ideas and systems, but also to other disciplines, including biology, physics, and economics.

In fact, Cobb did not shy away even from re-imaging what is now regarded as the "traditional" Christian notion of God. He did not believe that God is omnipotent in the sense of having unilateral control over all events, since Cobb sees reconciling total coercive power with love and goodness to be an impossible task. Instead, all creatures are viewed as having some degree of freedom that God cannot override. Cobb’s work solves the problem of evil by denying God's omnipotence, stressing instead that God's power is persuasive rather than coercive, that God can influence creatures but not determine what they become or do. For Cobb, God's role is to liberate and empower.

Against traditional theism, Cobb also denied the idea that God is immutable (unchanging) and impassible (unfeeling). Instead, he stresses that God is affected and changed by the actions of creatures, both human and otherwise. For Cobb, the idea that God experiences and changes does not mean that God is imperfect—quite the contrary. Instead, God is seen as experiencing with all beings, and hence understanding and empathizing with all beings, becoming "the fellow sufferer who understands." Cobb argues that this idea of God is more compatible with the Bible, in which Jesus suffers and dies.

Additionally, Cobb's theology argued against the idea of salvation as a singular, binary event in which one is either saved or not saved for all time. Rather than seeing one's time in the world as a test of one's morality in order to enter a heavenly realm, Cobb saw salvation as the continual striving to transform and perfect our experience in this world. Cobb's idea of salvation focuses less on moral categories and more on aesthetic categories—such as a preference for intense experience over dull experience, or beauty rather than ugliness. Cobb writes:

If morality is bound up with contributing to others, the crucial question is: What is to be contributed? One contribution might be making them more moral, and that is fine. But finally, true morality cannot aim simply at the spread of morality. It must aim at the wellbeing of those it tries to help in some broader sense. For process thought that must be the perfection of their experience inclusively.

Cobb admits that the idea of morality being subservient to aesthetics is "shocking to many Christians", yet he argues that there must be more to life than simply being morally good or morally bad and that aesthetic categories fulfill this function specifically because they are defined as goods in themselves.

In later life, Cobb became increasingly distressed by the popular identification of Christianity with the religious right and the weak response of mainstream Protestants. To encourage a stronger response, he organized Progressive Christians Uniting with the Episcopal priest George Regas in 1996, chaired its reflection committee, and edited a number of its books. As the perceived gap between the policies of the American government and Christian teaching grew wider, these books moved beyond simply reformist proposals. The last of these was entitled Resistance: The New Role of Progressive Christians.

In his 2010 book, Spiritual Bankruptcy: A Prophetic Call to Action, Cobb argued against both religiousness and secularism, claiming that what is needed is the secularization of the wisdom traditions.

== The influence of Cobb's thought in China ==
Process philosophy in the tradition of Alfred North Whitehead is often considered a primarily American philosophical movement, but it has spread globally and has been of particular interest to Chinese thinkers. As one of process philosophy's leading figures, Cobb has taken a leadership role in bringing process thought to the East, most specifically to help China develop a more ecological civilization—a goal which the current Chinese government has written into its constitution.

With Zhihe Wang, Cobb founded the Institute for Postmodern Development of China (IPDC) in 2005, and served on its board of directors. Through the IPDC, Cobb helped to coordinate the work of twenty-three collaborative centers in China, as well as to organize annual conferences on ecological civilization.

== Institutions founded ==
Cobb founded numerous non-profit organizations throughout his career.

In 1973, Cobb co-founded the Center for Process Studies with David Ray Griffin as a faculty research center of the Claremont School of Theology, and still served as its Co-Director. The Center for Process Studies is the leading institute on the process philosophy and process theology inspired by Alfred North Whitehead, Charles Hartshorne, and others.

In 1996, Cobb co-founded the Claremont Consultation with George Regas in an effort to organize and mobilize progressive Christian communities. In 2003, the organization's name was changed to Progressive Christians Uniting. PCU today describes itself as "a social justice and faith organization dedicated to amplifying hope and actions individuals can take that lead to a more compassionate and just world."

In 2005, Cobb was the founding President of the Institute for the Postmodern Development of China. The IPDC works to promote new modes of development in China and the West, drawing from both classical Chinese philosophy and constructive forms of Western thought in order to address practical problems associated with economic growth, social change, and globalization. Cobb continued to work on the IPDC's board of directors.

In 2013, Cobb was a founding board member of Process Century Press, an academic press dedicated to transdisciplinary applications of process thought. He remained on PCP's advisory board.

In 2014, Cobb was the founding chairperson of the board for Pando Populus, an LA-based non-profit organization that seeks to enact a more ecologically balanced way of life in the LA area. Cobb remained on Pando Populus' board of directors.

In 2015, Cobb was a founding board member of the Institute for Ecological Civilization (EcoCiv), a non-profit organization which seeks to enact "a fully sustainable human society in harmony with surrounding ecosystems and communities of life." Cobb remained on EcoCiv's board of directors.

In 2019, Cobb led the formation and was a founding board member of the Claremont Institute for Process Studies, a non-profit organization that aims to "promote a process-relational worldview to advance wisdom, harmony, and the common good" by engaging "in local initiatives and cultivates compassionate communities to bring about an ecological civilization." One year later, the organization was renamed the Cobb Institute to honor his life, leadership, and influence, and to better align its work and mission with its name. Cobb continued to be an active board member and guiding influence.

In 2021, several individuals supportive of Cobb's works on environmental issues celebrated his 97th birthday by establishing the Living Earth Movement. The nonprofit organization's two-fold mission is to get the U.S. and China to cooperate for the sake of all life on this planet and to promote the foundations for a new kind of ecological civilization in which humans would learn to value and cooperate with the rest of the ecosphere.

== Bibliography ==
=== Books written ===
- Varieties of Protestantism, 1960
- Living Options in Protestant Theology, 1962 (online edition)
- A Christian Natural Theology, 1965 (online edition)
- The Structure of Christian Existence, 1967 (online edition)
- God and the World, 1969
- Is It Too Late? A Theology of Ecology, 1971 (revised edition, 1995)
- Liberal Christianity at the Crossroads, 1973 (online edition)
- Christ in a Pluralistic Age, 1975
- with David Ray Griffin, Process Theology: An Introductory Exposition, 1976, ISBN 0-664-24743-1
- Theology and Pastoral Care, 1977
- with Charles Birch, The Liberation of Life: from the Cell to the Community, 1981
- Process Theology as Political Theology, 1982 (online edition)
- Beyond Dialogue: Toward a Mutual Transformation of Christianity and Buddhism, 1982
- with David Tracy, Talking About God, 1983 (online edition)
- Praying for Jennifer, 1985
- with Joseph Hough, Christian Identity and Theological Education, 1985
- with Beardslee, Lull, Pregeant, Weeden, and Woodbridge, Biblical Preaching on the Death of Jesus, 1989
- with Herman Daly, For the Common Good: Redirecting the Economy Toward Community, Environment, and a Sustainable Future, 1989 (revised edition, 1994) which won the 1992 University of Louisville Grawemeyer Award for Ideas Improving World Order.
- Doubting Thomas, 1990, ISBN 0-8245-1033-X (online edition)
- with Leonard Swidler, Paul Knitter, and Monika Helwig, Death or Dialogue, 1990
- Matters of Life and Death, 1991
- Can Christ Become Good News Again?, 1991
- Sustainability, 1992
- Becoming a Thinking Christian, 1993
- Lay Theology, 1994, ISBN 0-8272-2122-3
- Sustaining the Common Good, 1994, ISBN 0-8298-1010-2
- Grace and Responsibility, 1995
- Reclaiming the Church, 1997, ISBN 0-664-25720-8
- The Earthist Challenge to Economism: A Theological Critique of the World Bank, 1999, ISBN 0-312-21838-9
- Transforming Christianity and the World: A Way Beyond Absolutism and Relativism, 1999, ISBN 1-57075-271-0
- Postmodernism and Public Policy: Reframing Religion, Culture, Education, Sexuality, Class, Race, Politics, and the Economy, 2002, ISBN 0-7914-5166-6
- The Process Perspective: Frequently Asked Questions About Process Theology (edited by Jeanyne B. Slettom), 2003, ISBN 0-8272-2999-2
- Romans (with David J. Lull), 2005
- with Bruce Epperly and Paul Nancarrow, The Call of the Spirit: Process Spirituality in a Relational World, 2005
- A Christian Natural Theology, Second Edition, 2007
- Whitehead Word Book: A Glossary with Alphabetical Index to Technical Terms in Process and Reality, 2008 ISBN 978-0-9742459-6-6
- Spiritual Bankruptcy: A Prophetic Call to Action, 2010
- The Process Perspective II (edited by Jeanyne B. Slettom), 2011
- Theological Reminiscences, 2014
- Jesus' Abba – The God Who Has Not Failed, 2015
- China and Ecological Civilization: John B. Cobb, Jr. in conversation with Andre Vltchek, 2019, ISBN 978-6025095450
- Confessions, John B. Cobb, Jr. 2023

=== Books edited ===
- with James Robinson, The Later Heidegger and Theology, 1963
- with James Robinson, The New Hermeneutic, 1964
- with James Robinson, Theology as History, 1967
- The Theology of Altizer: Critique and Response, 1971
- with David Ray Griffin, Mind in Nature, 1977 (online edition)
- with Widick Schroeder, Process Philosophy and Social Thought, 1981
- with Franklin Gamwell, Existence and Actuality: Conversations with Charles Hartshorne, 1984 (online edition)
- Christian Faith and Religious Diversity: Mobilization for the Human Family, 2002, ISBN 0-8006-3483-7
- with Christopher Ives, The Emptying God: A Buddhist-Jewish-Christian Conversation, Wipf & Stock Publishers, 2005, ISBN 1-59752-421-2
- with Kevin Barrett and Sandra Lubarsky, 9/11 & American Empire: Christians, Jews, and Muslims Speak Out, 2006, ISBN 1-56656-660-6
- Resistance: The New Role of Progressive Christians. Louisville, Kentucky: Westminster John Knox Press, 2008. ISBN 978-0-664-23287-0
- Back to Darwin, 2008
- Dialogue Comes of Age, 2010
- Religions in the Making: Whitehead and the Wisdom Traditions of the World, 2012
- with Ignacio Castuera, For Our Common Home: Process-Relational Responses to Laudato Si', 2015
- with Wm. Andrew Schwartz, Putting Philosophy to Work: Toward an Ecological Civilization, 2018

=== Articles ===
For a list of Cobb's published articles through 2010, see the list at The Center for Process Studies.

== See also ==
- Ingersoll Lectures on Human Immortality
- Progressive Christianity

Academic offices
Preceded by Robert Jay Lifton	Ingersoll Lecturer on Human Immortality; 1987	Succeeded by Wilfred Cantwell Smith
Awards
Preceded by World Commission on Environment and Development	Grawemeyer Award for Ideas Improving World Order; 1992; With: Samuel P. Huntington; Herman Daly	Succeeded by Donald Akenson
