= David A. Pailin =

British philosopher and theologian (born 1936)

David Arthur Pailin (1936–2021) graduated from Trinity College and became a leading British philosopher and theologian. He wrote numerous books, mostly in the 1980s and 1990s. He eventually became head of the Department of Philosophy of the University of Manchester.

In his work, he "took a critical realist approach to theology, with particular attention to the possibility of reconstructing a theism that is both credible and significant." One reviewer wrote of his last collection of essays, 1994's Probing the Foundations: A study in Theistic Reconstruction: "The influence of process theology in Europe is restricted to some individuals. David Pailin, professor of philosophy of religion in the University of Manchester, is one of the most important of these."

== Books ==
- Attitudes to Other Religions: Comparative Religion in Seventeenth and Eighteenth Century Britain (1984)
- Groundwork of Philosophy of Religion (1986)
- God and the Processes of Reality (1989)
- The Anthropological Character of Theology (1990)
- A Gentle Touch: From a Theology of Handicap to a Theology of Human Being (1992)
- Probing the Foundations: A study in Theistic Reconstruction (1994)
