= Jay McDaniel =

American philosopher and theologian

Jay B. McDaniel
- Education: Vanderbilt University; Claremont Graduate University
- Occupation: Professor of Religion
- Website: openhorizons.org

Jay B. McDaniel is an American philosopher and theologian. He specializes in Buddhism, Whiteheadian process philosophy and process theology, constructive theology, ecotheology, interfaith dialogue, and spirituality in an age of consumerism. His current interest is "to see how these myriad concerns might unfold in China".

In addition to publishing numerous books and articles, McDaniel is an active voices for process philosophy and theology on social media. He runs a blog called [www.openhorizons.org "Open Horizons"], formerly "Jesus, Jazz, and Buddhism", whose aim is "to offer ideas that might help people create multi-cultural, interfaith communities that are creative, compassionate, participatory, ecologically wise, and spiritually enjoyable". He also created a series of YouTube videos on process thought. He's also a consultant for the China Project of the Center for Process Studies in Claremont, California, and a member of the advisory board of the Institute for Postmodern Development of China.

He earned a B.A. in English literature and Philosophy from Vanderbilt University and a Ph.D. in Philosophy of Religion and Theology from Claremont Graduate University.

== Published works ==
- Of God and Pelicans: A Theology of Reverence for Life. Louisville: Westminster/John Knox Press, 1989.
- With Roots and Wings: Christianity in an Age of Ecology and Dialogue. Maryknoll: Orbis Books, 1995.
- Living from the Center. St. Louis: Chalice Press, 2000.
- Gandhi’s Hope: Learning from Other Religions as a Path to Peace. Maryknoll: Orbis Books, 2005.
- Earth, Sky, Gods and Mortals: Developing an Ecological Spirituality. Wipf and Stock Publishers, 2009.
- The Taoist Christian: following Jesus in a gentle and creative way, a collaboration with Bruce G. Epperly
