= The New Pearl Harbor =

2004 book written by David Ray Griffin

The New Pearl Harbor: Disturbing Questions About the Bush Administration and 9/11
- Author: David Ray Griffin
- Language: English
- Genre: Non-fiction
- Publication date: 2004

The New Pearl Harbor: Disturbing Questions About the Bush Administration and 9/11 (2004) is a book written by David Ray Griffin, a retired professor of philosophy at the Claremont School of Theology. It draws analogies between the September 11 attacks and the attack on Pearl Harbor in 1941. The title is taken from the 2000 paper "Rebuilding America's Defenses" produced by the Project for the New American Century, which asserted that only a "new Pearl Harbor" would enable the military and defense policy transformations the group desired to rapidly take place.

The book was included in the official selection of 99 books made available to all members of 9/11 Commission and was found on Osama bin Laden's bookshelf during the raid.

== Content ==
In the book, Griffin presents pieces of evidence and arguments which he believes support a conclusion that the George W. Bush administration was complicit in the September 11, 2001, attacks, and therefore constituted a false flag incident.

The foreword was written by Richard A. Falk, professor emeritus at Princeton University.

Part One of the book looks at the events of 9/11, discussing each Flight in turn and also the behavior of President George W. Bush and his Secret Service protection. Part Two examines 9/11 in a wider context, in the form of four "disturbing questions":

- Did US Officials have advance information about 9/11?
- Did US Officials obstruct investigations prior to 9/11?
- Did US Officials have reasons for allowing 9/11?
- Did US Officials block captures and investigations after 9/11?

== Critical response ==
Chip Berlet, a critic of the book, argues that many of its claims are easily refuted and that there are many leaps of logic. Griffin rejects such criticisms and has debated Berlet.

According to former Central Intelligence Agency (CIA) agent Robert Baer, writing in The Nation magazine:

What's notable about Griffin's take on these events is how easily he leaps to larger evils, a conspiracy at the top. Griffin is a thoughtful, well-informed theologian who before September 11 probably would not have gone anywhere near a conspiracy theory. But the catastrophic failures of that awful day are so implausible and the lies about Iraq so blatant, he feels he has no choice but to recycle some of the wilder conspiracy theories, several of which were popularized by Thierry Meyssan in L'Effroyable Imposture (9/11: The Big Lie), a bestseller in France.

Baer adds that Griffin's subtitle, Disturbing Questions About the Bush Administration and 9/11, "suggests this book is a search for truth, but don't let that fool you. His mind is all but made up."

In January 2002, Baer wrote about the events of the September 11, 2001 terrorist attacks in The Guardian "[D]id bin Laden act alone, through his own al-Qaida network, in launching the attacks? About that I'm far more certain and emphatic: no." He later stated, "For the record, I don't believe that the World Trade Center was brought down by our own explosives, or that a rocket, rather than an airliner, hit the Pentagon. I spent a career in the CIA trying to orchestrate plots, wasn't all that good at it, and certainly couldn't carry off 9/11. Nor could the real pros I had the pleasure to work with."

== See also ==
- 9/11 conspiracy theories
- 9/11 Truth Movement
- Project for the New American Century
