= William E. Kaufman =

American rabbi (born 1938)

William E. Kaufman (born December 28, 1938) is an American Conservative rabbi, philosopher, theologian and author. His 1991 book, The Case for God, was perhaps the first book written on Jewish process theology.

== Early life and education ==
Kaufman was born in Philadelphia, Pennsylvania. He is the son of the late Harry Kaufman and Elizabeth (Slodovsky) Kaufman. He was a Phi Beta Kappa graduate of the University of Pennsylvania in 1959 with an undergraduate major in philosophy. Kaufman was ordained as a rabbi by the Jewish Theological Seminary in 1964. He received his Ph.D. in philosophy from Boston University in 1971. He received a Doctor of Divinity honorary degree from the Jewish Theological Seminary in 1990.

== Rabbinic career and personal life ==
From 1964 to 1967, he was assistant rabbi at Congregation Kehillath Israel in Brookline, Massachusetts. In 1967, he assumed the rabbinical post at Congregation B’nai Israel in Woonsocket, Rhode Island, where he served until 1980. From 1980 to 1982, he was rabbi at Congregation Agudas Achim in San Antonio, Texas. In 1982 he was installed as rabbi at Temple Beth El in Fall River, Massachusetts, where he served until his retirement in November 2005. Upon his retirement, he was named rabbi emeritus of Temple Beth El.

Kaufman is a member of the Rabbinical Assembly, the international rabbinical association of Conservative Judaism.

Kaufman married the former Nathalie Ann Levin of Brookline, Massachusetts in 1965. They have a son, Ari, a daughter, Beth, and four grandchildren: Maisie, Josephine (Josie), Gabriel and Ryan.

== Works ==
Kaufman has published many articles in Judaism (quarterly journal), Conservative Judaism (quarterly journal), The Reconstructionist (quarterly journal), and The Jewish Spectator (quarterly journal.)

One of his projects has been to create a Jewish process theology, viewing Jewish theology through the panentheistic process philosophy of Alfred North Whitehead.

== Bibliography ==
- Kaufman, William E. (1976). Contemporary Jewish Philosophies. Wayne State University Press. ISBN 0-8143-2429-0.
- Kaufman, William E. (1980). Journeys: An introductory guide to Jewish Mysticism. Bloch Pub. Co. ISBN 0-8197-0482-2. "William E. Kaufman."
- Kaufman, William E. (1991). The Case for God. Chalice Press. ISBN 0-8272-0458-2.
- Kaufman, William E.; Shor, Morton (1994). A Question of Faith: An atheist and a rabbi debate the existence of God. Jason Aronson Inc. ISBN 1-56821-089-2. "William E. Kaufman."
- Kaufman, William E. (1996). John Wild: From Realism to Phenomenology. P. Lang. ISBN 0-8204-2796-9.
- Kaufman, William E. (1997). The Evolving God in Jewish Process Theology. Edwin Mellen Press. ISBN 0-7734-8648-8.
- Metaphors for God: A Response Conservative Judaism (journal), Volume 51, No. 2, 1999, The Rabbinical Assembly.
- Kaufman, William E. (2014). A Jewish philosophical response to the new atheists - Dawkins, Dennett, Harris and Hitchens. Lewiston, New York: Edwin Mellen Press. ISBN 9780773400641.
