= Bruce G. Epperly =

American theologian born in 1952

Bruce Gordon Epperly (born 1952 in California) is a theologian, minister, and author. He is one of the leading process theologians in the United States, having studied with John B. Cobb at Claremont Graduate University. Epperly currently serves as Professor of Practical Theology and Director of Continuing Education at Lancaster Theological Seminary. He is an ordained minister with standing in the United Church of Christ and Christian Church (Disciples of Christ).

Prior to his current appointment, Epperly served as Director of the Protestant Ministry and adjunct professor in Theology, Spirituality, and Medicine at Georgetown University.

His professional interests are broad and include process theology, constructive postmodernism, spirituality, healing, and ministerial transformation. He is noted for innovative work in joining theological reflection with spiritual formation, ministerial leadership, and healing ministry.

He is the author, or co-author, of sixteen books, including Tending to the Holy: The Practice of the Presence of God in Ministry, the Academy of Parish Clergy's 2009 Book of the Year, and Holy Adventure: 41 Days of Audacious Living, his response to Rick Warren's Purpose Driven Life.

== Published works ==
- Tending to the Holy: The Practice of the Presence of God in Ministry, with Kate Epperly. Herndon, VA: Alban Institute, 2009.
- The Four Seasons of Ministry, with Kate Epperly. Herndon, VA: Alban Institute, 2008. ISBN 978-1-56699-366-1.
- Holy Adventure: Forty One Days of Audacious Living. Nashville: Upper Room, 2008. ISBN 978-0-8358-9970-3.
- Feed the Fire: Avoiding Burnout in Ministry, with Kate Epperly. Cleveland: Pilgrim Press, 2008. ISBN 978-0-8298-1795-9.
- Healing Worship: Purpose and Practice. Cleveland: Pilgrim Press, 2006. ISBN 978-0-8298-1742-3.
- Reiki Healing Touch and the Way of Jesus, with Kate Epperly. Kelowna, British Columbia: Wood Lake/Northstone Books, 2005. ISBN 978-1-896836-75-1.
- The Call of the Spirit: Process Spirituality in the Contemporary World, with John B. Cobb and Paul Nancarrow. Claremont, CA: Process and Faith Press, 2005. ISBN 978-0-9742459-3-5.
- Finding Angels in Boulders: Jewish-Christian Reflections on Death and Grief, with Rabbi Lewis Solomon. St. Louis: Chalice Press, 2005. ISBN 978-0-8272-1036-3.
- Walking in the Light: Jewish and Christian Reflections on Health and Spirituality, with Rabbi Lewis Solomon. St. Louis: Chalice Press, 2004. ISBN 978-0-8272-4249-4.
- Mending the World: Spiritual Hope for Ourselves and Our Planet, with Rabbi Lewis Solomon. Minneapolis: Augsburg Press/Innisfree Press, 2002. ISBN 978-0-8066-9033-9.
- The Power of Affirmative Faith: A Spirituality of Personal Transformation. St. Louis: Chalice Press, 2001. ISBN 978-0-8272-2968-6.
- God’s Touch: Faith, Wholeness, and the Healings of Jesus. Louisville: Westminster/John Knox Press, 2001. ISBN 978-0-664-22281-9.
- The Transforming Moment: A Lenten Devotional for College Students. New York: Higher Education Ministry Associates, 1999. (re-released, 2009)
- Spirituality and Health, Health and Spirituality: A New Journey of Spirit, Mind, and Body. Mystic, CT: Twenty-third Publications, 1997. ISBN 978-0-89622-723-1.
- Crystal and Cross: Christianity and the New Age in Creative Dialogue. Mystic: CT: Twenty-third Publications, 1996. ISBN 978-0-89622-683-8.
- At the Edges of Life: A Holistic Vision of the Human Adventure. St. Louis: Chalice Press, 1992. ISBN 978-0-8272-0020-3.
- Seeking the Spirit in Sexuality for Patheos
- Making Sense of Miracles for Patheos
- The Taoist Christian: following Jesus in a gentle and creative way, a collaboration with Jay McDaniel.

== See also ==
- Postmodern Christianity
