= C. Robert Mesle =

- Born: Charles Robert Mesle c. 1950

Academic background
- Education: Graceland University; University of Chicago; Northwestern University
- Thesis: Power and Value in Process Philosophy and Theology (1980)
- Influences: John B. Cobb

Academic work
- Discipline: Theology
- School or tradition: Process theology
- Institutions: Graceland University

Charles Robert Mesle (born c. 1950) is an American process theologian and was professor of philosophy and religion at Graceland University in Lamoni, Iowa, until his retirement in 2016. After earning a Bachelor of Arts degree in religion at Graceland University (1972) and a Master of Arts degree in Christian theology at University of Chicago Divinity School (1975), Mesle received a Doctor of Philosophy degree in philosophy and religion from Northwestern University (1980).

Mesle is the author of Process Theology: A Basic Introduction. In this book he outlines three attributes of a process theology. There is a relational character to the divine such as:

- God experiences both the joy and suffering of humanity.
- God is not omnipotent in the classical sense
- God exercises relational power and not unilateral control.

In chapter 17, he formulates a process naturalism. As a naturalist his religious view is one without a divine being. There is only the finite world. His process naturalism shares with process theism recognition of the ambiguity of Existence. It also has virtually every value and ethical standard in common with process theism and religious in this respect. Consequently, Mesle is a religious naturalist.

== Works ==
- Process-Relational Philosophy: An Introduction to Alfred North Whitehead. Templeton Foundation Press, 2008.
- Theology 9: Process Theology and Religious Pluralism, Co-editor, with Joni Wilson, Graceland Press, 2002, and published in Korean, 2003.
- Theology V: The Jesus Seminar (editor) "Preface" & "Jesus the Challenge," Graceland/Park Press, Independence, MO 1998.
- Process Theology: A Basic Introduction, with a concluding chapter by John B. Cobb, Jr., Chalice Press, 1993.
- John Hick's Theodicy, with a response by John Hick, Macmillan in the UK and St. Martin's in the US, 1991.
- The Bible as Story and Struggle, Herald House, 1989.
- Fire In My Loins: A Study in Faith and Belief, Herald House, 1984

== See also ==
- Christian theology
- Theopoetics
