= Frank Ebersole =

American poet (1919–2009)

Frank B. Ebersole (1919–2009) was an American philosopher who developed a unique form of ordinary language philosophy.

== Biography ==
Frank B. Ebersole was born in Indiana. He majored in zoology at Heidelberg College (now Heidelberg University (Ohio)). After years as a philosophy graduate student at Yale University, he transferred to the University of Chicago, where he worked with Rudolf Carnap, one of the founders of logical analysis, and with Charles Hartshorne, an advocate of process philosophy and a theorist of physiological psychology. Ebersole received his Ph.D. in philosophy from the University of Chicago in 1947 (He also won the 1945 Fiske Poetry Prize). His dissertation was entitled "Biology and the theory of knowledge : an analytical method for the theory of knowledge, and its relation to biological laws." The thesis contains 7 chapters: I. Determination of the subject and Method II. Relations of Truth and Knowledge: Logic and Epistemology III. The Order of Knowledge and the Phenomenally Given IV. Causal Deliverances in the Given, and the Memory Premiss V. Analysis and the A Priori VI. Special Problems Concerning Memory; Polemic and; VII. Summary of the Main Argument. The thesis starts with general discussion of theory of knowledge (epistemology) and how knowledge must be founded in the "phenomenally given" on page 48 it states, "Here we have if anywhere the foundation of the order of knowledge, in knowledge of the phenomenally given." From that point, Ebersole goes on to examine memory in Ch. IV and the relationship of Biology to questions in theory of knowledge. Ending with problems of memory concerning other areas of philosophy and science. Ebersole later directly challenges these ideas concerning memory and the "phenomenally given" in his book, "Things We Know."

Ebersole taught philosophy at colleges and universities, including Carleton, Oberlin, San Jose State, Stanford, and Alberta, but most of his academic career was at the University of Oregon, where he was department chairman and director of graduate studies. He published essays in a number of journals, however, many of his essays were not accepted for journal publication and are available only in his three self-published books: Things We Know (2001), Meaning and Saying (2002), and Language and Perception (2002).

Besides his involvement with philosophical issues, he was a photographer, and author of two books of poetry (Many Times of Year and Song of the Crow).

== Philosophy ==
Initially Ebersole was interested in philosophers who brought a zoological perspective to their philosophy (Henri Bergson, Alfred North Whitehead, and Charles Hartshorne, for example). He also was influenced by ideas of logical analysis (especially as practised by his teacher Rudolf Carnap). In the early 1950s he read Ludwig Wittgenstein's Blue Book and Philosophical Investigations, and this changed his direction considerably:

Like many another I was once committed to a certain type of philosophical endeavor—a type that goes under the names of "linguistic analysis" or "conceptual analysis". ... Then I read Wittgenstein. My first reaction was to add footnotes to the things I had been writing. Then I added appendices. Finally I tore the things up; and I have been trying in various ways ever since to overcome a state of paralysis, without success.

By the later 1950s Ebersole found a new way in philosophy, partly stimulated by the thinking of Wittgenstein and the writings of other early ordinary language philosophers. In 1957 he read his first paper based on his new thinking; it was about Descartes's dream argument.

Ebersole's work from his mature period (available in his three books) "requires—and often succeeds in producing—a radical reorientation of one's thinking". Ebersole's essays give form to his personal struggles with philosophical problems. In most of the essays he attempts to remove crustations from traditional philosophical ideas so that he can identify and address the central issues underlying a philosophical problem from his own personal point of view. Often he contrasts the philosophical conception of words that are central to a philosophical problem with examples of how these same words are used in the context of ordinary (non-philosophical) discourse. Using examples, he reveals significant differences between the ways we think when we are in the grip of a philosophical problem and when we are not so gripped. Ebersole concludes that philosophical problems often arise from philosophers' tendency to think in terms of philosophy.

He has written mainly on topics in epistemology, metaphysics, and the philosophy of language. Ebersole is generally taken to be part of the school of ordinary language philosophy and he argues in several essays that two main critics of ordinary language philosophy (Paul Grice and John R. Searle) pose questions raised by the robust form of ordinary language philosophy he practiced. For an appraisal of Ebersole's work, see Don S. Levi's paper Ebersole's Philosophical Treasure Hunt. His writing is unconventional in style and content, as he acknowledges in this excerpt from one of his poems:

People stopped and puzzled when I talked,
wondered what to make of
anything I said.
And if I made them ask themselves
What of heads or tails to make
of a philosopher's talking,
that was a good thing I did,
I would say.
Yes, I would say that.

— From the poem "Conversation with a Dead Philosopher", Many Times of Year, pp. 51–52

== See also ==
- American philosophy
- List of American philosophers
