= David Ray Griffin =

American philosopher (1939–2022)

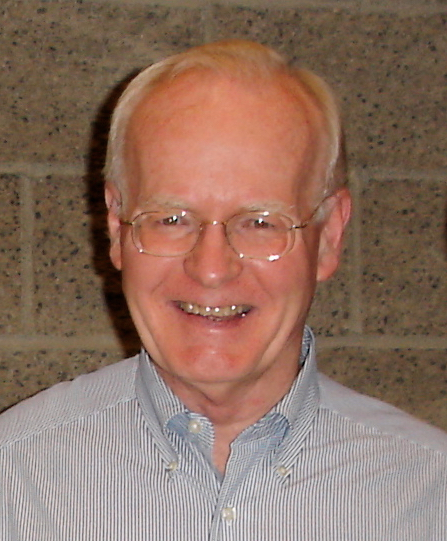
- Griffin in 2006
- Born: August 8, 1939; Wilbur, Washington, U.S.
- Died: November 25, 2022 (aged 83)

Philosophical work
- Era: 20th-century philosophy
- Region: Western philosophy
- School: Process theology
- Doctoral students: Thomas Jay Oord
- Main interests: Ontology epistemology theology 9/11 conspiracy theories

David Ray Griffin (August 8, 1939 – November 25, 2022) was an American professor of philosophy of religion and theology and a 9/11 conspiracy theorist. Along with John B. Cobb, Jr., he founded the Center for Process Studies in 1973, a research center of Claremont School of Theology that promotes process thought. Griffin published numerous books about the September 11 attacks, claiming that elements of the Bush administration were involved. An advocate of the controlled demolition conspiracy theory, he was a founding member of Scholars for 9/11 Truth.

== Life and professional career ==
Griffin was born on August 8, 1939. He was raised in a small town in Oregon, where he was an active participant in his Disciples of Christ church. After deciding to become a minister, Griffin entered Northwest Christian College but became disenchanted with the conservative-fundamentalist theology taught there. While pursuing his master's degree in counseling from the University of Oregon, Griffin attended a lecture series delivered by Paul Tillich at the Graduate Theological Union in Berkeley, California. At that time, Griffin decided to focus on philosophical theology. He eventually attended the Claremont Graduate University, from which Griffin received his PhD in 1970.

As a student in Claremont, Griffin was initially interested in Eastern religions, particularly Vedanta. However, he started to become a process theologian while attending John B. Cobb's seminar on Alfred North Whitehead's philosophy. According to Griffin, process theology, as presented by Cobb, "provided a way between the old supernaturalism, according to which God miraculously interrupted the normal causal processes now and then, and a view according to which God is something like a cosmic hydraulic jack, exerting the same pressure always and everywhere (which described rather aptly the position to which I had come)" (Primordial Truth and Postmodern Theology). Griffin applied Alfred North Whitehead's thought to the traditional theological subjects of christology and theodicy and argued that process theology also provided a sound basis for addressing contemporary social and ecological issues. Griffin's process theology is founded on the process philosophy of Whitehead and Charles Hartshorne.

After teaching theology and Eastern religions at the University of Dayton, Griffin came to appreciate the distinctively postmodern aspects of Whitehead's thought. In particular, Griffin found Whitehead's nonsensationist epistemology and panexperientialist ontology immensely helpful in addressing the major problems of modern philosophy, including the problems of mind-body interaction, the interaction between free and determined things, the emergence of experience from nonexperiencing matter, and the emergence of time in the evolutionary process. In 1973, Griffin returned to Claremont to establish, with Cobb, the Center for Process Studies at the Claremont School of Theology.

While on research leave in 1980–81 at Cambridge University and Berkeley, the contrast between modernity and postmodernity became central to Griffin's work. He has attempted to develop postmodern proposals for overcoming the conflicts between religion and modern science. Griffin came to believe that much of the tension between religion and science was not only the result of reactionary supernaturalism but also the mechanistic worldview associated with the rise of modern science in the seventeenth century. In 1983, Griffin established the Center for a Postmodern World in Santa Barbara and became editor of the SUNY Series in Constructive Postmodern Philosophy between 1987 and 2004.

Griffin was a full-time academic from 1973 until April 2004 and was a co-director of the Center for Process Studies. He was a longtime resident of Santa Barbara, California.

== Statements and publications on the September 11 attacks ==
Following the September 11 attacks, David Ray Griffin shifted his focus from questions of philosophy and religion to ones of politics and history, specifically American expansionism and imperialism. He intended to write a book on the subject, presenting 9/11 in terms of "blowback" for aggressive United States foreign policies of the 20th century.

Until the spring of 2003, I had not looked at any of the evidence. I was vaguely aware there were people, at least on the internet, who were offering evidence against the official account of 9/11... I knew that the US government had fabricated "incidents" as an excuse to go to war several times before. Nevertheless... I did not take this possibility seriously... I was so confident that they must be wrong.

After reading the work of Paul Thompson and Nafeez Mosaddeq Ahmed, he became convinced that there was a prima facie case for the contention that there must have been complicity from individuals within the United States government. It was then that he set about writing his first book on the topic, The New Pearl Harbor: Disturbing Questions About the Bush Administration and 9/11 (2004), in which he called for a more extensive investigation than that performed by the 9/11 Commission. The book has been described by Peter Barber of the Financial Times as "a touchstone in the 9/11 Truth movement".

Part One of the book looks at the events of 9/11, discussing each flight in turn and also the behaviour of President George W. Bush and his Secret Service protection. Part Two examines 9/11 in a wider context, in the form of four "disturbing questions". David Ray Griffin discussed this book and the claims within it in an interview with Nick Welsh, reported under the headline Thinking Unthinkable Thoughts: Theologian Charges White House Complicity in 9/11 Attack.

The activist Chip Berlet wrote that claims in the book have been refuted by independent experts. Griffin debated Berlet on Democracy Now! defending his claims.

Griffin's second book on the subject, published in 2005, was a critique of the 9/11 Commission Report called The 9/11 Commission Report: Omissions and Distortions (2005). Griffin's article "The 9/11 Commission Report: A 571-page Lie" summarizes this book, presenting 115 allegations of what Griffin claims are either omissions or distortions of evidence, stating that "the entire Report is constructed in support of one big lie: that the official story about 9/11 is true."

In his next book, Christian Faith and the Truth Behind 9/11: A Call to Reflection and Action (2006), he summarized some of what he believed was evidence for government complicity and reflected on its implications for Christians. The Presbyterian Publishing Corporation, publishers of the book, described Griffin as being a distinguished theologian and praised the book's religious content, but said, "The board believes the conspiracy theory is spurious and based on questionable research."

In 2006, Griffin, along with Peter Dale Scott, edited 9/11 and the American Empire: Intellectuals Speak Out, a collection of essays including Steven Jones' paper Why Indeed Did The World Trade Center Towers Collapse?. Debunking 9/11 Debunking (2007) disputed at the rhetorical level the debunking of 9/11 conspiracy theories in such venues such as Popular Mechanics. In 9/11 Contradictions: An Open Letter to Congress and the Press (2008), Griffin presented chapters on 25 alleged contradictions involving elements of the "accepted story" of 9/11 and called for Congress and the press to investigate and resolve them.

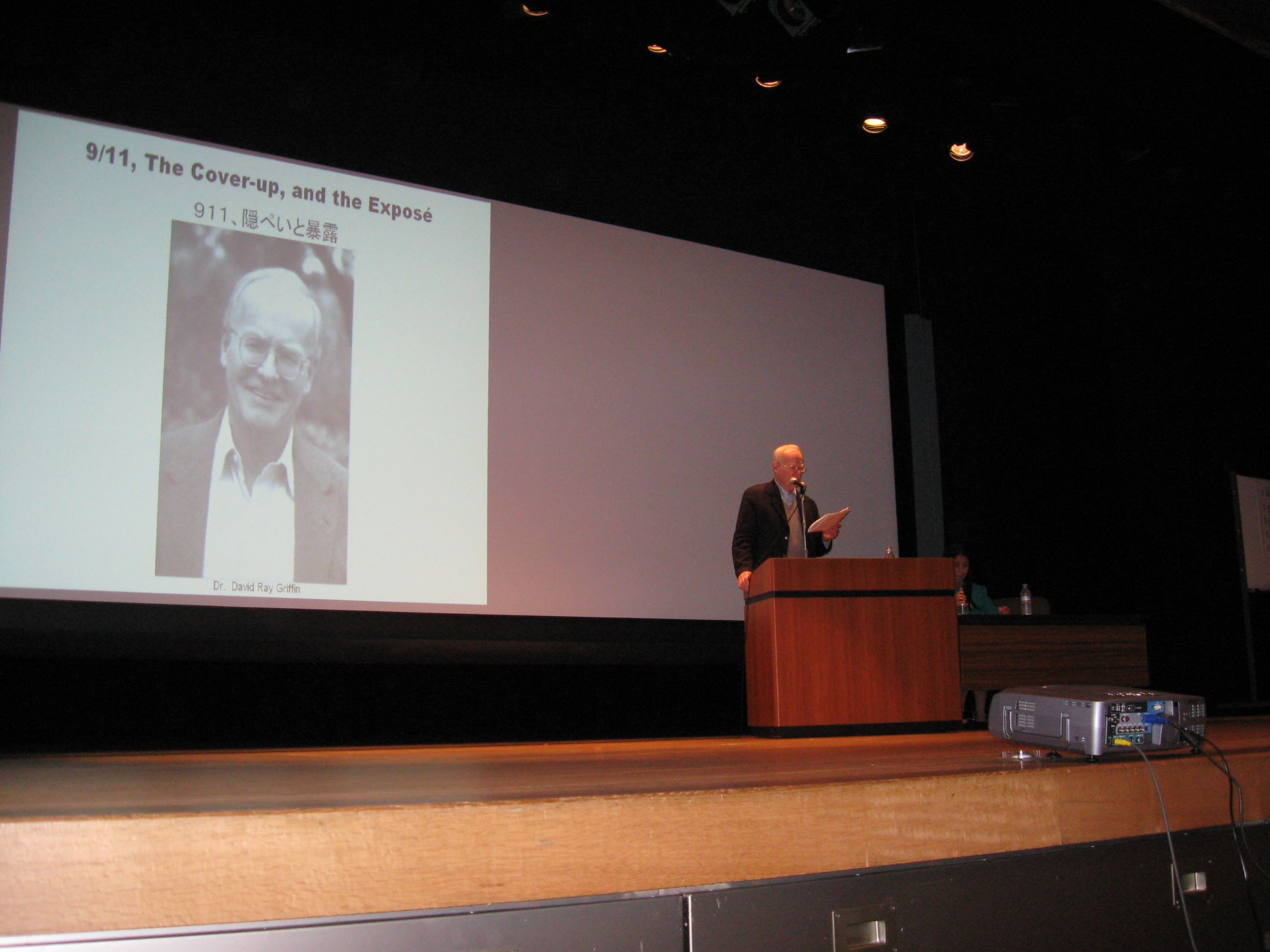
David Ray Griffin in Nagoya, Japan

Griffin delivered several lectures and was interviewed by Alex Jones on his radio show featuring 9/11 conspiracy theories. A lecture entitled 9/11 and American Empire: How should religious people respond?, delivered on April 18, 2005 at the University of Wisconsin–Madison, was aired by C-SPAN. At the end of one of his lectures entitled 9/11: The Myth and the Reality, Griffin was asked why a theologian would be one of the primary speakers for the cause (of questioning the official version of events), and was asked to explain whether he saw any religious or spiritual implications of 9/11, to which he replied: "If the religions of the world are correct ... the Divine cares about ... the long-term good of the world ... and wouldn't want ... nuclear wars that would decimate all life on the planet, wouldn't want global warming to continue ... So I'm convinced that this administration ... is the most dangerous administration we've ever had for the future of this country and the future of the world, and if trying to save god's planet is not a religious issue, I wouldn't know what was."

In a review published in The Nation, former Central Intelligence Agency agent Robert Baer dismissed the gist of Griffin's writings as one in a long line of conspiracy theories about national tragedies but stated that the Bush administration had created a climate of secrecy and mistrust that helped generate such explanations. In the review, Baer said:

As more facts emerge about September 11, many of Griffin's questions should be answered, but his suspicions will never be put to rest as long as the Bush Administration refuses to explain why it dragged this country into the most senseless war in its history. Until then, otherwise reasonable Americans will believe the Bush Administration benefited from 9/11, and there will always be a question about what really happened on that day.

David Aaronovitch, in the London Times in 2008, wrote: "Griffin believes that no plane hit the Pentagon (despite hundreds of people seeing it) and that the World Trade Centre was brought down by a controlled demolition. There isn't a single point of alleged fact upon which Griffin's barking theory hasn't itself been demolished."

== Philosophical and theological work ==
The theologian Gary Dorrien has said about Griffin:

No one better represents the intellectual ambition of process theology than David Griffin. He has surpassed everyone in challenging the materialistic, atheistic modernism of the academy, and his work is prolific and wide-ranging to the point of being impossible to summarize.

=== Unsnarling the World-Knot ===
In his 1998 book, Unsnarling the World-Knot: Consciousness, Freedom, and the Mind-Body Problem, Griffin addresses what he says "has arguably been the central problem in modern philosophy since its inception in the seventeenth century," namely, the mind–body problem. Griffin attempts to resolve this problem in two ways, first by providing an exhaustive critique of contemporary discussions of the problem (e.g., Thomas Nagel, John Searle, Galen Strawsen, Colin McGinn, Geoffrey Madell, Karl Popper, Jaegwon Kim, and Owen Flanagan) and then providing an “alternative for 'fully naturalizing’ the mind' based upon the process metaphysics of Alfred North Whitehead and Charles Hartshorne.” Griffin's alternative rejects the metaphysical assumption shared by dualism and materialism that matter is insentient arguing that this shared assumption about matter leads to apparently unresolvable problems such as how experience arose out of non-experiencing natural entities or how conscious experience can be described in physicalist terms. Griffin proposes instead that all genuine actual entities (i.e., not aggregates like rocks or chairs, etc.) are events that have some degree of experience that includes both physical (objective) and mental (subjective) elements. This is a version of panpsychism but one in which consciousness is not central, rather consciousness “emerges in degrees of complexity from a rudimentary sentience that pervades the whole of nature.” The better term, according to Griffin, is “panexperientialism.”

=== Common sense beliefs ===
The notion of a class of "privileged" common sense beliefs, what Griffin calls "hard-core common sense" beliefs, was important to Griffin's thought at least since the mid-1980's and was always part of his understanding of what he calls "constructive postmodernism." By the end of the 1990s, however, "it was the centerpiece of his argument." According to Griffin, unlike most ordinary (i.e., soft-core) common sense beliefs which in fact "are theory-laden products of prior conceptual and cultural systems", "certain common presumptions are universally presupposed in practice even when they are denied in theory." Put otherwise, such hard-core common sense beliefs "cannot be denied verbally without self-contradiction." Examples of such beliefs are:

One assumes causality in the act of causing one's self or others to doubt causality; one uses one's freedom in the act of renouncing the idea of freedom; even professed solipsists assume an actual world when they drive a car or question the existence of others.

While there have been historical precedents for Griffin's notion of hard-core common sense beliefs (e.g., Thomas Reid and Charles Peirce), the root of Griffin's position is Whitehead's declaration in Process and Reality "that all thinking must bow to the presuppositions that are necessary 'for the regulation of our lives' and that all 'such presumptions are imperative in experience.'" Accordingly, for Griffin, "[t]he ultimate test of any philosophical position is whether it does justice to the hard-core ideas that are inevitably presupposed in practice by all human beings." Despite their philosophical importance to Griffin, however, he believes that the "precise formulations of hard-core ideas are always fallible" and so must "function not as a foundation upon which all other beliefs are to be built but as a compass telling us when we have gotten off course."

=== Parapsychology ===
Griffin wrote two books dealing with parapsychology: Parapsychology, Philosophy and Spirituality: A Postmodern Exploration and James and Whitehead on Life After Death. Griffin recognized that by taking parapsychology seriously, he was at odds with the majority of scientific discussions of parapsychology. For example, Paul R. Gross, Norman Levitt, and Martin W. Lewis assert that, "The overwhelming majority of scientists consider parapsychology, by whatever name, to be pseudoscience." Griffin proposed that the explanation for this majority opinion lies in a shared late modern worldview, which assumes materialism and rejects action at a distance, rather than from fair and impartial examination of the evidence. According to Griffin, "Intellectuals who share this ... materialistic worldview more typically reject the evidence [for paranormal phenomenon] out of hand, either by refusing to examine it or by attacking the credibility of those reporting it ...". Parapsychology, if genuine, provides dramatic evidence against the late modern worldview; however, Griffin points out, besides parapsychology, materialistic atheism, when consistent, also "rules out not only a (nonmaterial) mind but also those things often called 'values,' such as truth, beauty, and goodness.". Griffin states that the evidence from parapsychology as well as the persistent belief in these other values have led to a "growing realization that [the] late modern worldview is ... inadequate intellectually." His judgement was that people should move to a postmodern worldview that can consistently and coherently recognize the possibility of paranormal events as well as the reality of intellectual, moral, and esthetic norms. Griffin argued that Whitehead's philosophy provides just such a postmodern philosophy.

== Death ==
Griffin died on November 25, 2022, at the age of 83, from cancer.

== Books ==
=== About philosophy, theology, and religion ===
- A Process Christology, Westminster Press, 1973, ISBN 0-664-20978-5
- Process Theology: An Introductory Exposition, with John B. Cobb, Philadelphia: Westminster Press, 1976, ISBN 0-664-24743-1
- John Cobb's Theology in Process, Westminster John Knox Press, 1977, ISBN 0-664-21292-1
- Process and Reality: An Essay in Cosmology, co-edited with Donald W. Sherburne, Free Press; 2nd edition, 1979, ISBN 0-02-934570-7
- Physics and the Ultimate Significance of Time: Bohm, Prigogine and Process Philosophy, State University of New York Press, 1986, ISBN 0-88706-115-X
- The Reenchantment of Science: Postmodern Proposals (Suny Series in Constructive Postmodern Thought), State University of New York Press, 1988, ISBN 0-88706-784-0
- Spirituality and Society: Postmodern Visions (Suny Series in Constructive Postmodern Thought), State University of New York Press, 1988, ISBN 0-88706-853-7
- Varieties of Postmodern Theology (Suny Series in Constructive Postmodern Thought), State University of New York Press, 1989, ISBN 0-7914-0050-6
- God and Religion in the Postmodern World: Essays in Postmodern Theology (Constructive Postmodern Thought), State University of New York Press, 1989, ISBN 0-88706-929-0
- Archetypal Process: Self and Divine in Whitehead, Jung, and Hillman, Northwestern University Press, 1990, ISBN 0-8101-0815-1
- Sacred Interconnections: Postmodern Spirituality, Political Economy and Art (SUNY Series in Constructive Postmodern Thought), State University of New York Press, 1990, ISBN 0-7914-0231-2
- Primordial Truth and Postmodern Theology (Suny Series in Constructive Postmodern Thought), State University of New York Press, 1990, ISBN 0-7914-0198-7
- God, Power, and Evil: A Process Theodicy, University Press of America, 1991, ISBN 0-8191-7687-7
- Evil Revisited: Responses and Reconsiderations, State University of New York Press, 1991, ISBN 0-7914-0612-1
- Theology and the University: Essays in Honor of John B. Cobb, co-edited with Joseph C. Hough Jr., State University of New York Press, 1991, ISBN 0-7914-0592-3
- Founders of Constructive Postmodern Philosophy: Peirce, James, Bergson, Whitehead, and Hartshorne (SUNY Series in Constructive Postmodern Thought), State University of New York Press, 1993, ISBN 0-7914-1333-0
- Postmodern Politics for a Planet in Crisis: Policy, Process, and Presidential Vision (SUNY Series in Constructive Postmodern Thought), State University of New York Press, 1993, ISBN 0-7914-1485-X
- Jewish Theology and Process Thought (Suny Series in Constructive Postmodern Thought), State University of New York Press, 1996, ISBN 0-7914-2810-9
- Parapsychology, Philosophy, and Spirituality: A Postmodern Exploration (SUNY Series in Constructive Postmodern Thought), State University of New York Press, 1997, ISBN 0-7914-3315-3
- Reenchantment Without Supernaturalism: A Process Philosophy of Religion (Cornell Studies in the Philosophy of Religion), Cornell University Press, 2000, ISBN 0-8014-3778-4
- Religion and Scientific Naturalism: Overcoming the Conflicts (SUNY Series in Constructive Postmodern Thought), State University of New York Press, 2000, ISBN 0-7914-4563-1
- Process Theology and the Christian Good News: A Response to Classical Free Will Theism in 'Searching for an Adequate God: A Dialogue between Process and Free Will Theists', Cobb and Pinnock (editors), Wm. B. Eerdmans Publishing, 2000, ISBN 0-8028-4739-0
- Two Great Truths: A New Synthesis of Scientific Naturalism and Christian Faith, Westminster John Knox Press, 2004, ISBN 0-664-22773-2
- Deep Religious Pluralism, Westminster John Knox Press, 2005, ISBN 0-664-22914-X
- Whitehead's Radically Different Postmodern Philosophy: An Argument for Its Contemporary Relevance (SUNY Series in Philosophy), State University of New York Press, 2007, ISBN 0-7914-7049-0
- Unsnarling the World-Knot: Consciousness, Freedom, and the Mind-Body Problem, Wipf and Stock Publishers, 2007, ISBN 978-1-55635-755-8
- Panentheism and Scientific Naturalism: Rethinking Evil, Morality, Religious Experience, Religious Pluralism, and the Academic Study of Religion, Claremont, Process Century Press, 2014, ISBN 1-9404-4703-8
- Physics and Speculative Philosophy: Potentiality in Modern Science, co-edited with Timothy E. Eastman and Michael Epperson, De Gruyter, 2016, ISBN 3-1104-4975-7
- The Christian Gospel for Americans: A Systematic Theology, Anoka (Minnesota): Process Century Press, 2019, ISBN 1-9404-4742-9

=== About the September 11 attacks and U.S. foreign policy ===
- The New Pearl Harbor: Disturbing Questions About the Bush Administration and 9-11, Olive Branch Press, 2004, ISBN 1-56656-552-9
- The 9/11 Commission Report: Omissions and Distortions, Olive Branch Press, 2004, ISBN 1-56656-584-7
- Christian Faith and the Truth Behind 9/11: A Call to Reflection and Action, Westminster John Knox Press, 2006, ISBN 0-664-23117-9
- The American Empire and the Commonwealth of God: A Political, Economic, Religious Statement, with John B. Cobb, Richard A. Falk and Catherine Keller, Westminster John Knox Press, 2006, ISBN 0-664-23009-1
- 9/11 and American Empire: Intellectuals Speak Out, Vol. 1, editor, with Peter Dale Scott, Olive Branch Press, 2006, ISBN 1-56656-659-2
- Debunking 9/11 Debunking: An Answer to Popular Mechanics and Other Defenders of the Official Conspiracy Theory (Revised & Updated Edition), Olive Branch Press, Paperback: 392 pages, March 2007, ISBN 1-56656-686-X
- 9/11 Contradictions: An Open Letter to Congress and the Press, Interlink Publishing Group, March 2008, ISBN 1-56656-716-5
- New Pearl Harbor Revisited: 9/11, the Cover-up and the Exposé, Olive Branch Press, September 2008, ISBN 1-56656-729-7
- Osama bin Laden: Dead or Alive?, Olive Branch Press, May 2009, ISBN 1-56656-783-1; Arris Books UK, July 2009, ISBN 1-84437-081-X
- The Mysterious Collapse of World Trade Center 7: Why the Final Official Report About 9/11 Is Unscientific and False, Interlink Publishing, September 2009, ISBN 1-56656-786-6; Arris Books UK, September 2009, ISBN 1-84437-083-6
- Cognitive Infiltration: An Obama Appointee's Plan to Undermine the 9/11 Conspiracy Theory, Olive Branch Press, September 2010
- 9/11 Ten Years Later: When State Crimes Against Democracy Succeed, Olive Branch Press, September 6, 2011, ISBN 978-1-56656-868-5
- Bush and Cheney: How They Ruined America and the World, Olive Branch Press/Interlink, 2017, ISBN 1-56656-061-6
- The American Trajectory: Divine or Demonic?, Clarity Press, 2018, ISBN 0-9986947-9-7
- America on the Brink: How US Foreign Policy Led to the War in Ukraine, Clarity Press, 2023

=== About the work of David Ray Griffin ===
- Reason and Reenchantment: The Philosophical, Religious and Political Thought of David Ray Griffin, John B. Cobb - Richard Falk - Catherine Keller (eds.), Process Century Press, 2013, ISBN 1-94044-700-3
