= Gerald Birney Smith =

Gerald Birney Smith (May 3, 1868 – April 2, 1929) was a Christian author, educator, and administrator at the Chicago School.

He was born in Middlefield, Massachusetts and attended Brown university in 1891. He taught at Oberlin Academy, Worcester Academy, and was an active educator his entire life. While at the University of Chicago, when Shailer Mathews was absent Smith would take up duties of Dean of the department.

He wrote about topics such as Nature worship and also edited the American Journal of Theology and the Journal of Religion.

== Works ==
- Christianity and Critical Theology
- A Dictionary of Religion and Ethics
- The Function of a Critical Theology
- The Nature of Science and of Religion and their Interrelation
- The Problem of Theological Method
- Social Idealism and the Changing Theology
- The Realities of the Christian Religion
- The Christ of Faith and the Jesus of History
- What Shall the Systematic Theologian Expect from the New Testament Scholar?
- Christianity and the Spirit of Democracy
- Democracy and Religious Experience
- Christianity and Political Democracy
- Making Christianity Safe for Democracy
- The Task of the Church in a Democratic Age
- Religious Significance of Jesus's Humanity
- The Christ of Faith and the Jesus of History
