= Dipolar theism =

In process theology, dipolar theism is the position that to conceive a perfect God, one must conceive him as embodying the "good" in sometimes-opposing characteristics; therefore, such a deity cannot be understood to embody only one set of characteristics.

== Overview ==
For instance, here are some characteristics commonly associated with God:

One — Many
Transcendent — Immanent
Eternal — Temporal
Mutable — Immutable
Merciful — Just
Simple — Complex

Dipolar theism holds that in each pair, both of the characteristics contain some element of good. To embody all perfections, therefore, God must embody the good in both characteristics, and cannot be limited to one, because a God limited to one would suffer the limits of the one, and lack the good in the other.

For instance, there is a "good" in being just, and also a good in being merciful. In being just, God determines that the good are rewarded and the evil are punished. In being merciful, God forgives those who sin. It follows, therefore, that a God that was only just or only merciful would be less than perfect. Dipolar theism holds that a perfect God must embody the good in both of those characteristics. Thus, a perfect God has the "good" characteristics of justice and the good characteristics of mercy.

Alternatively, there is good in having absolute power, and good in leading by persuasion. For a God to be perfect, he cannot rule solely by predestination, because then he would lack the good possessed by a God who led by persuasion. God must therefore embody the "good" in both power and persuasion. From this conclusion, some reject the existence of an omnipotent God.

== Critique of dipolar theism ==
Those rejecting dipolar theism argue that it fails to distinguish between what we think God is and what God actually is. Just because we think God should be a certain way to embody our idea of perfection does not mean God embodies those characteristics in reality.

This critique is analogous to the critique of Anselm's ontological argument by Gaunilo: "Just because I can imagine a perfect island does not mean that it actually exists. Things are what they are no matter what I think they should be."

== See also ==
- Charles Hartshorne
