= Monica Coleman =

American theologian

The Reverend Doctor Monica A. Coleman
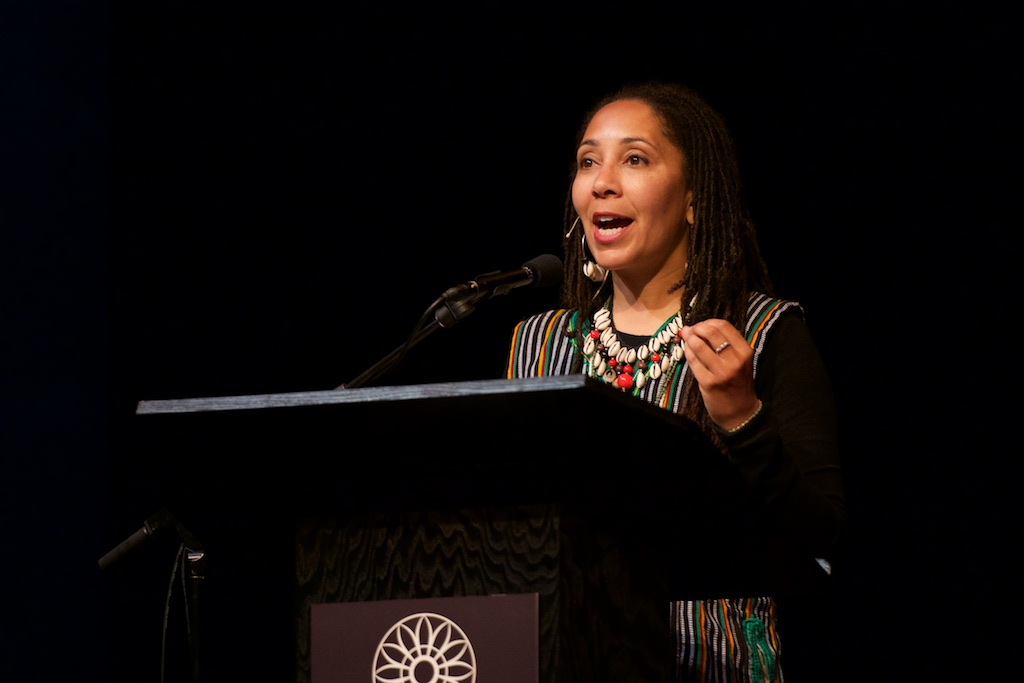
- Coleman in 2018
- Born: 1974 (age 51–52); Ann Arbor, Michigan

Academic background
- Education: Harvard-Radcliffe College Vanderbilt University Divinity School Claremont Graduate University

Academic work
- Discipline: Process theology, womanist theology
- Institutions: University of Delaware

Monica A. Coleman (born 1974) is a contemporary theologian associated with process theology and womanist theology. She is currently Professor of Africana Studies and the John and Patricia Cochran Scholar for Inclusive Excellence at the University of Delaware, as well as the Faculty Co-Director Emerita for the Center for Process Studies. Her research interests include Whiteheadian metaphysics, constructive theology, philosophical theology, metaphorical theology, black and womanist theologies, African American religions, African traditional religions, theology and sexual and domestic violence, and mental health and theology. Coleman is an ordained elder in the African Methodist Episcopal Church.

== Education ==
Coleman grew up in Ann Arbor, Michigan, where she graduated from Greenhills School.

Coleman earned her bachelor's degree in Afro-American Studies from Harvard-Radcliffe College in 1995, her Master of Divinity and Certificate in Religion, Gender, and Sexuality from Vanderbilt University Divinity School in 1998, and both her Master of Arts and PhD in Philosophy of Religion and Theology from Claremont Graduate University in 2004.

== Ministry ==
Monica Coleman accepted a call to ministry at nineteen years of age. She is an ordained elder in the African Methodist Episcopal Church.

Part of Coleman's work has been training church staff and congregants on how to care for and support individuals who have experienced sexual violence. While she was a student at Vanderbilt University Divinity School in 1997, she created a ministry focused on sexual assault called "The Dinah Project" at Metropolitan Interdenominational Church in Nashville, Tennessee.

In 2004, Coleman published The Dinah Project: A Handbook for Congregational Response to Sexual Violence. This work provides personal narrative about being a survival of sexual assault while also offering a resource guide to assist churches in caring for those who have experienced sexual violence.

Coleman has written about her mental health journey in a spiritual memoir titled Bipolar Faith: a Black Woman’s Journey with Depression and Faith.

== Academic career ==
Since 2019, Monica Coleman has worked as a Professor of Africana Studies at the University of Delaware. In 2020, Coleman became the Coordinator of the African American Public Humanities Initiative at the University of Delaware.

In 2004, after completing her PhD at Claremont Graduate University, Coleman became an assistant professor of religion at Bennett College in Greensboro, North Carolina. Coleman served as the Director of the Womanist Religious Program at Bennett. After two years, Coleman accepted the role of assistant professor of systematic theology at Luther School of Theology at Chicago. In 2008, she returned to Claremont, California to serve in the role of assistant professor of religion at the Claremont Graduate University. She became a professor of constructive theology and African American theology at Claremont School of Theology. Coleman taught at Claremont for ten years. It was during her time at Claremont that she became co-director of the Center for Process Studies. Coleman made another career move to become Professor of Africana Studies and Director of Graduate Studies at the University of Delaware in 2019.

Coleman's work and pedagogy examines African American religious pluralism through lived experiences seen in memoirs and texts outside of what are traditionally considered in the study of religious pluralism. She discusses that the theology, culture, spirituality, and the communal contributions of religious differences of African Americans are not included in most conversations about religious pluralism in the West. She maintains that those who study religion would gain a richer understanding of pluralism and religious differences in their contexts by learning about African American pluralism.

== Authored and edited works ==
- The Dinah Project: A Handbook for Congregational Response to Sexual Violence. Pilgrim Press, 2004.
- Making a Way Out of No Way: A Womanist Theology. Minneapolis: Fortress Press, 2008.
- Creating Women's Theology: A Movement Engaging Process Theology (edited with Nancy Howell and Helene Tallon Russell). Eugene, OR: Pickwick, 2011.
- Not Alone: Reflections on Faith and Depression - A 40-Day Devotional. Culver City, CA: Inner Prizes Inc, 2012.
- Ain't I A Womanist, Too?: Third Wave Womanist Religious Thought, (edited). Minneapolis: Fortress Press, 2013.
- Bipolar Faith: a Black Woman's Journey with Depression and Faith. Minneapolis: Fortress Press, 2016.
