= Nancy Frankenberry =

American philosopher of religion

Nancy K. Frankenberry (born 1947) is an American philosopher of religion, currently John Phillips Professor Emeritus at Dartmouth College.

== Books ==
- Religion and Radical Empiricism (1987)
- Interpreting Neville (1999)
- Language, Truth, and Religious Belief (1999)
- Radical Interpretation in Religion (2002)
- The Faith of Scientists: In Their Own Words (2008)
