= Daniel Day Williams =

Process theologian, professor, and author (1910–1973)

Daniel Day Williams (1910 – December, 1973) was a process theologian, professor, and author. He served on the joint faculty of the University of Chicago and the Chicago Theological Seminary, and later at Union Theological Seminary in New York City. Williams was a member of the United Church of Christ.

== Works ==
- God's Grace and Man's Hope, Harper & Row, 1949 (Rauschenbush Lectureship), reprint 1965, online edition
- What Present-Day Theologians Are Thinking, Harper & Brothers, 1952, revised ed. 1959, 3rd ed. 1967, Greenwood Publications revised ed. 1978: ISBN 0-313-20587-6
- Basic Christian Affirmations, National Council of Churches, 1953
- Christian Teaching and Christian Beliefs, United Church Board for Homeland Ministries, 1955
- The Advancement of Theological Education, with H. Richard Niebuhr and James Gustafson, Harper & Brothers, 1955, published online as The Purpose of the Church and its Ministry
- The Ministry in Historical Perspectives, edited with H. Richard Niebuhr, Harper & Brothers, 1956, online edition
- The Family Learns About Jesus, Pilgrim Press, 1960
- The Minister and the Care of Souls, Harper, 1961, online edition
- The New Life in Christ: The meaning and experience of continuing redemption, 1965
- Spirit and the Forms of Love, Harper & Row, 1968, University Press of America 1981 reprint, ISBN 0-8191-1692-0 online edition
- The Andover Liberals;: A Study in American Theology, Octagon Press, 1970
- Essays in Process Theology, edited with Perry D. LeFevre, Exploration Press 1985, ISBN 0-913552-25-9
