= Process theology =

Type of theology

Process theology is a type of theology developed from Alfred North Whitehead's (1861–1947) process philosophy, but most notably by Charles Hartshorne (1897–2000), John B. Cobb (1925–2024), and Eugene H. Peters (1929–1983). Process theology and process philosophy are collectively referred to as "process thought".

For both Whitehead and Hartshorne, it is an essential attribute of God to affect and be affected by temporal processes, contrary to the forms of theism that hold God to be in all respects non-temporal (eternal), unchanging (immutable), and unaffected by the world (impassible). Process theology does not deny that God is in some respects eternal (will never die), immutable (in the sense that God is unchangingly good), and impassible (in the sense that God's eternal aspect is unaffected by actuality), but it contradicts the classical view by insisting that God is in some respects temporal, mutable, and passible.

According to Cobb, "process theology may refer to all forms of theology that emphasize event, occurrence, or becoming over substance. In this sense theology influenced by G. W. F. Hegel is process theology just as much as that influenced by Whitehead. This use of the term calls attention to affinities between these otherwise quite different traditions." Pierre Teilhard de Chardin can also be included among process theologians, even if they are generally understood as referring to the Whiteheadian/Hartshornean school, where there continue to be ongoing debates within the field on the nature of God, the relationship of God and the world, and immortality.

== History ==
Various theological and philosophical aspects have been expanded and developed by Charles Hartshorne (1897–2000), John B. Cobb, Eugene H. Peters, and David Ray Griffin. A characteristic of process theology each of these thinkers shared was a rejection of metaphysics that privilege existence over becoming, particularly those of Aristotle and Thomas Aquinas. Hartshorne was deeply influenced by French philosopher Jules Lequier and by Swiss philosopher Charles Secrétan who were probably the first ones to claim that in God liberty of becoming is above his substantiality.

Process theology soon influenced a number of Rabbinic Jewish theologians, including rabbis Max Kadushin, Milton Steinberg, Levi Olan, Harry Slominsky, and, to a lesser degree, Abraham Joshua Heschel. Contemporary Jewish theologians who advocate some form of process theology include Bradley Shavit Artson, Lawrence A. Englander, William E. Kaufman, Harold Kushner, Anson Laytner, Michael Lerner, Sandra Lubarsky, Gilbert S. Rosenthal, Lawrence Troster, Donald B. Rossoff, Burton Mindick, and Nahum Ward-Lev.

Alan Anderson and Deb Whitehouse applied process theology to the New Thought movement in Christianity.

== God and the World relationship ==
Whitehead's classical statement is a set of antithetical statements that attempt to avoid self-contradiction by shifting them from a set of oppositions into a contrast:

- It is as true to say that God is permanent and the World fluent, as that the World is permanent and God is fluent.
- It is as true to say that God is one and the World many, as that the World is one and God many.
- It is as true to say that, in comparison with the World, God is actual eminently, as that, in comparison with God, the World is actual eminently.
- It is as true to say that the World is immanent in God, as that God is immanent in the World.
- It is as true to say that God transcends the World, as that the World transcends God.
- It is as true to say that God creates the World, as that the World creates God.

== Themes ==
- God is not omnipotent in the sense of being coercive. The divine has the power of persuasion rather than coercion. Process theologians interpret the classical doctrine of omnipotence as involving force and suggest a forbearance in divine power instead. "Persuasion" in the causal sense means that God does not exert unilateral control.
- Reality is not made up of material substances that endure through time but serially ordered, experiential events. These events have both a physical and mental aspect. All experiences (male, female, atomic, and botanical) are important and contribute to reality's ongoing and interrelated process.
- The universe is characterized by process and change carried out by the agents of free will. Self-determination characterizes everything in the universe, not just human beings. God cannot totally control any series of events or individuals, but God influences the creaturely exercise of this universal free will by offering possibilities. To say it another way, God has a will in everything, but not everything that occurs is God's will.
- God contains the universe but is not identical with it (panentheism, not pantheism or pandeism). Some also call this "theocosmocentrism" to emphasize that God has always been related to some world or another.
- Because God interacts with the changing universe, God is changeable (that is to say, God is affected by the actions that take place in the universe) over time. However, the abstract elements of God (goodness, wisdom, etc.) remain eternally solid.
- Charles Hartshorne believes that people do not experience subjective (or personal) immortality, but they do have objective immortality because their experiences live on forever in God, who contains all that was. Other process theologians believe that people do have subjective experiences after bodily death.
- Dipolar theism is the idea that God has both a changing aspect (God's existence as a Living God) and an unchanging aspect (God's eternal essence).

== Relationship to liberation theology ==
Henry Young combines black theology and process theology in his book Hope in Process. Young seeks a model for American society that goes beyond the alternatives of integration of blacks into white society and black separateness. He finds useful the process model of the many becoming one. Here the one is a new reality that emerges from the discrete contributions of the many, not the assimilation of the many to an already established one.

Monica Coleman has combined womanist theology and process theology in her book Making a Way Out of No Way. In it, she argues that 'making a way out of no way' and 'creative transformation' are complementary insights from the respective theological traditions. She is one of many theologians who identify both as a process theologian and feminist/womanist/ecofeminist theologian, which includes persons such as Sallie McFague, Rosemary Radford Ruether, Catherine Keller, and Marjorie Hewitt Suchocki.

C. Robert Mesle, in his book Process Theology, outlines three aspects of a process theology of liberation:

1. There is a relational character to the divine which allows God to experience both the joy and suffering of humanity. God suffers just as those who experience oppression and God seeks to actualize all positive and beautiful potentials. God must, therefore, be in solidarity with the oppressed and must also work for their liberation.
2. God is not omnipotent in the classical sense and so God does not provide support for the status quo, but rather seeks the actualization of greater good.
3. God exercises relational power and not unilateral control. In this way God cannot instantly end evil and oppression in the world. God works in relational ways to help guide persons to liberation.

== Relationship to pluralism ==
Process theology affirms that God is working in all persons to actualize potentialities. In that sense each religious manifestation is the Divine working in a unique way to bring out the beautiful and the good. Additionally, scripture and religion represent human interpretations of the divine. In this sense pluralism is the expression of the diversity of cultural backgrounds and assumptions that people use to approach the Divine.

== Relationship to the doctrine of the incarnation ==
Contrary to Christian orthodoxy, the Christ of mainstream process theology is not the mystical and historically unique union of divine and human natures in one hypostasis, the eternal Logos of God incarnated and identifiable as the man Jesus. Rather, God is incarnate in the lives of all people when they act according to a call from God. Jesus fully and in every way responded to God's call; thus, the person of Jesus is theologically understood as "the divine Word in human form." Jesus is not singularly or essentially God, but he was perfectly in sync with God at all moments of his life.

Cobb expressed the Incarnation in process terms that link it to his understanding of actualization of human potential: "'Christ' refers to the Logos as incarnate hence as the process of creative transformation in and of the world".

== Debate about process theology's conception of God's power ==
A criticism of process theology is that it offers a too severely diminished conception of God's power. Process theologians argue that God does not have unilateral, coercive control over everything in the universe. In process theology, God cannot override a person's freedom, nor perform miracles that violate the laws of nature, nor perform physical actions such as causing or halting a flood or an avalanche. Critics argue that this conception diminishes divine power to such a degree that God is no longer worshipful.

The process theology response to this criticism is that the traditional Christian conception of God is actually not worshipful as it stands, and that the traditional notion of God's omnipotence fails to make sense.

First, power is a relational concept. It is not exerted in a vacuum, but always by some entity A over some other entity B. As such, power requires analysis of both the being exerting power, and the being that power is being exerted upon. To suppose that an entity A (in this case, God), can always successfully control any other entity B is to say, in effect, that B does not exist as a free and individual being in any meaningful sense, since there is no possibility of its resisting A if A should decide to press the issue.

Mindful of this, process theology makes several important distinctions between different kinds of power. The first distinction is between "coercive" power and "persuasive" power. Coercive power is the kind that is exerted by one physical body over another, such as one billiard ball hitting another, or one arm twisting another. Lifeless bodies (such as the billiard balls) cannot resist such applications of physical force at all, and even living bodies (like arms) can only resist so far, and can be coercively overpowered. While finite, physical creatures can exert coercive power over one another in this way, God—lacking a physical body—cannot (not merely will not) exert coercive control over the world.

But process theologians argue that coercive power is actually a secondary or derivative form of power, while persuasion is the primary form. Even the act of self-motion (of an arm, for instance) is an instance of persuasive power. The arm may not perform in the way a person wishes it to—it may be broken, or asleep, or otherwise unable to perform the desired action. It is only after the persuasive act of self-motion is successful that an entity can even begin to exercise coercive control over other finite physical bodies. But no amount of coercive control can alter the free decisions of other entities; only persuasion can do so.

For example, a child is told by his parent that he must go to bed. The child, as a self-conscious, decision-making individual, can always make the decision to not go to bed. The parent may then respond by picking up the child bodily and carrying him to his room, but nothing can force the child to alter his decision to resist the parent's directive. It is only the body of the child that can be coercively controlled by the body of the physically stronger parent; the child's free will remains intact. While process theologians argue that God does not have coercive power, they also argue that God has supreme persuasive power, that God is always influencing/persuading us to choose the good.

One classic exchange over the issue of divine power is between philosophers Frederick Sontag and John K. Roth and process theologian David Ray Griffin. Sontag and Roth argued that the process God's inability to, for instance, stop the genocide at Auschwitz meant that God was not worthy of worship, since there is no point in worshipping a God that cannot save us from such atrocities. Griffin's response was as follows:

One of the stronger complaints from Sontag and Roth is that, given the enormity of evil in the world, a deity that is [merely] doing its best is not worthy of worship. The implication is that a deity that is not doing its best is worthy of worship. For example, in reference to Auschwitz, Roth mocks my God with the statement that “the best that God could possibly do was to permit 10,000 Jews a day to go up in smoke.” Roth prefers a God who had the power to prevent this Holocaust but did not do it! This illustrates how much people can differ in what they consider worthy of worship. For Roth, it is clearly brute power that evokes worship. The question is: is this what should evoke worship? To refer back to the point about revelation: is this kind of power worship consistent with the Christian claim that divinity is decisively revealed in Jesus? Roth finds my God too small to evoke worship; I find his too gross.

The process argument, then, is that those who cling to the idea of God's coercive omnipotence are defending power for power's sake, which would seem to be inconsistent with the life of Jesus, who Christians believe died for humanity's sins rather than overthrow the Roman empire. Griffin argues that it is actually the God whose omnipotence is defined in the "traditional" way that is not worshipful.

One other distinction process theologians make is between the idea of "unilateral" power versus "relational" power. Unilateral power is the power of a king (or more accurately, a tyrant) who wishes to exert control over his subjects without being affected by them. However, most people would agree that a ruler who is not changed or affected by the joys and sorrows of his subjects is actually a despicable ruler and a psychopath. Process theologians thus stress that God's power is relational; rather than being unaffected and unchanged by the world, God is the being most affected by every other being in the universe. As process theologian C. Robert Mesle puts it:

Relational power takes great strength. In stark contrast to unilateral power, the radical manifestations of relational power are found in people like Martin Luther King Jr., Mahatma Gandhi, and Jesus. It requires the willingness to endure tremendous suffering while refusing to hate. It demands that we keep our hearts open to those who wish to slam them shut. It means offering to open up a relationship with people who hate us, despise us, and wish to destroy us.

In summation, then, process theologians argue that their conception of God's power does not diminish God, but just the opposite. Rather than see God as one who unilaterally coerces other beings, judges and punishes them, and is completely unaffected by the joys and sorrows of others, process theologians see God as the one who persuades the universe to love and peace, is supremely affected by even the tiniest of joys and the smallest of sorrows, and is able to love all beings despite the most heinous acts they may commit. God is, as Whitehead says, "the fellow sufferer who understands".

== See also ==
- Christian existentialism
- Conceptions of God
- Earthseed
- Essence–energies distinction
- Fundamentalist–modernist controversy
- Liberal Christianity
- Liberal naturalism
- Neo-Hasidism
- Open theism
- Philosophical theism
- Philosophical theology
- Synergism
- Systematic theology
- Theopoetics
