= Point-free =

Point-free may refer to:

- Pointless topology, an approach to topology that avoids mentioning points
- Point-free style in programming, called also tacit programming
- Whitehead's point-free geometry, a geometry whose primitive ontological notion is region rather than point. Two axiomatic systems are set out below, one grounded in mereology, the other in mereotopology and known as connection theory. A point can mark a space or objects
