= Achille Varzi (philosopher) =

Italian-born philosopher (born 1958)

Achille C. Varzi
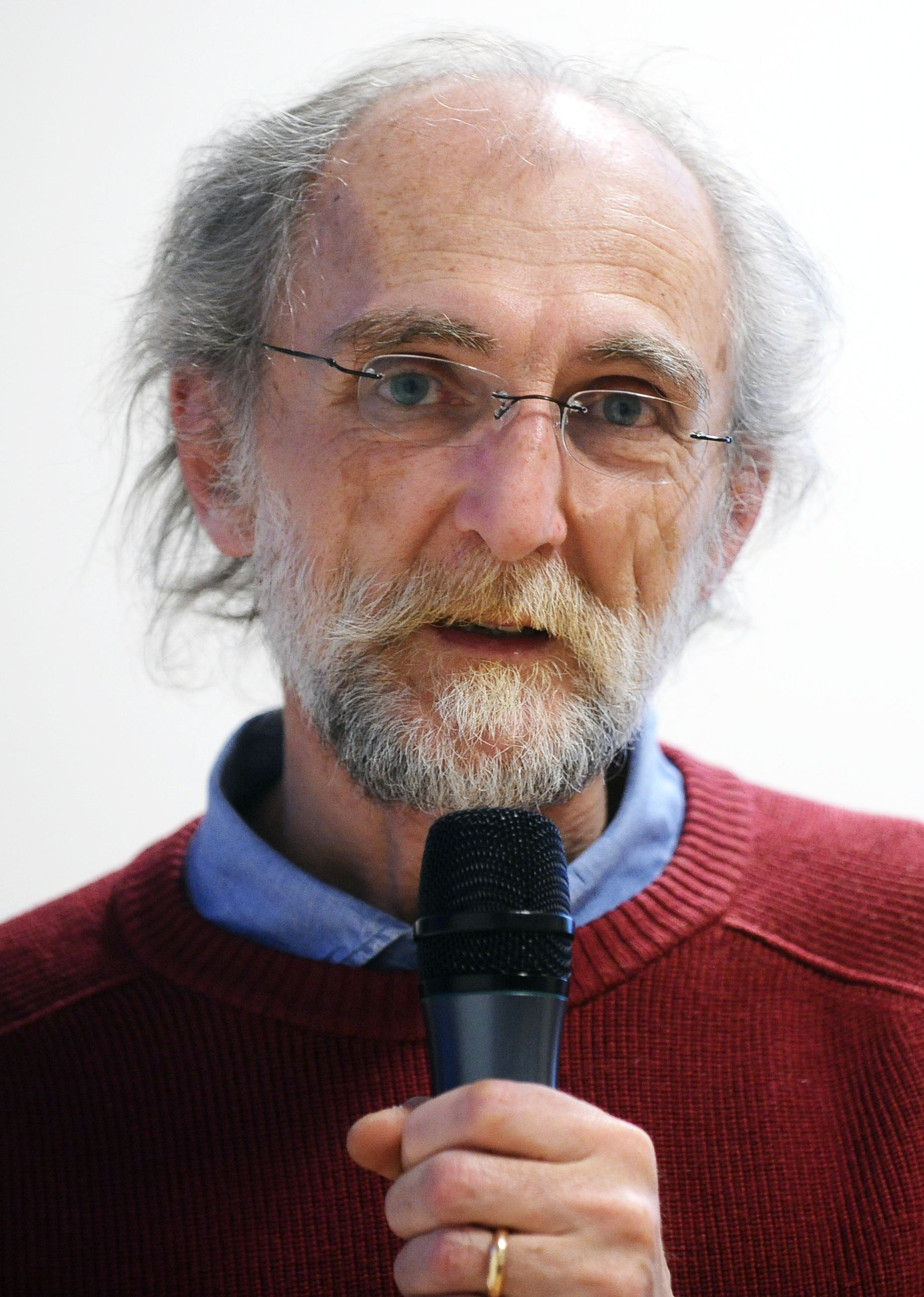
- Born: 8 May 1958 (age 68); Galliate

Education
- Education: University of Toronto; University of Trento
- Doctoral advisor: Hans G. Herzberger

Philosophical work
- Era: Contemporary philosophy
- Region: Western philosophy
- School: Analytic
- Institutions: Columbia University
- Main interests: Philosophical logic, metaphysics

Achille C. Varzi (born May 8, 1958) is an Italian-born philosopher who is John Dewey Professor of philosophy at Columbia University. He graduated from the University of Trento and received his PhD in philosophy from the University of Toronto. Varzi is also Bruno Kessler Honorary Professor at the University of Trento and, since 2017, visiting professor at the University of Italian Switzerland.

== Work ==
Varzi has made notable contributions to the fields of philosophical logic (mainly vagueness, supervaluationism, paraconsistency, formal semantics) and metaphysics (mainly mereology and mereotopology, causation, events, and issues relating to identity and persistence through time). His first book, Holes and Other Superficialities (1994, with Roberto Casati), was an exploration of the realist ontology of common sense and naive physics. His more recent work is inspired by a nominalist-conventionalist stance.

Varzi is currently an editor of The Journal of Philosophy and an advisory editor of the Stanford Encyclopedia of Philosophy. Varzi is also a prolific writer for the general public and contributes regularly to several Italian newspapers.

Achille C. Varzi is a nephew of the Italian racecar driver Achille Varzi.

== Books ==
- Mereology (with A. J. Cotnoir), Oxford: Oxford University Press, 2021.
- I colori del bene, Naples: Orthotes, 2015.
- Le tribolazioni del filosofare. Comedia Metaphysica ne la quale si tratta de li errori & de le pene de l’Infero (with Claudio Calosi), Rome: Laterza, 2014.
- Ontologie, Paris, Ithaque, 2010.
- Il mondo messo a fuoco, Rome: Laterza, 2010.
- Insurmountable Simplicities. Thirty-nine Philosophical Conundrums (with Roberto Casati), New York: Columbia University Press, 2006; also translated into French, Spanish, Portuguese, Italian, Polish, Greek, Chinese, Korean.
- Il pianeta dove scomparivano le cose. Esercizi di immaginazione filosofica (with Roberto Casati), Torini: Einaudi, 2006.
- Parole, oggetti, eventi e altri argomenti di metafisica, Rome: Carocci, 2001.
- An Essay in Universal Semantics, Dorrecht, Kluwer, 1999.
- Parts and Places. The Structures of Spatial Representation (with Roberto Casati), Boston (MA): MIT Press, 1999.
- Theory and Problems of Logic (with John Nolt and Dennis Rohatyn), New York: McGraw-Hill, 1998.
- Holes and Other Superficialities (with Roberto Casati), Boston (MA): MIT Press, 1994.

== See also ==
- American philosophy
- List of American philosophers
- Mereology
- Metaphysics
