= Point (geometry) =

Fundamental object of geometry

A finite set of points (in red) in the Euclidean plane.

In geometry, a point is an abstract idealization of an exact position, without size, in physical space, or its generalization to other kinds of mathematical spaces. As zero-dimensional objects, points are usually taken to be the fundamental indivisible elements comprising the space, of which one-dimensional curves, two-dimensional surfaces, and higher-dimensional objects consist.

In classical Euclidean geometry, a point is a primitive notion, defined as "that which has no part". Points and other primitive notions are not defined in terms of other concepts, but only by certain formal properties, called axioms, that they must satisfy; for example, "there is exactly one straight line that passes through two distinct points". As physical diagrams, geometric figures are made with tools such as a compass, scriber, or pen, whose pointed tip can mark a small dot or prick a small hole representing a point, or can be drawn across a surface to represent a curve.

A point can also be determined by the intersection of two curves or three surfaces, called a vertex or corner. Since the advent of analytic geometry, points are often defined or represented in terms of numerical coordinates. In modern mathematics, a space of points is typically treated as a set, a point set.

An isolated point is an element of some subset of points which has some neighborhood containing no other points of the subset.

== Points in Euclidean geometry ==
Points, considered within the framework of Euclidean geometry, are one of the most fundamental objects. Euclid originally defined the point as "that which has no part". In the two-dimensional Euclidean plane, a point is represented by an ordered pair (x, y) of numbers, where the first number conventionally represents the horizontal and is often denoted by x, and the second number conventionally represents the vertical and is often denoted by y. This idea is easily generalised to three-dimensional Euclidean space, where a point is represented by an ordered triplet (x, y, z) with the additional third number representing depth and often denoted by z. Further generalizations are represented by an ordered tuplet of n terms, (a_{1}, a_{2}, … , a_{n}) where n is the dimension of the space in which the point is located.

Many constructs within Euclidean geometry consist of an infinite collection of points that conform to certain axioms. This is usually represented by a set of points; As an example, a line is an infinite set of points of the form
$$L = \lbrace (a_1,a_2,...a_n) \mid a_1c_1 + a_2c_2 + ... a_nc_n = d \rbrace,$$
where c_{1} through c_{n} and d are constants and n is the dimension of the space. Similar constructions exist that define the plane, line segment, and other related concepts. A line segment consisting of only a single point is called a degenerate line segment.

In addition to defining points and constructs related to points, Euclid also postulated a key idea about points, that any two points can be connected by a straight line. This is easily confirmed under modern extensions of Euclidean geometry, and had lasting consequences at its introduction, allowing the construction of almost all the geometric concepts known at the time. However, Euclid's postulation of points was neither complete nor definitive, and he occasionally assumed facts about points that did not follow directly from his axioms, such as the ordering of points on the line or the existence of specific points. In spite of this, modern expansions of the system serve to remove these assumptions.

== Dimension of a point ==
There are several inequivalent definitions of dimension in mathematics. In all of the common definitions, a point is 0-dimensional.

=== Vector space dimension ===
The dimension of a vector space is the maximum size of a linearly independent subset. In a vector space consisting of a single point (which must be the zero vector 0), there is no linearly independent subset. The zero vector is not itself linearly independent, because there is a non-trivial linear combination making it zero: $1 \cdot \mathbf{0}=\mathbf{0}$.

=== Topological dimension ===
The topological dimension of a topological space $X$ is defined to be the minimum value of n, such that every finite open cover $\mathcal{A}$ of $X$ admits a finite open cover $\mathcal{B}$ of $X$ which refines $\mathcal{A}$ in which no point is included in more than n+1 elements. If no such minimal n exists, the space is said to be of infinite covering dimension.

A point is zero-dimensional with respect to the covering dimension because every open cover of the space has a refinement consisting of a single open set.

=== Hausdorff dimension ===
Let X be a metric space. If S ⊂ X and d ∈ [0, ∞), the d-dimensional Hausdorff content of S is the infimum of the set of numbers δ ≥ 0 such that there is some (indexed) collection of balls $\{B(x_i,r_i):i\in I\}$ covering S with r_{i} > 0 for each i ∈ I that satisfies
$$\sum_{i\in I} r_i^d<\delta.$$

The Hausdorff dimension of X is defined by
$$\operatorname{dim}_{\operatorname{H}}(X):=\inf\{d\ge 0: C_H^d(X)=0\}.$$

A point has Hausdorff dimension 0 because it can be covered by a single ball of arbitrarily small radius.

== Geometry without points ==
Although the notion of a point is generally considered fundamental in mainstream geometry and topology, there are some systems that forgot it, e.g. noncommutative geometry and pointless topology. A "pointless" or "pointfree" space is defined not as a set, but via some structure (algebraic or logical respectively) which looks like a well-known function space on the set: an algebra of continuous functions or an algebra of sets respectively. More precisely, such structures generalize well-known spaces of functions in a way that the operation "take a value at this point" may not be defined. A further tradition starts from some books of A. N. Whitehead in which the notion of region is assumed as a primitive together with the one of inclusion or connection.

== Point masses and the Dirac delta function ==
Often in physics and mathematics, it is useful to think of a point as having non-zero mass or charge (this is especially common in classical electromagnetism, where electrons are idealized as points with non-zero charge). The Dirac delta function, or δ function, is (informally) a generalized function on the real number line that is zero everywhere except at zero, with an integral of one over the entire real line. The delta function is sometimes thought of as an infinitely high, infinitely thin spike at the origin, with total area one under the spike, and physically represents an idealized point mass or point charge. It was introduced by theoretical physicist Paul Dirac. In the context of signal processing it is often referred to as the unit impulse symbol (or function). Its discrete analog is the Kronecker delta function which is usually defined on a finite domain and takes values 0 and 1.

== See also ==
- Accumulation point
- Affine space
- Boundary point
- Critical point
- Cusp
- Event (relativity)
- Foundations of geometry
- Locus (mathematics)
- Position (geometry)
- Point at infinity
- Point cloud
- Point process
- Point set registration
- Pointwise
- Singular point of a curve
- Whitehead point-free geometry
