= Prehension (philosophy) =

Philosophical concept

Prehension is a fundamental concept in Alfred North Whitehead's process philosophy. It establishes the basic experiential relation applying to all entities of reality by which the present is realised out of the past. Entities selectively incorporate aspects of what they perceive, or prehend, into themselves. It is central to Whitehead's metaphysics and it identifies a mechanism by which both perception and memory are essentially the products of a common metaphysical process.

== Definition ==
In his 1925 book Science and the Modern World, Whitehead defined the term prehension as "uncognitive apprehension".

In 1929, Whitehead's Process and Reality was published based on his 1927–28 Gifford Lectures in Edinburgh. As part of the 'Categories of Explanation' in the book, Whitehead establishes an anatomy of prehensions:

"(xi) That every prehension consists of three factors: (a) the 'subject' which is prehending, namely, the actual entity in which that prehension is a concrete element; (b) the 'datum' which is prehended; (c) the 'subjective form' which is how that subject prehends that datum.

Prehensions of actual entities – i.e., prehensions whose data involve actual entities – are termed 'physical prehensions'; and prehensions of eternal objects are termed 'conceptual prehensions.' Consciousness is not necessarily involved in the subjective forms of either type of prehension.

(xii) That there are two species of prehensions: (a) 'positive prehensions' which are termed 'feelings,' and (b) 'negative prehensions' which are said to 'eliminate from feeling.' Negative prehensions also have subjective forms. A negative prehension holds its datum as inoperative in the progressive concrescence of prehensions constituting the unity of the subject."

The philosopher Steven Shaviro describes prehension as, "any grasping or sensing of one entity by another, or response of one entity to another." Leemon McHenry states that prehension, "is the central function of a creative universe whereby the many past occasions become a novel one."

The process philosopher Matthew David Segall explains that, "prehension does not entail just an internal or subjective experience. It's a transformative process where objects become subjects, embodying a dynamic interaction or bridge between what are normally considered distinct realms."

Though memory and perception are both realised via prehension, present memory is formed out of past conditions that are a part of the same personal lineage, whereas present perception is formed from past conditions that are external to a personal lineage.

== Significance within metaphysics ==
In Charles Hartshorne's 1978 paper Whitehead's Revolutionary Concept of Prehension, he stated, "...prehension is the whole story of causality and freedom. I know of nothing like this extraordinary generalization in the entire history of philosophy previous to Whitehead."

McHenry described prehension as, "Whitehead's most original and distinctive contribution to metaphysics."

Segall states that, "The concept of prehension is novel precisely because it seems to overcome the traditional divide that modern philosophy often draws between the inner world of human experience and the outer world of causal interactions."

In 2009, Peter Kakol described the significance of prehension in its ability to singularly unify a myriad of phenomena in metaphysics:

"The profundity of Whitehead’s concept of prehension becomes obvious when we consider that it makes possible the unification of no less than nine different phenomena (1) memory, as intra-bodily prehension of the distant past; (2) perception, as extra-bodily prehension of the more recent past; (3) time, as the passage from prehension to prehension; (4) space, as a complication of time: the prehension of parallel or contemporary prehensions; (5) causality, as the influence (in the sense of necessary condition only) of the prehended upon the prehending; (6) substance, being and enduring individuality, as abstractions from spatial and/or temporal prehensions such that only common features are prehended; (7) mind-body relation, as the interaction between two types of the previous relation – namely, a temporal series of prehensions (the mind) and a spatio-temporal grouping/ series of prehension (the body); (8) subject-object relation as the prehension of past prehension(s); and (9) God-world relation as the interaction between the totality of non-divine prehensions and the divine series of prehensions."
