= Inert knowledge =

Information which one can express but not use

Inert knowledge is information which one can express but not use. The process of understanding by learners does not happen to that extent where the knowledge can be used for effective problem-solving in realistic situations.

The phenomenon of inert knowledge was first described in 1929 by Alfred North Whitehead:

"[T]heoretical ideas should always find important applications within the pupil’s curriculum. This is not an easy doctrine to apply, but a very hard one. It contains within itself the problem of keeping knowledge alive, of preventing it from becoming inert, which is the central problem of all education."

— Whitehead 1929

An example for inert knowledge is vocabulary of a foreign language which is available during an exam but not in a real situation of communication.

An explanation for the problem of inert knowledge is that people often encode knowledge to a specific situation, so that later remindings occur only for highly similar situations.

In contrast so called conditionalized knowledge is knowledge about something which includes also knowledge as to the contexts in which that certain knowledge will be useful.
