= Mereotopology =

Branch of metaphysics

In formal ontology, a branch of metaphysics, and in ontological computer science, mereotopology is a first-order theory, embodying mereological and topological concepts, of the relations among wholes, parts, parts of parts, and the boundaries between parts. This field is related to spatial-temporal reasoning, region-connection calculus, and mathematical morphology.

== History and motivation ==
Mereotopology begins in philosophy with theories articulated by A. N. Whitehead in several books and articles he published between 1916 and 1929, drawing in part on the mereogeometry of De Laguna (1922). The first to have proposed the idea of a point-free definition of the concept of topological space in mathematics was Karl Menger in his book Dimensionstheorie (1928) -- see also his (1940). The early historical background of mereotopology is documented in Bélanger and Marquis (2013) and Whitehead's early work is discussed in Kneebone (1963: ch. 13.5) and Simons (1987: 2.9.1). The theory of Whitehead's 1929 Process and Reality augmented the part-whole relation with topological notions such as contiguity and connection. Despite Whitehead's acumen as a mathematician, his theories were insufficiently formal, even flawed. By showing how Whitehead's theories could be fully formalized and repaired, Clarke (1981, 1985) founded contemporary mereotopology. The theories of Clarke and Whitehead are discussed in Simons (1987: 2.10.2), and Lucas (2000: ch. 10). The entry Whitehead's point-free geometry includes two contemporary treatments of Whitehead's theories, due to Giangiacomo Gerla, each different from the theory set out in the next section.

Although mereotopology is a mathematical theory, we owe its subsequent development to logicians and theoretical computer scientists. Lucas (2000: ch. 10) and Casati and Varzi (1999: ch. 4,5) are introductions to mereotopology that can be read by anyone having done a course in first-order logic. More advanced treatments of mereotopology include Cohn and Varzi (2003) and, for the mathematically sophisticated, Roeper (1997). For a mathematical treatment of point-free geometry, see Gerla (1995). Lattice-theoretic (algebraic) treatments of mereotopology as contact algebras have been applied to separate the topological from the mereological structure, see Stell (2000), Düntsch and Winter (2004).

== Applications ==
Barry Smith, Anthony Cohn, Achille Varzi and their co-authors have shown that mereotopology can be useful in formal ontology and computer science, by allowing the formalization of relations such as contact, connection, boundaries, interiors, holes, and so on. Mereotopology has been applied also as a tool for qualitative spatial-temporal reasoning, with constraint calculi such as the Region Connection Calculus (RCC). It provides the starting point for the theory of fiat boundaries developed by Smith and Varzi, which grew out of the attempt to distinguish formally between

- boundaries (in geography, geopolitics, and other domains) which reflect more or less arbitrary human demarcations and
- boundaries which reflect bona fide physical discontinuities (Smith 1995, 2001).

Mereotopology is being applied by Salustri in the domain of digital manufacturing (Salustri, 2002) and by Smith and Varzi to the formalization of basic notions of ecology and environmental biology (Smith and Varzi, 1999, 2002). It has been applied also to deal with vague boundaries in geography (Smith and Mark, 2003), and in the study of vagueness and granularity (Smith and Brogaard, 2002, Bittner and Smith, 2001, 2001a).

== Preferred approach of Casati & Varzi ==
Casati and Varzi (1999: ch.4) set out a variety of mereotopological theories in a consistent notation. This section sets out several nested theories that culminate in their preferred theory GEMTC, and follows their exposition closely. The mereological part of GEMTC is the conventional theory GEM. Casati and Varzi do not say if the models of GEMTC include any conventional topological spaces.

We begin with some domain of discourse, whose elements are called individuals (a synonym for mereology is "the calculus of individuals"). Casati and Varzi prefer limiting the ontology to physical objects, but others freely employ mereotopology to reason about geometric figures and events, and to solve problems posed by research in machine intelligence.

An upper case Latin letter denotes both a relation and the predicate letter referring to that relation in first-order logic. Lower case letters from the end of the alphabet denote variables ranging over the domain; letters from the start of the alphabet are names of arbitrary individuals. If a formula begins with an atomic formula followed by the biconditional, the subformula to the right of the biconditional is a definition of the atomic formula, whose variables are unbound. Otherwise, variables not explicitly quantified are tacitly universally quantified. The axiom Cn below corresponds to axiom C.n in Casati and Varzi (1999: ch. 4).

We begin with a topological primitive, a binary relation called connection; the atomic formula Cxy denotes that "x is connected to y." Connection is governed, at minimum, by the axioms:

C1. $\ Cxx.$ (reflexive)

C2. $Cxy \rightarrow Cyx.$ (symmetric)

Let E, the binary relation of enclosure, be defined as:

$Exy \leftrightarrow [Czx \rightarrow Czy].$

Exy is read as "y encloses x" and is also topological in nature. A consequence of C1-2 is that E is reflexive and transitive, and hence a preorder. If E is also assumed extensional, so that:

$(Exa \leftrightarrow Exb) \leftrightarrow (a=b),$

then E can be proved antisymmetric and thus becomes a partial order. Enclosure, notated xKy, is the single primitive relation of the theories in Whitehead (1919, 1920), the starting point of mereotopology.

Let parthood be the defining primitive binary relation of the underlying mereology, and let the atomic formula Pxy denote that "x is part of y". We assume that P is a partial order. Call the resulting minimalist mereological theory M.

If x is part of y, we postulate that y encloses x:

C3. $\ Pxy \rightarrow Exy.$

C3 nicely connects mereological parthood to topological enclosure.

Let O, the binary relation of mereological overlap, be defined as:

$Oxy \leftrightarrow \exist z[Pzx \land\ Pzy].$

Let Oxy denote that "x and y overlap." With O in hand, a consequence of C3 is:

$Oxy \rightarrow Cxy.$

Note that the converse does not necessarily hold. While things that overlap are necessarily connected, connected things do not necessarily overlap. If this were not the case, topology would merely be a model of mereology (in which "overlap" is always either primitive or defined).

Ground mereotopology (MT) is the theory consisting of primitive C and P, defined E and O, the axioms C1-3, and axioms assuring that P is a partial order. Replacing the M in MT with the standard extensional mereology GEM results in the theory GEMT.

Let IPxy denote that "x is an internal part of y." IP is defined as:

$IPxy \leftrightarrow (Pxy \land (Czx \rightarrow Ozy)).$

Let σx φ(x) denote the mereological sum (fusion) of all individuals in the domain satisfying φ(x). σ is a variable binding prefix operator. The axioms of GEM assure that this sum exists if φ(x) is a first-order formula. With σ and the relation IP in hand, we can define the interior of x, $\mathbf{i}x,$ as the mereological sum of all interior parts z of x, or:

$\mathbf{i}x =$_{df} $\sigma z[IPzx].$

Two easy consequences of this definition are:

$\mathbf{i}W = W,$

where W is the universal individual, and

C5. $\ P(\mathbf{i}x)x.$ (Inclusion)

The operator i has two more axiomatic properties:

C6. $\mathbf{i}(\mathbf{i}x) = \mathbf{i}x.$ (Idempotence)

C7. $\mathbf{i}(x \times y) = \mathbf{i}x \times \mathbf{i}y,$

where a×b is the mereological product of a and b, not defined when Oab is false. i distributes over product.

It can now be seen that i is isomorphic to the interior operator of topology. Hence the dual of i, the topological closure operator c, can be defined in terms of i, and Kuratowski's axioms for c are theorems. Likewise, given an axiomatization of c that is analogous to C5-7, i may be defined in terms of c, and C5-7 become theorems. Adding C5-7 to GEMT results in Casati and Varzi's preferred mereotopological theory, GEMTC.

x is self-connected if it satisfies the following predicate:

$SCx \leftrightarrow ((Owx \leftrightarrow (Owy \lor Owz)) \rightarrow Cyz).$

Note that the primitive and defined predicates of MT alone suffice for this definition. The predicate SC enables formalizing the necessary condition given in Whitehead's Process and Reality for the mereological sum of two individuals to exist: they must be connected. Formally:

C8. $Cxy \rightarrow \exist z[SCz \land Ozx \land (Pwz \rightarrow (Owx \lor Owy)).$

Given some mereotopology X, adding C8 to X results in what Casati and Varzi call the Whiteheadian extension of X, denoted WX. Hence the theory whose axioms are C1-8 is WGEMTC.

The converse of C8 is a GEMTC theorem. Hence given the axioms of GEMTC, C is a defined predicate if O and SC are taken as primitive predicates.

If the underlying mereology is atomless and weaker than GEM, the axiom that assures the absence of atoms (P9 in Casati and Varzi 1999) may be replaced by C9, which postulates that no individual has a topological boundary:

C9. $\forall x \exist y[Pyx \land (Czy \rightarrow Ozx) \land \lnot (Pxy \land (Czx \rightarrow Ozy))].$

When the domain consists of geometric figures, the boundaries can be points, curves, and surfaces. What boundaries could mean, given other ontologies, is not an easy matter and is discussed in Casati and Varzi (1999: ch. 5).

== See also ==
- Mereology
- Pointless topology
- Point-set topology
- Topology
- Topological space (with links to T0 through T6)
- Whitehead's point-free geometry
