= Thomas North Whitehead =

Human relations theorist and researcher

- Born: 31 December 1891; Cambridge, England
- Died: 22 November 1969 (aged 77); Cambridge, Massachusetts, U.S
- Father: Alfred North Whitehead

Academic background
- Education: Trinity College, Cambridge; University College London

Academic work
- Discipline: Human relations theory
- Institutions: Harvard University; Radcliffe College

Thomas North Whitehead (31 December 1891 – 22 November 1969) was an early human relations theorist and researcher, best known for The Industrial Worker, a two-volume statistical analysis of the Hawthorne experiments. He worked as a professor at Harvard University and Radcliffe College, and in the British Foreign Office during World War II.

== Early life and education ==
Whitehead was the son of the prominent English philosopher Alfred North Whitehead, and was known as "North" to his family. He read economics at Trinity College, Cambridge, earning a B.A. in 1913. He then did graduate studies in mechanical engineering at University College London.

== Government service ==
Whitehead served as an army officer in France and East Africa during World War I, taking a leave from his graduate studies to do so. On the completion of his studies in 1920 after the war, he began working for the Admiralty, and remained there until his 1931 move to Harvard.

During World War II, he again took a leave, this time from his professorship at Harvard, to work as an expert on American relations in the British Foreign Office. In 1940, before America entered the war, he advised Winston Churchill that American isolationism would not be a permanent obstacle, and after the Pearl Harbor attacks he communicated a message of solidarity to Franklin D. Roosevelt. It was also Whitehead's suggestion that Churchill compare America's proposed Lend-Lease policy to Magna Carta, and that one of the original copies of Magna Carta then on display in America be made into a more permanent gift to seal the deal. However, this proposal fell through because the British government did not own any of the four surviving copies of Magna Carta.

== Academia ==
Whitehead joined the Harvard Business School in 1931, following his father who had moved to Harvard in 1924. He stayed at Harvard for the rest of his career except for a leave of absence during World War II. After the war, Whitehead ran the Harvard-Radcliffe Program in Business Administration, a business program for women at Radcliffe College, keeping also his appointment at Harvard. He became a naturalized American citizen in 1952. When Harvard's business school began admitting women in 1955, he returned to a full-time position at Harvard. He remained at Harvard until his retirement.

== Contributions ==
Whitehead's work The design and use of instruments, published in 1934, was primarily written while he was still at the Admiralty. It prefigures the care in accurate measurement that Whitehead put into his work on the Hawthorne experiments. In this, Whitehead's "golden rule" was to "never measure more than is absolutely necessary".

The Hawthorne experiments studied worker productivity at a Western Electric factory. They were originally intended to study the effects of lighting on productivity, but instead determined that workers reacted positively to the changing conditions of the experiment, and that their productivity decreased again when the experiment ended. Whitehead, following the lead of Jean Piaget, took the approach of carefully documenting the behavior of a small sample of workers over a long period of time. His analysis of the Hawthorne experiments used rigorous statistics to argue "that personal and social relationships had been the dominant factors" in these effects. His work has been criticized as "complex and poorly presented", with unoriginal ideas "expressed in infuriatingly vague prose". Nevertheless, his work is important as the only original mathematical analysis of the experimental data and the only complete record of the entire run of the experiments.

Besides his work on the Hawthorne experiments, Whitehead is known for pioneering the development of the fields of human relations, organizational behavior, and human resource management, and for his 1936 book Leadership in a Free Society on the structure and organization of human activity.

== Selected publications ==
- The design and use of instruments and accurate measurement: Underlying principles. New York: Macmillan, 1934.
- The Industrial Worker. A statistical study of human relations in a group of manual workers. Volume I: Text. Volume II: Diagrams. Oxford University Press, 1938.
- Leadership in a Free Society. A study in human relations based on an analysis of present-day industrial civilization. Harvard University Press, 1947.
