= William T. Parry =

American philosopher (1908–1988)

William T. Parry (October 22, 1908 – August 13, 1988) was an American philosopher.

== Biography ==
Parry received a BA in psychology from Columbia College in 1928, a Master of Arts from Harvard University in 1930, and he completed his PhD in philosophy from Harvard University in 1932 with his dissertation on implication being supervised by Alfred North Whitehead. From 1932–1933, Parry was awarded the Sheldon Traveling Fellowship from Harvard University and spent a year studying at the University of Vienna and Cambridge University. From 1933 to 1937 he was an assistant professor at Harvard and later on a professor at University of Buffalo.

While a student, Parry had been a member of the Communist Party USA during the Red Scare. In May 1953 he was brought before the House Un-American Activities Committee where he was interrogated by Frank S. Tavenner Jr. and US Congressman Harold H. Velde. Parry had been named as a member of the Communist Party active in Boston in the 1930s by professor Robert Gorham Davis. Though he was willing to discuss his own history with the Communist Party, Parry was unwilling to give them names of other Party members. In advance of his hearing, Parry had sent correspondence to the Committee stating "I will not play the odious role of informer. I will not get innocent people into trouble." During the combative hearing, Parry pled the Fifth Amendment. Following this his tenure at Buffalo was revoked.

Parry was the first managing editor of the Marxist journal Science & Society.

Parry popularised the notion of 'analytic implication' which is material implication where the consequent contains only things which are in the antecedent.
