= Pointless topology =

Mathematical approach

In mathematics, pointless topology, also called point-free topology (or pointfree topology) or topology without points and locale theory, is an approach to topology where lattices of open sets are the primitive notion, and are not required to consist of subsets of points. In this approach it becomes possible to construct topologically interesting spaces from purely algebraic data. Points are then a derived notion rather than primitive, and there are non-trivial spaces that have no points.

== History ==
The first approaches to topology were geometrical, where one started from Euclidean space and patched things together. But Marshall Stone's work on Stone duality in the 1930s showed that topology can be viewed from an algebraic point of view (lattice-theoretic). Karl Menger was an early pioneer in the field, and his work on topology without points was inspired by Whitehead's point-free geometry and used shrinking regions of the plane to simulate points.

Apart from Stone, Henry Wallman also exploited this idea. Others continued this path till Charles Ehresmann and his student Jean Bénabou (and simultaneously others), took a major step in the late fifties. Their insights arose from the study of "topological" and "differentiable" categories.

Ehresmann's approach involved using a category whose objects were complete lattices that satisfied a distributive law and whose morphisms were maps that preserved finite meets and arbitrary joins. He called such lattices "local lattices"; today they are called "frames" to avoid ambiguity with other notions in lattice theory.

The theory of frames and locales in the contemporary sense was developed through the following decades (John Isbell, Peter Johnstone, Harold Simmons, Bernhard Banaschewski, Aleš Pultr, Till Plewe, Japie Vermeulen, Steve Vickers) into a lively branch of topology, with application in various fields, in particular also in theoretical computer science. For more on the history of locale theory see Johnstone's overview.

== Intuition ==
Traditionally, a topological space consists of a set of points together with a topology, a system of subsets called open sets that with the operations of union (as join) and intersection (as meet) forms a lattice with certain properties. Specifically, the union of any family of open sets is again an open set, and the intersection of finitely many open sets is again open. In pointless topology we take these properties of the lattice as fundamental, without requiring that the lattice elements be sets of points of some underlying space and that the lattice operation be intersection and union. Rather, point-free topology is based on the concept of a "realistic spot" instead of a point without extent. These "spots" can be joined (symbol $\vee$), akin to a union, and we also have a meet operation for spots (symbol $\and$), akin to an intersection. Using these two operations, the spots form a complete lattice. If a spot meets a join of others it has to meet some of the constituents, which, roughly speaking, leads to the distributive law

$$b \wedge \left( \bigvee_{i\in I} a_i\right) = \bigvee_{i\in I} \left(b\wedge a_i\right)$$

where the $a_i$ and $b$ are spots and the index family $I$ can be arbitrarily large. This distributive law is also satisfied by the lattice of open sets of a topological space.

If $X$ and $Y$ are topological spaces with lattices of open sets denoted by $\Omega(X)$ and $\Omega(Y)$, respectively, and $f\colon X\to Y$ is a continuous map, then, since the pre-image of an open set under a continuous map is open, we obtain a map of lattices in the opposite direction: $f^*\colon \Omega(Y)\to \Omega(X)$. Such "opposite-direction" lattice maps thus serve as the proper generalization of continuous maps in the point-free setting.

== Formal definitions ==
The basic concept is that of a frame, a complete lattice satisfying the general distributive law:

$b \wedge \left( \bigvee_{i\in I} a_i\right) = \bigvee_{i\in I} \left(b\wedge a_i\right)$

Frame homomorphisms are maps between frames that respect all joins (in particular, the least element of the lattice) and finite meets (in particular, the greatest element of the lattice). Frames, together with frame homomorphisms, form a category.

The opposite category of the category of frames is known as the category of locales. A locale $X$ is thus nothing but a frame; if we consider it as a frame, we will write it as $O(X)$. A locale morphism $X\to Y$ from the locale $X$ to the locale $Y$ is given by a frame homomorphism $O(Y)\to O(X)$.

Every topological space $T$ gives rise to a frame $\Omega(T)$ of open sets and thus to a locale. A locale is called spatial if it isomorphic (in the category of locales) to a locale arising from a topological space in this manner.

== Examples of locales ==
- As mentioned above, every topological space $T$ gives rise to a frame $\Omega(T)$ of open sets and thus to a locale, by definition a spatial one.
- Given a topological space $T$, we can also consider the collection of its regular open sets. This is a frame using as join the interior of the closure of the union, and as meet the intersection. We thus obtain another locale associated to $T$. This locale will usually not be spatial.
- For each $n\in\N$ and each $a\in\R$, use a symbol $U_{n,a}$ and construct the free frame on these symbols, modulo the relations

$$\bigvee_{a\in\R} U_{n,a}=\top   \ \text{  for every }n\in\N$$

$$U_{n,a}\and U_{n,b}=\bot   \ \text{  for every }n\in\N\text{ and all }a,b\in\R\text{ with } a\ne b$$

$$\bigvee_{n\in\N} U_{n,a}=\top   \ \text{  for every }a\in\R$$

(where $\top$ denotes the greatest element and $\bot$ the smallest element of the frame.) The resulting locale is known as the "locale of surjective functions $\N\to\R$". The relations are designed to suggest the interpretation of $U_{n,a}$ as the set of all those surjective functions $f:\N\to\R$ with $f(n)=a$. Of course, there are no such surjective functions $\N\to\R$, and this is not a spatial locale.

== The theory of locales ==
We have seen that we have a functor $\Omega$ from the category of topological spaces and continuous maps to the category of locales. If we restrict this functor to the full subcategory of sober spaces, we obtain a full embedding of the category of sober spaces and continuous maps into the category of locales. In this sense, locales are generalizations of sober spaces.

It is possible to translate most concepts of point-set topology into the context of locales, and prove analogous theorems. Some important facts of classical topology depending on choice principles become choice-free (that is, constructive, which is, in particular, appealing for computer science). Thus for instance, arbitrary products of compact locales are compact constructively (this is Tychonoff's theorem in point-set topology), or completions of uniform locales are constructive. This can be useful if one works in a topos that does not have the axiom of choice. Other advantages include the much better behaviour of paracompactness, with arbitrary products of paracompact locales being paracompact, which is not true for paracompact spaces, or the fact that subgroups of localic groups are always closed.

Another point where topology and locale theory diverge strongly is the concepts of subspaces versus sublocales, and density: given any collection of dense sublocales of a locale $X$, their intersection is also dense in $X$. This leads to Isbell's density theorem: every locale has a smallest dense sublocale. These results have no equivalent in the realm of topological spaces.

== See also ==
- Heyting algebra. Frames turn out to be the same as complete Heyting algebras (even though frame homomorphisms need not be Heyting algebra homomorphisms.)
- Complete Boolean algebra. Any complete Boolean algebra is a frame (it is a spatial frame if and only if it is atomic).
- Details on the relationship between the category of topological spaces and the category of locales, including the explicit construction of the equivalence between sober spaces and spatial locales, can be found in the article on Stone duality.
- Whitehead's point-free geometry.
- Mereotopology.
