= Claudio Calosi =

Italian professor of philosophy

Academic background
- Education: University of Florence (PhD)
- Thesis: Time and Objects in Minkowski Spacetime: An Exercise in Descriptive Metaphysics (2010)
- Doctoral advisor: Paolo Parrini

Academic work
- Era: Contemporary philosophy
- Region: Western philosophy
- Institutions: Ca' Foscari University of Venice; Università della Svizzera italiana

Claudio Calosi is an associate professor of philosophy at the Ca' Foscari University of Venice and a visiting professor at Università della Svizzera italiana.

== Life ==
He previously held an assistant professorship at the University of Geneva and has been a visiting faculty member at several institutions, including University of Oxford, University of Leeds, University of Lisbon, and UNAM in Mexico City. He holds a Ph.D. in philosophy from the University of Florence, where his thesis addressed "Time and Objects in Minkowski Spacetime".

== Publications ==
=== Edited volumes ===
- Calosi, Claudio; Graziani, Pierluigi; Pietrini, Davide; Tarozzi, G. (2021). Experience, Abstraction and the Scientific Image of the World: Festschrift for Vincenzo Fano. FrancoAngeli. ISBN 978-88-351-2139-8.
- Calosi, Claudio; Graziani, Pierluigi, eds. (2014). "Mereology and the Sciences". Synthese Library. doi:10.1007/978-3-319-05356-1. hdl:10871/19396. ISSN 0166-6991.

=== Articles ===
- Calosi, Claudio; Wilson, Jessica (2019). "Quantum metaphysical indeterminacy". Philosophical Studies. 176 (10): 2599–2627. doi:10.1007/s11098-018-1143-2. hdl:10278/5070382.
