= Process and Reality =

1929 book by Alfred North Whitehead

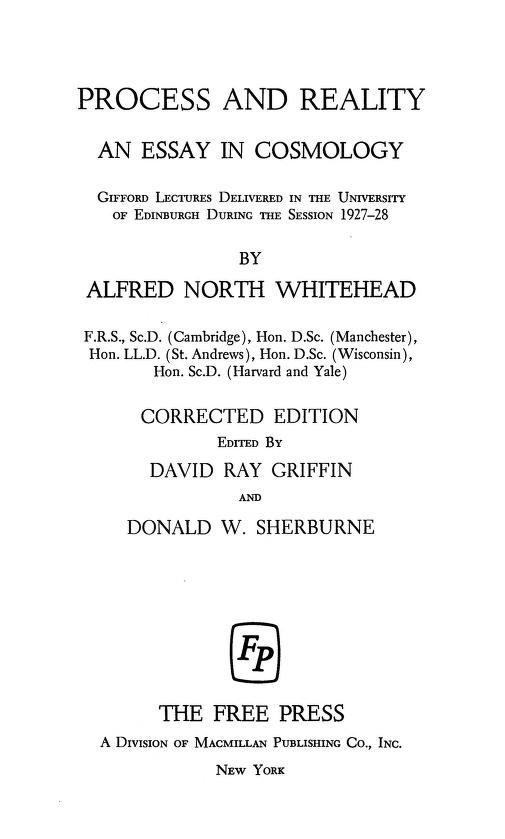
- Author: Alfred North Whitehead
- Language: English
- Publisher: The Free Press
- Publication date: 1929

Process and Reality is a book by Alfred North Whitehead, in which the author propounds a philosophy of organism, also called process philosophy. The book, published in 1929, is a revision of the Gifford Lectures he gave in 1927–28.

We diverge from Descartes by holding that what he has described as primary attributes of physical bodies, are really the forms of internal relationships between actual occasions. Such a change of thought is the shift from materialism to Organic Realism, as a basic idea of physical science.

— Process and Reality, 1929, p. 471.

== Whitehead's Process and Reality ==
Whitehead published A Treatise on Universal Algebra in 1898 which profiled various algebraic structures for comparison. He joined Bertrand Russell, author of Principles of Mathematics (1903), to compose Principia Mathematica, a monument of symbolic logic, from 1911 to 1914. The static nature of these structures contrasted with his perception of the inevitability of change. So, he took the temporal factor of structures into account for Process and Reality, first presented as the Gifford Lectures at Edinburgh, between 1927-28.

The following is an attempt to provide an accessible outline of some of the main ideas in Whitehead's Process and Reality, based on the book itself, but guided by a general reading of secondary sources, especially I. Leclerc's Whitehead's Metaphysics. An Introductory Exposition. Whitehead often speaks of the metaphysics of Process and Reality as 'the philosophy of organism'.

The cosmology elaborated in Process and Reality posits an ontology based on the two kinds of existence of entity, that of actual entity and that of abstract entity or abstraction.

The ultimate abstract principle of actual existence for Whitehead is creativity. Actual existence is a process of becoming, and “'becoming' is a creative advance into novelty". It is manifest in what can be called 'singular causality'. This term may be contrasted with 'nomic causality'. An example of singular causation is that I woke this morning because my alarm clock rang. An example of nomic causation is that alarm clocks generally wake people in the morning. Aristotle recognises singular causality as efficient causality. For Whitehead, there are many contributory singular causes for an event. A further contributory singular cause of my being awoken by my alarm clock this morning was that I was lying asleep near it until it rang.

An actual entity is a general philosophical term for an utterly determinate and completely concrete individual particular of the actually existing world or universe of changeable entities considered in terms of singular causality, about which categorical statements can be made. Whitehead's most far-reaching and profound and radical contribution to metaphysics is his invention of a better way of choosing the actual entities. Whitehead chooses a way of defining the actual entities that makes them all alike, qua actual entities, with a single exception, God.

For example, for Aristotle, the actual entities were the substances, such as Socrates (a particular citizen of Athens) and Bucephalus (a particular horse belonging to Alexander the Great). Besides Aristotle's ontology of substances, another example of an ontology that posits actual entities is in Leibniz' monads, said to be 'windowless'.

=== Whitehead's actual entities ===
For Whitehead, the actual entities exist as the only foundational elements of reality, the ultimately existing facts of the world. Nothing "either in fact or in efficacy" underlies or lies beyond the actual entities; rather they underlie all reality.

The actual entities are of two kinds, temporal and atemporal.

With one exception, all actual entities for Whitehead are temporal and are occasions of experience (which are not to be confused with consciousness, or with mere subjectivity). This 'actual entity' idea is most distinctly characteristic of the metaphysics of Process and Reality, and requires of the newly approaching reader a philosophically unprejudiced approach. An entity that people commonly think of as a simple concrete object, or that Aristotle would think of as a substance – a human being included – is in this ontology considered to be a composite of indefinitely many occasions of experience.

The one exceptional actual entity is at once temporal and atemporal: God. He is objectively immortal, as well as being immanent in the world. He is objectified in each temporal actual entity; but He is not an eternal object. Whitehead uses the term 'actual occasion' to refer only to purely temporal actual entities, those other than God.

The occasions of experience are of four grades. The first comprises processes in a physical vacuum such as the propagation of an electromagnetic wave or gravitational influence across empty space. The occasions of experience of the second grade involve just inanimate matter. The occasions of experience of the third grade involve living organisms. Occasions of experience of the fourth grade involve experience in the mode of presentational immediacy, which means more or less what are often called the qualia of subjective experience. So far as we know, experience in the mode of presentational immediacy occurs in only more evolved animals. That some occasions of experience involve experience in the mode of presentational immediacy is the one and only reason why Whitehead makes the occasions of experience his actual entities; for the actual entities must be of the ultimately general kind. Consequently, it is inessential that an occasion of experience have an aspect in the mode of presentational immediacy; occasions in the grades one, two, and three lack that aspect. The highest grade of experience "is to be identified with the canalized importance of free conceptual functionings".

There is no mind-matter duality in this ontology, because "mind" is simply seen as an abstraction from an occasion of experience which has also a material aspect, which is of course simply another abstraction from it; thus the mental and the material aspects are abstractions from one and the same concrete occasion of experience. The brain is part of the body, both being abstractions of a kind known as persistent physical objects, neither being actual entities. Though not recognised by Aristotle, there is biological evidence, written about by Galen, that the human brain is an essential seat of human experience in the mode of presentational immediacy. We may say that the brain has a material and a mental aspect, all three being abstractions from their indefinitely many constitutive occasions of experience, which are actual entities.

Inherent in each actual entity is its respective dimension of time. Potentially, each occasion of experience is causally consequential on every other occasion of experience that precedes it in time, and has as its causal consequences every other occasion of experience that follows; thus it has been said that Whitehead's occasions of experience are 'all window', in contrast to Leibniz's 'windowless' monads. In time defined relative to it, each occasion of experience is causally influenced by prior occasions of experiences, and causally influences future occasions of experience. An occasion of experience consists of a process of prehending other occasions of experience, reacting to them.

Whitehead presented his understanding of Minkowski space in An Enquiry concerning the Principles of Natural Knowledge (1919). One principle is that velocity determines an inertial frame of reference with respect to a resting frame. Another is that two events of Minkowski space have spacetime interval which is zero when there is a light connection, otherwise is either temporal or spatial. Two events can be causally related only if their separation is temporal.

The actual entity, the occasion of experience, is logically atomic in the sense that it cannot be cut and separated into two other occasions of experience. This kind of logical atomicity is perfectly compatible with indefinitely many spatiotemporal overlaps of occasions of experience. One can explain this atomicity by saying that an occasion of experience has an internal causal structure that could not be reproduced in each of the two complementary sections into which it might be cut. Nevertheless, an actual entity can completely contain indefinitely many other actual entities.

Whitehead's theory of extension concerns the spatio-temporal features of his occasions of experience. Fundamental to both Newtonian and to quantum theoretical mechanics is the concept of velocity. The measurement of a velocity requires a finite spatiotemporal extent. Because it has no finite spatiotemporal extent, a single event of Minkowski space cannot be an occasion of experience, but is an abstraction from an infinite set of overlapping or contained occasions of experience, as explained in Process and Reality. Though the occasions of experience are atomic, they are not necessarily separate in extension, spatiotemporally, from one another. Indefinitely many occasions of experience can overlap in Minkowski space.

An example of a nexus of temporally overlapping occasions of experience is what Whitehead calls an enduring physical object, which corresponds closely with an Aristotelian substance. An enduring physical object temporally has an earliest and a last member. Every member (apart from the earliest) is a causal consequence of the earliest member of the nexus, and every member (apart from the last) of such a nexus is a causal antecedent of the last. There are indefinitely many other causal antecedents and consequences of the enduring physical object, which overlap, but are not members, of the nexus. No member of the nexus is spatially separate from any other member. Within the nexus are indefinitely many continuous streams of overlapping nexūs, each stream including the earliest and the last member of the enduring physical object. Thus an enduring physical object, like an Aristotelian substance, undergoes changes and adventures during the course of its existence.

Another aspect of the atomicity of occasions of experience is that they do not change. An actual entity is what it is. An occasion of experience can be described as a process of change, but is itself unchangeable.

=== Whitehead's abstractions ===
Whitehead's abstractions are conceptual entities that are abstracted from or derived from and founded upon his actual entities. Abstractions are themselves not actual entities, but are the only entities that can be real.

An abstraction is a conceptual entity that involves more than one single actual entity. Whitehead's ontology refers to importantly structured collections of actual entities as nexuses of actual entities. Collection of actual entities into a nexus emphasises some aspect of those entities, and that emphasis is an abstraction, because it means that some aspects of the actual entities are emphasised or dragged away from their actuality, while other aspects are de-emphasised.

Whitehead admitted indefinitely many eternal objects. An example of an eternal object is a number, such as the number 'two'. Whitehead held that eternal objects are abstractions of a very high degree. Many abstractions, including eternal objects, are potential ingredients of processes.

=== Relation between actual entities and abstractions stated in the ontological principle ===
For Whitehead, besides its temporal generation by the actual entities which are its contributory causes, a process may be considered as a concrescence of abstract ingredient eternal objects. God enters into every temporal actual entity.

Whitehead's ontological principle is that whatever reality pertains to an abstraction is derived from the actual entities upon which it is founded or of which it is comprised.

== A source of an aphorism ==
The book is also the source of the frequently heard aphoristic reference to Western philosophy all being "footnotes to Plato":

The safest general characterization of the European philosophical tradition is that it consists of a series of footnotes to Plato.

— Process and Reality, Free Press, 1978, p. 39.

== Publication data ==
The several originally published editions of Process and Reality were from New York and from Cambridge UK. There were many textual errors, partly due to Whitehead's imperfect handwriting and lack of interest in proof-reading. A largely corrected scholarly redaction was eventually prepared and published as Process and Reality: An Essay in Cosmology (1929). 1979 corrected edition, edited by David Ray Griffin and Donald W. Sherburne, Free Press, ISBN 0-02-934570-7.

== See also ==
- Mereotopology
- Michel Weber
- Whitehead's point-free geometry

== Secondary literature ==
- Biacino L., and Gerla G., 1991, "Connection structures," Notre Dame Journal of Formal Logic 32: 242–247.
- Clarke, Bowman, 1981, "A calculus of individuals based on 'connection'," Notre Dame Journal of Formal Logic 22: 204–18.
- ——, 1985, "Individuals and Points," Notre Dame Journal of Formal Logic 26: 61–75.
- Cobb, John Boswell Jr., 2008,Whitehead Word Book, Claremont, P&F Press.
- Leclerc, Ivor, 1958, Whitehead's Metaphysics, George Allen and Unwin Ltd.
- Lowe, Victor, 1962. Understanding Whitehead. Johns Hopkins Univ. Press.
- Mesle, C. Robert, 2008. Process-Relational Philosophy: An Introduction to Alfred North Whitehead, Templeton Press, 1st edition.
- Nicholas Rescher, 2000. Process Philosophy: A Survey of Basic issues. Univ. of Pittsburgh Press.
- Sherburne, Donald W., 1966. A Key to Whitehead's Process and Reality. Macmillan.
- Simons, Peter, 1987. Parts. Oxford Univ. Press.
- Stengers, Isabelle, 2011. Thinking with Whitehead: A Free and Wild Creation of Concepts, Michael Chase (tr.), Harvard University Press
- Weber, Michel, 2006, Whitehead’s Pancreativism. The Basics. Foreword by Nicholas Rescher, Frankfurt / Paris, ontos verlag.
- Weber, Michel, 2011, Whitehead’s Pancreativism. Jamesian Applications, Frankfurt / Paris, ontos verlag.
- Weber, Michel and Will Desmond (eds.), 2008,Handbook of Whiteheadian Process Thought, Frankfurt / Lancaster, ontos verlag.
- Van Wyk, Alan and Weber, Michel (eds.), 2009, Creativity and Its Discontents. The Response to Whitehead's Process and Reality, Frankfurt / Lancaster, ontos verlag.
