= Alfred North Whitehead =

English mathematician and philosopher (1861–1947)

Alfred North Whitehead OM FRS FBA
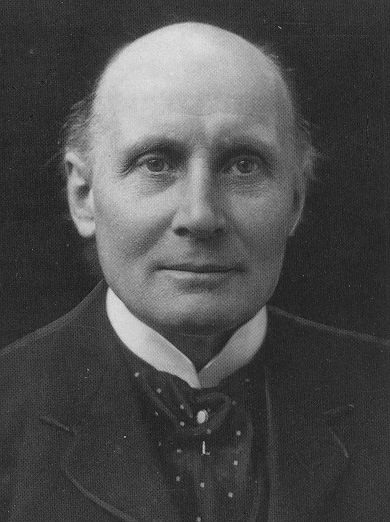
- Whitehead, c. 1924
- Born: 15 February 1861; Ramsgate, Kent, England
- Died: 30 December 1947 (aged 86); Cambridge, Massachusetts, US
- Spouse: Evelyn Ada Maud Rice Wade
- Children: 3, including Thomas
- Relatives: Henry Whitehead (brother); J. H. C. Whitehead (nephew)

Education
- Education: Trinity College, Cambridge (B.A., 1884)
- Academic advisor: Edward Routh

Philosophical work
- Era: 20th-century philosophy
- Region: Western philosophy
- School: Analytic philosophy (early); Logicism (early); Process philosophy; Process theology
- Institutions: Trinity College, Cambridge; University College London; Imperial College London; Harvard University
- Doctoral students: Dorothy Emmet; Susanne Langer; F. S. C. Northrop; William T. Parry; W. V. O. Quine; Gregory Vlastos; Paul Weiss
- Notable students: Donald Davidson; Raphael Demos; Marjorie Grene; Charles Hartshorne; Bertrand Russell
- Main interests: Metaphysics; Mathematics
- Notable ideas: Inert knowledge; Gunk; Mereotopology; Process philosophy; Process theology; Prehension; Whitehead's point-free geometry; Whitehead's theory of gravitation

Alfred North Whitehead (15 February 1861 – 30 December 1947) was an English mathematician and philosopher. He created the philosophical school known as process philosophy, which has been applied in a wide variety of disciplines, including ecology, theology, education, physics, biology, economics and psychology.

In his early career Whitehead wrote primarily on mathematics, logic and physics. He wrote the three-volume Principia Mathematica (1910–1913), with his former student Bertrand Russell. Principia Mathematica is considered one of the twentieth century's most important works in mathematical logic, and placed 23rd in a list of the top 100 English-language nonfiction books of the twentieth century by Modern Library.

Beginning in the late 1910s and early 1920s, Whitehead gradually turned his attention from mathematics to philosophy of science, and finally to metaphysics. He developed a comprehensive metaphysical system which radically departed from most of Western philosophy. Whitehead argued that reality consists of processes rather than material objects, and that processes are best defined by their relations with other processes, thus rejecting the theory that reality is fundamentally constructed by bits of matter that exist independently of one another. Whitehead's philosophical works – particularly Process and Reality – are regarded as the foundational texts of process philosophy.

Whitehead's process philosophy argues that "there is urgency in coming to see the world as a web of interrelated processes of which we are integral parts, so that all of our choices and actions have consequences for the world around us." For this reason, one of the most promising applications of Whitehead's thought in the 21st century has been in the area of ecological civilisation and environmental ethics pioneered by John B. Cobb.

== Biography ==
=== Early and education ===
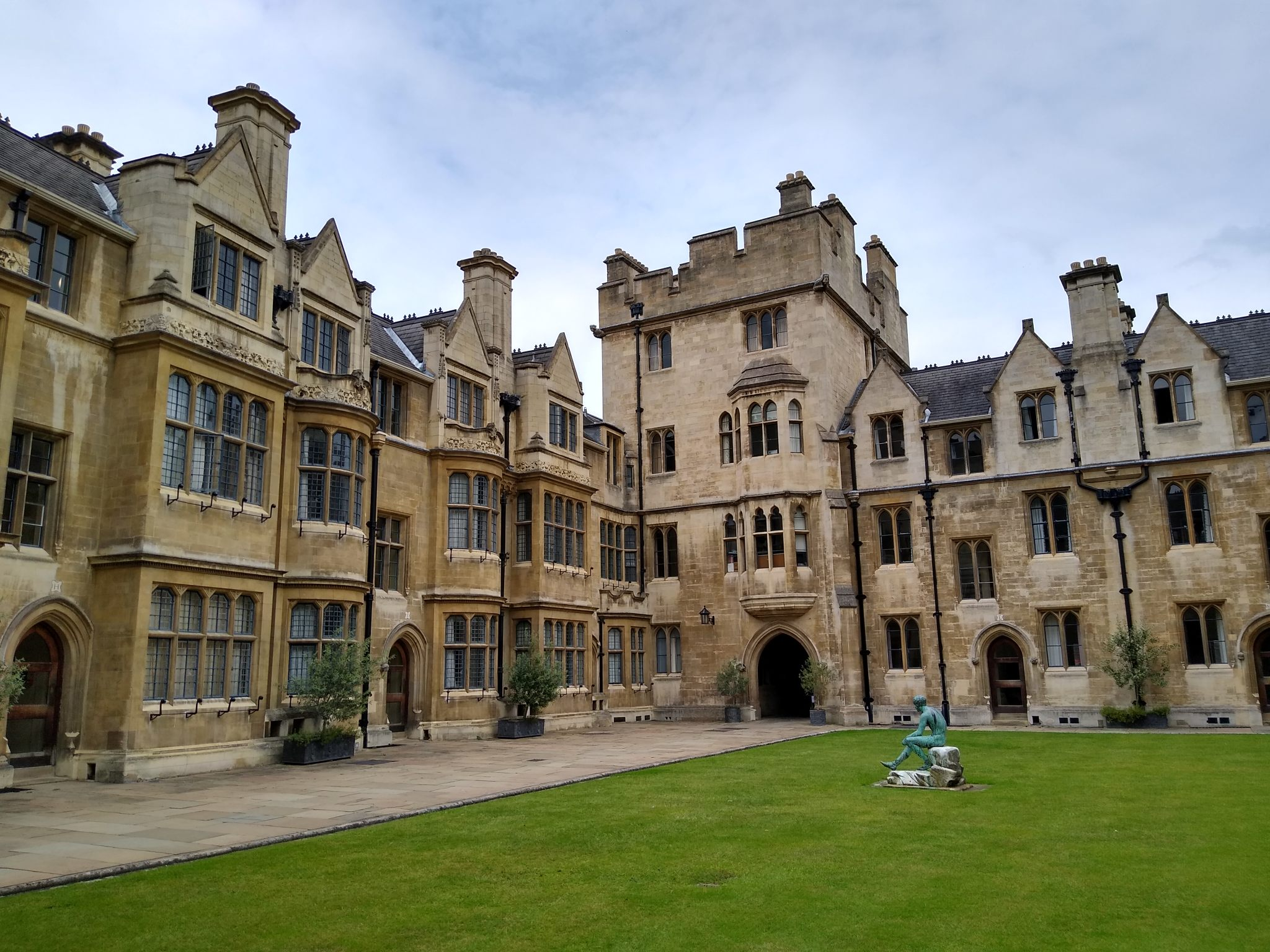
Whewell's Court north range at Trinity College, Cambridge. Whitehead spent thirty years at Trinity, five as a student and twenty-five as a senior lecturer.

Alfred North Whitehead was born in Ramsgate, Kent, England, in 1861. His father, Alfred Whitehead, became an Anglican minister after being headmaster of Chatham House Academy, a school for boys previously headed by Alfred's father, Thomas Whitehead. Whitehead himself recalled both of them as being very successful schoolmasters, with his grandfather being the more "remarkable" man.

Whitehead's mother was Maria Sarah Buckmaster. Her maternal great-grandmother was Jane North (1776–1847), whose maiden surname was given to Whitehead, and several other members of his family over time. His mother, Maria Buckmaster had eleven siblings. The son of her brother Thomas, Walter Selby Buckmaster, was twice an Olympics silver medal winner for Polo (1900, 1908) for Britain, and is said to be "one of the finest polo players England has ever produced". Whitehead does not appear to have been close to his mother, although he and Evelyn (full name: Evelyn Ada Maud Rice Willoughby Wade), whom he married in 1890, are recorded in the English Census of 1891 as living with Alfred's mother and father. Lowe notes that there appears to have been mutual dislike between Whitehead's wife, Evelyn, and his mother, Maria.

Griffin relates how Bertrand Russell, a colleague and collaborator of Whitehead, was a very close friend of Whitehead and of his wife, Evelyn. Griffin retells Russell's story of how, one evening in 1901, "they found Evelyn Whitehead in the middle of what appeared to be a dangerous and acutely painful angina attack. ... [but] It seems that she suffered from a psychosomatic disorder ... [and] the danger was illusory." Griffin posits that Russell exaggerated the drama of her illness, and that both Evelyn and Russell were habitually given to melodrama. Intensity of emotion was encouraged by their avant-garde associates in the turbulent Bloomsbury Group which "discussed aesthetic and philosophical questions in a spirit of agnosticism and were strongly influenced by G.E. Moore's Principia Ethica (1903) and by A. N. Whitehead's and Bertrand Russell's Principia Mathematica (1910–13), in the light of which they searched for definitions of the good, the true, and the beautiful".

Alfred's brother Henry became Bishop of Madras and wrote the closely observed ethnographic account Village Gods of South-India (Calcutta: Association Press, 1921).

Whitehead was educated at Sherborne, a prominent English public school, where he excelled in sports and mathematics and was head prefect of his class.

In 1880, he began attending Trinity College, Cambridge, and studied mathematics. His academic advisor was Edward Routh. He earned his B.A. from Trinity in 1884, writing his dissertation on James Clerk Maxwell's A Treatise on Electricity and Magnetism, and graduated as fourth wrangler.

=== Academic career ===
Elected a fellow of Trinity in 1884, Whitehead would teach and write on mathematics and physics at the college until 1910, spending the 1890s writing his Treatise on Universal Algebra (1898), and the 1900s collaborating with his former pupil, Bertrand Russell, on the first edition of Principia Mathematica. He was a Cambridge Apostle.

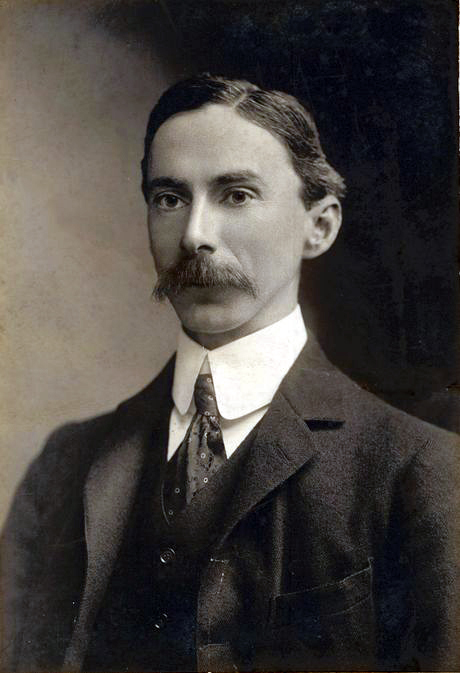
Bertrand Russell in 1907. Russell was a student of Whitehead's at Trinity College, and a longtime collaborator and friend.

In 1910, Whitehead resigned his senior lectureship in mathematics at Trinity and moved to London without first obtaining another job. After being unemployed for a year, he accepted a position as lecturer in applied mathematics and mechanics at University College London but was passed over a year later for the Goldsmid Chair of Applied Mathematics and Mechanics, a position for which he had hoped to be seriously considered.

In 1914, Whitehead accepted a position as professor of applied mathematics at the newly chartered Imperial College London, where his old friend Andrew Forsyth had recently been appointed chief professor of mathematics.

In 1918, Whitehead's academic responsibilities began to seriously expand as he accepted a number of high administrative positions within the University of London system (of which Imperial College London was a member at the time). He was elected dean of the Faculty of Science at the University of London in late 1918 (a post he held for four years), a member of the University of London's Senate in 1919, and chairman of the Senate's Academic (leadership) Council in 1920, a post which he held until he departed for America in 1924. Whitehead was able to exert his newfound influence to successfully lobby for a new history of science department, help establish a Bachelor of Science degree (previously only Bachelor of Arts degrees had been offered), and make the school more accessible to less wealthy students.

Toward the end of his time in England, Whitehead turned his attention to philosophy. Though he had no advanced training in philosophy, his philosophical work soon became highly regarded. After publishing The Concept of Nature in 1920, he served as president of the Aristotelian Society from 1922 to 1923.

=== Move to the United States, 1924 ===
In 1924, Henry Osborn Taylor invited the 63-year-old Whitehead to join the faculty at Harvard University as a professor of philosophy. The Whiteheads would spend the rest of their lives in the United States.

During his time at Harvard, Whitehead produced some of his most important philosophical contributions. In 1925, he wrote Science and the Modern World, which was immediately hailed as an alternative to the Cartesian dualism then prevalent in popular science. He was elected to the American Academy of Arts and Sciences that same year. He was elected to the American Philosophical Society in 1926. Lectures from 1927 to 1928 were published in 1929 as a book named Process and Reality, which has been compared to Immanuel Kant's Critique of Pure Reason.

Alfred retired from Harvard in 1937.

== Personal life ==
In 1890, Whitehead married Evelyn Wade, an Irishwoman raised in France; they had a daughter, Jessie, and two sons, Thomas and Eric. Thomas followed his father to Harvard in 1931, to teach at the Business School. Eric died in action at the age of 19, while serving in the Royal Flying Corps during World War I.

From 1910, the Whiteheads had a cottage in the village of Lockeridge, near Marlborough, Wiltshire; from there he completed Principia Mathematica.

The Whiteheads remained in the United States after moving to Harvard in 1924. Following his retirement the couple remained in Cambridge, Massachusetts. Whitehead died 30 December 1947. His widow passed away in Cambridge in 1961.

== Mathematics and logic ==
In addition to numerous articles on mathematics, Whitehead wrote three major books on the subject: A Treatise on Universal Algebra (1898), Principia Mathematica (co-written with Bertrand Russell and published in three volumes between 1910 and 1913), and An Introduction to Mathematics (1911). The former two books were aimed exclusively at professional mathematicians, while the latter book was intended for a larger audience, covering the history of mathematics and its philosophical foundations. Principia Mathematica in particular is regarded as one of the most important works in mathematical logic of the 20th century.

In addition to his legacy as a co-writer of Principia Mathematica, Whitehead's theory of "extensive abstraction" is considered foundational for the branch of ontology and computer science known as "mereotopology," a theory describing spatial relations among wholes, parts, parts of parts, and the boundaries between parts.

=== A Treatise on Universal Algebra ===
In A Treatise on Universal Algebra (1898), the term universal algebra had essentially the same meaning that it has today: the study of algebraic structures themselves, rather than examples ("models") of algebraic structures. Whitehead credits William Rowan Hamilton and Augustus De Morgan as originators of the subject matter, and James Joseph Sylvester with coining the term itself.

At the time, structures such as Lie algebras and hyperbolic quaternions drew attention to the need to expand algebraic structures beyond the associatively multiplicative class. In a review Alexander Macfarlane wrote: "The main idea of the work is not unification of the several methods, nor generalization of ordinary algebra so as to include them, but rather the comparative study of their several structures." In a separate review, G. B. Mathews wrote, "It possesses a unity of design which is really remarkable, considering the variety of its themes."

A Treatise on Universal Algebra sought to examine Hermann Grassmann's theory of extension ("Ausdehnungslehre"), Boole's algebra of logic, and Hamilton's quaternions (this last number system was to be taken up in Volume II, which was never finished due to Whitehead's work on Principia Mathematica). Whitehead wrote in the preface:

Such algebras have an intrinsic value for separate detailed study; also they are worthy of comparative study, for the sake of the light thereby thrown on the general theory of symbolic reasoning, and on algebraic symbolism in particular... The idea of a generalized conception of space has been made prominent, in the belief that the properties and operations involved in it can be made to form a uniform method of interpretation of the various algebras.

Whitehead, however, had no results of a general nature. His hope of "form[ing] a uniform method of interpretation of the various algebras" presumably would have been developed in Volume II, had Whitehead completed it. Further work on the subject was minimal until the early 1930s when Garrett Birkhoff and Øystein Ore began publishing on universal algebras.

=== Principia Mathematica ===
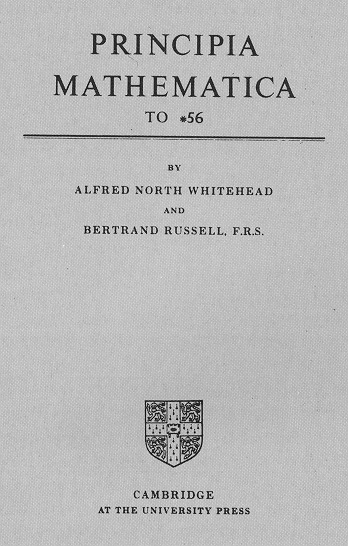
The title page of the shortened version of the Principia Mathematica to *56

Principia Mathematica (1910–1913) is Whitehead's most famous mathematical work. Written with former student Bertrand Russell, Principia Mathematica is considered one of the twentieth century's most important works in mathematics and placed 23rd in a list of the top 100 English-language nonfiction books of the twentieth century by Modern Library.

Principia Mathematica's purpose was to describe a set of axioms and inference rules in symbolic logic from which all mathematical truths could in principle be proven. Whitehead and Russell were working on such a foundational level of mathematics and logic that it took them until page 86 of Volume II to prove that 1+1=2, a proof humorously accompanied by the comment, "The above proposition is occasionally useful."

Whitehead and Russell had thought originally that Principia Mathematica would take a year to complete; it ended up taking them ten years. When it came time for publication, the three-volume work was so long (more than 2,000 pages) and its audience so narrow (professional mathematicians) that it was initially published at a loss of 600 pounds, 300 of which was paid by Cambridge University Press, 200 by the Royal Society of London, and 50 apiece by Whitehead and Russell themselves. Despite the initial loss, today there is likely no major academic library in the world that does not hold a copy of Principia Mathematica.

Principia Mathematica's legacy is mixed. It is generally accepted that Kurt Gödel's incompleteness theorem of 1931 definitively demonstrated that, for any set of axioms and inference rules proposed to encapsulate mathematics, there would in fact be some truths of mathematics that could not be deduced from them, and hence that Principia Mathematica could never achieve its aims. However, Gödel could not have come to this conclusion without Whitehead and Russell's book. In this way, Principia Mathematica's legacy might be described as its key role in disproving the possibility of achieving its own stated goals. But beyond this somewhat ironic legacy, the book popularised modern mathematical logic and drew important connections between logic, epistemology and metaphysics.

=== An Introduction to Mathematics ===
Unlike Whitehead's previous two books on mathematics, An Introduction to Mathematics (1911) was not aimed exclusively at professional mathematicians but was intended for a larger audience. The book covered the nature of mathematics, its unity and internal structure, and its applicability to nature. Whitehead wrote in the opening chapter:

The object of the following Chapters is not to teach mathematics, but to enable students from the very beginning of their course to know what the science is about, and why it is necessarily the foundation of exact thought as applied to natural phenomena.

The book can be seen as an attempt to understand the growth in unity and interconnection of mathematics as a whole, as well as an examination of the mutual influence of mathematics and philosophy, language, and physics. Although the book is little-read, in some ways it prefigures certain points of Whitehead's later work in philosophy and metaphysics.

== Philosophy ==
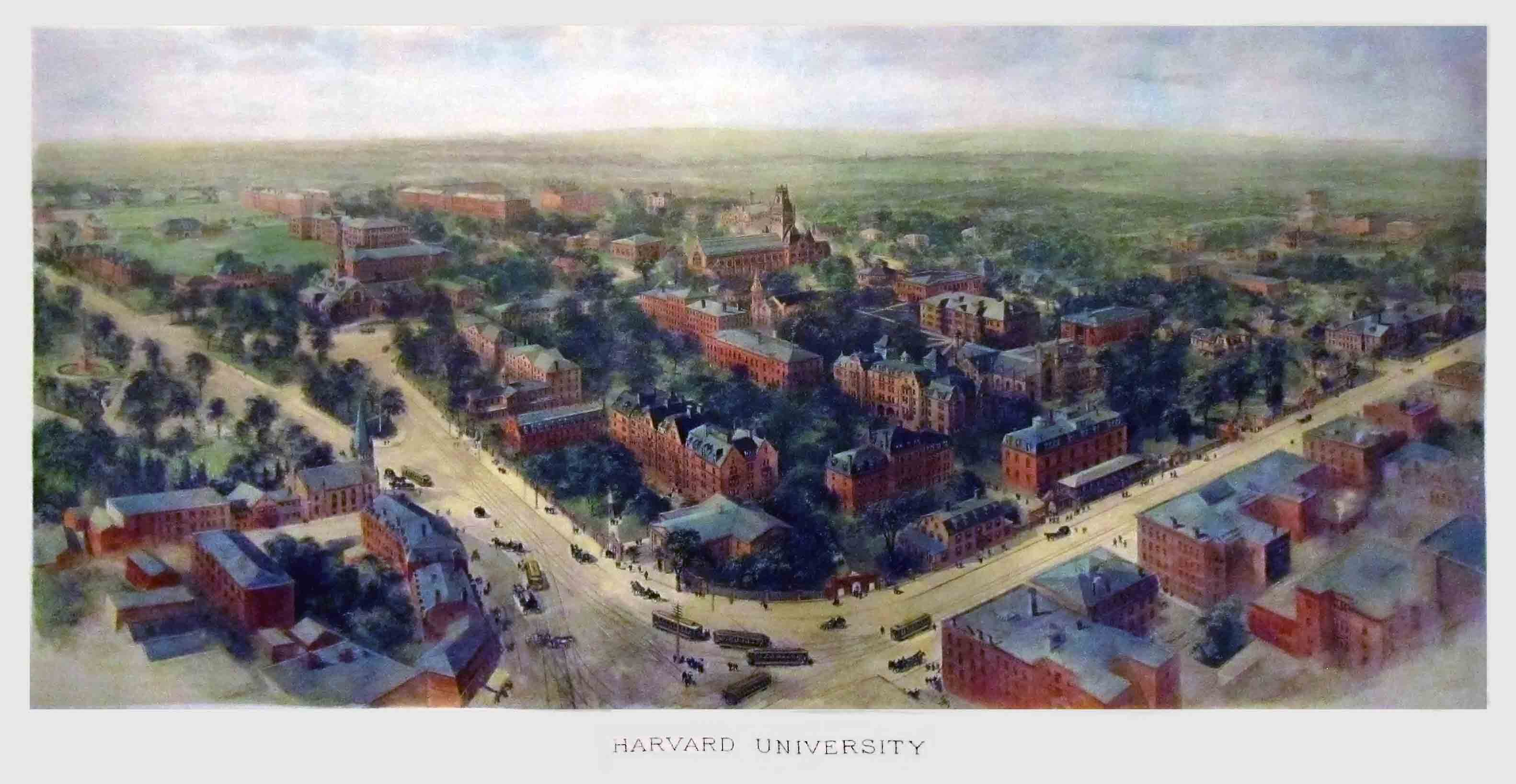
Richard Rummell's 1906 watercolor landscape view of Harvard University, facing northeast. Whitehead taught at Harvard from 1924 to 1937.

Whitehead did not begin his career as a philosopher. In fact, he never had any formal training in philosophy beyond his undergraduate education. Early in his life, he showed great interest in and respect for philosophy and metaphysics, but it is evident that he considered himself a rank amateur. In one letter to his friend and former student Bertrand Russell, after discussing whether science aimed to be explanatory or merely descriptive, he wrote: "This further question lands us in the ocean of metaphysic, onto which my profound ignorance of that science forbids me to enter." Ironically, in later life, Whitehead would become one of the 20th century's foremost metaphysicians.

However, interest in metaphysics – the philosophical investigation of the nature of the universe and existence – had become unfashionable by the time Whitehead began writing in earnest about it in the 1920s. The ever-more impressive accomplishments of empirical science had led to a general consensus in academia that the development of comprehensive metaphysical systems was a waste of time because they were not subject to empirical testing.

Whitehead was unimpressed by this objection. In the notes of one of his students for a 1927 class, Whitehead was quoted as saying: "Every scientific man in order to preserve his reputation has to say he dislikes metaphysics. What he means is he dislikes having his metaphysics criticized." In Whitehead's view, scientists and philosophers make metaphysical assumptions about how the universe works all the time, but such assumptions are not easily seen precisely because they remain unexamined and unquestioned. While Whitehead acknowledged that "philosophers can never hope finally to formulate these metaphysical first principles", he argued that people need to continually reimagine their basic assumptions about how the universe works if philosophy and science are to make any real progress, even if that progress remains permanently asymptotic. For this reason, Whitehead regarded metaphysical investigations as essential to both good science and good philosophy.

Perhaps foremost among what Whitehead considered faulty metaphysical assumptions was the Cartesian idea that reality is fundamentally constructed of bits of matter that exist totally independently of one another, which he rejected in favour of an event-based or "process" ontology in which events are primary and are fundamentally interrelated and dependent on one another. He also argued that the most basic elements of reality can all be regarded as experiential, indeed that everything is constituted by its experience. He used the term "experience" very broadly so that even inanimate processes such as electron collisions are said to manifest some degree of experience. In this, he went against Descartes' separation of two different kinds of real existence, either exclusively material or else exclusively mental. Whitehead referred to his metaphysical system as the "philosophy of organism," but it would become known more widely as "process philosophy."

Whitehead's philosophy was highly original, and soon garnered interest in philosophical circles. After publishing The Concept of Nature in 1920, he served as president of the Aristotelian Society from 1922 to 1923, and Henri Bergson was quoted as saying that Whitehead was "the best philosopher writing in English." So impressive and different was Whitehead's philosophy that in 1924 he was invited to join the faculty at Harvard University as a professor of philosophy at 63 years of age.

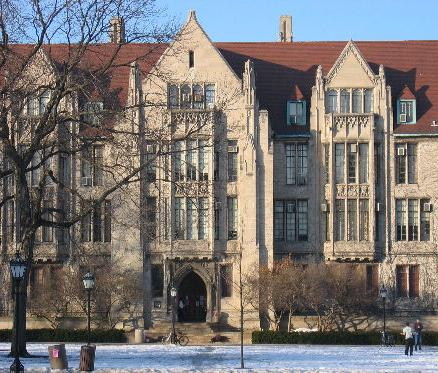
Eckhart Hall at the University of Chicago. Beginning with the arrival of Henry Nelson Wieman in 1927, Chicago's Divinity School become closely associated with Whitehead's thought for about thirty years.

This is not to say that Whitehead's thought was widely accepted or even well understood. His philosophical work is generally considered to be among the most difficult to understand in all of the Western canon. Even professional philosophers struggled to follow Whitehead's writings. One famous story illustrating the level of difficulty of Whitehead's philosophy centres around the delivery of Whitehead's Gifford lectures in 1927–28 – following Arthur Eddington's lectures of the year previous – which Whitehead would later publish as Process and Reality:

Eddington was a marvellous popular lecturer who had enthralled an audience of 600 for his entire course. The same audience turned up to Whitehead's first lecture but it was completely unintelligible, not merely to the world at large but to the elect. My father remarked to me afterwards that if he had not known Whitehead well he would have suspected that it was an imposter making it up as he went along... The audience at subsequent lectures was only about half a dozen in all.

It may not be inappropriate to speculate that some fair portion of the respect generally shown to Whitehead by his philosophical peers at the time arose from their sheer bafflement. The Chicago theologian Shailer Mathews once remarked of Whitehead's 1926 book Religion in the Making: "It is infuriating, and I must say embarrassing as well, to read page after page of relatively familiar words without understanding a single sentence."

However, Mathews' frustration with Whitehead's books did not negatively affect his interest. In fact, there were numerous philosophers and theologians at Chicago's Divinity School who perceived the importance of what Whitehead was doing without fully grasping all of the details and implications. In 1927, they invited one of America's only Whitehead experts, Henry Nelson Wieman, to Chicago to give a lecture explaining Whitehead's thoughts. Wieman's lecture was so brilliant that he was promptly hired to the faculty and taught there for twenty years, and for at least thirty years afterwards Chicago's Divinity School was closely associated with Whitehead's thought.

Shortly after Whitehead's book Process and Reality appeared in 1929, Wieman famously wrote in his 1930 review:

Not many people will read Whitehead's recent book in this generation; not many will read it in any generation. But its influence will radiate through concentric circles of popularization until the common man will think and work in the light of it, not knowing whence the light came. After a few decades of discussion and analysis, one will be able to understand it more readily than can now be done.

Wieman's words proved prophetic. Though Process and Reality has been called "arguably the most impressive single metaphysical text of the twentieth century," it has been little-read and little-understood, partly because it demands – as Isabelle Stengers puts it – "that its readers accept the adventure of the questions that will separate them from every consensus." Whitehead questioned Western philosophy's most dearly held assumptions about how the universe works – but in doing so, he managed to anticipate a number of 21st century scientific and philosophical problems and provide novel solutions.

=== Whitehead's conception of reality ===
Whitehead was convinced that the scientific notion of matter was misleading as a way of describing the ultimate nature of things. In his 1925 book Science and the Modern World, he wrote that:

There persists ... [a] fixed scientific cosmology which presupposes the ultimate fact of an irreducible brute matter, or material, spread through space in a flux of configurations. In itself, such a material is senseless, valueless, purposeless. It just does what it does do, following a fixed routine imposed by external relations which do not spring from the nature of its being. It is this assumption that I call "scientific materialism." Also, it is an assumption which I shall challenge as being entirely unsuited to the scientific situation at which we have now arrived.

In Whitehead's view, there are a number of problems with this notion of "irreducible brute matter". First, it obscures and minimises the importance of change. By thinking of any material thing (like a rock, or a person) as being fundamentally the same thing throughout time, with any changes to it being secondary to its "nature", scientific materialism hides the fact that nothing ever stays the same. For Whitehead, change is fundamental and inescapable; he emphasises that "all things flow".

In Whitehead's view, then, concepts such as "quality", "matter", and "form" are problematic. These "classical" concepts fail to adequately account for change, and overlook the active and experiential nature of the most basic elements of the world. They are useful abstractions but are not the world's basic building blocks. What is ordinarily conceived of as a single person, for instance, is philosophically described as a continuum of overlapping events. After all, people change all the time, if only because they have aged by another second and had some further experience. These occasions of experience are logically distinct but are progressively connected in what Whitehead calls a "society" of events. By assuming that enduring objects are the most real and fundamental things in the universe, materialists have mistaken the abstract for the concrete (what Whitehead calls the "fallacy of misplaced concreteness").

To put it another way, a thing or person is often seen as having a "defining essence" or a "core identity" that is unchanging, and describes what the thing or person really is. In this way of thinking, things and people are seen as fundamentally the same through time, with any changes being qualitative and secondary to their core identity (e.g., "Mark's hair has turned grey as he has gotten older, but he is still the same person"). But in Whitehead's cosmology, the only fundamentally existent things are discrete "occasions of experience" that overlap one another in time and space, and jointly make up the enduring person or thing. On the other hand, what ordinary thinking often regards as "the essence of a thing" or "the identity/core of a person" is an abstract generalisation of what is regarded as that person or thing's most important or salient features across time. Identities do not define people; people define identities. Everything changes from moment to moment and to think of anything as having an "enduring essence" misses the fact that "all things flow," though it is often a useful way of speaking.

Whitehead pointed to the limitations of language as one of the main culprits in maintaining a materialistic way of thinking and acknowledged that it may be difficult to ever wholly move past such ideas in everyday speech. After all, every moment of each person's life can hardly be given a different proper name, and it is easy and convenient to think of people and objects as remaining fundamentally the same things, rather than constantly keeping in mind that each thing is a different thing from what it was a moment ago. Yet the limitations of everyday living and everyday speech should not prevent people from realising that "material substances" or "essences" are a convenient generalised description of a continuum of particular, concrete processes. No one questions that a ten-year-old person is quite different by the time he or she turns thirty years old, and in many ways is not the same person at all; Whitehead points out that it is not philosophically or ontologically sound to think that a person is the same from one second to the next.

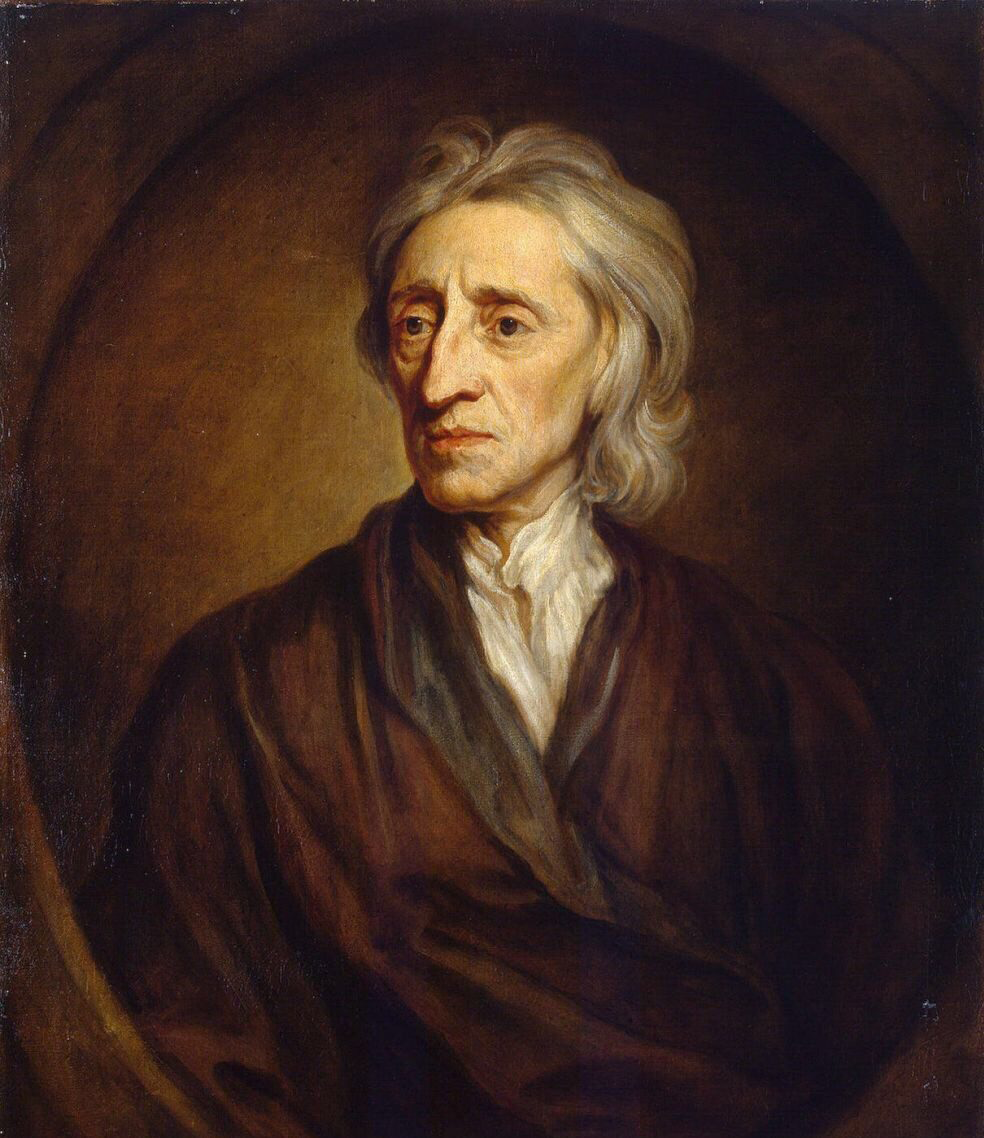
John Locke was one of Whitehead's primary influences. In the preface to Process and Reality, Whitehead wrote: "The writer who most fully anticipated the main positions of the philosophy of organism is John Locke in his Essay."

A second problem with materialism is that it obscures the importance of relations. It sees every object as distinct and discrete from all other objects. Each object is simply an inert clump of matter that is only externally related to other things. The idea of matter as primary makes people think of objects as being fundamentally separate in time and space, and not necessarily related to anything. But in Whitehead's view, relations take a primary role, perhaps even more important than the relata themselves. A student taking notes in one of Whitehead's fall 1924 classes wrote that, "Reality applies to connections, and only relatively to the things connected. (A) is real for (B), and (B) is real for (A), but [they are] not absolutely real independent of each other." In fact, Whitehead describes any entity as in some sense nothing more and nothing less than the sum of its relations to other entities – its synthesis of and reaction to the world around it. A real thing is just that which forces the rest of the universe to in some way conform to it; that is to say, if theoretically, a thing made strictly no difference to any other entity (i.e., it was not related to any other entity), it could not be said to really exist. Relations are not secondary to what a thing is; they are what the thing is.

To Whitehead, an entity is not merely a sum of its relations, but also a valuation of them and reaction to them. For Whitehead, creativity is the absolute principle of existence, and every entity (whether it is a human being, a tree, or an electron) has some degree of novelty in how it responds to other entities and is not fully determined by causal or mechanistic laws. Most entities do not have consciousness. As a human being's actions cannot always be predicted, the same can be said of where a tree's roots will grow, or how an electron will move, or whether it will rain tomorrow. Moreover, the inability to predict an electron's movement (for instance) is not due to faulty understanding or inadequate technology; rather, the fundamental creativity/freedom of all entities means that there will always remain phenomena that are unpredictable.

The other side of creativity/freedom as the absolute principle is that every entity is constrained by the social structure of existence (i.e., its relations); each actual entity must conform to the settled conditions of the world around it. Freedom always exists within limits. But an entity's uniqueness and individuality arise from its own self-determination as to just how it will take account of the world within the limits that have been set for it.

In summary, Whitehead rejects the idea of separate and unchanging bits of matter as the most basic building blocks of reality, in favour of the idea of reality as interrelated events in the process. He conceives of reality as composed of processes of dynamic "becoming" rather than static "being", emphasising that all physical things change and evolve and that changeless "essences" such as matter are mere abstractions from the interrelated events that are the final real things that make up the world.

=== Theory of perception ===
Since Whitehead's metaphysics described a universe in which all entities experience, he needed a new way of describing perception that was not limited to living, self-conscious beings. The term he coined was "prehension," which comes from the Latin prehensio, meaning "to seize". The term is meant to indicate a kind of perception that can be conscious or unconscious, applying to people as well as electrons. It is also intended to make clear Whitehead's rejection of the theory of representative perception, in which the mind only has private ideas about other entities. For Whitehead, the term "prehension" indicates that the perceiver actually incorporates aspects of the perceived thing into itself. In this way, entities are constituted by their perceptions and relations, rather than being independent of them. Further, Whitehead regards perception as occurring in two modes, causal efficacy (or "physical prehension") and presentational immediacy (or "conceptual prehension").

Whitehead describes causal efficacy as "the experience dominating the primitive living organisms, which have a sense for the fate from which they have emerged, and the fate towards which they go." It is, in other words, the sense of causal relations between entities, a feeling of being influenced and affected by the surrounding environment, unmediated by the senses. Presentational immediacy, on the other hand, is what is usually referred to as "pure sense perception", unmediated by any causal or symbolic interpretation, even unconscious interpretation. In other words, it is pure appearance, which may or may not be delusive (e.g., mistaking an image in a mirror for "the real thing").

In higher organisms (like people), these two modes of perception combine into what Whitehead terms "symbolic reference", which links appearance with causation in a process that is so automatic that both people and animals have difficulty refraining from it. By way of illustration, Whitehead uses the example of a person's encounter with a chair. An ordinary person looks up, sees a coloured shape, and immediately infers that it is a chair. However, an artist, Whitehead supposes, "might not have jumped to the notion of a chair", but instead "might have stopped at the mere contemplation of a beautiful colour and a beautiful shape." This is not the normal human reaction; most people place objects in categories by habit and instinct, without even thinking about it. Moreover, animals do the same thing. Using the same example, Whitehead points out that a dog "would have acted immediately on the hypothesis of a chair and would have jumped onto it by way of using it as such." In this way, symbolic reference is a fusion of pure sense perceptions on the one hand and causal relations on the other, and it is in fact the causal relationships that dominate the more basic mentality (as the dog illustrates), while it is the sense perceptions which indicate a higher grade mentality (as the artist illustrates).

=== Evolution and value ===
Whitehead believed that when asking questions about the basic facts of existence, questions about value and purpose can never be fully escaped. This is borne out in his thoughts on abiogenesis, or the hypothetical natural process by which life arises from simple organic compounds.

Whitehead makes the startling observation that "life is comparatively deficient in survival value." If humans can only exist for about a hundred years, and rocks for eight hundred million, then one is forced to ask why complex organisms ever evolved in the first place; as Whitehead humorously notes, "they certainly did not appear because they were better at that game than the rocks around them." He then observes that the mark of higher forms of life is that they are actively engaged in modifying their environment, an activity which he theorises is directed toward the three-fold goal of living, living well, and living better. In other words, Whitehead sees life as directed toward the purpose of increasing its own satisfaction. Without such a goal, he sees the rise of life as totally unintelligible.

For Whitehead, there is no such thing as wholly inert matter. Instead, all things have some measure of freedom or creativity, however small, which allows them to be at least partly self-directed. The process philosopher David Ray Griffin coined the term "panexperientialism" (the idea that all entities experience) to describe Whitehead's view, and to distinguish it from panpsychism (the idea that all matter has consciousness).

=== God ===
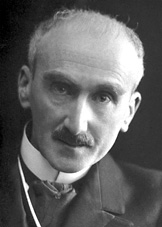
Henri Bergson

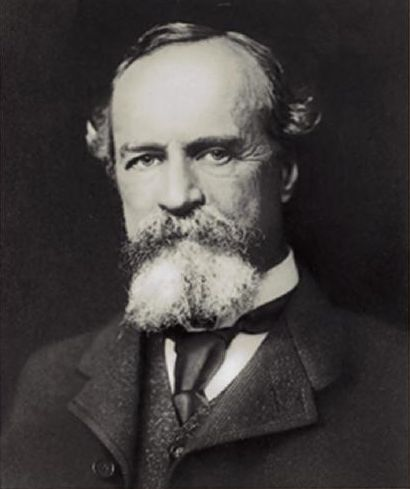
William James

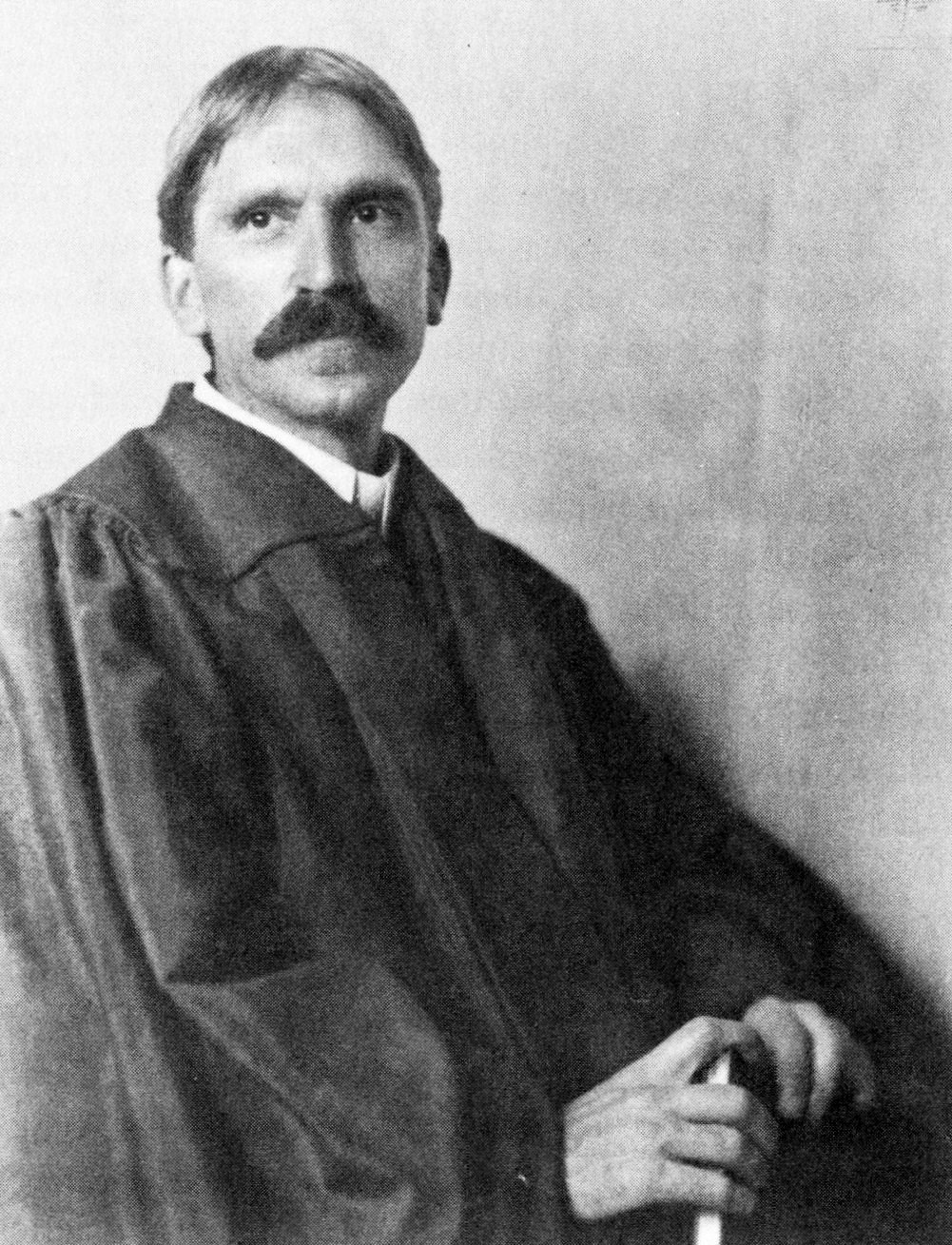
John Dewey

"I am also greatly indebted to Bergson, William James, and John Dewey. One of my preoccupations has been to rescue their type of thought from the charge of anti-intellectualism, which rightly or wrongly has been associated with it." – Alfred North Whitehead, Process and Reality, preface.

Whitehead's idea of God differs from traditional monotheistic notions. Perhaps his most famous and pointed criticism of the Christian conception of God is that "the Church gave unto God the attributes which belonged exclusively to Caesar." Here, Whitehead is criticising Christianity for defining God as primarily a divine king who imposes his will on the world, and whose most important attribute is power. As opposed to the most widely accepted forms of Christianity, Whitehead emphasised an idea of God that he called "the brief Galilean vision of humility":

It does not emphasize the ruling Caesar, or the ruthless moralist, or the unmoved mover. It dwells upon the tender elements in the world, which slowly and in quietness operates by love; and it finds purpose in the present immediacy of a kingdom not of this world. Love neither rules, nor is it unmoved; also it is a little oblivious as to morals. It does not look to the future; for it finds its own reward in the immediate present.

For Whitehead, God is not necessarily tied to religion. Rather than springing primarily from religious faith, Whitehead saw God as necessary for his metaphysical system. His system required that an order exist among possibilities, an order that allowed for novelty in the world and provided an aim to all entities. Whitehead posited that these ordered potentials exist in what he called the primordial nature of God. However, Whitehead was also interested in religious experience. This led him to reflect more intensively on what he saw as the second nature of God, the consequent nature. Whitehead's conception of God as a "dipolar" entity has called for fresh theological thinking.

The primordial nature he described as "the unlimited conceptual realization of the absolute wealth of potentiality" – i.e., the unlimited possibility of the universe. This primordial nature is eternal and unchanging, providing entities in the universe with possibilities for realisation. Whitehead also calls this primordial aspect "the lure for feeling, the eternal urge of desire," pulling the entities in the universe toward as-yet unrealised possibilities.

God's consequent nature, on the other hand, is anything but unchanging; it is God's reception of the world's activity. As Whitehead puts it, "[God] saves the world as it passes into the immediacy of his own life. It is the judgment of a tenderness which loses nothing that can be saved." In other words, God saves and cherishes all experiences forever, and those experiences go on to change the way God interacts with the world. In this way, God is really changed by what happens in the world and the wider universe, lending the actions of finite creatures an eternal significance.

Whitehead thus sees God and the world as fulfilling one another. He sees entities in the world as fluent and changing things that yearn for a permanence which only God can provide by taking them into God's self, thereafter changing God and affecting the rest of the universe throughout time. On the other hand, he sees God as permanent but as deficient in actuality and change: alone, God is merely eternally unrealised possibilities and requires the world to actualise them. God gives creatures permanence, while the creatures give God actuality and change. Here it is worthwhile to quote Whitehead at length:

"In this way God is completed by the individual, fluent satisfactions of finite fact, and the temporal occasions are completed by their everlasting union with their transformed selves, purged into conformation with the eternal order which is the final absolute 'wisdom.' The final summary can only be expressed in terms of a group of antitheses, whose apparent self-contradictions depend on neglect of the diverse categories of existence. In each antithesis there is a shift of meaning which converts the opposition into a contrast.

"It is as true to say that God is permanent and the World fluent, as that the World is permanent and God is fluent.

"It is as true to say that God is one and the World many, as that the World is one and God many.

"It is as true to say that, in comparison with the World, God is actual eminently, as that, in comparison with God, the World is actual eminently.

"It is as true to say that the World is immanent in God, as that God is immanent in the World.

"It is as true to say that God transcends the World, as that the World transcends God.

"It is as true to say that God creates the World, as that the World creates God...

"What is done in the world is transformed into a reality in heaven, and the reality in heaven passes back into the world... In this sense, God is the great companion – the fellow-sufferer who understands."

The above quote inspired the movement known as process theology.

=== Religion ===
For Whitehead, the core of religion was individual. While he acknowledged that individuals cannot ever be fully separated from their society, he argued that life is an internal fact for its own sake before it is an external fact relating to others. His most famous remark on religion is that "religion is what the individual does with his own solitariness ... and if you are never solitary, you are never religious." Whitehead saw religion as a system of general truths that transformed a person's character. He took special care to note that while religion is often a good influence, it is not necessarily good – an idea which he called a "dangerous delusion" (e.g., a religion might encourage the violent extermination of a rival religion's adherents).

However, while Whitehead saw religion as beginning in solitariness, he also saw religion as necessarily expanding beyond the individual. In keeping with his process metaphysics in which relations are primary, he wrote that religion necessitates the realisation of "the value of the objective world which is a community derivative from the interrelations of its component individuals." In other words, the universe is a community which makes itself whole through the relatedness of each individual entity to all the others; meaning and value do not exist for the individual alone, but only in the context of the universal community. Whitehead writes further that each entity "can find no such value till it has merged its individual claim with that of the objective universe. Religion is world loyalty. The spirit at once surrenders itself to this universal claim and appropriates it for itself." In this way, the individual and universal/social aspects of religion are mutually dependent. A connection between the works of William DeWitt Hyde and Whitehead further elucidates this necessary duality of social and individual roles in religious experience. Whitehead also described religion more technically as "an ultimate craving to infuse into the insistent particularity of emotion that non-temporal generality which primarily belongs to conceptual thought alone." In other words, religion takes deeply felt emotions and contextualises them within a system of general truths about the world, helping people to identify their wider meaning and significance. For Whitehead, religion served as a kind of bridge between philosophy and the emotions and purposes of a particular society. It is the task of religion to make philosophy applicable to the everyday lives of ordinary people.

=== Views on education ===
Whitehead showed a deep concern for educational reform at all levels. In addition to his numerous individually written works on the subject, Whitehead was appointed by Britain's Prime Minister David Lloyd George as part of a 20-person committee to investigate the educational systems and practices of the UK in 1921 and recommend reform.

Whitehead's most complete work on education is the 1929 book The Aims of Education and Other Essays, which collected numerous essays and addresses by Whitehead on the subject published between 1912 and 1927. The essay from which Aims of Education derived its name was delivered as an address in 1916 when Whitehead was president of the London Branch of the Mathematical Association. In it, he cautioned against the teaching of what he called "inert ideas" – ideas that are disconnected scraps of information, with no application to real life or culture. He opined that "education with inert ideas is not only useless: it is, above all things, harmful."

Rather than teach small parts of a large number of subjects, Whitehead advocated teaching a relatively few important concepts that the student could organically link to many different areas of knowledge, discovering their application in actual life. For Whitehead, education should be the exact opposite of the multidisciplinary, value-free school model – it should be transdisciplinary, and laden with values and general principles that provide students with a bedrock of wisdom and help them to make connections between areas of knowledge that are usually regarded as separate.

In order to make this sort of teaching a reality, however, Whitehead pointed to the need to minimise the importance of (or radically alter) standard examinations for school entrance. Whitehead writes:

Every school is bound on pain of extinction to train its boys for a small set of definite examinations. No headmaster has a free hand to develop his general education or his specialist studies in accordance with the opportunities of his school, which are created by its staff, its environment, its class of boys, and its endowments. I suggest that no system of external tests which aims primarily at examining individual scholars can result in anything but educational waste.

Whitehead argued that curriculum should be developed specifically for its own students by its own staff, or else risk total stagnation, interrupted only by occasional movements from one group of inert ideas to another.

Above all else in his educational writings, Whitehead emphasised the importance of imagination and the free play of ideas. In his essay "Universities and Their Function", Whitehead writes provocatively on imagination:

Imagination is not to be divorced from the facts: it is a way of illuminating the facts. It works by eliciting the general principles which apply to the facts, as they exist, and then by an intellectual survey of alternative possibilities which are consistent with those principles. It enables men to construct an intellectual vision of a new world.

Whitehead's philosophy of education might adequately be summarised in his statement that "knowledge does not keep any better than fish". In other words, bits of disconnected knowledge are meaningless; all knowledge must find some imaginative application to the students' own lives, or else it becomes useless trivia, and the students themselves become good at parroting facts but not thinking for themselves.

== Legacy ==
The two-volume biography of Whitehead by Victor Lowe is the most definitive presentation of the life of Whitehead. However, many details of Whitehead's life remain obscure because he left no Nachlass (personal archive); his family carried out his instructions that all of his papers be destroyed after his death. Additionally, Whitehead was known for his "almost fanatical belief in the right to privacy," and for writing very few personal letters of the kind that would help to gain insight on his life. Wrote Lowe in his preface, "No professional biographer in his right mind would touch him."

Led by Executive Editor Brian G. Henning and General Editor George R. Lucas Jr., the Whitehead Research Project of the Center for Process Studies is currently working on a critical edition of Whitehead's published and unpublished works. The first volume of the Edinburgh Critical Edition of the Complete Works of Alfred North Whitehead was published in 2017 by Paul A. Bogaard and Jason Bell as The Harvard Lectures of Alfred North Whitehead, 1924–1925: The Philosophical Presuppositions of Science.

=== Influence ===
Isabelle Stengers wrote that "Whiteheadians are recruited among both philosophers and theologians, and the palette has been enriched by practitioners from the most diverse horizons, from ecology to feminism, practices that unite political struggle and spirituality with the sciences of education." In recent decades, attention to Whitehead's work has become more widespread, with interest extending to intellectuals in Europe and China, and coming from such diverse fields as ecology, physics, biology, education, economics, and psychology. One of the first theologians to attempt to interact with Whitehead's thought was the future Archbishop of Canterbury, William Temple. In Temple's Gifford Lectures of 1932–1934 (subsequently published as "Nature, Man and God"), Whitehead is one of a number of philosophers of the emergent evolution approach with which Temple interacts. However, it was not until the 1970s and 1980s that Whitehead's thought drew much attention outside of a small group of philosophers and theologians, primarily Americans, and even today he is not considered especially influential outside relatively specialised circles.

Early followers of Whitehead were found primarily at the University of Chicago Divinity School, where Henry Nelson Wieman initiated an interest in Whitehead's work that would last for about thirty years. Professors such as Wieman, Charles Hartshorne, Bernard Loomer, Bernard Meland, and Daniel Day Williams made Whitehead's philosophy arguably the most important intellectual thread running through the divinity school. They taught generations of Whitehead scholars, the most notable of whom is John B. Cobb.

Although interest in Whitehead has since faded at Chicago's divinity school, Cobb effectively grabbed the torch and planted it firmly in Claremont, California, where he began teaching at Claremont School of Theology in 1958 and founded the Center for Process Studies with David Ray Griffin in 1973. Largely due to Cobb's influence, today Claremont remains strongly identified with Whitehead's process thought.

But while Claremont remains the most concentrated hub of Whiteheadian activity, the place where Whitehead's thought currently seems to be growing the most quickly is in China. In order to address the challenges of modernisation and industrialisation, China has begun to blend traditions of Taoism, Buddhism, and Confucianism with Whitehead's "constructive post-modern" philosophy in order to create an "ecological civilization". To date, the Chinese government has encouraged the building of twenty-three university-based centres for the study of Whitehead's philosophy, and books by process philosophers John Cobb and David Ray Griffin are becoming required reading for Chinese graduate students. Cobb has attributed China's interest in process philosophy partly to Whitehead's stress on the mutual interdependence of humanity and nature, as well as his emphasis on an educational system that includes the teaching of values rather than simply bare facts.

Overall, however, Whitehead's influence is difficult to characterise. In English-speaking countries his primary works are little-studied outside Claremont and a select number of liberal graduate-level theology and philosophy programmes. Outside these circles, his influence is relatively small and diffuse and has tended to come chiefly through the work of his students and admirers rather than Whitehead himself. For instance, Whitehead was a teacher and long-time friend and collaborator of Bertrand Russell, and he also taught and supervised the dissertation of Willard Van Orman Quine, both of whom are important figures in analytic philosophy – the dominant strain of philosophy in English-speaking countries in the 20th century. Whitehead has also had high-profile admirers in the continental tradition, such as French post-structuralist philosopher Gilles Deleuze, who once dryly remarked of Whitehead that "he stands provisionally as the last great Anglo-American philosopher before Wittgenstein's disciples spread their misty confusion, sufficiency, and terror." French sociologist and anthropologist Bruno Latour even went so far as to call Whitehead "the greatest philosopher of the 20th century."

Deleuze's and Latour's opinions, however, are minority ones, as Whitehead has not been recognised as particularly influential within the most dominant philosophical schools. It is impossible to say exactly why Whitehead's influence has not been more widespread, but it may be partly due to his metaphysical ideas seeming somewhat counterintuitive (such as his assertion that matter is an abstraction), or his inclusion of theistic elements in his philosophy, or the perception of metaphysics itself as passé, or simply the sheer difficulty and density of his prose.

==== Process philosophy and theology ====
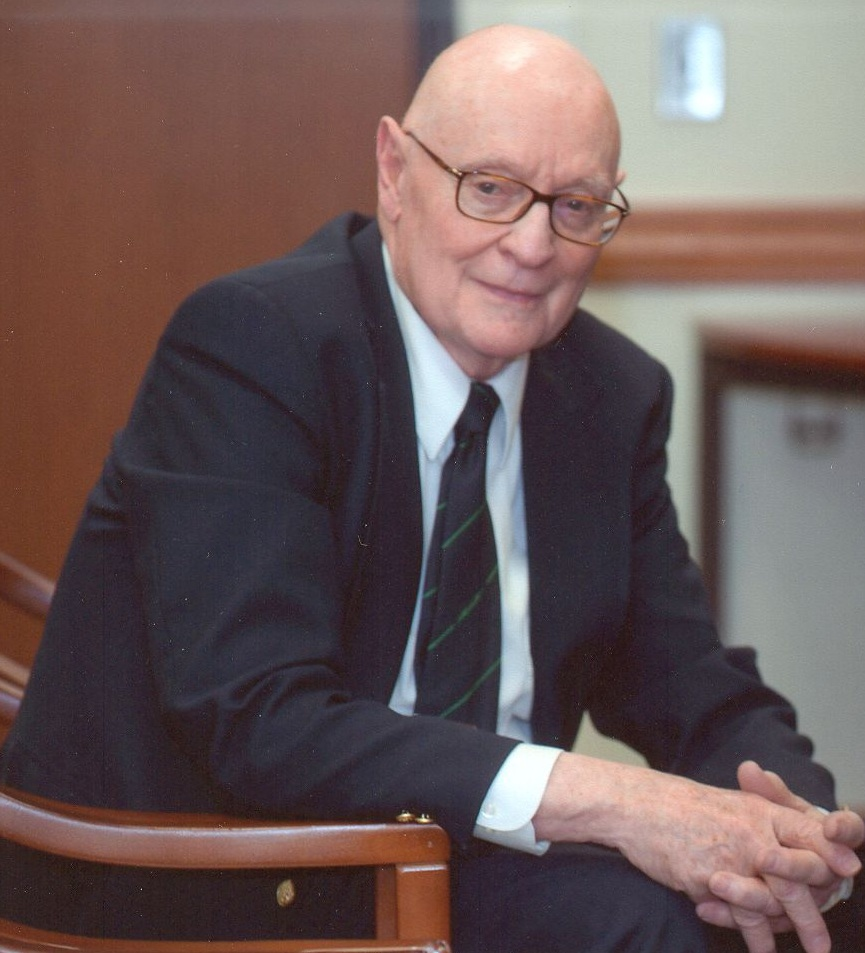
Philosopher Nicholas Rescher. Rescher was a proponent of both Whiteheadian process philosophy and American pragmatism.

Historically, Whitehead's work has been most influential in the field of American progressive theology. The most important early proponent of Whitehead's thought in a theological context was Charles Hartshorne, who spent a semester at Harvard as Whitehead's teaching assistant in 1925, and is widely credited with developing Whitehead's process philosophy into a full-blown process theology. Other notable process theologians include John B. Cobb, David Ray Griffin, Marjorie Hewitt Suchocki, C. Robert Mesle, Roland Faber, and Catherine Keller.

Process theology typically stresses God's relational nature. Rather than seeing God as impassive or emotionless, process theologians view God as "the fellow sufferer who understands," and as the being who is supremely affected by temporal events. Hartshorne points out that people would not praise a human ruler who was unaffected by either the joys or sorrows of his followers – so why would this be a praiseworthy quality in God? Instead, as the being who is most affected by the world, God is the being who can most appropriately respond to the world. However, process theology has been formulated in a wide variety of ways. C. Robert Mesle, for instance, advocates a "process naturalism" – i.e., a process theology without God.

In fact, process theology is difficult to define because process theologians are so diverse and transdisciplinary in their views and interests. John B. Cobb is a process theologian who has also written books on biology and economics. Roland Faber and Catherine Keller integrate Whitehead with poststructuralist, postcolonialist, and feminist theory. Charles Birch was both a theologian and a geneticist. Franklin I. Gamwell writes on theology and political theory. In Syntheism – Creating God in The Internet Age, futurologists Alexander Bard and Jan Söderqvist repeatedly credit Whitehead for the process theology they see rising out of the participatory culture expected to dominate the digital era.

Process philosophy is even more difficult to pin down than process theology. In practice, the two fields cannot be neatly separated. The 32-volume State University of New York series in constructive postmodern thought edited by process philosopher and theologian David Ray Griffin displays the range of areas in which different process philosophers work, including physics, ecology, medicine, public policy, nonviolence, politics, and psychology.

One philosophical school which has historically had a close relationship with process philosophy is American pragmatism. Whitehead himself thought highly of William James and John Dewey, and acknowledged his indebtedness to them in the preface to Process and Reality. Charles Hartshorne (along with Paul Weiss) edited the collected papers of Charles Sanders Peirce, one of the founders of pragmatism. Noted neopragmatist Richard Rorty was in turn a student of Hartshorne.

==== Science ====
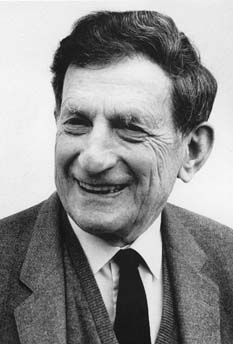
Theoretical physicist David Bohm. Bohm is one example of a scientist influenced by Whitehead's philosophy.

Scientists of the early 20th century for whom Whitehead's work has been influential include physical chemist Ilya Prigogine, biologist Conrad Hal Waddington, and geneticists Charles Birch and Sewall Wright. Henry Murray dedicated his "Explorations in Personality" to Whitehead, a contemporary at Harvard.

In physics, Whitehead's theory of gravitation articulated a view that might perhaps be regarded as dual to Albert Einstein's general relativity. It has been strongly criticised. Yutaka Tanaka suggested that the gravitational constant disagrees with experimental findings, and proposed that Einstein's work does not actually refute Whitehead's formulation. Whitehead's view has now been rendered obsolete, with the discovery of gravitational waves, phenomena observed locally that largely violate the kind of local flatness of space that Whitehead assumes. Consequently, Whitehead's cosmology must be regarded as a local approximation, and his assumption of a uniform spatio-temporal geometry, Minkowskian in particular, as an often-locally-adequate approximation. An exact replacement of Whitehead's cosmology would need to admit a Riemannian geometry. Also, although Whitehead himself gave only secondary consideration to quantum theory, his metaphysics of processes has proved attractive to some physicists in that field. Henry Stapp and David Bohm are among those whose work has been influenced by Whitehead.

In the 21st century, Whiteheadian thought is still a stimulating influence: Timothy E. Eastman and Hank Keeton's Physics and Whitehead (2004) and Michael Epperson's Quantum Mechanics and the Philosophy of Alfred North Whitehead (2004) and Foundations of Relational Realism: A Topological Approach to Quantum Mechanics and the Philosophy of Nature (2013), aim to offer Whiteheadian approaches to physics. Brian G. Henning, Adam Scarfe, and Dorion Sagan's Beyond Mechanism (2013) and Rupert Sheldrake's Science Set Free (2012) are examples of Whiteheadian approaches to biology.

==== Ecology, economy, and sustainability ====
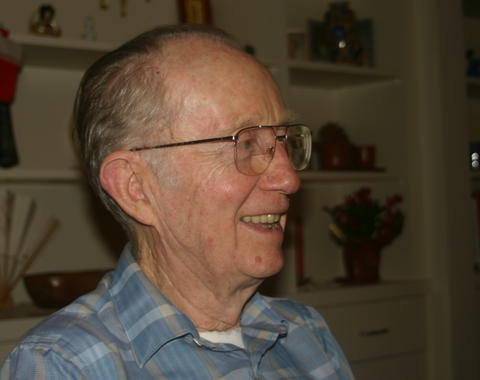
Theologian, philosopher, and environmentalist John B. Cobb founded the Center for Process Studies in Claremont, California with David Ray Griffin in 1973, and is often regarded as the preeminent scholar in the field of process philosophy and process theology.

One of the most promising applications of Whitehead's thought in recent years has been in the area of ecological civilisation, sustainability and environmental ethics.

"Because Whitehead's holistic metaphysics of value lends itself so readily to an ecological point of view, many see his work as a promising alternative to the traditional mechanistic worldview, providing a detailed metaphysical picture of a world constituted by a web of interdependent relations."

This work has been pioneered by John B. Cobb, whose book Is It Too Late? A Theology of Ecology (1971) was the first single-authored book on environmental ethics. Cobb also co-authored a book with leading ecological economist and steady-state theorist Herman Daly entitled For the Common Good: Redirecting the Economy toward Community, the Environment, and a Sustainable Future (1989), which applied Whitehead's thought to economics, and received the Grawemeyer Award for Ideas Improving World Order. Cobb followed this with a second book, Sustaining the Common Good: A Christian Perspective on the Global Economy (1994), which aimed to challenge "economists' zealous faith in the great god of growth."

==== Education ====
Whitehead is widely known for his influence in education theory. His philosophy inspired the formation of the Association for Process Philosophy of Education (APPE), which published eleven volumes of a journal titled Process Papers on process philosophy and education from 1996 to 2008. Whitehead's theories on education also led to the formation of new modes of learning and new models of teaching.

One such model is the ANISA model developed by Daniel C. Jordan, which sought to address a lack of understanding of the nature of people in current education systems. As Jordan and Raymond P. Shepard put it: "Because it has not defined the nature of man, education is in the untenable position of having to devote its energies to the development of curricula without any coherent ideas about the nature of the creature for whom they are intended."

Another model is the FEELS model developed by Xie Bangxiu and deployed successfully in China. "FEELS" stands for five things in curriculum and education: Flexible-goals, Engaged-learner, Embodied-knowledge, Learning-through-interactions, and Supportive-teacher. It is used for understanding and evaluating educational curriculum under the assumption that the purpose of education is to "help a person become whole." This work is in part the product of cooperation between Chinese government organisations and the Institute for the Postmodern Development of China.

Whitehead's philosophy of education has also found institutional support in Canada, where the University of Saskatchewan created a Process Philosophy Research Unit and sponsored several conferences on process philosophy and education. Howard Woodhouse at the University of Saskatchewan remains a strong proponent of Whiteheadian education.

Three recent books which further develop Whitehead's philosophy of education include: Modes of Learning: Whitehead's Metaphysics and the Stages of Education (2012) by George Allan; The Adventure of Education: Process Philosophers on Learning, Teaching, and Research (2009) by Adam Scarfe; and "Educating for an Ecological Civilization: Interdisciplinary, Experiential, and Relational Learning" (2017) edited by Marcus Ford and Stephen Rowe. "Beyond the Modern University: Toward a Constructive Postmodern University," (2002) is another text that explores the importance of Whitehead's metaphysics for thinking about higher education.

==== Business administration ====
Whitehead has had some influence on the philosophy of business administration and organisational theory. This has led in part to a focus on identifying and investigating the effect of temporal events (as opposed to static things) within organisations through an "organization studies" discourse that accommodates a variety of "weak" and "strong" process perspectives from a number of philosophers. One of the leading figures having an explicitly Whiteheadian and panexperientialist stance towards management is Mark Dibben, who works in what he calls "applied process thought" to articulate a philosophy of management and business administration as part of a wider examination of the social sciences through the lens of process metaphysics. For Dibben, this allows "a comprehensive exploration of life as perpetually active experiencing, as opposed to occasional – and thoroughly passive – happening." Dibben has published two books on applied process thought, Applied Process Thought I: Initial Explorations in Theory and Research (2008), and Applied Process Thought II: Following a Trail Ablaze (2009), as well as other papers in this vein in the fields of philosophy of management and business ethics.

Margaret Stout and Carrie M. Staton have also written recently on the mutual influence of Whitehead and Mary Parker Follett, a pioneer in the fields of organisational theory and organisational behaviour. Stout and Staton see both Whitehead and Follett as sharing an ontology that "understands becoming as a relational process; difference as being related, yet unique; and the purpose of becoming as harmonizing difference." This connection is further analysed by Stout and Jeannine M. Love in Integrative Process: Follettian Thinking from Ontology to Administration.

==== Political views ====
Whitehead's political views sometimes appear to be libertarian without the label. He wrote:

Now the intercourse between individuals and between social groups takes one of two forms, force or persuasion. Commerce is the great example of intercourse by way of persuasion. War, slavery, and governmental compulsion exemplify the reign of force.

On the other hand, many Whitehead scholars read his work as providing a philosophical foundation for the social liberalism of the New Liberal movement that was prominent throughout Whitehead's adult life. Morris wrote that "... there is good reason for claiming that Whitehead shared the social and political ideals of the new liberals.". However, Whitehead's comment addresses means and methods, not "ideals" or pretexts or excuses.

== Works ==
Books written by Whitehead, listed by date of publication.

- A Treatise on Universal Algebra with Applications. Cambridge: Cambridge University Press, 1898. ISBN 1-4297-0032-7. Available online via Internet Archive
- The Axioms of Descriptive Geometry. Cambridge: Cambridge University Press, 1907. Available online at http://quod.lib.umich.edu/u/umhistmath/ABN2643.0001.001.
- with Bertrand Russell. Principia Mathematica, Volume I. Cambridge: Cambridge University Press, 1910. Available online at http://www.hti.umich.edu/cgi/b/bib/bibperm?q1=AAT3201.0001.001. Vol. 1 to *56 is available as a CUP paperback.
- An Introduction to Mathematics. Cambridge: Cambridge University Press, 1911. Available online at http://quod.lib.umich.edu/u/umhistmath/AAW5995.0001.001. Vol. 56 of the Great Books of the Western World series.
- with Bertrand Russell. Principia Mathematica, Volume II. Cambridge: Cambridge University Press, 1912. Available online at http://www.hti.umich.edu/cgi/b/bib/bibperm?q1=AAT3201.0002.001.
- with Bertrand Russell. Principia Mathematica, Volume III. Cambridge: Cambridge University Press, 1913. Available online at http://www.hti.umich.edu/cgi/b/bib/bibperm?q1=AAT3201.0003.001.
- The Organization of Thought Educational and Scientific. London: Williams & Norgate, 1917. Available online at https://archive.org/details/organisationofth00whit.
- An Enquiry Concerning the Principles of Natural Knowledge. Cambridge: Cambridge University Press, 1919. Available online at https://archive.org/details/enquiryconcernpr00whitrich.
- The Concept of Nature. Cambridge: Cambridge University Press, 1920. Based on the November 1919 Tarner Lectures delivered at Trinity College. Available online at https://archive.org/details/cu31924012068593.
- The Principle of Relativity with Applications to Physical Science. Cambridge: Cambridge University Press, 1922.
- Science and the Modern World. New York: Macmillan Company, 1925. Vol. 55 of the Great Books of the Western World series.
- Religion in the Making. New York: Macmillan Company, 1926. Based on the 1926 Lowell Lectures.
- Symbolism, Its Meaning and Effect. New York: Macmillan Co., 1927. Based on the 1927 Barbour-Page Lectures delivered at the University of Virginia.
- Process and Reality: An Essay in Cosmology. New York: Macmillan Company, 1929. Based on the 1927–28 Gifford Lectures delivered at the University of Edinburgh. The 1978 Free Press "corrected edition" edited by David Ray Griffin and Donald W. Sherburne corrects many errors in both the British and American editions and also provides a comprehensive index.
- The Aims of Education and Other Essays. New York: Macmillan Company, 1929.
- The Function of Reason. Princeton: Princeton University Press, 1929. Based on the March 1929 Louis Clark Vanuxem Foundation Lectures delivered at Princeton University.
- Adventures of Ideas. New York: Macmillan Company, 1933. Also published by Cambridge: Cambridge University Press, 1933.
- Nature and Life. Chicago: University of Chicago Press, 1934.
- Modes of Thought. New York: MacMillan Company, 1938.
- "Mathematics and the Good." In The Philosophy of Alfred North Whitehead, edited by Paul Arthur Schilpp, 666–681. Evanston and Chicago: Northwestern University Press, 1941.
- "Immortality." In The Philosophy of Alfred North Whitehead, edited by Paul Arthur Schilpp, 682–700. Evanston and Chicago: Northwestern University Press, 1941.
- Essays in Science and Philosophy. London: Philosophical Library, 1947.
- with Allison Heartz Johnson, ed. The Wit and Wisdom of Whitehead. Boston: Beacon Press, 1948.

In addition, the Whitehead Research Project of the Center for Process Studies is currently working on a critical edition of Whitehead's writings, which is set to include notes taken by Whitehead's students during his Harvard classes, correspondence, and corrected editions of his books.

- Paul A. Bogaard and Jason Bell, eds. The Harvard Lectures of Alfred North Whitehead, 1924–1925: Philosophical Presuppositions of Science. Cambridge: Cambridge University Press, 2017.

== See also ==
- Great refusal
- Pancreativism
- Relationalism
- Speculative philosophy
- Speculative realism
