= Stascha Rohmer =

German philosopher (born 1966)

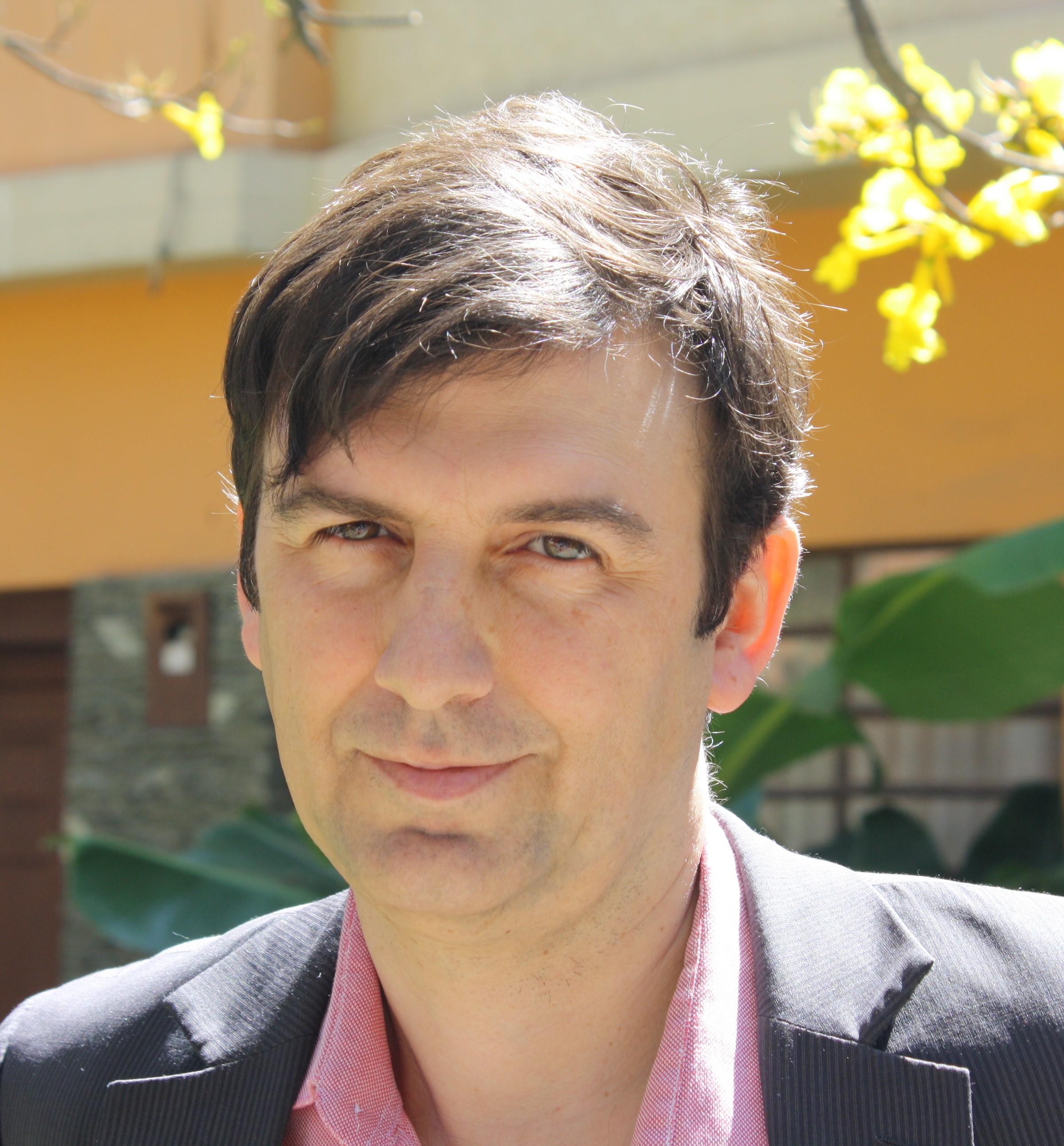
Rohmer in 2017

Stascha Rohmer (born June 29 June 1966 in Trier, Germany) is a German philosopher. His main research topics are Theoretical philosophy, German idealism, Anthropology, Philosophy of Nature and the Philosophy of Law. He is a specialist of the Metaphysics of Hegel and Alfred North Whitehead and since 2008 permanent member of the Whitehead Research Project in the United States. Currently he holds an Interim professorship at the Charles III University of Madrid in Spain.

== Biography ==
Stascha Rohmer was born in 1966 in the city of Trier, Germany. His mother was the pedagogue Hildegard Rohmer-Stänner (1948-2022), and his father the architect Erhard Rohmer (1943-2017). Rohmer finished highschool at Beethoven-Gymnasium in the city of Bonn and pursued his higher studies in Philosophy and Hispanic Studies at the Freie Universität Berlin and Technische Universität Berlin. Due to a proposal by Hans Poser and Michael Theunissen, Rohmer was admitted as a member of the renowned scientific organization Studienstiftung. His PHD thesis focused on the Metaphysics of Alfred North Whitehead. His directors during his PHD were Hans Posers and Reiner Wiehl. Between the years of 1999 and 2014, Rohmer investigated and taught at the Institute for Philosophy of Humboldt-Universität Berlin and at the Institute for Philosophy Consejo Superior de Investigaciones Científicas in Madrid.

Rohmer’s research has been supported by many recognized scientific organizations such as the German Academic Exchange Service, the Deutschen Forschungsgemeinschaft, the Meyer-Struckmann Foundation, and the Fritz Thyssen Foundation.

Between 2008 and 2010, Rohmer was holder of an Intra-European Fellowship in the Program Marie Skłodowska-Curie Actions of the European Union. Rohmer wrote various monographs which parts especially from the philosophy of Hegel, Ortega y Gasset, Alfred North Whitehead and Helmuth Plessner.

He also translated the Spanish Philosopher Ortega y Gasset and the English Philosopher Alfred North Whitehead in German and edited their work in the publishing companies Suhrkamp Verlag and Karl Alber. His book Love - Future of an Emotion, (original title: Liebe - Zukunft einer Emotion) was translated in Spanish and was edited in Herder publishing house, Barcelona. It was presented in the channel, TVE2 in Spain.

In 2015 he becomes a full-time Professor of Philosophy of Law at the Faculty of Law in the Universidad de Medellín in Medellín, Colombia. In 2016 he becomes the director of the Philosophy of Law program. One of the main goals of his research is to establish a bridging between Environmental philosophy, Philosophy of Law and Environmental law. He was the director of the first international congress Protection of Biodiversity as a Philosophical and Legal Problem, which took place at Universidad de Medellín between the 16th to the 18th of March in 2017. He was also the director of the congress Somos Memoria. La Escuela de Madrid y El Exilio Español del 39 at Instituto Cervantes in Berlin (2013). In collaboration with Volker Gerhardt, he directed the congress Nature, Technique, Culture at the Humboldt-Universität zu Berlin (2008). Since 2008, Rohmer has been a permanent member of the Whitehead Research Project (WRP) in the (United States), directed by Brian G. Henning. In 2019, he was working as Mercator-Fellow at the Catholic-Theological Faculty of the Ruhr University Bochum, from 2021-23 ha was visiting professorship at the Universidad de Antioquia, Colombia.

== Publications ==
=== Monographs ===
- Rohmer, Stascha, Die Idee des Lebens. Zum Begriff der Grenze bei Hegel und Plessner, Freiburg/Munich: Karl Alber 2016. ISBN 978-3-495-48768-6
- Rohmer, Stascha, Amor.El porvenir de una emoción (Originaltitel: Liebe - Zukunft einer Emotion), translated from German into Spanish by Ana María Rabe and Gabriel Menéndez Torrellas, Barcelona: Herder 2013. ISBN 978-84-254-2667-4.
- Rohmer, Stascha, Liebe – Zukunft einer Emotion, Freiburg/Munich: Karl Alber 2008. ISBN 978-3-495-48317-6
- Rohmer, Stascha, Whiteheads Synthese von Kreativität und Rationalität, Reflexion und Transformation in Alfred North Whiteheads Philosophie der Natur, Freiburg/Munich: Karl Alber 2000. ISBN 978-3-495-48022-9

=== Editions and Translations (selection) ===
- Rohmer, Stascha; Toepfer, Georg, Anthropozän – Klimawandel – Biodiversität: Transdisziplinäre Perspektiven auf das gewandelte Verhältnis von Mensch und Natur, Freiburg/München: Karl Alber 07/2021. ISBN 978-3-495-49041-9.
- Rohmer, Stascha; Rabe, Ana María, Homo Naturalis. Zur Stellung des Menschen innerhalb der Natur, Freiburg/Munich: Karl Alber 2012. ISBN 978-3-495-48471-5
- Ortega y Gasset, José, Der Mensch ist eine Fremder. Schriften zur Metaphysik und Lebensphilosophie, translated from Spanish into German by Stascha Rohmer (ed.), Freiburg/Munich: Karl Alber 2008. ISBN 978-3-495-48104-2
- Whitehead, Alfred North, Denkweisen (Originaltitel:Modes of Thought), translated from English into German by Stascha Rohmer (ed.), Frankfurt on the main: Suhrkamp 2001. ISBN 978-3-518-29132-0

=== Articles (selection) ===
- ¿Existen maquinas vivientes? Sobre la relación entre vida y técnica in: Isegoria. Revista de Filosofía moral y política, Nr. 55, pp. 595–614.
- The Self-Evidence of Civilization, in: Roland Faber, G. Brian Henning, Clinton Combs (Hg.), “Beyond Metaphysics? Explorations in Alfred North Whitehead’s Late Thought”, book series Contemporary Whitehead Studies, New York: Rodopi Publishing House 2010, chap. 13, pp. 215–225.ISBN 978-90-420-3121-0 E-ISBN 978-90-420-3122-7
- Einführung in Ortega y Gassets Lebensphilosophie, in: José Ortega y Gasset, Der Mensch ist ein Fremder, Schriften zur Metaphysik und Lebensphilosophie, Freiburg/Munich: Karl Alber 2008, pp. 7–26. ISBN 9783495481042
