= Thornton Wilder =

American playwright and novelist (1897–1975)

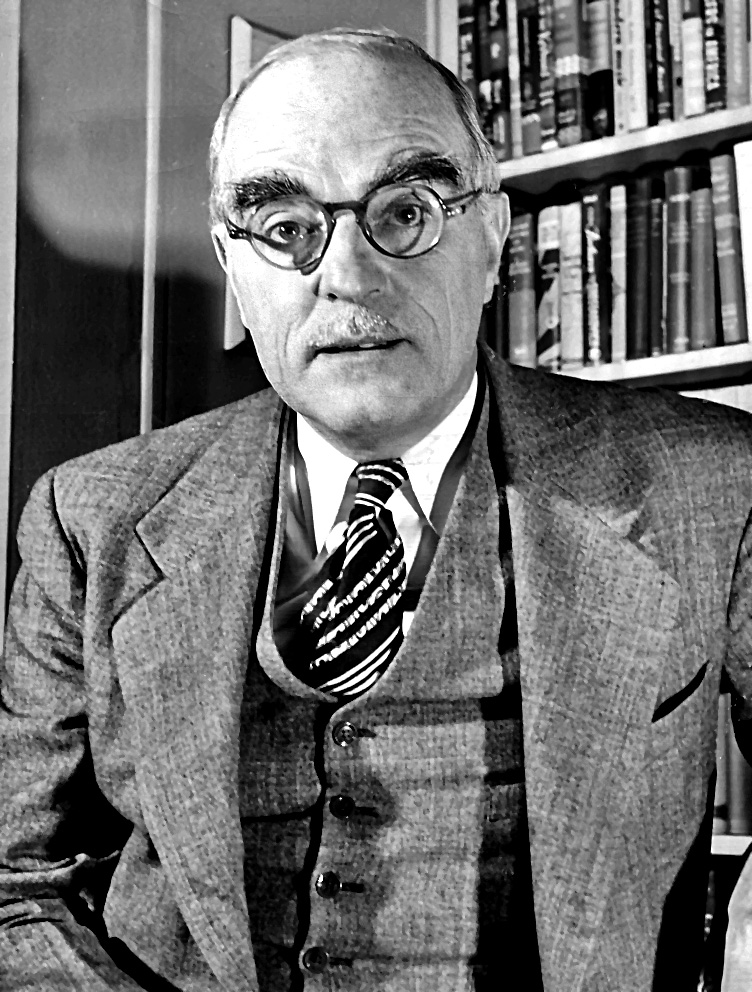
- Wilder in 1948
- Born: Thornton Niven Wilder; April 17, 1897; Madison, Wisconsin, U.S.
- Died: December 7, 1975 (aged 78); Hamden, Connecticut, U.S.
- Education: Oberlin College; Yale University (BA); Princeton University (MA)
- Occupations: Playwright; novelist
- Relatives: Thornton M. Niven, Amos Niven Wilder, Isabel Wilder, Charlotte Wilder, Janet Wilder Dakin
- Writing career
- Notable works: The Bridge of San Luis Rey (1927); Our Town (1938); The Skin of Our Teeth (1942)
- Notable awards: Pulitzer Prize for the Novel (1928); Pulitzer Prize for Drama (1938, 1943); Edward MacDowell Medal (1960); National Book Award for Fiction (1968)

Thornton Niven Wilder (April 17, 1897 – December 7, 1975) was an American playwright and novelist. He won three Pulitzer Prizes, for the novel The Bridge of San Luis Rey and for the plays Our Town and The Skin of Our Teeth, and a U.S. National Book Award for the novel The Eighth Day.

== Early life and education ==
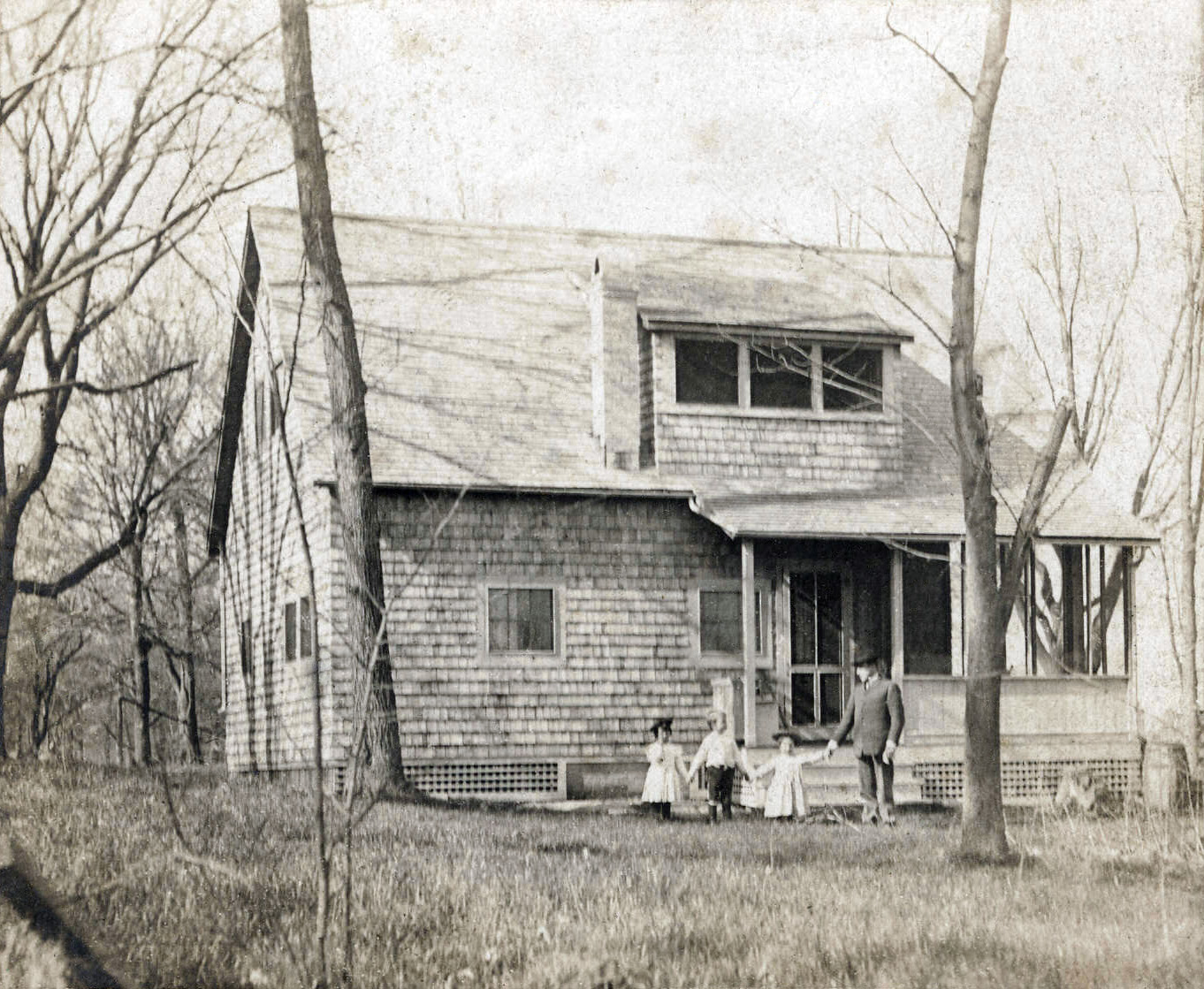
Wilder with two of his siblings and their father Amos at the family cottage in Maple Bluff, Wisconsin in 1900

Wilder was born in Madison, Wisconsin, the son of Amos Parker Wilder, a newspaper editor and later a U.S. diplomat, and Isabella Thornton Niven.

Wilder had four siblings as well as a twin who was stillborn. All of the surviving Wilder children spent part of their childhood in China when their father was stationed in Hong Kong and Shanghai as U.S. Consul General. Thornton's older brother, Amos Niven Wilder, became Hollis Professor of Divinity at the Harvard Divinity School. He was a noted poet and was instrumental in developing the field of theopoetics. Their sister Isabel Wilder was an accomplished writer. They had two more sisters, Charlotte Wilder, a poet, and Janet Wilder Dakin, a zoologist.

== Education ==
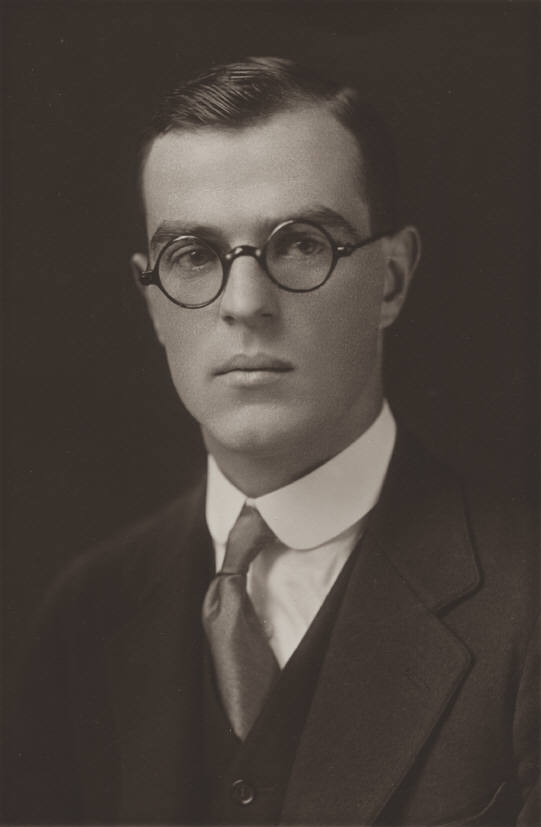
Wilder in his 1920 Yale College graduation photo

Wilder began writing plays while at the Thacher School in Ojai, California, where he did not fit in and was teased by classmates as overly intellectual. According to a classmate, "We left him alone, just left him alone. And he would retire at the library, his hideaway, learning to distance himself from humiliation and indifference." His family lived for a time in China, where his sister Janet was born in 1910. He attended the English China Inland Mission Chefoo School at Yantai, but returned with his mother and siblings to California in 1912 because of the unstable political conditions in China at the time. Thornton graduated from Berkeley High School in 1915.

Wilder served a three-month enlistment in the U.S. Army's Coast Artillery Corps at Fort Adams in Rhode Island during World War I, eventually rising to the rank of corporal. He attended Oberlin College before earning his Bachelor of Arts degree in 1920 at Yale University, where he refined his writing skills as a member of the Alpha Delta Phi fraternity, a literary society. He earned his Master of Arts degree in French literature from Princeton University in 1926.

== Career ==
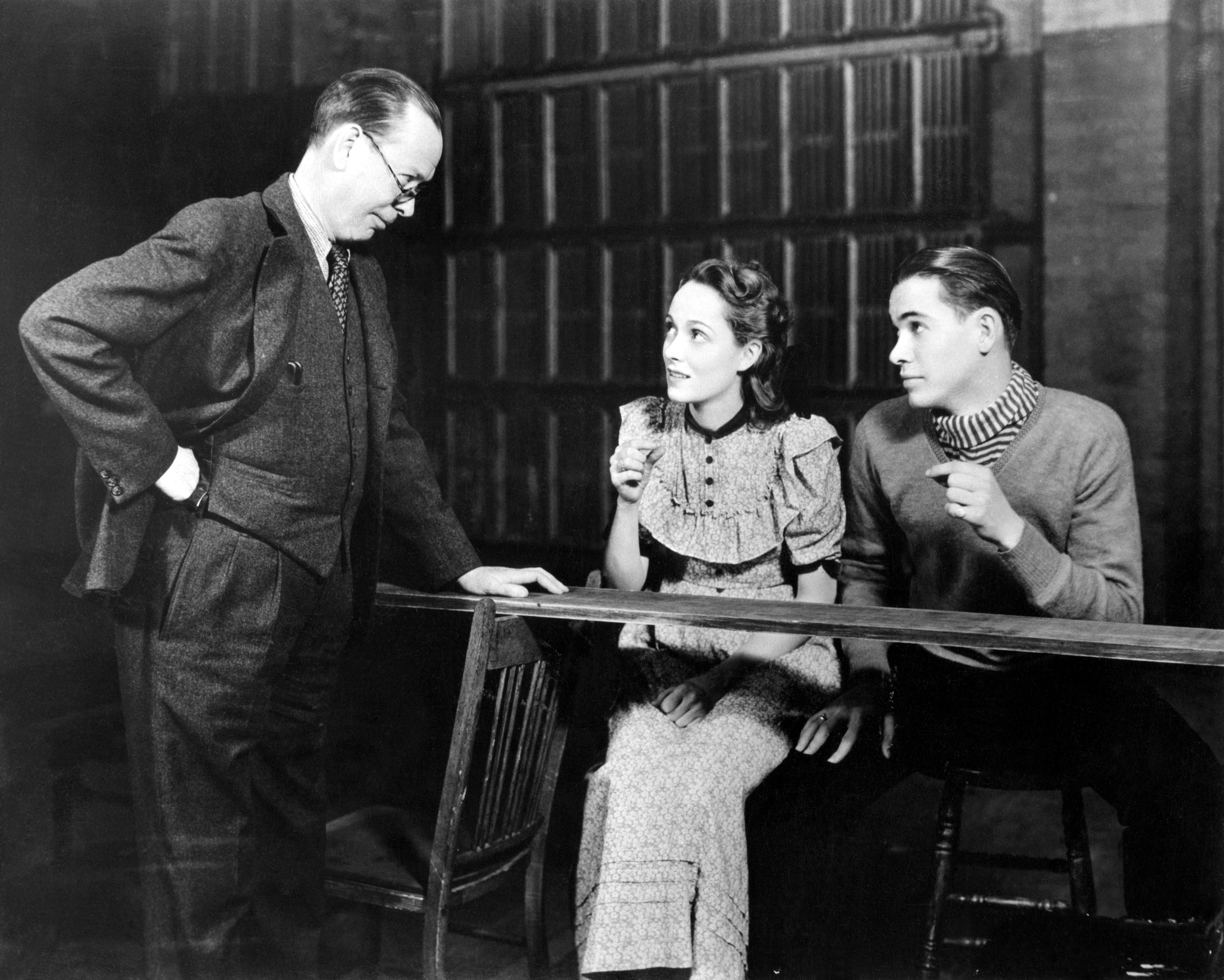
Frank Craven, Martha Scott, and John Craven in the original Broadway production of Our Town, published in 1938, which won the Pulitzer Prize for Drama

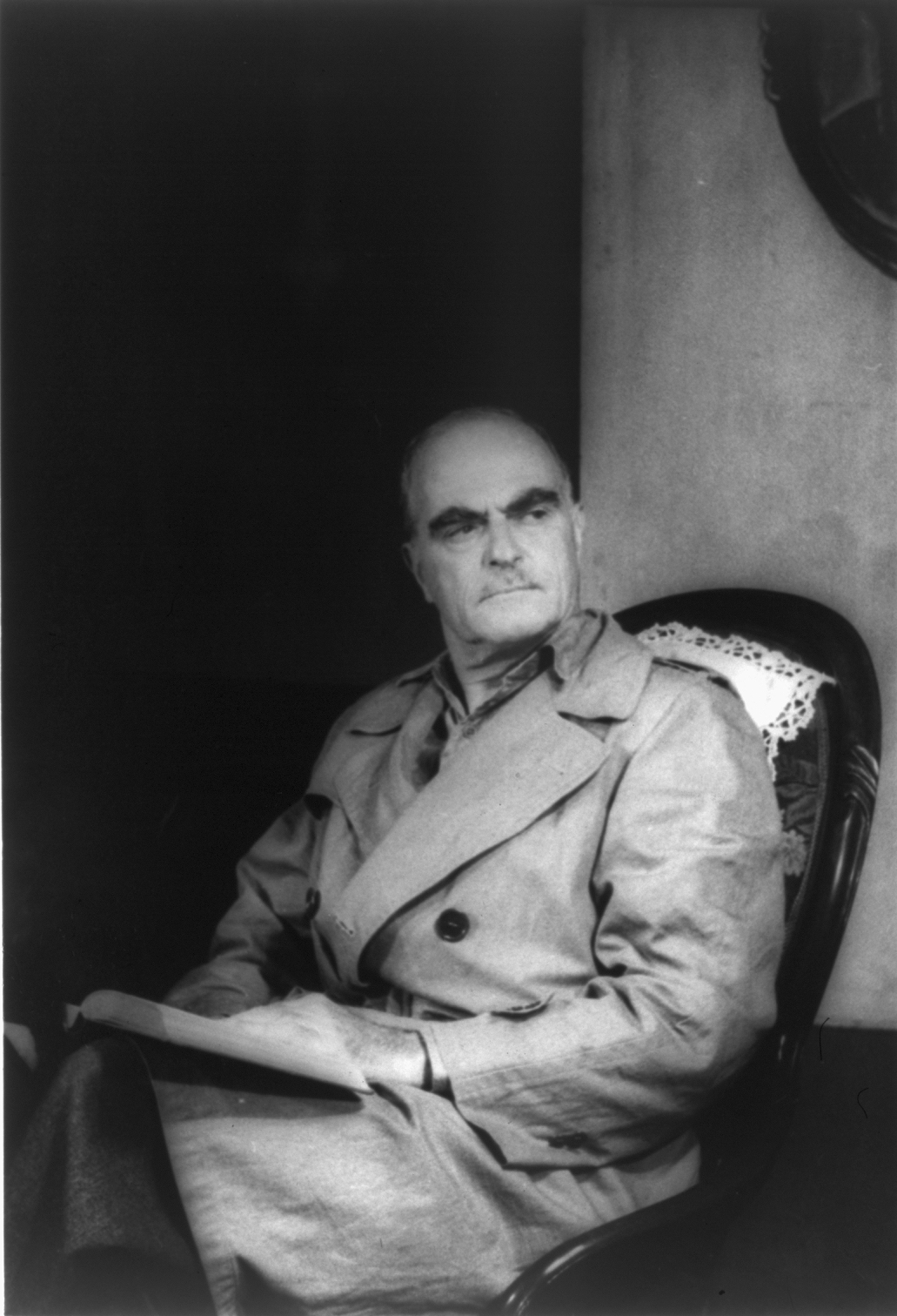
Wilder as Mr. Antrobus in The Skin of Our Teeth in 1948

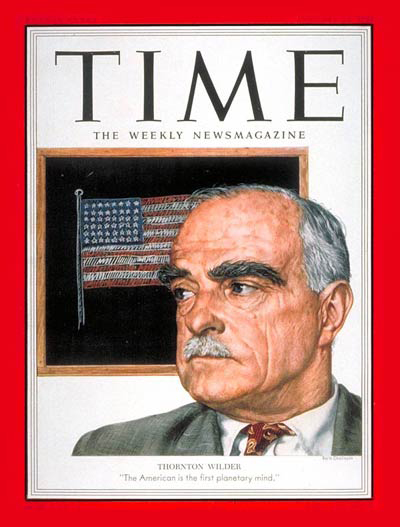
Wilder on the cover of the January 12, 1953 issue of Time magazine

After graduating, Wilder went to Italy and studied archaeology and Italian (1920–21) as part of an eight-month residency at The American Academy in Rome, and then taught French at the Lawrenceville School in Lawrenceville, New Jersey, beginning in 1921. His first novel, The Cabala, was published in 1926. In 1927, The Bridge of San Luis Rey brought him commercial success and his first Pulitzer Prize (1928). He resigned from the Lawrenceville School in 1928. From 1930 to 1937, he taught at the University of Chicago, during which time he translated and adapted André Obey's "Le Viol de Lucrece" (1931) into the play Lucrece which staged on Broadway in 1932. It was published by Longmans Green in 1933. In Chicago, he became famous as a lecturer and was chronicled on the celebrity pages. In 1938, he won the Pulitzer Prize for Drama for his play Our Town, and he won the prize again in 1943 for his play The Skin of Our Teeth.

World War II saw Wilder rise to the rank of lieutenant colonel in the U.S. Army Air Force Intelligence, first in Africa, then in Italy until 1945. He received several awards for his military service. (Note: The American Legion of Merit and Bronze Star, Chevalier of the Legion d'Honneur from France, and an honorary Member of the Order of the British Empire (MBE) from Britain.) He went on to be a visiting professor at Harvard University, where he served for a year as the Charles Eliot Norton professor. Though he considered himself a teacher first and a writer second, he continued to write all his life, receiving the Peace Prize of the German Book Trade in 1957 and the Presidential Medal of Freedom in 1963. In 1968 he won the National Book Award for his novel The Eighth Day.

Proficient in four languages, Wilder translated plays by André Obey and Jean-Paul Sartre. He wrote the libretti of two operas, The Long Christmas Dinner, composed by Paul Hindemith, and The Alcestiad, composed by Louise Talma and based on his own play. Alfred Hitchcock, whom he admired, asked him to write the screenplay of his thriller Shadow of a Doubt, and he completed a first draft for the film.

The Bridge of San Luis Rey (1927) tells the story of several unrelated people who happen to be on a bridge in Peru when it collapses, killing them. Philosophically, the book explores the question of why unfortunate events occur to people who seem "innocent" or "undeserving". It won the Pulitzer Prize in 1928, and in 1998 it was selected by the editorial board of the American Modern Library as one of the 100 best novels of the twentieth century. The book was quoted by British Prime Minister Tony Blair during the memorial service for victims of the September 11 attacks in 2001. Since then its popularity has grown enormously. The book is the progenitor of the modern disaster epic in literature and film-making, where a single disaster intertwines the victims, whose lives are then explored by means of flashbacks to events before the disaster.

Wilder wrote Our Town, a popular play (and later film) set in fictional Grover's Corners, New Hampshire. It was inspired in part by Dante's Purgatorio and in part by his friend Gertrude Stein's novel The Making of Americans. Wilder suffered from writer's block while writing the final act. Our Town employs a choric narrator called the Stage Manager and a minimalist set to underscore the human experience. Wilder himself played the Stage Manager on Broadway for two weeks and later in summer stock productions. Following the daily lives of the Gibbs and Webb families, as well as the other inhabitants of Grover's Corners, the play illustrates the importance of the universality of the simple, yet meaningful lives of all people in the world in order to demonstrate the value of appreciating life. The play won the 1938 Pulitzer Prize.

In 1938, Max Reinhardt directed a Broadway production of The Merchant of Yonkers, which Wilder had adapted from Austrian playwright Johann Nestroy's Einen Jux will er sich machen (1942). It was a failure, closing after 39 performances.

His play The Skin of Our Teeth opened in New York on November 18, 1942, featuring Fredric March and Tallulah Bankhead. Again, the themes are familiar – the timeless human condition; history as progressive, cyclical, or entropic; literature, philosophy, and religion as the touchstones of civilization. Three acts dramatize the travails of the Antrobus family, allegorizing the alternate history of mankind. It was claimed by Joseph Campbell and Henry Morton Robinson, authors of A Skeleton Key to Finnegans Wake, that much of the play was the result of unacknowledged borrowing from James Joyce's last work. (Note: Joseph Campbell and Henry Morton Robinson published a pair of reviews-cum-denunciations entitled "The Skin of Whose Teeth?" in the Saturday Review immediately after the play's debut; these created a huge uproar at the time. Campbell's Mythic Worlds, Modern Words, Novato, California: New World Library, 2004, pp. 257–266, ISBN 978-1-57731-406-6 reprints the reviews and discusses the controversy.)

In his novel The Ides of March (1948), Wilder reconstructed the characters and events leading to, and culminating in, the assassination of Julius Caesar. He had met Jean-Paul Sartre on a U.S. lecture tour after the war, and was under the influence of existentialism, although rejecting its atheist implications.

In 1954, Tyrone Guthrie encouraged Wilder to rework The Merchant of Yonkers into The Matchmaker. This time the play opened in 1955 and enjoyed a healthy Broadway run of 486 performances with Ruth Gordon in the title role, winning a Tony Award for Guthrie, its director. It became the basis for the hit 1964 musical Hello, Dolly!, with a book by Michael Stewart and score by Jerry Herman.

In 1960, Wilder was awarded the first ever Edward MacDowell Medal by The MacDowell Colony for outstanding contributions to American culture.

In 1962 and 1963, Wilder lived for 20 months in the small town of Douglas, Arizona, apart from family and friends. There he started his longest novel, The Eighth Day, which went on to win the National Book Award. According to Harold Augenbraum in 2009, it "attack[ed] the big questions head on, ... [embedded] in the story of small-town America".

His last novel, Theophilus North, was published in 1973, and made into the film Mr. North in 1988.

The Emporium is Thornton Wilder's final, long-unfinished play, later completed by Kirk Lynn from more than 300 pages of archival drafts discovered at Yale. Premiering in 2024 at Alley Theatre in Houston and receiving an Off-Broadway run in 2026, the play follows John, an orphan who arrives in a vast, mysterious department store—the titular Emporium—that seems to contain everything yet offers no clear path to entry or belonging. Blending surreal, Kafka-esque elements with Wilder's signature philosophical tone, the store becomes a metaphor for work, identity, longing, love, and the elusive search for meaning, with the audience often implicated as participants in this symbolic world.

The Library of America republished all of Wilder's plays in 2007, together with some of his writings on the theater and the screenplay of Shadow of a Doubt. In 2009, a second volume was released, containing his first five novels, six early stories, and four essays on fiction. Finally, the third and final volume in the Library of America series on Wilder was released in 2011, containing his last two novels The Eighth Day and Theophilus North, as well as four autobiographical sketches.

== Personal life ==
Six years after Wilder's death, Samuel Steward wrote in his autobiography that he had sexual relations with him. In 1937, Gertrude Stein had given Steward, then a college professor, a letter of introduction to Wilder. According to Steward, Alice B. Toklas told him that Wilder liked him and that Wilder had reported he was having trouble starting the third act of Our Town until he and Steward walked around Zürich all night in the rain and the next day wrote the whole act, opening with a crowd in a rainy cemetery. Penelope Niven disputes Steward's claim of a relationship with Wilder and, based on Wilder's correspondence, says Wilder worked on the third act of Our Town over the course of several months and completed it several months before he first met Steward. Robert Gottlieb, reviewing Penelope Niven's work in The New Yorker in 2013, claimed Wilder had become infatuated with a man, not identified by Gottlieb, and Wilder's feelings were not reciprocated. Gottlieb asserted that "Niven ties herself in knots in her discussion of Wilder's confusing sexuality" and that "His interest in women was unshakably nonsexual." He takes Steward's view that Wilder was a latent homosexual but never comfortable with sex.

Wilder had a wide circle of friends, including writers Ernest Hemingway, F. Scott Fitzgerald, Zelda Fitzgerald, Toklas, Jean-Paul Sartre, and Stein; actress Ruth Gordon; fighter Gene Tunney; and socialite Sibyl, Lady Colefax.

From the earnings of The Bridge of San Luis Rey, in 1930 Wilder had a house built for his family in Hamden, Connecticut, designed by Alice Trythall Washburn, one of the few female architects working at the time. His sister Isabel lived there for the rest of her life. This became his home base, although he traveled extensively and lived away for significant periods.

== Death ==
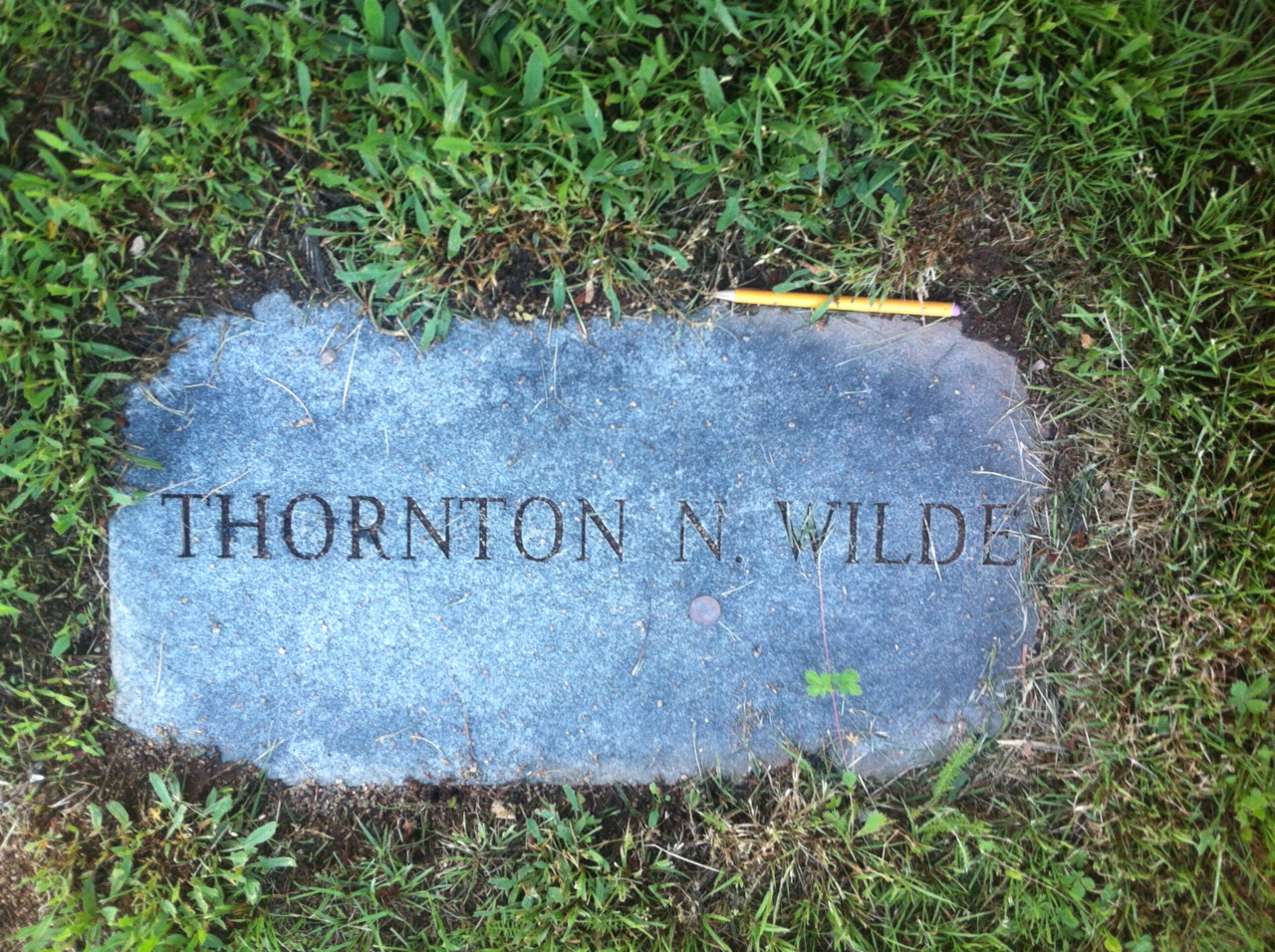
Thorton N Wilder's gravestone, Hamden, Connecticut

Wilder died of heart failure in his Hamden, Connecticut, house on December 7, 1975, at age 78. He is interred at Mount Carmel Cemetery in Hamden.

== Works ==
=== Plays ===
- The Trumpet Shall Sound (1926)
- The Angel That Troubled the Waters and Other Plays (1928):
  - "Nascuntur Poetae"
  - "Proserpina and the Devil"
  - "Fanny Otcott"
  - "Brother Fire"
  - "The Penny That Beauty Spent"
  - "The Angel on the Ship"
  - "The Message and Jehanne"
  - "Childe Roland to the Dark Tower Came"
  - "Centaurs"
  - "Leviathan"
  - "And the Sea Shall Give Up Its Dead"
  - "The Servant's Name Was Malchus"
  - "Mozart and the Gray Steward"
  - "Hast Thou Considered My Servant Job?"
  - "The Flight Into Egypt"
  - "The Angel That Troubled the Waters"
- The Long Christmas Dinner and Other Plays in One Act (1931):
  - The Long Christmas Dinner
  - Queens of France
  - Pullman Car Hiawatha
  - Love and How to Cure It
  - Such Things Only Happen in Books
  - The Happy Journey to Trenton and Camden
- Lucrece (1932)
- Our Town (1938)—won the Pulitzer Prize for Drama
- The Merchant of Yonkers (1938)
- The Skin of Our Teeth (1942)—won the Pulitzer Prize
- The Matchmaker (1954)—revised from The Merchant of Yonkers
- The Alcestiad: Or, a Life in the Sun (1955)
- Childhood (1960)
- Infancy (1960)
- Plays for Bleecker Street (1962)
- The Collected Short Plays of Thornton Wilder Volume I (1997):
  - The Long Christmas Dinner
  - Queens of France
  - Pullman Car Hiawatha
  - Love and How to Cure It
  - Such Things Only Happen in Books
  - The Happy Journey to Trenton and Camden
  - The Drunken Sisters
  - Bernice
  - The Wreck on the Five-Twenty-Five
  - A Ringing of Doorbells
  - In Shakespeare and the Bible
  - Someone from Assisi
  - Cement Hands
  - Infancy
  - Childhood
  - Youth
  - The Rivers Under the Earth
  - Our Town
- The Emporium (2024)

=== Novels ===
- The Cabala (1926)
- The Bridge of San Luis Rey (1927)—won the Pulitzer Prize for the Novel
- The Woman of Andros (1930)—based on Andria, a comedy by Terence
- Heaven's My Destination (1935)
- Ides of March (1948)
- The Eighth Day (1967)—won the National Book Award for Fiction
- Theophilus North (1973)—reprinted as Mr. North following the appearance of the film of the same name

=== Collections ===
- Wilder, Thornton (2007). McClatchy, J. D. (ed.). Thornton Wilder, Collected Plays and Writings on Theater. Library of America. Vol. 172. New York: Library of America. ISBN 978-1-59853-003-2.
- Wilder, Thornton (2009). McClatchy, J. D. (ed.). Thornton Wilder, The Bridge of San Luis Rey and Other Novels 1926–1948. Library of America. Vol. 194. New York: Library of America. ISBN 978-1-59853-045-2.
- Wilder, Thornton (2011). McClatchy, J. D. (ed.). Thornton Wilder, The Eighth Day, Theophilus North, Autobiographical Writings. Library of America. Vol. 222. New York: Library of America. ISBN 978-1-59853-146-6.

=== Films ===
- Shadow of a Doubt (1943) - co-written by Wilder with Sally Benson and Alma Reville

== Notes ==
Non-profit organization positions
| Preceded by François Mauriac | Wartime International Presidential Committee 1941–47 PEN International; 1941–1947 | Succeeded by Hu Shih |
