= Trythall =

Trythall is a surname. Notable people with the surname include:

- Gil Trythall (1930–2023), American composer, electronic music pioneer, keyboardist and pianist
- Richard Aaker Trythall (1939–2022), American-born Italian composer and pianist, brother of Gil

== See also ==
- Alice Trythall Washburn (1870–1958), an American self-taught architect
