= Isabel Wilder =

American novelist, biographer and patron of the arts

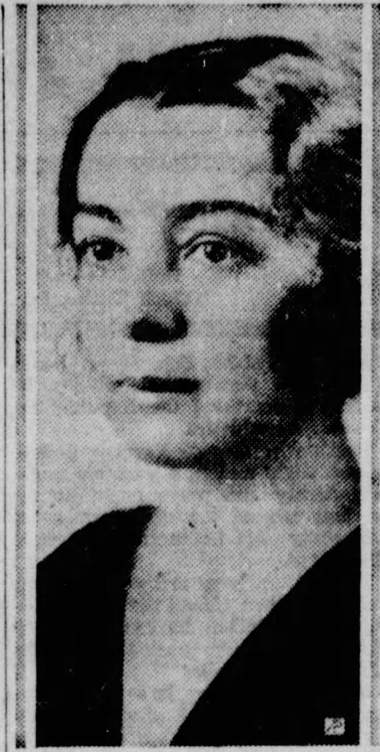
Isabel Wilder

Isabel Wilder (January 13, 1900 in Madison, Wisconsin – February 27, 1995 in Hamden, Connecticut) was an American novelist, biographer and patron of the arts. She was the sister of playwright Thornton Wilder, for whom she was literary agent, spokesperson and biographer.

== Biography ==
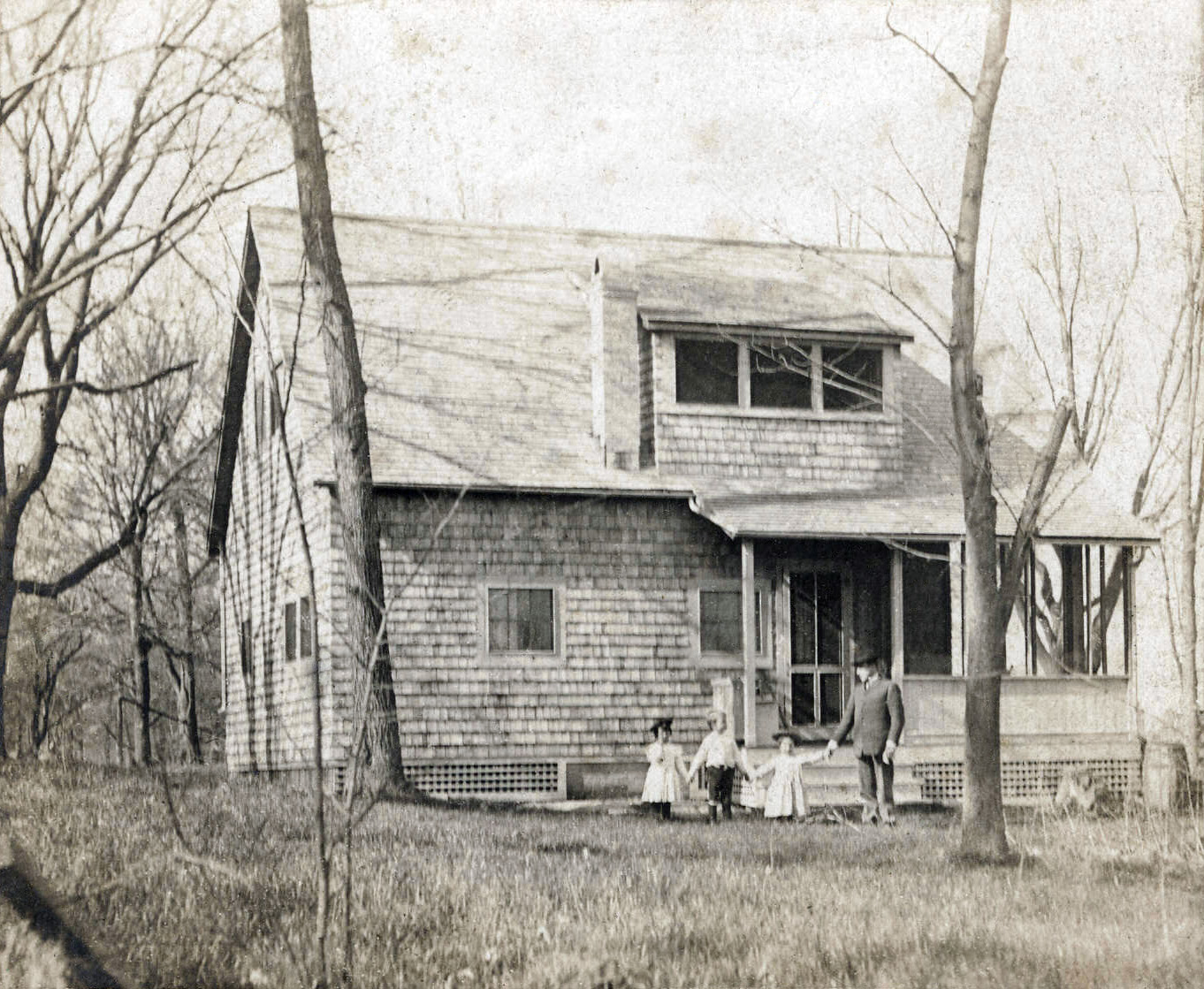
Isabel's father, Amos, with her brother Thornton, sister Charlotte and, possibly, Isabel at the family cottage in Maple Bluff, Wisconsin (1900)

Isabel Wilder was the daughter of Isabella and Amos Parker Wilder, publisher of the Wisconsin State Journal. Her father's support for Theodore Roosevelt's presidential campaign earned him a diplomatic appointment and led the family to Hong Kong in 1906, then to Shanghai in 1909. Her father served as US Consul General in both cities. Her siblings included the poet and theologian Amos (1895–1993), the playwright and novelist Thornton (1897–1975), the poet Charlotte (1898–1980) and the zoologist Janet Wilder Dakin.

Isabel Wilder's childhood and studies were quite upset by the family's successive moves, leaving for China in 1906, returning to the United States in 1912 to Berkeley, California, then in 1915 moving to Hamden, Connecticut. In 1924, however, she began studying dramatic arts at Yale University, from which she graduated in 1928. She was part of the first class of the Yale School of Drama, which was then called the "Department of Drama".

During and after her studies, she attended a thriving Thornton, who in 1928 had received his first Pulitzer Prize for the novel "The Bridge of San Luis Rey". She was responsible, for example, for the edition of "Long Christmas dinner, and other plays" in 1931. At the same time, she published her own novels, "Mother and Four" (1933), "Heart Be Still" (1934) and "Let Winter Go" (1937). Nevertheless, she continued her work with her brother Thornton, contributing in various ways to his works. After the death of the latter, in 1977, she took care of the publication of his unpublished works, like the opera "The Alcestiad" (1977) and "American Characteristics and Other Essays" (1979), and in 1985 she wrote the preface to "The Journals of Thornton Wilder 1939–1961". In 1978, in memory of her brother, Isabel Wilder founded the "Thornton Niven Wilder Prize", a prize for translation of foreign literary works awarded annually by Columbia University. Isabel Wilder died on February 27, 1995, at the family home in Hamden. The last survivor of the Wilder family, she rests with them at Hamden's Mount Carmel Cemetery.

== Publications (selection) ==
- Mother and Four, New York, Coward, McCann, 1933.
- Heart, Be Still, New York, Coward, McCann, Inc., 1934.
- Let Winter Go, New York, Coward-McCann, Inc., 1937.
