= Janet Wilder Dakin =

American zoologist and conservationist

- Born: Janet Frances Wilder; June 3, 1910; Berkeley, California
- Died: October 7, 1994 (aged 84); Amherst, Massachusetts
- Education: Mount Holyoke College, University of Chicago
- Occupations: Philanthropist; Zoologist
- Spouse: Winthrop S. Dakin
- Parents: Amos Parker Wilder (father); Isabella Niven Wilder (mother)

Janet Wilder Dakin (June 3, 1910 – October 7, 1994), was an American philanthropist and zoologist, known for her animal advocacy and environmental work.

== Biography ==
Janet Frances Wilder was born in China, the daughter of Isabella Niven and Amos Parker Wilder. She was the youngest of several siblings who would become well known in adulthood: theologist and poet Amos Niven Wilder, author Thornton Wilder, poet Charlotte Wilder and writer Isabel Wilder.

In 1906, her father was appointed the United States Consul General in Hong Kong and in 1909, he was assigned to a similar position in Shanghai, where he served until 1914. Janet lived with her family in China for a few years, but when the country became unstable, they returned to the United States, where they lived in Berkeley, California.

She graduated from high school in New Haven, Connecticut. In college, she received her B.A. in zoology, magna cum laude, Phi Beta Kappa in 1933, and her M.A. in biology in 1935, both from Mount Holyoke College in Massachusetts. She received her Ph.D. in zoology from the University of Chicago in 1939 and taught zoology at Mount Holyoke until 1941 when she married Winthrop S. Dakin. Known as Toby, he was a lawyer and later one of the first trustees of Hampshire College in Amherst, Massachusetts.

Between 1936 and 1940, Dakin authored several published papers reflecting her studies of insect life. In the 1950s she wrote a series of articles for Morgan Horse Magazine in which she described her experiences raising a Morgan horse. These articles were published in 1990 as a book called "Jeffy's Journal." Dakin raised and rode horses and served on the Mount Holyoke College Equestrian Center Steering Committee from 1983 to 1986, which was intent on creating an equestrian center at Mount Holyoke College.

While volunteering with the League of Women Voters, Dakin began studying the use of the parliamentary process by organizations and earned her certification as a Professional Parliamentarian from the American Institute of Parliamentarians. With those skills, she was named parliamentarian for conventions of the League of Women Voters and for the Alumnae Association of Mount Holyoke College.

=== Conservation efforts ===
Janet Dakin consistently promoted state and federal legislative action intended to preserve open lands for wildlife, and make it available to the public for recreational and educational purposes. She was the first chairperson of the Blue Start Highway, a beautification project for Route 1 in Massachusetts.

As a charter member of the Amherst Conservation Commission from 1962 to 1974, she helped lead efforts to preserve the lands in the Holyoke Range.

In 1970, Dakin founded and served as executive director of the Kestrel Trust, a private land trust that acquired land in neighboring communities for conservation purposes as a part of the Conservation Commission.

In 1979 she raised $250,000 from private funds for the Equine Center Project at the University of Massachusetts, and she later donated her Amherst home and the surrounding land to the same university. It is now known as the Renaissance Center.

Dakin was a longtime animal advocate. She become the founding member and first president of The Friends of Amherst's Stray Animals (FASA), later renamed the Dakin Animal Shelter, and which went on to become the Dakin Humane Society, the largest animal shelter and resource center in western Massachusetts. She also led state-wide efforts to protect animals from laboratory cruelty. As a result of her work, hundreds of thousands of pets were rescued and adopted, and more than 85,000 were spayed or neutered at the Dakin Community Clinic.

Her papers and photographs are preserved at Mount Holyoke College.

=== Last years ===
During her lifetime, Dakin became known as "The First Lady of Amherst." She died of lung cancer on October 7, 1994, in Amherst, at 84 years of age.

== Selected awards ==
- Volunteer Achievement Award from the Mount Holyoke Alumnae Association in 1975
- Conservation Award from The Trustees of Reservations in 1978
