= Theophilus North =

1973 novel by Thornton Wilder

- Author: Thornton Wilder
- Language: English
- Genre: Novel
- Publisher: Harper & Row
- Publication date: 1973
- Publication place: United States
- Media type: Print (Hardcover)
- Pages: 374
- ISBN: 978-0-060-14636-8

Theophilus North is a 1973 autobiographical novel, the last novel written by Thornton Wilder. In 1988 it was adapted for the film Mr. North.

== Plot summary ==
In 1926 Theophilus North, 29 years old, leaves his four years employment at a New Jersey school and goes to Newport, Rhode Island, to buy a car that a friend sold him. He has no idea what to do next in his life. Arriving in the city, he decides to remain there. He tries to get an income giving private lessons and as a reader for $2.00 per hour, but soon his ability in solving problems helps introduce him to Newport's high society.

== Characters ==
- Theophilus North
- Josiah Dexter
- Bill Wentworth
- Henry Simmons
- Mrs. Cranston
- Diana Bell and Hilary Jones
- Miss Wickoff
- Mr. Diefendorf
- Flora Deland
- Baron Egon Bodo von Stams

== Style ==
The novel is written in the first person; the fictional author declares it is an abstract of a journal. A great part of the novel is made of dialogues between North and other characters. There are fifteen chapters, each one treating a different episode where North is involved.
