= Rubem Alves =

Brazilian theologian, philosopher, and psychoanalyst

Rubem Azevedo Alves
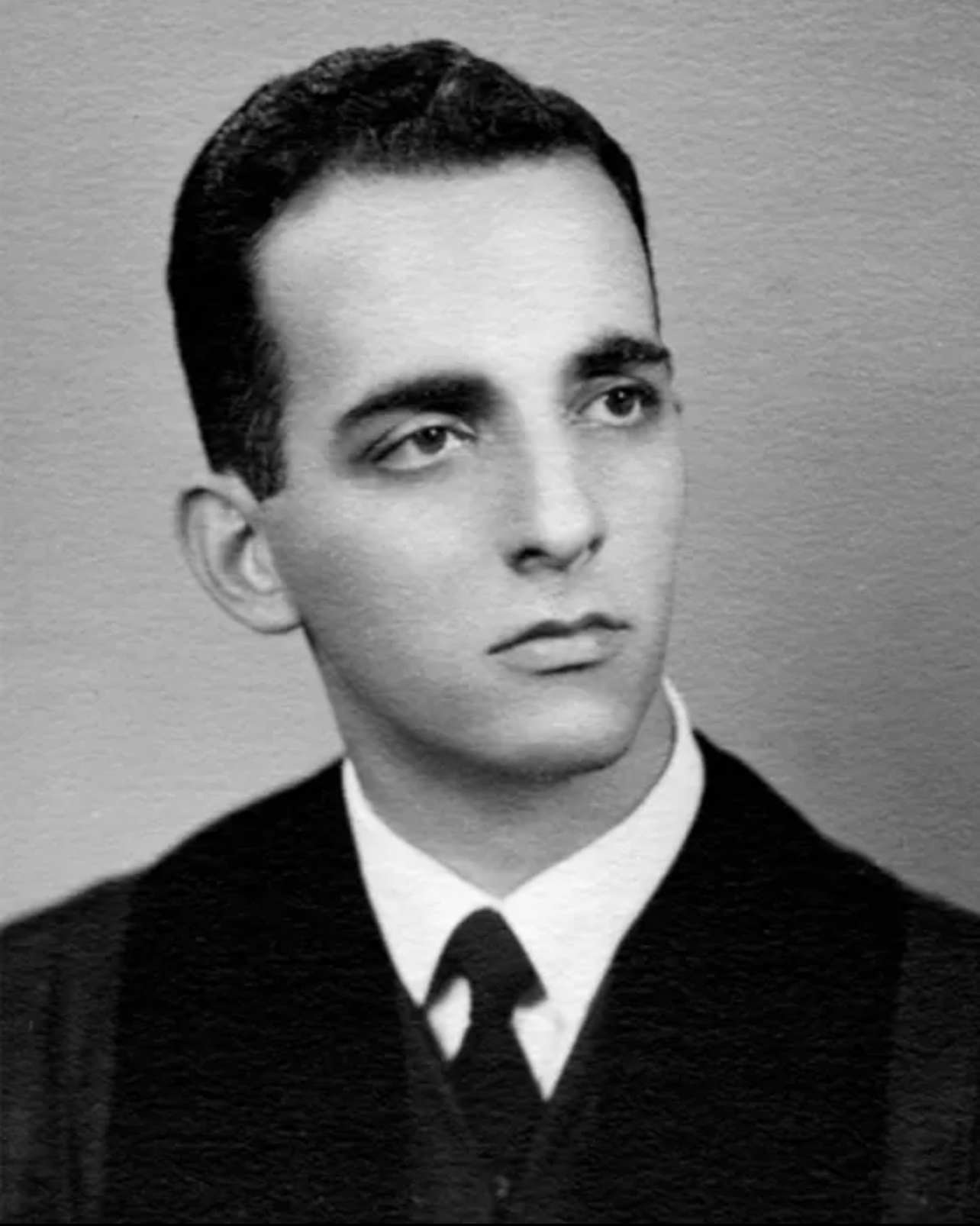
- Alves in 1957
- Born: 15 September 1933; Boa Esperança, Minas Gerais, Brazil
- Died: 19 July 2014 (aged 80); Campinas, São Paulo, Brazil
- Writing career
- Language: English, Portuguese

Rubem Azevedo Alves (15 September 1933 – 19 July 2014) was a Brazilian Presbyterian theologian, philosopher, educator, writer and psychoanalyst. Alves was one of the founders of Latin American liberation theology.

== Life ==
Alves was born on 15 September 1933, in Boa Esperança, Minas Gerais, Brazil. He obtained his Bachelor of Theology (BTh) degree at the Presbyterian Seminary in Campinas, Brazil, in 1957. He went on to obtain a Master of Theology (ThM) from the Union Theological Seminary in New York City, United States, in 1964. After completing this degree, Alves returned to Brazil amidst a US-sponsored military coup against the democratically elected Brazilian government. At the time, the new military regime was attempting to purge Brazil of communist sympathizers. The Presbyterian Church of Brazil provided the new government with the names of six intellectuals to serve as scapegoats and to avert persecution themselves. Immediately upon his return to Brazil, Alves went into hiding. More than forty accusations were made against Alves and others, including claims that they taught that Jesus was sexually involved with a prostitute, celebrated when their children denounced Americans, and were funded by the Soviet Union. Alves reports that these accusations were ineffective, saying, "the positive side of the document was that it was so virulent, that not even the most obtuse could believe that we were guilty of so many crimes." Alves continued to elude government authorities. Within two months of his arrival in Brazil, he returned to the United States covertly with assistance from Brazilian Freemasons and the Presbyterian Church in the United States, which secured an invitation from Princeton Theological Seminary for him to commence doctoral studies there.

Alves did not enjoy his studies at Princeton. He sorely missed his homeland, and felt constrained by the requirements of the doctoral program. Although he ultimately wrote his dissertation according to the requirements of his professors, Alves was not pleased with it, saying, "I wrote uglily, without smiles or poetry, for there was no other alternative: a Brazilian student, underdeveloped, in a foreign institution, must indeed submit himself, if he wants to pass." He completed his doctoral dissertation, Toward a Theology of Liberation, in 1968, and received "the lowest possible grade" needed to receive his doctorate (PhD) at Princeton in 1968.

Alves later critiqued the direction some writers took Latin American liberation theology, saying "it has little to say about the personal dimension of life. If a father or mother comes with their dead child, it's no consolation to say, 'In the future just society there will be no more deaths of this kind.' This brings no comfort!" He also described liberation theology as "absolutely essential", describing his own version of liberation theology with these words: "The origin of my liberation theology is an erotic exuberance for life. We need to struggle to restore its erotic exuberance, to share this with the whole world."

== Academic career ==
1. Trained as a psychoanalyst through the Brazilian Association of Psychoanalysis of São Paulo.
2. Assistant Professor of Social Philosophy, Faculty of Philosophy, Sciences and Letters of Rio Claro (1969).
3. Assistant Professor of Philosophy, State University of Campinas (UNICAMP) (1974). He was promoted to professor (1979) and associate professor (1980), both at the Faculty of Education, UNICAMP.

== Career as writer ==
Besides his activities as a university professor and researcher, Alves was a prolific writer of books and articles in journals and newspapers on education, psychology and life in general. From 1986 he was a regular columnist in Correio Popular, the main newspaper in his hometown, Campinas, in São Paulo state. He published more than 40 books, several of which have been translated into German, French, English, Italian, Spanish and Romanian.

During his career he collaborated with notable personalities, including Peter Maurin, Dorothy Day, and Paulo Freire.

His book, The Poet, The Warrior, The Prophet, is an important text in the field of theopoetics.

During the last years of his life, Alves wrote several children's books. Alves died on 19 July 2014, in Campinas, Brazil.

== Legacy ==
Alves has been described as an "unsung hero", and is often omitted from brief descriptions of liberation theology.

== Books ==
=== International ===
- —. A Theological Interpretation of the Meaning of the Revolution in Brasil (Th.M.). Union Theological Seminary.
- —. A Theology of Human Hope. Washington: Corpus Books. 246 pages. Revised version of his doctorate thesis, originally titled Towards a Theology of Liberation.
- —. Tomorrow's Child. Imagination, Creativity and the Rebirth of Culture. New York: Harper and Row.
- —. What is Religion?. Orbis Books: New York.
- —. I believe in the Resurrection of the Body. Philadelphia: Fortress Press.
- —. Teologia della Speranza umana. Brescia: Queriniana Editrice. 246 pages.
- —. Christianisme, Opium o Liberation? Une Theologie de L'Espoir Humain. Paris.
- —. Il Figlio del Domani. Brescia: Queriniana Editrice. 207 pages.
- —. Hijos DeI Mañana. Salamanca: Edições Sígueme. 231 pages.
- —. El Enigma de la Religion. Translated by Lopez, Raúl. Buenos Aires: Edições la Aurora. 269 pages.
- —. L'Enigma della Religione. Roma: Edizione Borla. 192 pages.
- —. Was ist Religion?. Zürich: Pendo-Verlag.
- —. Protestantism and Repression: A Brazilian case study. New York: Orbis Books / SCM Press. 215 pages.
- —. Ich glaube an die Auferstehung des Leibes: Meditationen. Düsseldorf: Patmos Verlang. 79 pages.
- —. Je Crois en la Résurrection du Corps: Méditation. Paris: Lês Édition du Cerf. 85 pages.
- —. La Teologia como Juego. Buenos Aires: Ediciones la Aurora. 143 pages.
- —. Vater Unser. Mediationen. Düsseldorf: Translated by Horst Goldstein. 144 pages.
- —. The Poet, the Warrior, the Prophet. London: SCM Press / Trinity Press International. 148 pages.
- —. Le Mangeur de Paroles. Paris: Les Éditions du Cerf. 203 pages.
- —. Parole da Mangiare. Comunitá di Bose. Magnano, Italy: Edizione Qiqajon. 199 pages.
- —. Cartea cuvintelor bune de mâncat sau bucătăria ca parabolă teologică. Sibiu: Editura Deisis. 191 pages.
- —. La Alegria de Enseñar. Barcelona: Ediciones Octaedro. 95 pages.
- — (9 October 2016). The Best Chronicles of Rubem Alves. Hanover, CT: New London Librarium. ISBN 978-0996674782. 182 pages. (translation of As Melhores Crônicas de Rubem Alves)
- — (7 February 2017). Tender Returns. Hanover, CT: New London Librarium. ISBN 978-0998273068. 212 pages. (translation of Retorno e Terno)
- — (5 December 2019). Concert for Body and Soul. Hanover, CT: New London Librarium. ISBN 978-1947074408. 205 pages. (translation of Concerto para Corpo e Alma)

=== In Portuguese ===
- — (2002). Escola com que sempre sonhei sem imaginar que pudesse existir. Campinas: Editora Papirus. 120 pages.
- —. A Gestação do Futuro. Campinas: Editora Papirus. 199 pages.
- —. O Enigma da Religião. Petrópolis: Editora Vozes. 169 pages.
- —. Filosofia da Ciência: Introdução ao jogo e suas regras. São Paulo: Editora Brasiliense. 190 pages.
- —. O que é Religião?. São Paulo: Brasiliense/Abril Cultural. 133 pages.
- —. Protestantismo e Repressão. São Paulo: Editora Ática. 290 pages.
- —. Dogmatismo e Tolerância. São Paulo: Paulus. 172 pages.
- —. Creio na Ressurreição do corpo: Meditações. Rio de Janeiro: CEDI. 73 pages.
- —. Variações sobre a Vida e Morte: A Teologia e sua Fala. São Paulo: Paulus. 213 pages.
- —. Gandhi. São Paulo: Editora Brasiliense. 119 pages.
- —. Poesia, Profecia e Magia. Rio de Janeiro: CEDI. 80 pages.
- —. Conversas Com Quem Gosta de Ensinar. São Paulo: Cortez/Autores Associados. 87 pages.
- —. Estórias de Quem Gosta de Ensinar. São Paulo: Cortez/Autores Associados. 108 pages.
- —. O Suspiro dos Oprimidos. São Paulo: Paulus. 119 pages.
- —. Pai Nosso. São Paulo: Paulus. 146 pages.
- —. Tempus Fugit. São Paulo: Paulus. 109 pages.
- —. O Poeta, o Guerreiro e o Profeta. Petrópolis: Editora Vozes. 143 pages.
- —. Lições de Feitiçaria. Vol. I. São Paulo: Ars Poética. 100 pages.
- —. O Retorno Eterno. Campinas: Papirus. 169 pages.
- —. Teologia do Cotidiano. São Paulo: Olho D'Água. 95 pages.
- —. A Alegria de Ensinar. São Paulo: Ars Poética/Petah. 103 pages.
- —. O Quarto do Mistério. Campinas: Speculum/Papirus. 224 pages.
- —. Sobre o Tempo e a Eterna Idade. Campinas: Speculum/Papirus. 164 pages.
- —. A Festa de Maria. Campinas: Papirus/Speculum. 111 pages.
- —. As Contas de Vidro e o Fio de Nylon. São Paulo: Ars Poética. 109 pages.
- —. Cenas da Vida. Campinas: Papirus/Speculum. 128 pages.
- —. Navegando. São Paulo: Ars Poética. 103 pages.
- —. Concerto para Corpo e Alma. Campinas: Papirus. 160 pages.
- —. E Aí? Cartas aos Adolescentes e a Seus Pais. Campinas: Papirus.
- —. Entre a Ciência e a Sapiência: o Dilema da Educação. São Paulo: Loyola. 148 pages.
- —. O Amor que Acende a Lua. Campinas: Papirus/Speculum. 214 pages.
- —. Por uma Educação Romântica: Brevíssimos Exercícios de Imortalidade. Vila Nova de Famalicão, Portugal: Centro de Formação Camilo Castelo Branco. 261 pages.
