= Society for the Arts, Religion and Contemporary Culture =

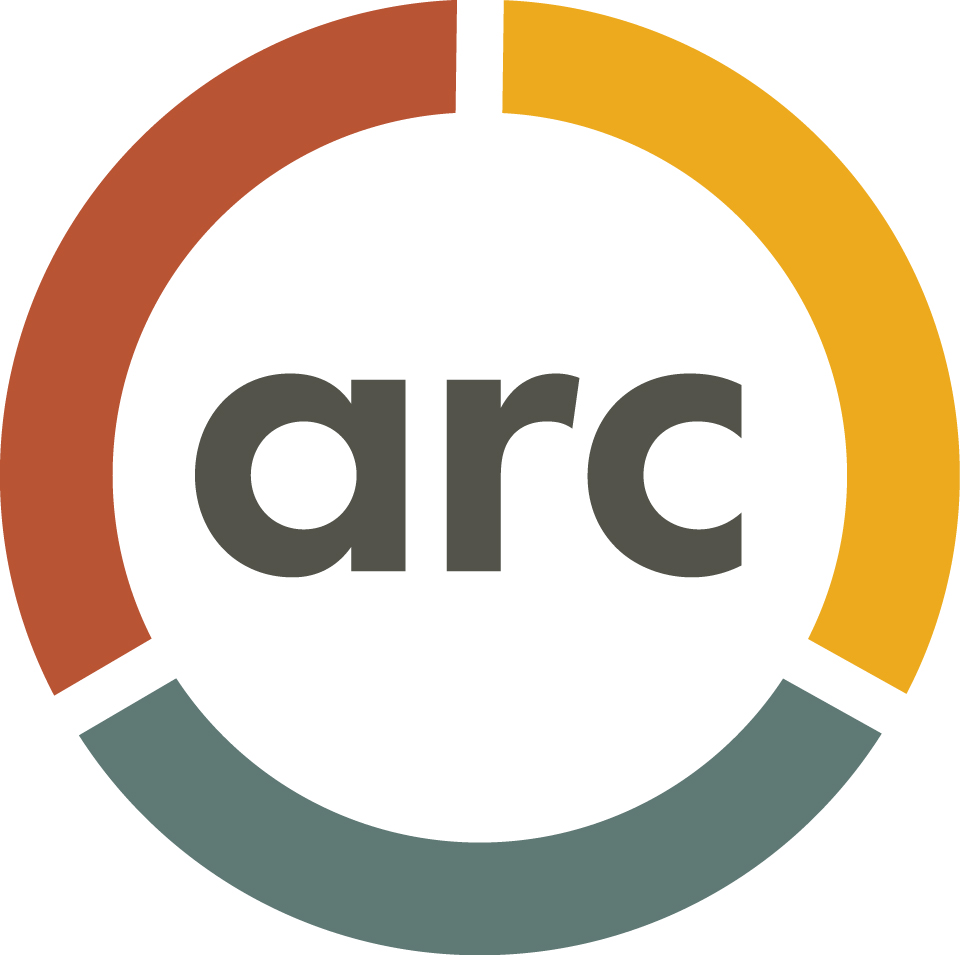
Art Religion Culture (ARC) logo.

The Society for the Arts, Religion, and Contemporary Culture (ARC or SARCC) aims to develop educational and cultural programs on the deep and complex relationship between religion and the arts aesthetics, in what is called sometimes theopoetics.

For decades it hosted several conferences, workshops and performances per year oriented around the relationship between the arts and religion in the modern context and published two periodic newsletters: "ARC Directions" and "Seedbed".

Among its hundreds of fellows and grantees of its Ruben Alves Theopoetics Award the society has cooperated with Joseph Campbell, Mircea Eliade, Denise Levertov, Sallie McFague, Cleanth Brooks, Marianne Moore, W. H. Auden, and John Updike.

Its activities and programming have currently a renewed interest in emerging art forms and social engaged artists around diversity, equity, and inclusion (DEI) and economic injustice.

Its archives are currently maintained by the Andover-Harvard Theological Library.

== History ==
In October 1961 the society was founded by the art critic and founder of the Museum of Modern Art Alfred Barr, the theologian Paul Tillich, and the American Protestant theologian of the Chicago Theological Seminary author of the Great Religious Paintings Marvin Halverson.

In 1962 its first board of directors included the Unitarian Universalist theologian parish minister and principal merger of the United Church of Christ James Luther Adams, the mythologist Joseph Campbell,Truman B. Douglass, the congregationalist parish minister and theologian Amos Wilder, and the theologian and co-founder of the first theology and literature program in the United States Stanley Romaine Hopper.

in the late 1960s most of the individuals involved in the published discourse pertaining to the field of theopoetics were either fellows or members of SARCC. Another major focus of the Society has been the role of myth in culture resulting in two publications.

In the 2000s it organized several day-long conferences on "The Role of the Arts in Religious and Theological Education", hosted at Yale Divinity School, Pacific School of Religion, Lancaster Theological Seminary, And Union Theological Seminary. It later organized a three-part conference on "The Influence of Technology on the Arts and Religion." A summary of this last series, written by former President Erling Hope, is titled "Between God and Google: Reflections on the Technology Project of the Society for the Arts, Religion and Contemporary Culture" and was published in 2012 by CrossCurrents journal.

In 2017, under the stewardship of Executive Director Callid Keefe-Perry and President Erling Hope, it merged with the Association for Theopoetics Research and Exploration (ATRE) and rebranded itself to Arts Religion Culture (ARC).

Its 2019 annual conference took place in Oakland, CA. Tamisha A. Tyler assumed Executive Co-Directorship with Keefe-Perry in 2019, and Ashley Theuring was elected president.

== See also ==
- Kunstreligion
- Religious art
- Religious music
- Theopoetics
- Museum of Contemporary Religious Art (MOCRA)
