= Amos Wilder =

American poet and theologian (1895–1993)

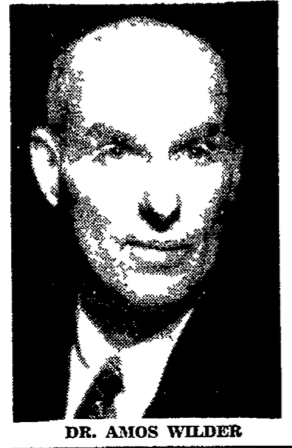

Amos Niven Wilder (September 18, 1895 – May 1, 1993) was an American poet, minister, and theology professor.

== Life ==
Wilder was born in Madison, Wisconsin. He studied for two years at Oberlin College (1913–1915), but volunteered in the Ambulance Field Service; he was awarded the Croix de Guerre. In November 1917, he enlisted in the U.S. Field Artillery as a corporal. He wrote Battle Retrospect, about his experiences in World War I.

In 1920, Wilder graduated from Yale University. In college he was an inter-collegiate doubles champion tennis player, and he played at Wimbledon in 1922, with his partner Lee Wiley. He served as secretary to Albert Schweitzer lecturing at Oxford University, where he was studying at Mansfield College (1921–1923). He completed his studies for ordained ministry at Yale in 1924.

== Ministry ==
Wilder was ordained in 1926 and served in a Congregational church in North Conway, New Hampshire. He received his doctorate from Yale in 1933. He taught for 11 years at the Chicago Theological Seminary and the University of Chicago, and served as president of the Chicago Society of Biblical Research in 1949–1950. Wilder joined Harvard University in 1954 as Hollis Professor of Divinity. In 1962 he was part of the first board of directors for the Society for the Arts, Religion and Contemporary Culture. In 1963, he was named emeritus faculty. His papers are held at the Harvard Divinity School Library of Harvard Divinity School.

== Family ==
Wilder's father, Amos Parker Wilder, was a journalist with a doctorate from Yale, who served as United States Consul General in Hong Kong and Shanghai between 1906 and 1914. His mother was the daughter of a Presbyterian minister. His brother was Thornton Wilder, and sisters were Charlotte Wilder, Isabel Wilder and Janet Wilder Dakin.

Wilder married Catharine Kerlin in 1935. They had a daughter, Catharine Wilder Guiles, and a son, Amos Tappan Wilder.

== Awards ==
- Golden Rose Award
- 1923 Yale Series of Younger Poets, Battle Retrospect

== Works ==
=== Poetry ===
- Arachne: poems. Yale University Press. 1928.
- Battle-Retrospect and Other Poems. Yale University Press. 1923. reprint 1971 by AMS Press.

=== Memoir ===
- Armageddon Revisited. Yale University Press. 1994. ISBN 978-0-300-05560-3.

=== Theology ===
- The spiritual aspects of the new poetry. Harper & Brothers. 1940.
- Eschatology and ethics in the teaching of Jesus. Harper. 1950.
- Liberal learning and religion. National Council on Religion in Higher Education. Harper. 1951.
- Otherworldliness and the New Testament. Harper. 1954.
- New Testament faith for today. Harper. 1955.
- Early Christian Rhetoric: The Language of the Gospel. Harper. 1964.
- Theology and Modern Literature. Harvard University Press. 1967.
- The new voice: religion, literature, hermeneutics. Herder and Herder. 1969.
- Theopoetic: Theology and the Religious Imagination. Fortress Press. 1976.

=== Non-fiction ===
- Thornton Wilder and his public. Fortress Press. 1980. ISBN 978-0-8006-0636-7.

=== Criticism ===
- John Dominic Crossan (1981). A fragile craft: the work of Amos Niven Wilder. Scholars Press.
- William A. Beardslee (1978). The Poetics of Faith: Essays Offered to Amos Niven Wilder. Society of Biblical Literature.

== See also ==
- List of ambulance drivers during World War I
- Theopoetics
