= Amos Parker Wilder =

American journalist and diplomat (1862–1936)

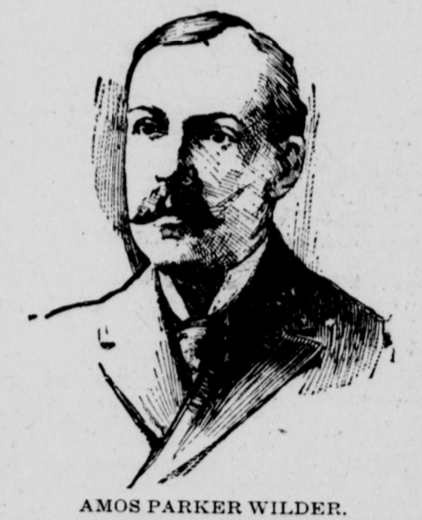

United States Consul General, Hong Kong
- In office 1906–1909
- Preceded by: Wilber T. Gracey
- Succeeded by: George E. Anderson

United States Consul General, Shanghai
- In office 1909–1914
- Preceded by: Charles Denby Jr.
- Succeeded by: Thomas Sammons

Personal details
- Born: February 15, 1862 Calais, Maine, U.S.
- Died: July 2, 1936 (aged 74) New Haven, Connecticut, U.S.
- Children: Amos Wilder; Thornton Wilder; Twin brother of Thornton (died at birth); Charlotte Wilder; Isabel Wilder; Janet Wilder Dakin
- Education: Yale University (AB, PhD)

Amos Parker Wilder (February 15, 1862 – July 2, 1936) was an American journalist and diplomat who served as United States Consul General to Hong Kong and Shanghai in the early 20th century.

== Early life and education ==
Wilder was born on September 10, 1861, in Calais, Maine, the son of Amos Wilder and Charlotte P. Wilder. He earned an A.B. and Ph.D from Yale University.

== Career ==
From 1882 to 1892 he edited the New Haven Palladium, and from 1892 to 1894, worked as an editorial writer in New York City. In 1894, he moved to Wisconsin, where he purchased a one-half interest in the Wisconsin State Journal, and in 1901 acquired controlling interest.

Wilder was a devout Congregationalist and served as a church deacon. He was also and teetotaler and temperance advocate from his youth. He was in favor of women's suffrage.

In 1906, Wilder was appointed United States Consul General in Hong Kong and in 1909 transferred to be United States Consul General in Shanghai, serving until 1914.

In Shanghai, given his views on alcohol, he refused to help an American brewery enter the Chinese market on moral grounds stating he was willing to resign his position.

After returning to the United States, Wilder spent the remainder of his life in the north east of the country, holding various important positions. From 1921 to 1929 was associate editor of the New Haven Journal Courier. He was also head of the Yale-China Program.

== Family ==
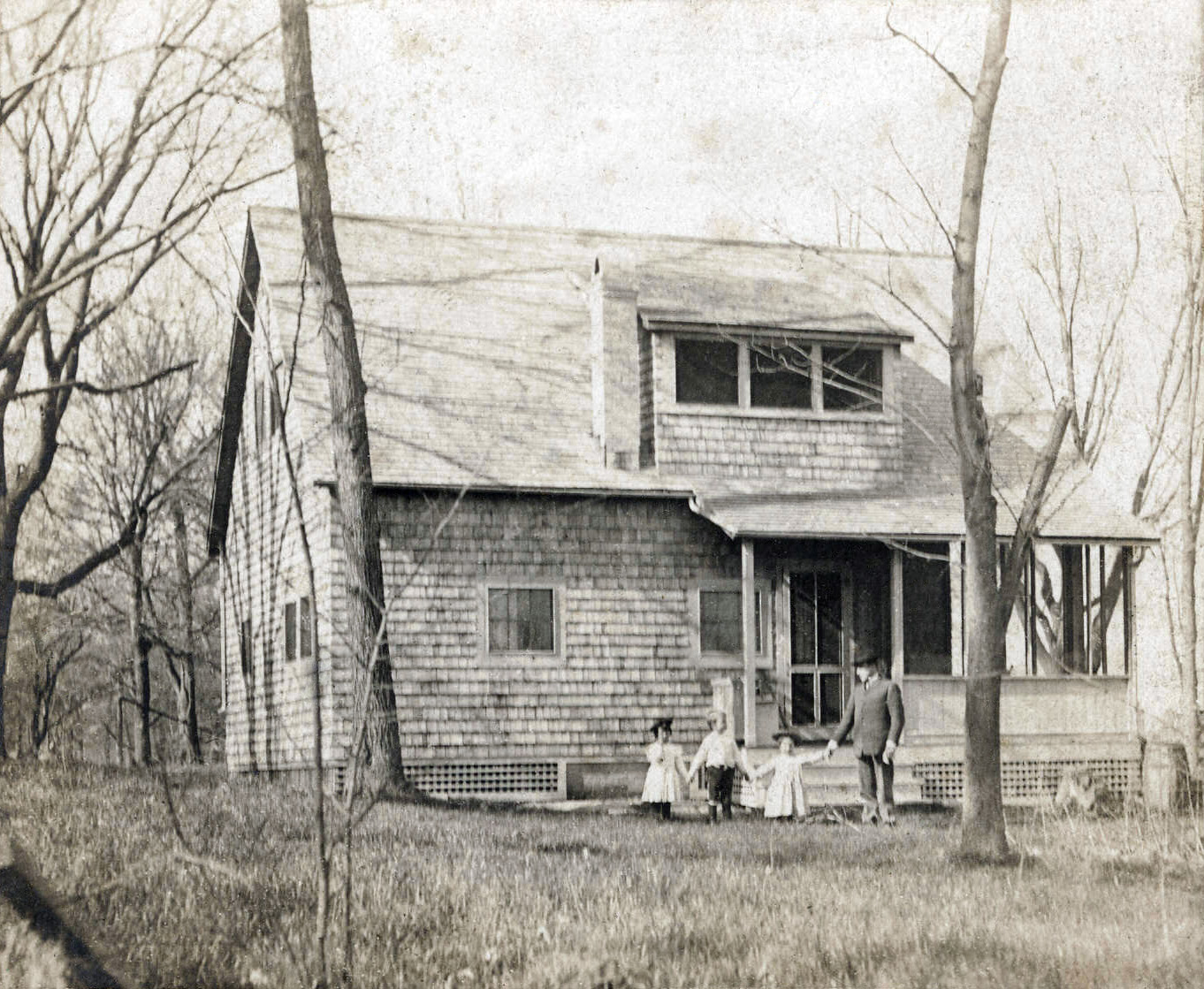
Wilder with three of his children at the family cottage in Maple Bluff, Wisconsin (1900)

Wilder married Isabella Thornton Niven. They had six children: Amos Wilder, a theologian and poet; Thornton Wilder, a writer; Charlotte Wilder, a poet and professor of English; Isabel Wilder, a novelist; and Janet Wilder Dakin, an author and professor of biology. A twin brother of Thornton Wilder died at birth.

== Death ==
Wilder died on July 2, 1936, in New Haven, Connecticut and was buried at Mount Carmel Cemetery in Hamden, Connecticut.
