= Roland Faber =

Academic

Roland Faber (born 1960) is an author and Kilsby Family/John B. Cobb, Jr., Professor of Process Studies at Claremont School of Theology and Professor of Religion and Philosophy at Claremont Graduate University. He is Executive Co-Director of the Center for Process Studies, Executive Director of the Whitehead Research Project in Claremont, California, and Editor of the Contemporary Whitehead Studies series. Faber received a PhD in systematic theology from the University of Vienna in 1992. In 1998, he was appointed assistant professor at the Institute for Dogmatic Theology in Vienna, Austria. In 2005, he received a joint appointment as professor of process theology at Claremont School of Theology and professor of religion at Claremont Graduate University.

Faber has been influential in the ongoing development of process philosophy and theology through organizing annual conferences since 2007 in Claremont. His own research focuses on constructive and deconstructive theology, postmodern and process philosophy, poststructuralism and mysticism, theopoetics and eco-process theology and interreligious studies (particularly transreligious discourse). He announced joining the Baháʼí Faith in 2014.

== Works ==
- Freiheit, Theologie und Lehramt. Trinitätstheologische Grundlegung und wissenschaftstheoretischer Ausblick, Innsbruck: Tyrolia, 1992.
- Variationen über die Schöpfung der Welt, E. Schmetterer (edited with N. Mantler), Innsbruck: Tyrolia, 1995.
- Der Selbsteinsatz Gottes. Grundlegung einer Theologie des Leidens und der Veränderlichkeit Gottes, Studien zur systematischen und spirituellen Theologie 16, Würzburg: Echter, 1995.
- Prozeßtheologie. Zu ihrer Würdigung und kritischen Erneuerung, Mainz: Gruenewald, 2000.
- Gott als Poet der Welt. Anliegen und Perspektiven der Prozesstheologie, 2nd corrected edition, Darmstadt: WBG, 2004.
- God as Poet of the World: Exploring Process Theologies, Louisville: WJK, 2008.
- Event and Decision: Ontology and Politics in Badiou, Deleuze, and Whitehead (edited with Henry Krips and Daniel Pettus), Cambridge: Cambridge Scholars Publishing, 2010.
- Beyond Metaphysics?: Explorations in Alfred North Whitehead's Late Thought (edited with Brian Henning and Clinton Combs), Rodopi, 2010.
- Secrets of Becoming: Negotiating Whitehead, Deleuze, and Butler (edited with Andrea M. Stephenson), New York: Fordham University Press, 2011.
- Butler on Whitehead: On the Occasion (edited with Michael Halewood and Deena Lin), Lexington Books, 2012.
- Theopoetic Folds: Philosophizing Multifariousness (edited with Jeremy Fackenthal), Fordham University Press, 2013.
- Beyond Superlatives: Regenerating Whitehead's Philosophy of Experience (edited with J. R. Hustwit and Hollis Phelps), Newcastle upon Tyne: Cambridge Scholars Press, 2014.
- The Allure of Things: Process and Object in Contemporary Philosophy (edited with Andrew Goffey), Lanham, MD: Bloomsbury Academic, 2014.
- The Divine Manifold Lanham, MD: Lexington Books, 2014.
- Living Traditions and Universal Conviviality: Prospects and Challenges for Peace in Multireligious Communities (edited with Santiago Slabodsky), Lanham, MD: Lexington Books, 2016.
- Baháʼu'lláh and the Luminous Mind: Baháʼí Gloss on a Buddhist Puzzle, in Lights of Irfan 18, 2017.
- The Garden of Reality: Transreligious Relativity in a World of Becoming. Bloomsbury Publishing PLC, 2018.
- The Ocean of God: on the transreligious future of religions. Anthem Press, 2019.
- Divine Appearances: Transreligious Aspects of the Baha'i Discourse on the Manifestation of God, Los Angeles: Kalimát Press, 2022.
