= Mr. North =

1988 film by Danny Huston

- Theatrical release poster
- Directed by: Danny Huston
- Screenplay by: John Huston; James Costigan
- Based on: Theophilus North by Thornton Wilder
- Produced by: John Huston; Steven Haft; Skip Steloff; Tom Shaw
- Starring: Anthony Edwards; Robert Mitchum; Harry Dean Stanton; Anjelica Huston; Mary Stuart Masterson; Virginia Madsen; Tammy Grimes; David Warner; Lauren Bacall
- Cinematography: Robin Vidgeon
- Edited by: Roberto Silvi
- Music by: David McHugh
- Production companies: Heritage Entertainment Inc. Showcase Productions International
- Distributed by: The Samuel Goldwyn Company
- Release date: July 22, 1988
- Running time: 93 minutes
- Country: United States
- Language: English
- Budget: $5.5 million
- Box office: $1,221,366 (limited release)

Mr. North is a 1988 American comedy-drama film starring Anthony Edwards and featuring Robert Mitchum and Lauren Bacall, based on the novel Theophilus North (1973) by Thornton Wilder.

The directorial debut of Danny Huston, the project became a family effort: co-produced and co-written by his father John Huston, it also stars his half-sister Anjelica Huston, and, in a small role, his step-sister Allegra Huston. Danny Huston's future wife Virginia Madsen is also featured. Released a year after John Huston's death, the film marked his final screenwriting credit.

== Plot ==
In 1920s Newport, Rhode Island, Theophilus North is an engaging, multi-talented, middle-class Yale University graduate who spends the summer catering to the wealthy families of the city. He becomes the confidant of James McHenry Bosworth, and a tutor and tennis coach to the families' children. He also befriends many from the city's servant class including Henry Simmons, Amelia Cranston, and Sally Boffin.

Complications arise when some residents begin to ascribe healing powers to the static electricity shocks that Mr. North happens to generate frequently. Despite never claiming any healing or medical abilities, he is accused of quackery, and with the help of those he has befriended, must defend himself.

In the end, Mr. North accepts a position of leadership at an educational and philosophical academy founded by Mr. Bosworth and begins a romance with Bosworth's granddaughter Persis Bosworth-Tennyson.

== Cast ==
- Anthony Edwards as T. Theophilus North
- Robert Mitchum as James McHenry Bosworth
- Lauren Bacall as Amelia Cranston
- Harry Dean Stanton as Henry Simmons
- Anjelica Huston as Persis Bosworth-Tennyson
- Mary Stuart Masterson as Elspeth Skeel
- Virginia Madsen as Sally Boffin
- Tammy Grimes as Sarah Baily-Lewis
- David Warner as Dr. Angus McPherson
- Hunter Carson as Galloper Skeel
- Christopher Durang as YMCA clerk
- Mark Metcalf as George Skeel
- Katharine Houghton as Mrs. Skeel
- Thomas H. Needham as Judge Nicholas Catwalader
- Richard Woods as Willis
- Harriet Rogers as Tante Liselotte
- Layla Summers as Nadia Denby
- Lucas Hall as Joseph Denby
- Thomas-Laurence Hand as Luther Denby
- Linda Peterson as Mrs. Denby
- Cleveland Amory as Mr. Danforth
- Christopher Lawford as Michael Patrick Ennis III
- Marietta Tree as Amanda Venable

== Production ==
Director Danny Huston brought the original script by James Costigan to his father for feedback, and John Huston rewrote it with his Prizzi's Honor co-author Janet Roach. Eugene Lee was the Production Designer.

Originally, John Huston was to play James McHenry Bosworth, but just after filming began, the illness that eventually killed him forced his withdrawal. He was quickly replaced by family friend Robert Mitchum.

== Home media ==
When the film was released on VHS in 1995, it was in its original format. Later, when a DVD version was released, it had undergone an alteration in which the opening credits, visual sequence, and musical score were all edited and juggled around. Portions of T. Theophilus North (Anthony Edwards)'s ride along the Rhode Island coast and countryside where he lives were deleted when the screen fades to a black overlay with newly redone credits for a period of one minute and fifty seconds. The opening score was still used but stretched to accommodate the altered length. The streaming version of the film seems to be a direct copy of the DVD remaster and not the original theatrical version.

== Reception ==
Roger Ebert said that: "The premise is sweet and innocent and the production is handsome, but the film moves slowly and doesn't really hold our attention. [...] Mr. North glows briefly and then slips out of focus."
