= Theopoetics =

Interdisciplinary field of study

Theopoetics in its modern context is an interdisciplinary field of study that combines elements of poetic analysis, process theology, narrative theology, and postmodern philosophy. It was originally developed by Stanley Hopper and David Leroy Miller in the 1960s and furthered significantly by Amos Wilder with his 1976 text, Theopoetic: Theology and the Religious Imagination.

In recent times there has been a revitalized interest with new work being done by two schools of thought in theopoetics.

One school values process theology and postmodern philosophy. It is led by individuals such as L. Callid Keefe-Perry, Rubem Alves, Catherine Keller, John Caputo, Peter Rollins, Scott Holland, Melanie May, Matt Guynn, Roland Faber, and others.

The other school of thought values the philosophical transcendentals as informed by classical theology. It is led by individuals such as Anne M. Carpenter of Saint Louis University, and Richard Viladesau of Fordham University, with contributions from Brian Nixon of Veritas International University. This school of theo-poetics is influenced by the thought of Hans Urs von Balthasar as informed by a range of thinkers as divergent as Gregory of Nyssa, Thomas Aquinas, Maximus the Confessor, Dietrich Richard Alfred von Hildebrand, David Bentley Hart and Pavel Florensky.

== Description ==
Postmodern Theopoetics

The first school of theopoetics suggests that instead of trying to develop a "scientific" theory of God, as systematic theology attempts, theologians should instead try to find God through poetic articulations of their lived ("embodied") experiences. It asks theologians to accept reality as a legitimate source of divine revelation and suggests that both the divine and the real are mysterious — that is, irreducible to literalist dogmas or scientific proofs.

Theopoetics makes significant use of "radical" and "ontological" metaphor to create a more fluid and less stringent referent for the divine. One of the functions of theopoetics is to recalibrate theological perspectives, suggesting that theology can be more akin to poetry than physics. It belies the logical assertion of the principle of bivalence and stands in contrast to some rigid Biblical hermeneutics that suggest that each passage of scripture has only one, usually teleological, interpretation. The dismissal of the aesthetic as a living part of language has turned the academic enterprise of biblical studies and theology into a language more at home with lawyers than poets. Theopoetics is the art of using words and thoughts that speak to the reader in an aesthetic and existential way to inspire spirituality in the reader.

Whereas those who utilize a strict, historical-grammatical approach believe scripture and theology possess inerrant factual meaning and pay attention to historicity, a theopoetic approach takes an allegorical position on faith statements that can be continuously reinterpreted. Theopoetics suggest that just as a poem can take on new meaning depending on the context in which the reader interprets it, texts and experiences of the Divine can and should take on new meaning depending on the changing situation of the individual.

Classical Theopoetics

In the second school of theopoetics, the aim is drawn “from von Balthasar’s affirmation of poetic expression: when God speaks to us in the Incarnation, all qualities of human language—even being itself—are employed as created ‘grammar’ by which God expresses himself to us…With God at the center of expression, poetry becomes capable of an authentic role in theological language.”

This form of theo-poetics “requires the interplay of three massive fields of knowledge: metaphysics, language, and Christology” and is to be “sharply distinguished from the agnostic overtures of the ‘theo-poetics’ movement, whose lineage is not be found in the thought of Balthasar.”

The mythopoetics of the Oxford Inklings (C.S. Lewis, JRR Tolkien, Owen Barfield, Charles Williams, among others) would also be an example of classical theopoetics. Charles Williams gave the name "Romantic Theology" to his project of establishing a subclass of theology at the intersection of imaginative, specifically romantic, literature and classical theology; however this subclass of theology is focused on romantic love between a couple as a way of loving God. C.S. Lewis fits poetry into a broader understanding of theology in his essay "Is Theology Poetry?" Others have called it Christian Romanticism, Mythopoetics or Theopoetics. Northwind Seminary offers a doctoral degree program in the Romantic Theology of the Oxford Inklings. [www.NorthwindSeminary.edu]

== Notable publications ==
=== Books ===
- Ricoeur, Paul (1976), Interpretation Theory: Discourse and the Surplus of Meaning, Fort Worth: Texas Christian Press, ISBN 0-912646-59-4.
- Wilder, Amos Niven (1976), Theopoetic: Theology and the Religious Imagination, Philadelphia: Fortress, ISBN 0-7880-9908-6.
- Alves, Rubem (2002), The Poet The Warrior The Prophet, SCM Press, ISBN 978-0-334-02896-3.
- Carpenter, Anne (2015). Theo-poetics : Hans Urs von Balthasar and the risk of art and being. University of Notre Dame Press. ISBN 978-0-268-07706-8. OCLC 927188404.
- Cruz-Villalobos, Luis (2015). Theological Poetry. Foreword by John D. Caputo. Santiago de Chile: Hebel Ediciones
- Cruz-Villalobos, Luis (2019). Wise Crimes. Santiago de Chile: Hebel Ediciones
- Cruz-Villalobos, Luis (2019). Haikus al Cielo. Santiago de Chile: Hebel Ediciones
- Cruz-Villalobos, Luis (2020). Pauper God. Theographies. Santiago de Chile: Independently Poetry
- Cruz-Villalobos, Luis (2020). Poesía Teológica. Prólogo de John D. Caputo. 2da Ed. Santiago de Chile: Independently Poetry
- Cruz-Villalobos, Luis & Lagunas, Samuel (2020). Plegarias Sórdidas. Santiago de Chile: Independently Poetry.
- Hopper, Stanley Romaine; Keiser, R Melvin (1992), Stoneburner, Tony (ed.), The Way of Transfiguration: Religious Imagination As Theopoiesis, Westminster John Knox Press, ISBN 0-664-21936-5.
- Faber, Roland (2003), Gott als Poet der Welt: Anliegen und Perspektiven der Prozesstheologie [God as Poet of the World: Concerns and Perspectives in Process Theology] (in German), Wissenschaftliche Buchgesellschaft, ISBN 3-534-15864-4.
- Gundy, Jeff. Songs From an Empty Cage: Poetry, Mystery, Anabaptism, and Peace, USA: Cascadia Publishing House, ISBN 9781931038973
- Miller, David L (2006), Hells and Holy Ghosts: A Theopoetics of Christian Belief, USA: Spring Journal Books, ISBN 1-882670-97-3.
- Miller, David L (2005), Three Faces of God: Traces of the Trinity in Literature & Life, USA: Spring Journal Books, ISBN 1-882670-94-9.
- May, Melanie A (1995), A Body Knows: A Theopoetics of Death and Resurrection, Continuum International Publishing, ISBN 0-8264-0849-4
- Nixon, Brian C. (2021). Beauty (and the Banana): A Theopoetic Aesthetic. Wipf & Stock, ISBN 978-1-7252-8532-3
- Keller, Catherine (2003), The Face of the Deep: A Theology of Becoming, Routledge, ISBN 0-415-25649-6
- Bronsink, Troy (2013), Drawn In: A Creative Process For Artists, Activists, and Jesus Followers, Paraclete, ISBN 1557258716
- Harrity, Dave (2013), Making Manifest: On Faith, Creativity, and the Kingdom at Hand, Seedbed, ISBN 1628240229
- Keefe-Perry, L. Callid (2014), Way to Water: A Theopoetics Primer, Cascade, ISBN 978-1625645203
- Garner, Phillip Michael (2017), Theopoetics: Spiritual Poetry for Contemplative Theology and Daily Living, Wipf and Stock, ISBN 9781498243742
- Tagore, Rabindranath (1913/2019). Gitanjali: Song Offering. Santiago de Chile: Independently Poetry

== See also ==
- Poetics
- Biblical theology
- Christian theology
- Narrative or postliberal theology
- Postmodern Christianity
- Secular Theology
- Theologia Poetica
- Theopoesis
- Society for the Arts, Religion and Culture (ARC) Rubem Alves Award for Theopoetics
