= Whitehead Research Project =

Group for scholarship on Alfred North Whitehead

The Whitehead Research Project (WRP) is dedicated to research and scholarship on the texts, philosophy, and life of mathematician and philosopher Alfred North Whitehead. It explores and analyzes the relevance of Whitehead's thought in dialogue with contemporary philosophies in order to unfold his philosophy of organism and its consequences for our time and in relation to emerging philosophical thought.

== History ==
The WRP was conceived and founded in 2005 by Roland Faber. In February 2005, Faber proposed and installed WRP as a project of the Center for Process Studies, a faculty research center of the Claremont School of Theology since 1973, and of which Faber was a co-director. In March 2006, Faber invited Brian G. Henning to serve as the WRP's Director of Research.

The project underwent major organizational changes in 2023. Roland Faber retired, with Brian G. Henning becoming the new Executive Director and Joseph Petek becoming the new Director of Research and Publication. The entire WRP project was also migrated from the Center for Process Studies to Gonzaga University. Finally, separate boards for the Whitehead Research Project and Critical Edition of Whitehead were re-organized and combined into a single Editorial Advisory Board.

== Critical Edition of Whitehead ==
In February 2009, the WRP announced the inauguration of the Critical Edition of Whitehead (CEW), a long-term initiative of the WRP that aims to make available the complete published and unpublished writings of Alfred North Whitehead in a single, critical edition. The early focus of the project was to collect and publish previously unknown Whitehead materials, including the notes of Whitehead’s students taken during his classes at Harvard from 1924–1937.

In March 2014, the WRP reached an agreement with Edinburgh University Press (EUP) to publish the Critical Edition.

The initial volumes of the Critical Edition were of student notes taken during Whitehead's Harvard classes. The first volume of student notes covered his first year of teaching at Harvard and was published in 2017 as The Harvard Lectures of Alfred North Whitehead, 1924-1925: Philosophical Presuppositions of Science, edited by Paul Bogaard and Jason Bell. The second volume of lecture notes – The Harvard Lectures of Alfred North Whitehead: General Metaphysical Problems of Science, 1925-1927, edited by Brian G. Henning, Joseph Petek, and George R. Lucas, Jr. – covered Whitehead’s second and third years teaching at Harvard and was published in 2021.

In August 2023, the Critical Edition of Whitehead was awarded a National Endowment for the Humanities (NEH) Scholarly Editions and Translations grant for $350,000 over a period of three years, starting on January 1, 2024 and ending on December 31, 2026.

Two volumes of Whitehead's collected essays and articles were published in 2025.

A third volume of Harvard lectures is expected to be published in 2026.

The Critical Edition of Whitehead is led by Founder and General Editor Brian G. Henning and Executive Editor Joseph Petek, as well as an editorial advisory board.

== Conferences ==
The WRP has held eleven conferences since December 2007 on topics ranging from Whitehead’s intersection with Badiou and Deleuze, with Judith Butler, and with Pragmatism. Most of the papers delivered at these conferences have been subsequently published in edited books in the Contemporary Whitehead Studies series.

== Contemporary Whitehead Studies ==
In 2009, WRP founded Contemporary Whitehead Studies (CWS), an interdisciplinary book series that publishes manuscripts from scholars with contemporary and innovative approaches to Whitehead studies. As of February 2025, it includes nineteen books.

== Whitehead Research Library ==
In February 2019, the WRP established the Whitehead Research Library (WRL) as a digital platform for sharing archival materials related to Whitehead. Parts of Whitehead’s nachlass – donated to the project by his grandson in January 2019 – are freely available on the platform, with more set to be added as the collection is cataloged.

== Whitehead Encyclopedia ==
In mid-2023, the WRP established the Whitehead Encyclopedia as a platform for providing open access to scholarly articles on Whiteheadian process thought. Its initial content was largely based on the Handbook of Whiteheadian Process Thought (2008, De Gruyter), edited by Michel Weber and Will Desmond. The Encyclopedia is edited by Brian G. Henning and Joseph Petek in consultation with the WRP's Editorial Advisory Board.
