= Contemporary Whitehead Studies =

Interdisciplinary book series

Contemporary Whitehead Studies (CWS) is an interdisciplinary book series that publishes manuscripts from scholars with contemporary and innovative approaches to the studies of Alfred North Whitehead.

The book series was founded in 2009 with Rodopi as a special series in the Value Inquiry Book Series. In 2011 the series moved to Lexington Books, an imprint of Rowman & Littlefield. In 2024 Rowman & Littlefield became an imprint of Bloomsbury Publishing.

Contemporary Whitehead Studies book cover

== Editors ==
- Brian G. Henning, Ph.D., Gonzaga University, USA

== Mission ==
CWS especially seeks projects that:

- explore the connections between Whitehead and contemporary continental philosophy, especially sources, like Heidegger, or contemporary streams like poststructuralism,
- reconnect Whitehead to pragmatism, analytical philosophy and philosophy of language, as a matter of source and recourse for an understanding of the tradition out of which Whitehead formulated his philosophic concepts or as a matter of engagement in areas that have excluded Whitehead,
- explore creative East/West dialogues facilitated by Whitehead's work,
- explore the interconnections of the mathematician with the philosopher and the contemporary importance of these parts of Whitehead's work for the dialogue between sciences and humanities,
- reconnect Whitehead to the wider field of philosophy, the humanities, the sciences and academic research with Whitehead's pluralistic impulses in the context of a pluralistic world,
- address Whitehead's philosophy (and, per example, of philosophy per se) in the midst of contemporary problems facing humanity, such as climate change, war & peace, race, and the future development of civilization.

== Affiliated Project ==
Contemporary Whitehead Studies is affiliated with the Whitehead Research Project.

== Volumes ==
- # 1. Beyond Metaphysics? Explorations in Alfred North Whitehead’s Late Thought, Edited by Roland Faber, Brian G. Henning, and Clinton Combs (2010). ISBN 978-90-420-3121-0 E-ISBN 978-90-420-3122-7
- # 2. Butler on Whitehead, Edited by Roland Faber, Michael Halewood, and Deena Lin (2012). ISBN 978-0-7391-7276-6
- # 3. The Divine Manifold, Roland Faber (2014). ISBN 978-0-7391-9139-2. E-ISBN 978-0-7391-9140-8.
- # 4. Foundations of Relational Realism: A Topological Approach to Quantum Mechanics and the Philosophy of Nature, Michael Epperson and Elias Zafaris (2015). ISBN 978-0-7391-8032-7. E-ISBN 978-0-7391-8033-4.
- # 5. Thinking with Whitehead and the American Pragmatists Experience and Reality, Brian G. Henning, William T. Myers, and Joseph D. John (2015). ISBN 978-0-7391-9031-9. E-ISBN 978-0-7391-9032-6.
- # 6. Creaturely Cosmologies Why Metaphysics Matters for Animal and Planetary Liberation, Brianne Donaldson (2015). ISBN 978-1-4985-0179-8. E-ISBN 978-1-4985-0180-4.
- # 7. Tragic Beauty in Whitehead and Japanese Aesthetics, Steve Odin (2016). ISBN 978-1-4985-1477-4. E-ISBN 978-1-4985-1478-1.
- # 8. Beyond Whitehead: Recent Advances in Process Thought, Jakub Dziadkowiec, Lukasz Lamza (2017). ISBN 978-1-4985-5468-8. E-ISBN 978-1-4985-5469-5.
- # 9. Whitehead and Continental Philosophy in the Twenty-First Century: Dislocations, Jeremy Fackenthal (2019). ISBN 978-1-4985-9510-0. E-ISBN 978-1-4985-9511-7.
- # 10. Propositions in the Making: Experiments in a Whiteheadian Laboratory, Roland Faber, Michael Halewood, and Andrew M. Davis (2019). ISBN 978-1-7936-1256-4. E-ISBN 978-1-7936-1257-1.
- # 11. Whitehead’s Radically Temporalist Metaphysics: Recovering the Seriousness of Time, George Allan (2020). ISBN 978-1-7936-2003-3. E-ISBN 978-1-7936-2004-0.
- # 12. Mind, Value, and Cosmos: On the Relational Nature of Ultimacy, Andrew M. Davis (2020). ISBN 978-1-7936-3639-3. E-ISBN 978-1-7936-3640-9.
- # 13. Untying the Gordian Knot: Process, Reality, and Context, Timothy E. Eastman (2020). ISBN 978-1-7936-3916-5. E-ISBN 978-1-7936-3917-2.
- # 14. On Philosophy, Intelligibility, and the Ordinary: Going the Bloody Hard Way, Randy Ramal (2021). ISBN 978-1-7936-3880-9. E-ISBN 978-1-7936-3881-6.
- # 15. Whitehead and the Pittsburgh School Lisa Landoe Hedrick (2022). ISBN 978-1-7936-4659-0. E-ISBN 978-1-7936-4658-3.
- # 16. Unearthing the Unknown Whitehead, Joseph Petek (2022). ISBN 978-1-66692-012-3.
- # 17. Virginia Woolf as a Process-Oriented Thinker, Veronika Krajíčková (2023). ISBN 978-1-6669-4229-3.
- # 18. Astrophilosophy, Exotheology, and Cosmic Religion, Andrew Davis and Roland Faber, eds. (2024). ISBN 978-1-6669-4436-5.
- # 19. Greening Philosophy of Religion, Jea Sophia Oh and John Quiring, eds. (2024). ISBN 978-1-6669-5494-4.
