= Alice Trythall Washburn =

American architect (1870–1958)

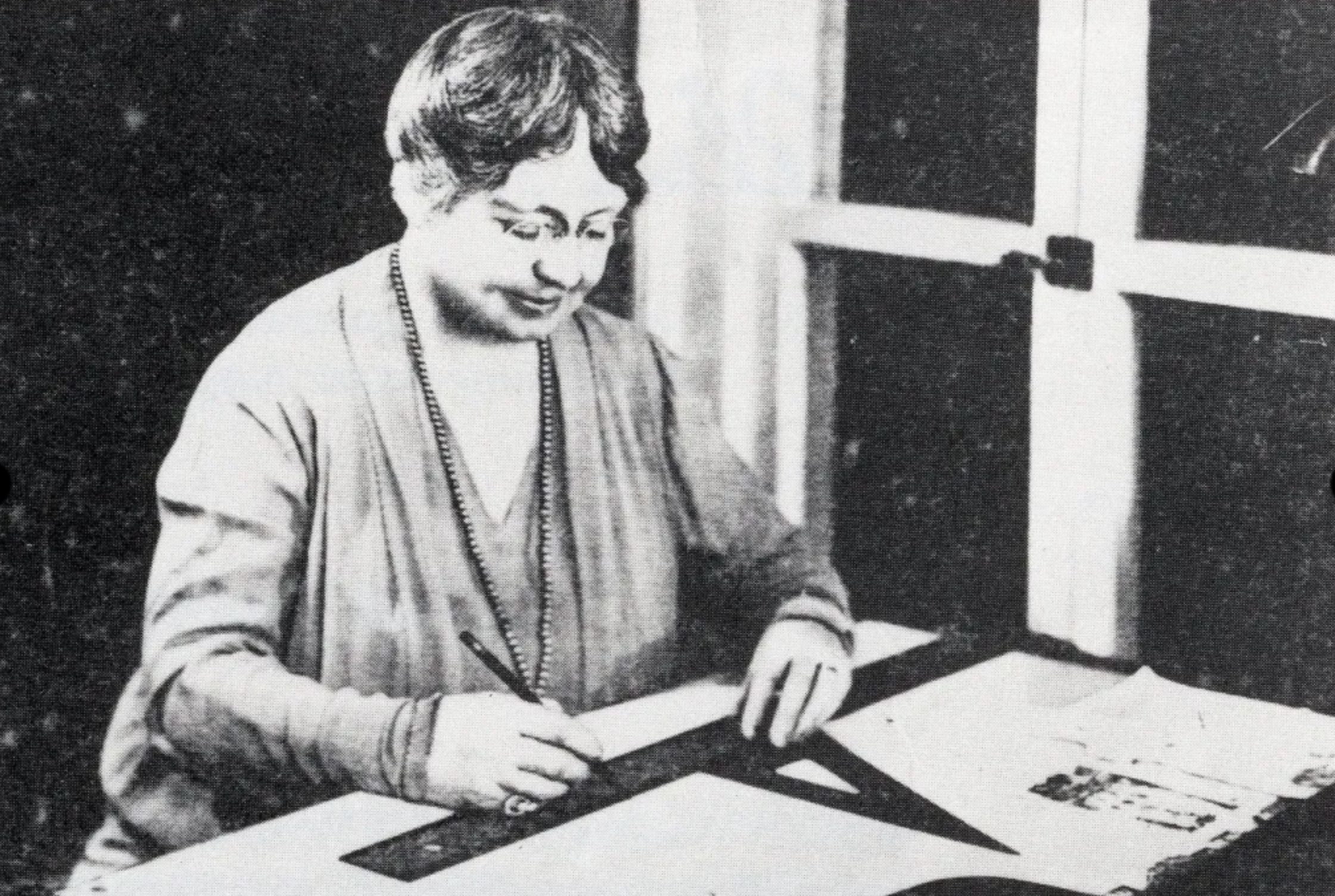
- Born: Alice Frances Trythall; July 15, 1870
- Died: November 17, 1958 (aged 88)
- Occupation: Architect
- Spouse: Edward Washburn (m. 1896)
- Children: 2

Alice Trythall Washburn (July 15, 1870 – November 17, 1958) was an American self-taught architect who designed so many homes in New Haven County that she is considered the founder of a distinct typology: the "Washburn Colonial". While she died relatively unknown, her work has been the subject of retrospectives and exhibits, beginning in 1990 at the Eli Whitney Museum in Hamden, Connecticut. In 2003, the American Institute of Architects Connecticut began issuing an award in her honour; the Alice Washburn House Award acknowledges excellence in traditional house design.

== Early life ==
Born Alice Frances Trythall, she was the youngest of four children born to Samuel Trythall, a farmer born in Cornwall, England, and Frances Preston, a descendant of early settlers of Cheshire, Connecticut. Trythall was raised in the Preston family homestead on Cornwall Avenue in Cheshire and attended a school for young ladies located close by. Despite census records that indicate she didn't finish high school or go to college, she is reported by family history to have trained as a teacher, and became the principal of a high school in Springfield, Massachusetts. In 1896 she married Edward Washburn, who was in the wallpaper business, and raised two children.

== Architectural career ==
In 1919, Alice Washburn began designing colonial-style houses with reportedly no training. According to her family, she taught herself how to design houses by studying the work of New England houses built by master builders from the 18th and 19th centuries. Apparently, she went on an extended road trip in which she took "photographs, measurements, and even plaster casts of details from the houses she saw on her travels." Her granddaughter, Ann Butler, reported that she "believed that, because society had traditionally placed women in charge of domestic affairs, they were uniquely qualified to design houses."

Washburn began experimenting with her designs through renovations to her childhood home. She then proceeded to start a business, using her own financing to buy property and hire contractors to build her designs. Her business experienced significant growth in the early 1920s due to the onset of suburban living in Connecticut, as farms in the New Haven outskirts were sold off and subdivided. Washburn went on to build between 80 and 90 homes, approximately 8-9 per year, mostly in the Hamden area. In addition to her self-initiated projects, Washburn was commissioned by many prominent figures, such as playwright Thornton Wilder, who requested a medieval English-style home built in 1929.

== Style ==
Washburn houses are known for their functional floor plans, abundance of light, and details. Generally working in the Colonial Revival style (with some exceptions), Washburn designs tend to be symmetrical. She placed a high value on craftsmanship and was known to supervise every detail of construction, prioritizing meticulous touches over budget, to the point of taking on the added cost herself if it came to that. Classical columns were employed generously, along with lavish hand-crafted bannisters, curving walkways, and each home was reported to have its own, unique fireplace.

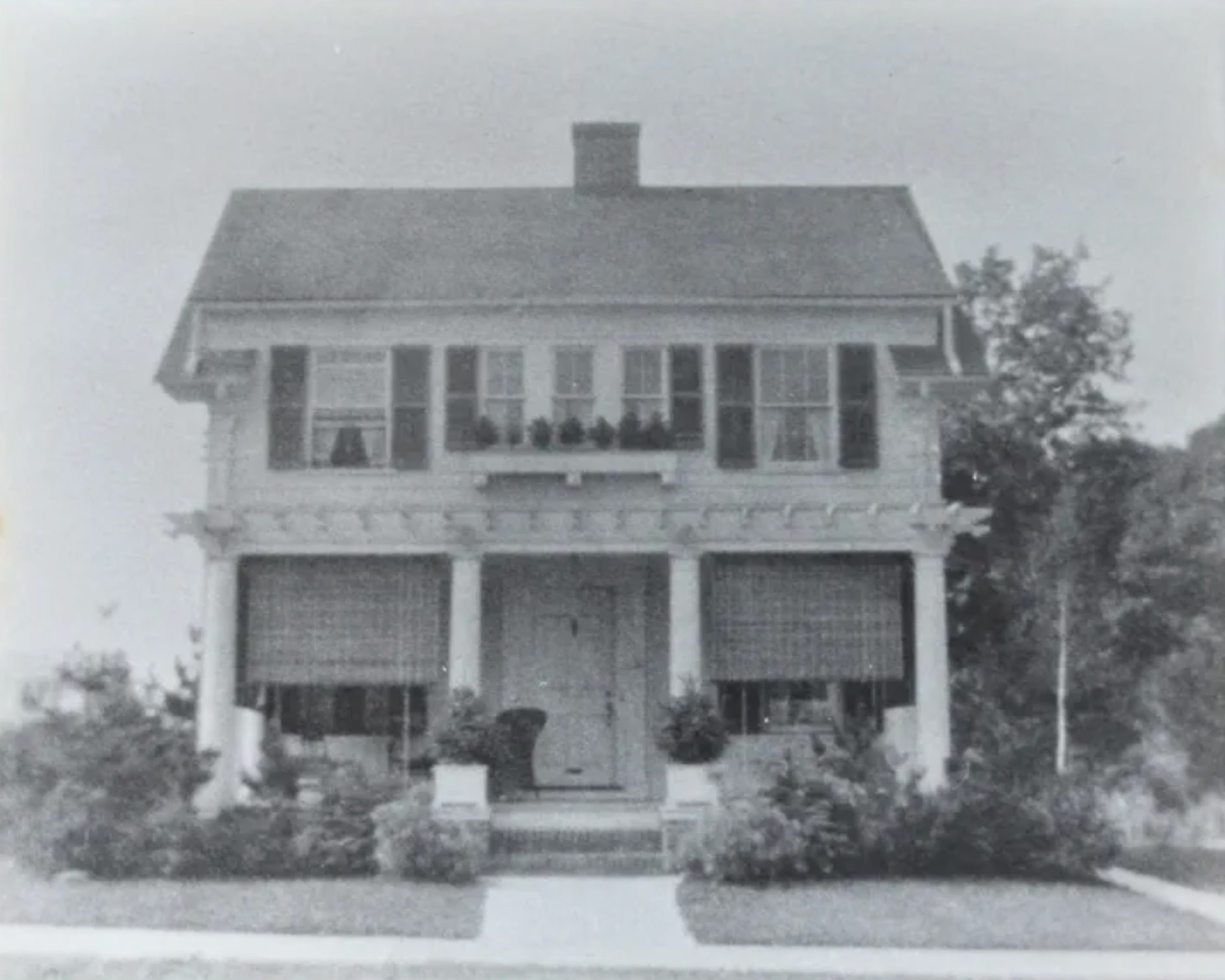
Early photo of Washburn home in Spring Glen

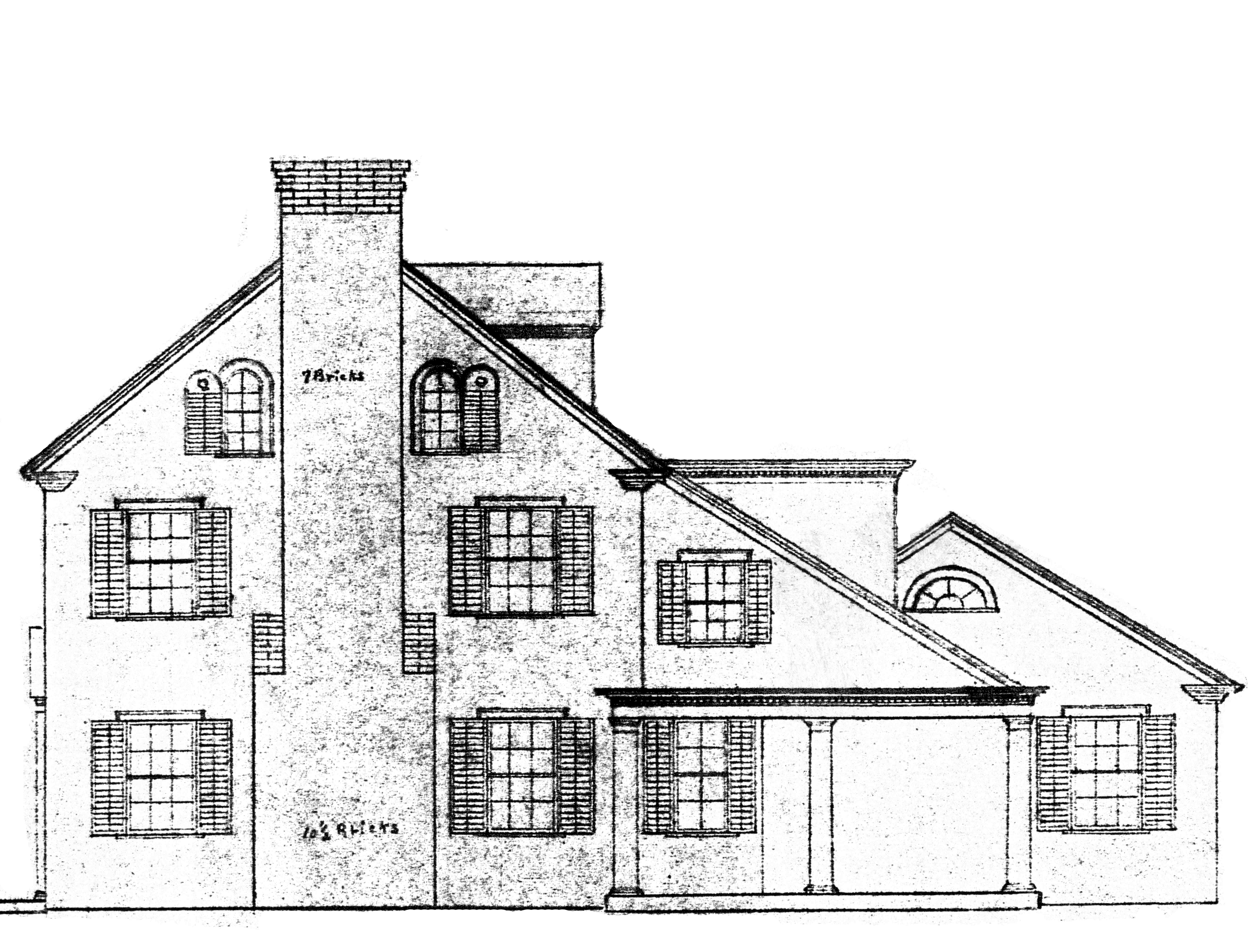
Blueprint of elevation by Alice Trythall Washburn

== Social context ==
While less than 1% of architects at the time were women, Washburn's work can be interpreted as part of timely movements. During the housing expansion that she flourished in, it was not unusual for houses to be designed by those who had no formal training. Additionally, in 1919 the Nineteenth Amendment to the United States Constitution was passed, giving women the right to vote; according to historian Emily Clark, "female entrepreneurs in all professions blossomed" following this landmark decision.

Washburn was known to be "very tough… she'd ask her crew to tear apart a bookcase that wasn't right even if the client was happy with it;" this meticulous work ethic was attributed to being a woman in a male-dominated field.

== Legacy ==
It is speculated that Washburn's perfectionism may have contributed to her downfall; as Jim Collins describes, through the work of biographer Martha Yellig:

"insisting on the highest-quality materials or a certain window or fireplace treatment, even when the owners couldn't afford it – increasingly required her to pay money out of her own pocket, costing her profits. When the Depression hit a few years later, Mrs. Washburn owed more than $82,000 to local suppliers and contractors. The courts stripped her of nearly everything she owned, including the family homestead in Cheshire where she grew up."

She declared bankruptcy in 1931, and, as her husband had died in 1926, moved into an apartment with her sister in Cheshire. When she died in 1958, her occupation was listed as housewife. While her career was not celebrated widely during her lifetime, that began to change in later years in which she became known for her thoughtful designs, as well as for being so prolific. As William Brown, the director of the Eli Whitney Museum, is quoted as saying in a 1990 New York Times article:

"Alice Washburn was not the greatest architect who ever lived, or even the greatest woman architect. But to build so many houses so late in life and to have those houses so loved is an extraordinary achievement."

== Alice Washburn Award ==
A yearly prize given by the Connecticut branch of the American Institute of Architecture pays homage to Washburn's iconic homes:

"The Alice Washburn Award is named for the distinguished Connecticut designer and builder of the 1920's, largely self-taught, whose work is known for her thoughtful stylistic and programmatic invention. Focusing on style: the program acknowledges excellence in traditional house design through the thoughtful adaptation of tradition to address 21st-century needs. Works are to be located in Connecticut and designed in a style broadly considered as 'traditional.'"
