= Charlotte Wilder =

American poet (1898–1980)

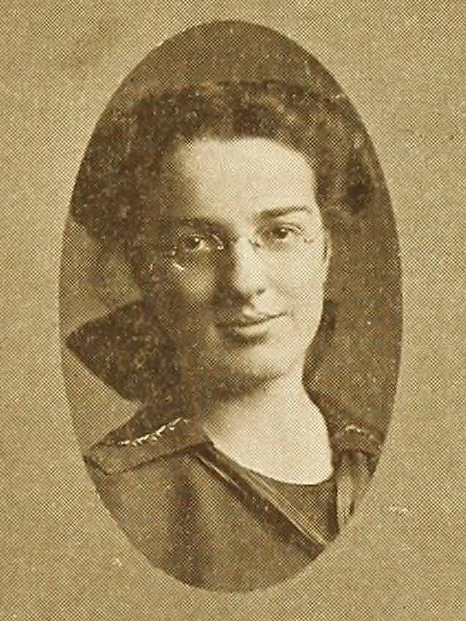
- Wilder c. 1915
- Born: August 28, 1898; New Haven, Connecticut, U.S.
- Died: May 26, 1980 (aged 81); Brattleboro, Vermont, U.S.
- Resting place: Mount Carmel Cemetery, Hamden, New Haven County, Connecticut, U.S.
- Education: Berkeley High School (Berkeley, California), Mount Holyoke College, Radcliffe College
- Notable work: Phases of the Moon (1936) and Mortal Sequence (1939)

Charlotte Elizabeth Wilder (August 28, 1898 – May 26, 1980) was an American poet and academic who worked in the Federal Writers Project.

Wilder published poetry in The Nation and Poetry Magazine. She also published poetry collections in 1936 and 1939.

== Life ==
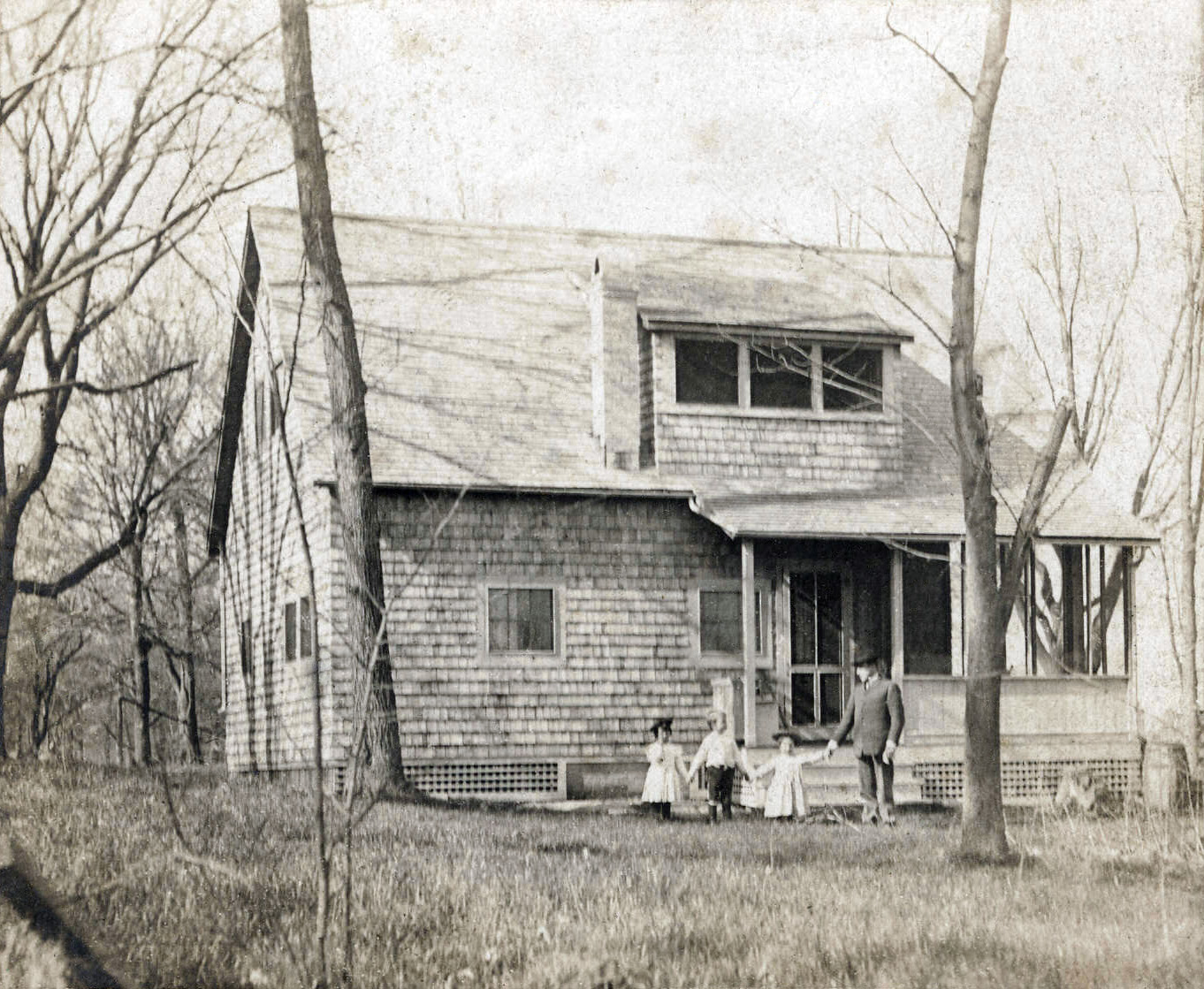
Charlotte with her father Amos, brother Thornton and one other sibling at family cottage in Maple Bluff, Wisconsin (1900)

Wilder was the daughter of diplomat Amos Parker Wilder and Isabella Thornton Niven. She was the third child and eldest sister of Thornton Wilder, Isabel Wilder, Janet Wilder Dakin, and Amos Wilder.

Wilder grew up in Berkeley, California, and graduated from Berkeley High School. In 1919, she received her Bachelor of Arts in English literature, magna cum laude, Phi Beta Kappa from Mount Holyoke College in 1919. In 1925, Wilder received an M.A. from Radcliffe College.

After graduation from college, Wilder taught at Wheaton College. In 1928, she became an assistant professor of English at Smith College, where she taught until 1931. In 1934, Wilder became a full-time poet.

Wilder also worked for the Atlantic Monthly as a proof reader and for The Youth's Companion.

According to an article in the January 15, 1983, issue of The Nation, ("New Deal New York" by Frederika Randall), Wilder worked on the Federal Writers' Project during the 1930s.

Wilder experienced a mental health crisis in 1941, the repercussions of which lasted until her death. She died on May 26, 1980, in a nursing home in Brattleboro.

== Select poetry ==
The following works appeared in The Nation:

- Loew's Sheridan, Volume 146, Issue 0025, June 18, 1938
- Isolation, Volume 138, Issue 3594, May 23, 1934
- Sculptured, Volume 138, Issue 3577, January 24, 1934

The following works appeared in Poetry Magazine:

- The Last Hour, Volume 24, July 1924, Page 200
- Of Persons Not Alive, Volume 39, March 1932, Page 303
- City Streets, Volume 47, January 1936, Page 198
- To Beauty, Volume 47, January 1936, Page 198
- Sanctuary, Volume 52, July 1938, Page 202
- Mortal Sequence, Volume 55, January 1940, Page 217 (see Daly, James)

Two collections of her work were published by Coward-McCann, Inc.: Phases of the Moon (1936) and Mortal Sequence (1939).

== Awards ==
- 1937: Wilder shared the Shelley Memorial Award for Poetry in 1937 with Ben Belitt
