= Serene Jones =

American Protestant theologian and seminary president (born 1959)

The Reverend Serene Jones
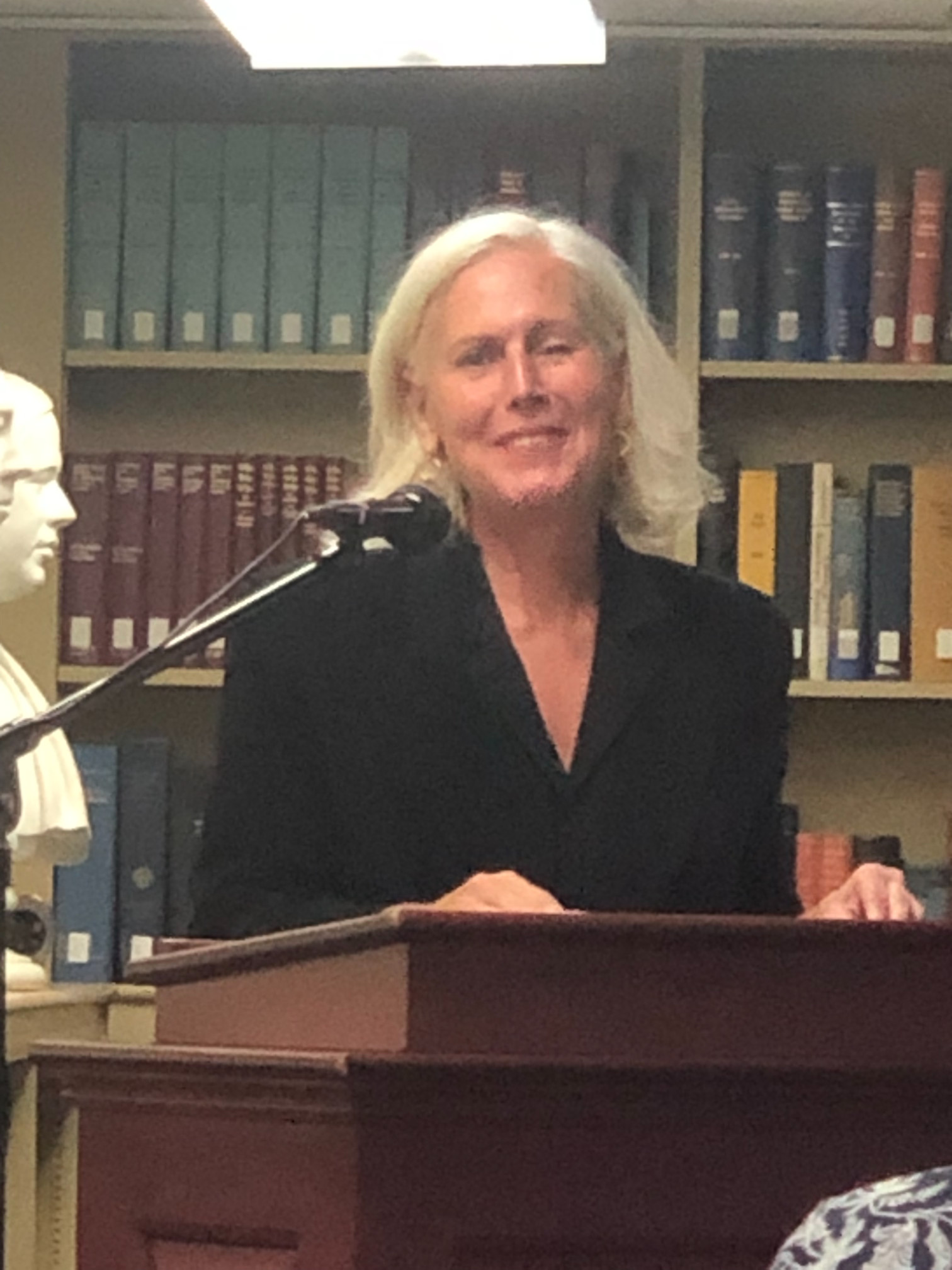
- Jones at the Presbyterian Historical Society in 2023
- Born: Lynda Serene Jones; July 31, 1959 (age 67); New Haven, Connecticut, US
- Title: President of Union Theological Seminary (since 2008)

Ecclesiastical career
- Religion: Christianity
- Church: Christian Church (Disciples of Christ); United Church of Christ

Academic background
- Education: University of Oklahoma; Yale University
- Thesis: "Fulfilled in Your Hearing" (1991)
- Doctoral advisor: David Kelsey; Kathryn Tanner
- Influences: John Calvin

Academic work
- Discipline: Theology
- School or tradition: Christian feminism; theological liberalism
- Institutions: Yale University; Union Theological Seminary
- Notable works: Feminist Theory and Christian Theology (2000)

Lynda Serene Jones (born 1959) is an American Protestant theologian. She is the president and Johnston Family Professor for Religion and Democracy at Union Theological Seminary in the City of New York. She was formerly the Titus Street Professor of Theology at Yale Divinity School and chair of gender, woman, and sexuality studies at Yale University. In July 2025, Jones announced that she would step down as president of Union Theological Seminary at the end of the 2025–2026 academic year.

== Biography ==
Born Lynda Serene Jones on July 31, 1959, she is the eldest of three daughters. Her mother, Sarah Jones, was a licensed psychotherapist. Her father, Joe Robert Jones, was a graduate of Yale Divinity School and served as Dean of the Graduate Seminary (1975–1979) and President of Phillips University from 1979 to 1988. Serene is a graduate of Enid High School in Enid, Oklahoma. Serene's younger sister Kindy Jones is Assistant Attorney General for the State of Oklahoma. Her youngest sister, Verity Jones, is a former Disciples of Christ pastor and editor of DisciplesWorld.

After graduating with a Bachelor of Arts degree from the University of Oklahoma, Jones earned a Master of Divinity degree from Yale Divinity School in 1985, and a Doctor of Philosophy degree in theology from Yale University in 1991. She is an ordained minister in both the Christian Church (Disciples of Christ) and the United Church of Christ. She taught at Yale University for seventeen years where she served as the Titus Street Professor of Theology at the Divinity School and chair of Women, Gender and Sexuality Studies in the Graduate School of Arts and Sciences.

On July 1, 2008, Jones succeeded Joseph Hough as President of Union Theological Seminary in the City of New York. Jones is the 16th president of Union and the first woman to head the interdenominational seminary. She occupies the Johnston Family Chair for Religion and Democracy and has formed Union's Institute for Women, Religion and Globalization as well as the Institute for Art, Religion and Social Justice. She was the president of the American Academy of Religion for 2016.

In July 2025, Jones announced that she would step down as president of Union Theological Seminary at the end of the 2025–2026 academic year.

== Publications ==
- Jones has published 37 articles and book chapters since 1991.
- Her work has appeared in Time magazine.
- In May 2014 she was interviewed by Georgetown University's Berkley Center for Religion, Peace and World Affairs.
- She has written and co-written over 10 articles for the Huffington Post.

== Works ==
=== Books ===
- Jones, Serene (1995). Calvin and the Rhetoric of Piety. Louisville, KY: Westminster, John Knox Press. ISBN 978-0-664-22070-9. OCLC 32551494.
- ——— (2000). Feminist Theory and Christian Theology: Cartographies of Grace. Minneapolis, MN: Fortress Press. ISBN 978-1-4514-1822-4. OCLC 43708566.
- ——— (2009). Trauma and Grace: Theology in a Ruptured World. Louisville, KY: Presbyterian Publishing Corp. ISBN 978-0-664-23410-2. OCLC 308214892.
- ——— (2019). Call It Grace: Finding Meaning in a Fractured World. New York, NY: Viking. ISBN 9780735223646.

=== Edited ===
- ———; Pauw, Amy Plantinga, eds. (2006). Feminist and Womanist Essays in Reformed Dogmatics. Columbia Series in Reformed Theology. Louisville, KY: Westminster, John Knox Press. ISBN 978-0-664-22437-0. OCLC 61879752.
- ———; Lakeland, Paul, eds. (2005). Constructive Theology: A Contemporary Engagement with Classical Themes; Workgroup on Constructive Christian Theology. Minneapolis, MN: Fortress Press. ISBN 978-0-800-63683-8. OCLC 56194890.
- ———; Farley, Margaret A., eds. (1999). Liberating Eschatology: Essays in Honor of Letty M. Russell. Louisville, KY: Westminster, John Knox Press. ISBN 978-0-664-25788-0.
- ———; Brock, Rita Nakashima; Camp, Claudia, eds. (1995). Setting the Table: Women in Theological Conversation. St. Louis, MO: Chalice Press. ISBN 978-0-827-23433-8. OCLC 33008267.

=== Articles and chapters ===
- ——— (1995). ""Women's experience" between a rock and a hard place: feminist, womanist and 'mujerista' theologies in North America". Religious Studies Review. 21 (3): 171–178. doi:10.1111/j.1748-0922.1995.tb00117.x.
- ——— (2005). "Companionable Wisdoms: What Insights Might Feminist Theorists Gather from Feminist Theologians?". In Ward, Graham (ed.). The Blackwell Companion to Postmodern Theology. Malden, MA: Blackwell Publishing. pp. 294–308. ISBN 978-1-405-12719-6.
- ——— (2001). "Bounded Openness: postmodernism, feminism, and the church today". Interpretation. 55 (1): 49–59. doi:10.1177/002096430005500105. S2CID 144325223.
