= Union Theological Seminary =

Christian seminary in New York City

- Seal of Union Theological Seminary
- Latin: Seminarium Theologicum Unioniense Novi Eboraci
- Other name: Union Theological Seminary in the City of New York
- Motto: Unitas, Veritas, Caritas (Latin)
- Motto in English: Unity, Truth, Love
- Type: Private seminary
- Established: 1836; 190 years ago
- Endowment: $112.6 million (2019)
- President: Lisa L. Thompson
- Faculty: 38
- Students: 210
- Location: New York City, New York, United States
- Website: utsnyc.edu
- Union Theological Seminary
- U.S. National Register of Historic Places
- New York City Landmark
- Location within New York City Location within New York Location within the United States
- Location: W. 120th St. and Broadway, New York, NY 10027
- Coordinates: 40°48′41″N 73°57′51″W
- Area: 2.3 acres (0.93 ha)
- Built: 1908
- Architect: Allen & Collens
- Architectural style: Late Gothic Revival, Collegiate Gothic
- NRHP reference No.: 80002725
- NYCL No.: 0595

Significant dates
- Added to NRHP: April 23, 1980
- Designated NYCL: November 15, 1967 (Brown Memorial Tower, James Tower, James Memorial Chapel)

The Union Theological Seminary in the City of New York (often shortened to UTS or Union) is a private, ecumenical, liberal Christian seminary in Morningside Heights, Manhattan, New York City. It has been affiliated with Columbia University since 1928.

Presently, Columbia University lists UTS among its affiliate schools, along with the Columbia-degree conferring Barnard College and Teachers College. Beginning in 1928 and continuing until an indeterminate juncture, UTS "[had] the status of a [Columbia] University faculty in the educational system of the University through representation" on the now-defunct University Council. In 1964, UTS also established an affiliation with the neighboring Jewish Theological Seminary of America. Despite its affiliation with Columbia University, UTS has remained an independent institution with its own administration, degrees and Board of Trustees. UTS confers the following degrees: Master of Divinity (MDiv), Master of Divinity & Social Work dual degree (MDSW), Master of Arts in religion (MAR), Master of Arts in Social Justice (MASJ), Master of Sacred Theology (STM), Doctor of Ministry (DMin), and Doctor of Philosophy (PhD).

UTS is the oldest independent seminary in the United States and has long been known as a bastion of progressive Christian scholarship, with a number of prominent thinkers among its faculty or alumni. It was founded in 1836 by members of a predecessor to the Presbyterian Church in the USA, but was open to students of all denominations. In 1893, UTS rescinded the right of the General Assembly of the Presbyterian Church to veto faculty appointments, thus becoming fully independent. In the 20th century, Union became a center of liberal Christianity. It served as the birthplace of the Black theology, womanist theology, and other theological movements. It houses the Burke Library at Union Theological Seminary, one of the largest theological libraries in the Western Hemisphere.

== History ==
=== Early history ===
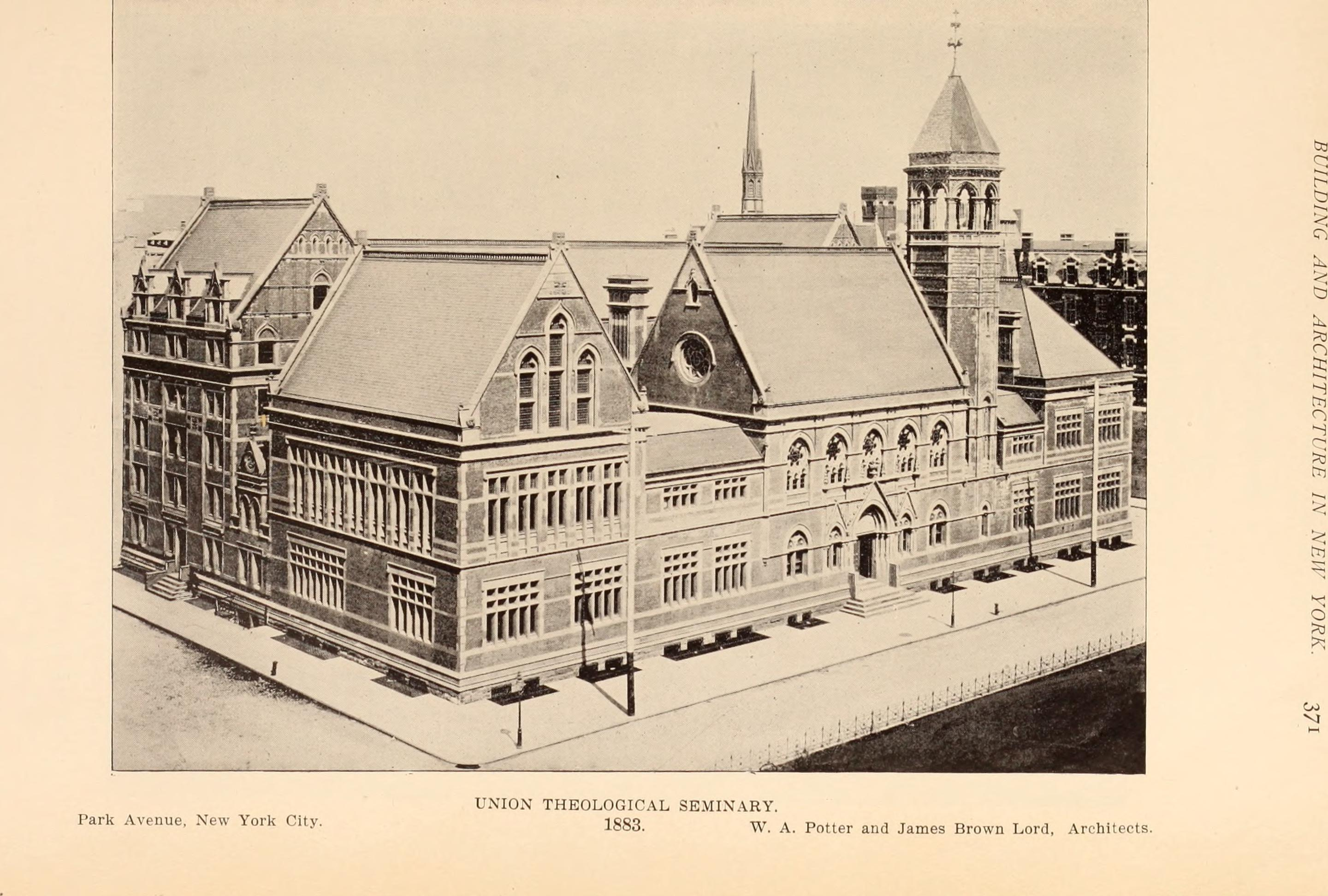
1883 campus, Park Avenue and 70th Street

Union Theological Seminary was founded in 1836. During the late 19th century it became one of the leading centers of liberal Christianity in the United States. In 1891, Charles A. Briggs, who was being installed as the chair of biblical studies, delivered an inaugural address in which he questioned the verbal inspiration of Scripture. When the General Assembly of the Presbyterian Church in the U.S.A. vetoed Briggs' appointment and eventually deposed Briggs for heresy two years later, Union removed itself from denominational oversight. In 1939, Auburn Theological Seminary moved to the campus. After 75 years Auburn departed in 2014.

Among its graduates were the historian of Christianity Arthur McGiffert; biblical scholar James Moffatt; Harry Emerson Fosdick, the pastor of Riverside Church who served as professor during his tenure there; James Strong, the first President of Carleton College; and the Socialist leader Norman Thomas.

==== Union Settlement ====
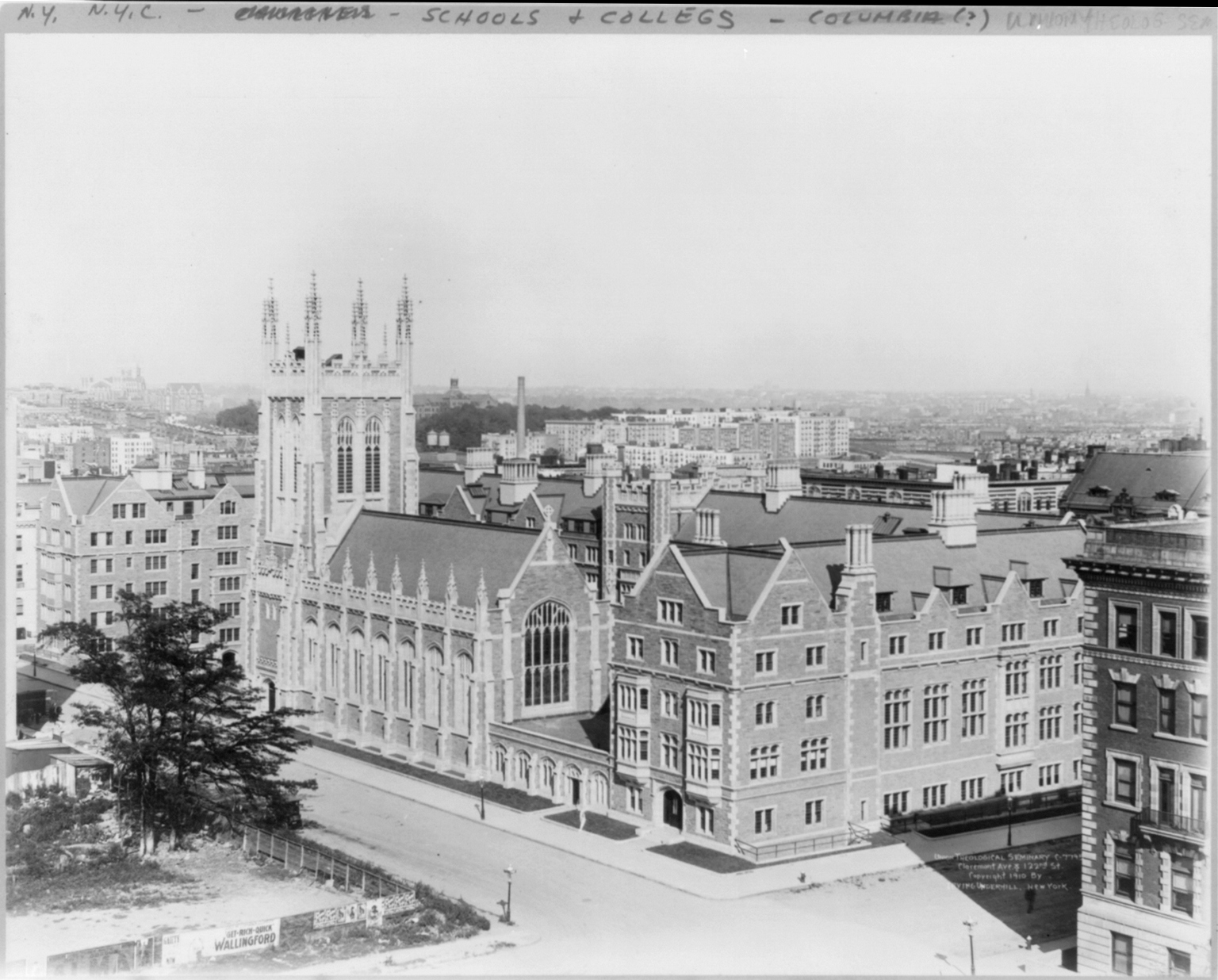
Side view at Claremont Avenue between W. 120th and W. 119th streets (1910)

In 1895, members of the Union Theological Seminary Alumni Club founded Union Settlement Association, one of the oldest settlement houses in New York City. After visiting Toynbee Hall in London and inspired by the example of Hull House in Chicago, the alumni decided to create a settlement house in the area of Manhattan enclosed on the north and south by East 96th and 110th Streets and on the east and west by the East River and Central Park.

The neighborhood, known as East Harlem, was filled with new tenements but devoid of any civic services. The ethos of the settlement house movement called for its workers to "settle" in such neighborhoods in order to learn first-hand the problems of the residents. "It seemed to us that, as early settlers, we had a chance to grow up with the community and affect its development," wrote William Adams Brown, Theology Professor, Union Theological Society (1892–1930) and President, Union Settlement Association (1915–1919).

Union Settlement still exists, providing community-based services and programs to support the immigrant and low-income residents of East Harlem. One of East Harlem's largest social service agencies, Union Settlement reaches more than 13,000 people annually at 17 locations throughout East Harlem through a range of programs, including early childhood education, youth development, senior services, job training, the arts, adult education, nutrition, counseling, a farmers' market, community development, and neighborhood cultural events.

=== 20th century to present ===
Reinhold Niebuhr and Paul Tillich made UTS the center of both liberal and neo-orthodox Protestantism in the inter-war period. Niebuhr joined UTS in 1929 and Tillich in 1933. Prominent public intellectual Cornel West commenced a promising academic career at UTS in 1977. As liberalism lost ground to conservatism after the 1960s (while neo-orthodoxy dissipated) and thus declined in prestige, UTS ran into financial difficulties and shrank significantly because of a reduced student base.

Eventually, the school agreed to lease some of its buildings to Columbia University and to transfer ownership of and responsibility for the Burke Library to Columbia. These agreements helped stabilize the school's finances, which had been hobbled by increasing library costs and the need for substantial campus repairs.

On July 1, 2008, feminist theologian Serene Jones became UTS's first female president in its 172-year history, succeeding Joseph C. Hough Jr.

On June 10, 2014, Jones announced that UTS would be joining the movement to divest from the fossil fuels industry in protest at the damage the industry is causing to the environment. UTS's $108 million endowment will no longer include any fossil fuel investments. On May 9, 2024, UTS's Board of Trustees voted to endorse divestment from "companies profiting from the war in Palestine" and announced that they will be joining the Interfaith Center on Corporate Responsibility.

Brown Memorial Tower (center) and Claremont Hall (right) was built on the UTS block (2026)

Classroom and faculty space was added to UTS in the early 2020s as part of the construction of Claremont Hall, a 41-story residential condominium at 100 Claremont Avenue. UTS owns 27 of the apartments in Claremont Hall.

Although administratively independent from Columbia, UTS is affiliated through representation by one voting faculty member and one non-voting student observer in the Columbia University Senate.

On July 1, 2026, Lisa L. Thompson became Union's 17th president.

=== Presidents ===
No.	Name	Term	Ref
1	Thomas McAuley	1836–1840	
2	Joel Parker	1840–1842	
– (Note: From 1842 to 1873, Union chose no person to serve as president of the seminary. However, the longest serving professor was sometimes recognized as the unofficial head of the faculty as "senior professor.")	Henry White	1842–1850	
–	Edward Robinson	1850–1863	
–	Thomas Harvey Skinner	1863–1871	
–	Henry Boynton Smith	1871–1873	
3	William Adams	1873–1880	
4	Roswell Dwight Hitchcock	1880–1887	
–	William Greenough Thayer Shedd (Note: Shedd served as acting president.)	1887–1888	
5	Thomas Samuel Hastings	1888–1897	
6	Charles Cuthbert Hall	1897–1908	
7	Francis Brown	1908–1916	
8	Arthur Cushman McGiffert (Note: McGiffert first served as acting president after the death of Francis Brown from 1916 to 1917.)	1916–1926	
9	Henry Sloane Coffin (Note: Coffin was originally elected to the presidency in 1916 but declined the post.)	1926–1945	
10	Henry P. Van Dusen	1945–1963	
11	John Coleman Bennett	1963–1970	
12	J. Brooke Mosley	1970–1974	
–	Roger Shinn (Note: Shinn served as interim president.)	1974–1975	
13	Donald W. Shriver Jr.	1975–1991	
14	Holland L. Hendrix	1991–1998	
15	Joseph C. Hough Jr.	1999–2008	
16	Serene Jones	2008–2026	
17	Lisa L. Thompson	2026–present	

== Campus ==
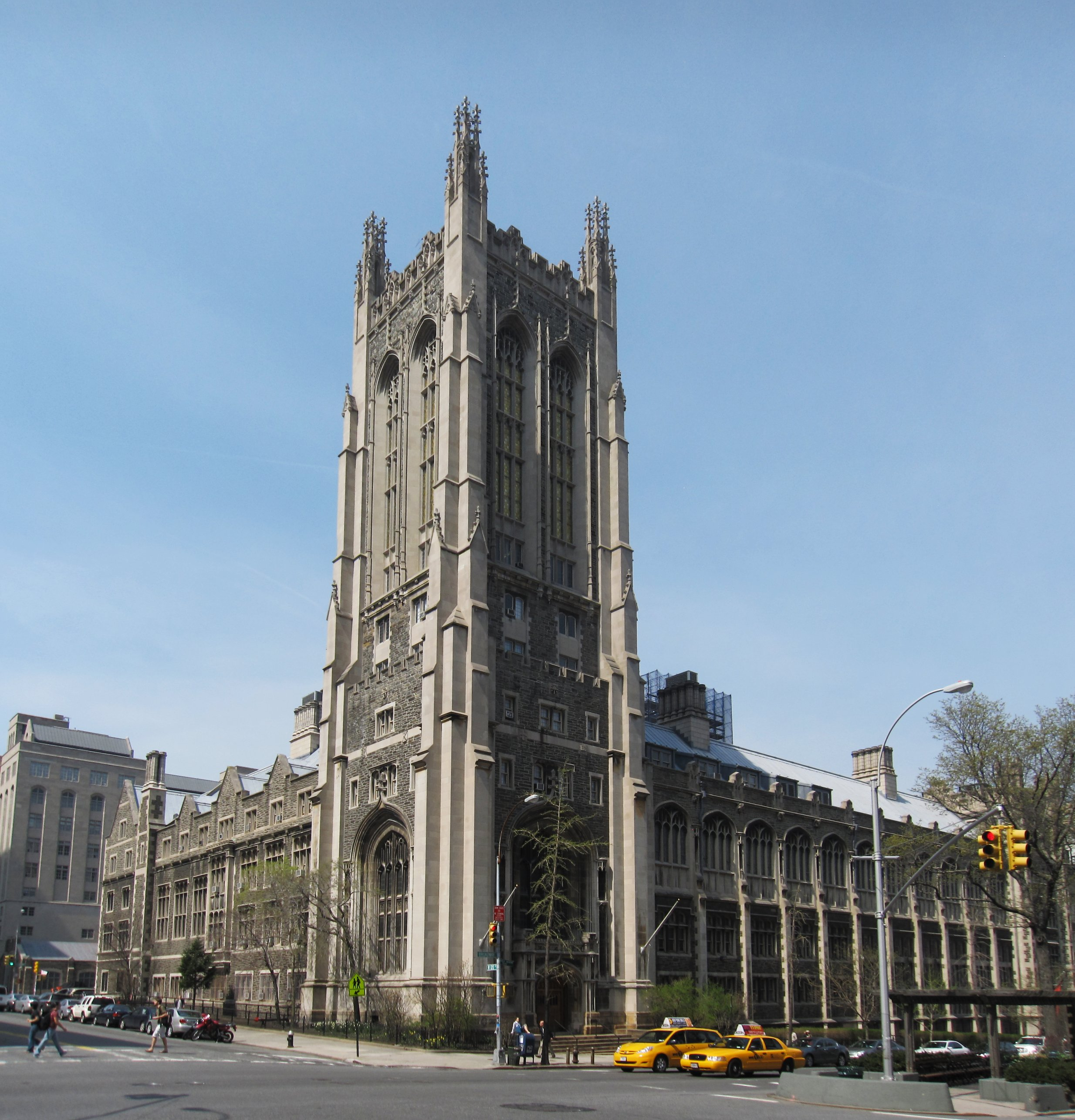
Brown Memorial Tower

Union Theological Seminary entrance on Broadway

UTS's campus is located in the Morningside Heights neighborhood of Manhattan, New York City, bordered by Claremont Avenue, Broadway, and West 120th and 122nd Streets. The brick and limestone English Gothic revival architecture, by architects Allen & Collens, completed in 1910, includes the tower, which adapts features of the crossing tower of Durham Cathedral. Adjacent to Teachers College, Barnard College, the Jewish Theological Seminary of America, and the Manhattan School of Music, Union has cross-registration and library access agreements with all of these schools.

The building was added to the National Register of Historic Places on April 23, 1980, and parts were made a New York City designated landmark in 1965. Some sections of the campus are now on long-term lease to Columbia University.

=== Library ===
The Burke Library at Union Theological Seminary, one of the largest theological libraries in North America, contains over 700,000 items. Burke's holdings include extensive special collections, including Greek census records from 20 C.E., a rare 12th-century manuscript of the Life of St. Boniface, and one of the first African-American hymnals, published in Philadelphia in 1818.

The Burke Library also maintains a number of world-renowned archival collections, including the Archives of Women in Theological Scholarship and the Missionary Research Library Archives.

In 2004, the Burke Library became fully integrated into the Columbia University Libraries system, which holds over 14 million volumes. The library is named in honor of Walter Burke, a generous benefactor to the library who served as chairman of the Board of Directors of the Seminary from 1976 to 1982.

== Faculty ==
Both Reinhold Niebuhr and Paul Tillich taught at the seminary. Niebuhr joined the faculty in 1929 and retired in 1952. Tillich was recruited by Niebuhr to UTS following his dismissal from the University of Frankfurt. Nazi officials terminated Tillich from the University of Frankfurt and placed him on their list of "undesirables". Tillich subsequently narrowly escaped arrest by the Gestapo in October 1933 and made his way out of Germany joining UTS in December 1933.

In 1930, Dietrich Bonhoeffer was a Postgraduate Teaching Fellow at the seminary. He later returned in 1939 to be a member of the faculty and to escape Nazi harassment in Germany. Writing of his experience there in his book Barcelona, Berlin, New York, Bonhoeffer was dismayed by the liberalism of the seminary and its students, noting, "The students are completely clueless with respect to what dogmatics is really about. They are not familiar with even the most basic questions. They become intoxicated with liberal and humanistic phrases, are amused at the fundamentalists, and yet basically are not even up to their level...." Referring to Union Seminary, Bonhoeffer noted: "A seminary in which numerous students openly laugh during a public lecture because they find it amusing when a passage on sin and forgiveness ...is cited has obviously, despite its many advantages, forgotten what Christian theology in its very essence stands for" (pp. 309–10). He soon regretted his decision and decided that he had to return to Germany to resist the Nazis. He took the last ship from New York to Germany in late August 1939. Due to his secret involvement with the 20 July plot on Hitler's life, he was executed at the Flossenbürg concentration camp on April 8, 1945, only 15 days before the United States Army liberated the camp.

American theologian, James Hal Cone, one of the founders of liberation theology and influential in the development of Black theology, began teaching at Union Theological Seminary in New York City in 1970, holding the distinguished Charles A. Briggs Chair in systematic theology from 1977 until his death in 2018.

Serene Jones, the seminary's first female president, was inaugurated in November 2008. Civil rights activist Cornel West joined the faculty in July 2012, and rejoined in 2021.

=== Notable current faculty ===
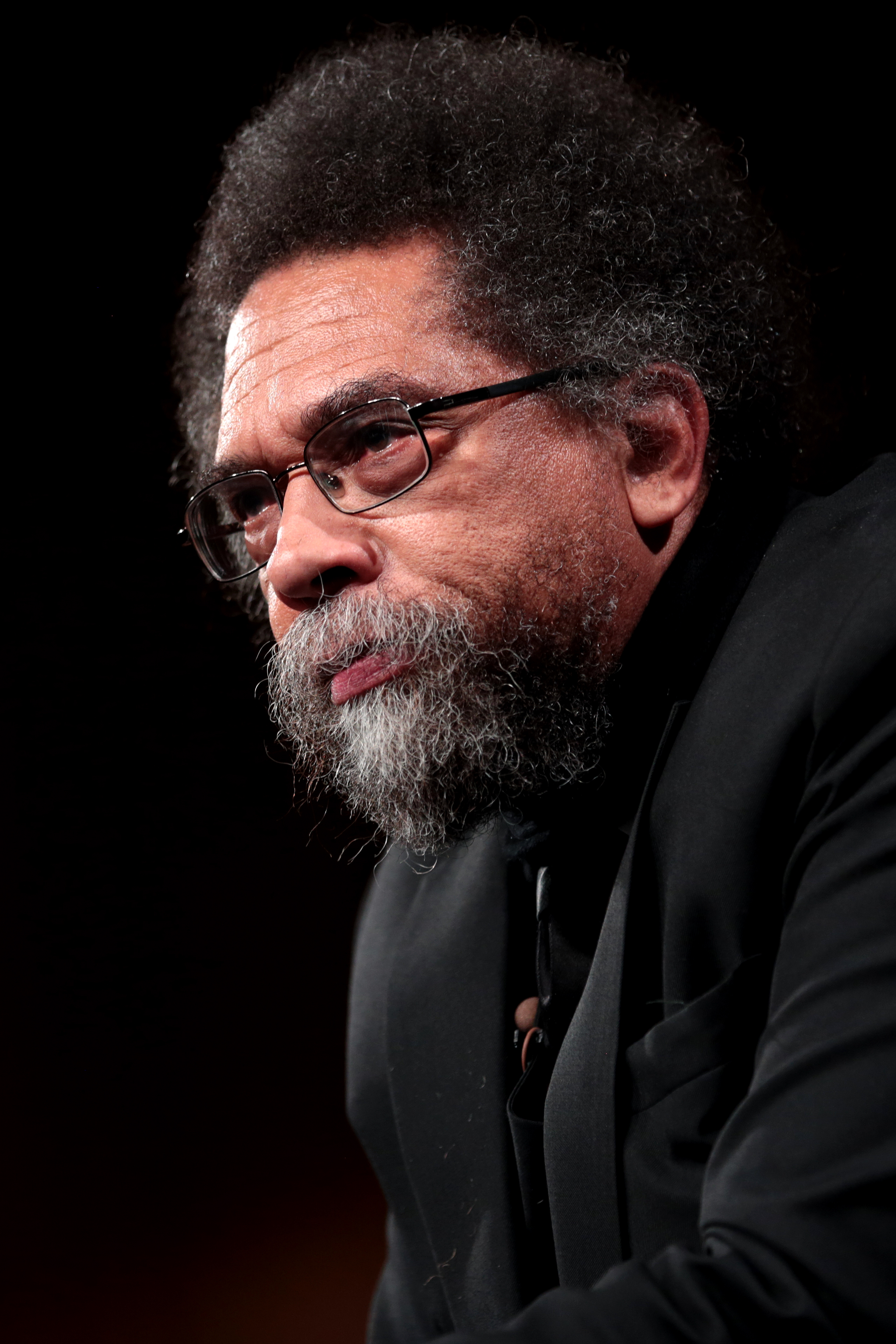
Cornel West

- Mary C. Boys – Skinner and McAlpin Professor of Practical Theology
- David M. Carr – Professor of Old Testament; contributed to Genesis in the New Oxford Annotated Bible (New Revised Standard Version)
- Euan Cameron – Henry Luce, III Professor of Reformation Church History
- Alan Cooper – Appointed Professor of Bible in 1998, becoming the first person to hold a joint professorship at both Union and the Jewish Theological Seminary of America. His dual appointment has been described as a major step in strengthening ties between the two seminaries.
- Pamela Cooper-White – Christiane Brooks Johnson Professor of Psychology and Religion
- Kelly Brown Douglas – Dean of the Episcopal Divinity School at Union Theological Seminary as well as the Canon Theologian at the Washington National Cathedral.
- Gary Dorrien – American social ethicist and theologian, Reinhold Niebuhr Professor of Social Ethics
- Roger Haight – Visiting professor of Theology
- Chung Hyun Kyung – Associate Professor of Ecumenical Theology
- Cornel West – Professor of Religious Philosophy and Christian Practice

=== Notable former faculty ===
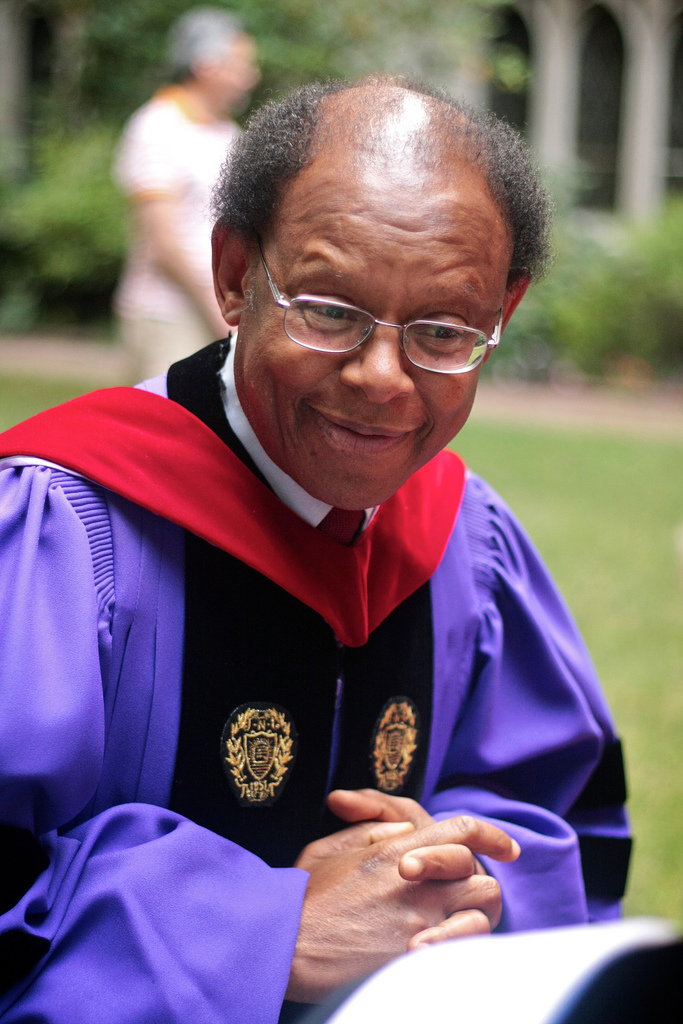
James Cone

- Michelle Alexander – writer, civil rights advocate, author of The New Jim Crow: Mass Incarceration in the Age of Colorblindness, opinion columnist for The New York Times. Visiting professor from 2016 to 2021.
- Charles Augustus Briggs – Professor of Hebrew and Cognate Languages (1874–1891) and of Biblical Theology (1891–1904); an important early leader of the Modernist movement
- Raymond E. Brown (1928–1998) – Professor of New Testament (1971–1990), member of the Pontifical Bible Commission, and the first Catholic to gain tenure
- Charles Butler (1802–1897) – founder
- Henry Sloane Coffin – President of Union and a leading theological liberal. Coffin also obtained his Bachelor of Divinity from the Union Theological Seminary in 1900. He declined an offer to become president of Union Theological Seminary in 1916. In 1926, offered the presidency (a second time), he accepted and retained the post until 1945.
- James Cone (1936–2018) – a founder of Black theology, he was Charles Augustus Briggs Distinguished Professor of Systematic Theology until his death
- W. D. Davies, (1911–2001) – Welsh-born Edward Robinson Professor of Biblical Theology, noted New Testament scholar and Congregationalist Minister.
- Harrison S. Elliot (1882–1951) – author and leader in the Y.M.C.A., Religious Education Association, and Union Theological Seminary.
- James A. Forbes, Joe R. Engle Professor of Preaching before becoming senior pastor of Riverside Church, after which he continued to serve as an adjunct professor.
- Harry Emerson Fosdick – First minister of Riverside Church and professor of homiletics
- Beverly Wildung Harrison – a Christian feminist ethicist, she taught for 34 years at Union and was the Caroline Williams Beaird Professor of Ethics. She was the first woman president of the North American Society of Christian Ethics.
- Paul F. Knitter – Paul Tillich Professor of Theology
- John Macquarrie – Professor of Systematic Theology (1962–1970), afterwards Lady Margaret Professor of Divinity in the University of Oxford and Canon Residentiary of Christ Church, Oxford (1970–1986)
- John Anthony McGuckin – Nielsen Professor of Early and Byzantine Church History, President of the Sophia Institute, Archpriest of the Orthodox Church
- Christopher Morse – Dietrich Bonhoeffer Professor of Theology & Ethics
- J. Brooke Mosley, president
- Reinhold Niebuhr (1892–1971) – Professor of Applied Christianity – Christian social ethics, author of the influential The Nature and Destiny of Man (1941), and the Serenity Prayer (popularized through the Twelve-step program)
- Peter C. Phan – the inaugural holder of the Ellacuria Chair of Catholic Social Thought at Georgetown University
- Robert Pollack – professor of Science and Religion
- Edward Robinson – Biblical scholar and discoverer of Robinson's Arch and Hezekiah's Tunnel in Jerusalem
- Philip Schaff (1819–1893) – Theologian and ecclesiastical historian who served as chair of theological encyclopedia and Christian symbolism, then as chair of Hebrew and the cognate languages, followed by chair of sacred literature, and finally chair of church history until his death in 1893.
- William Greenough Thayer Shedd – Professor of Sacred Literature (1863–1874) and of Systematic Theology (1874–1890)
- Dorothee Soelle – Socially engaged German theologian
- Paul Tillich (1886–1965) – German-American theologian and Christian existentialist philosopher
- Phyllis Trible (b. 1932) – Ph.D. from Union 1963; Baldwin Professor of Sacred Literature, 1980–1998; served as a visiting professor of Old Testament after retirement; donated papers to Burke Library.
- Ann Belford Ulanov – Christiane Brooks Johnson Memorial Professor of Psychiatry and Religion
- Harry F. Ward – chairman of the ACLU and Professor of Ethics
- Delores S. Williams – earned her PhD from Union Theological Seminary, and later became the Paul Tillich Professor of Feminist Theology at Union Theological Seminary Her title was later changed to the Paul Tillich Professor of Theology and Culture. Following retirement, she became professor emerita.
- Walter Wink – Biblical scholar and activist

== Notable alumni ==
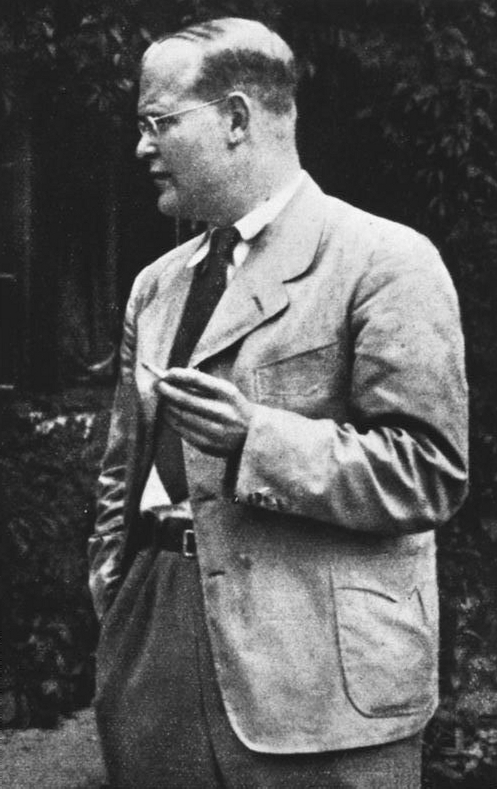
Dietrich Bonhoeffer

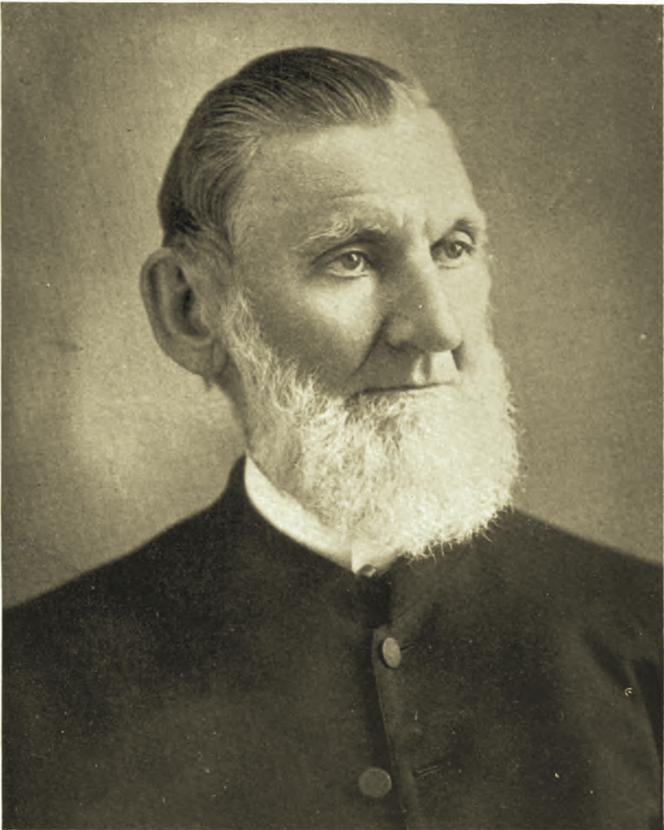
Oliver Crane

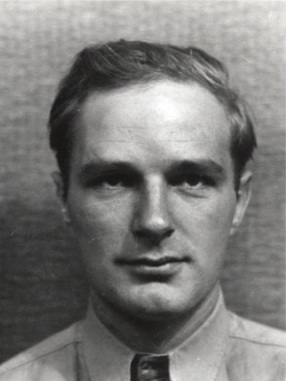
David Dellinger

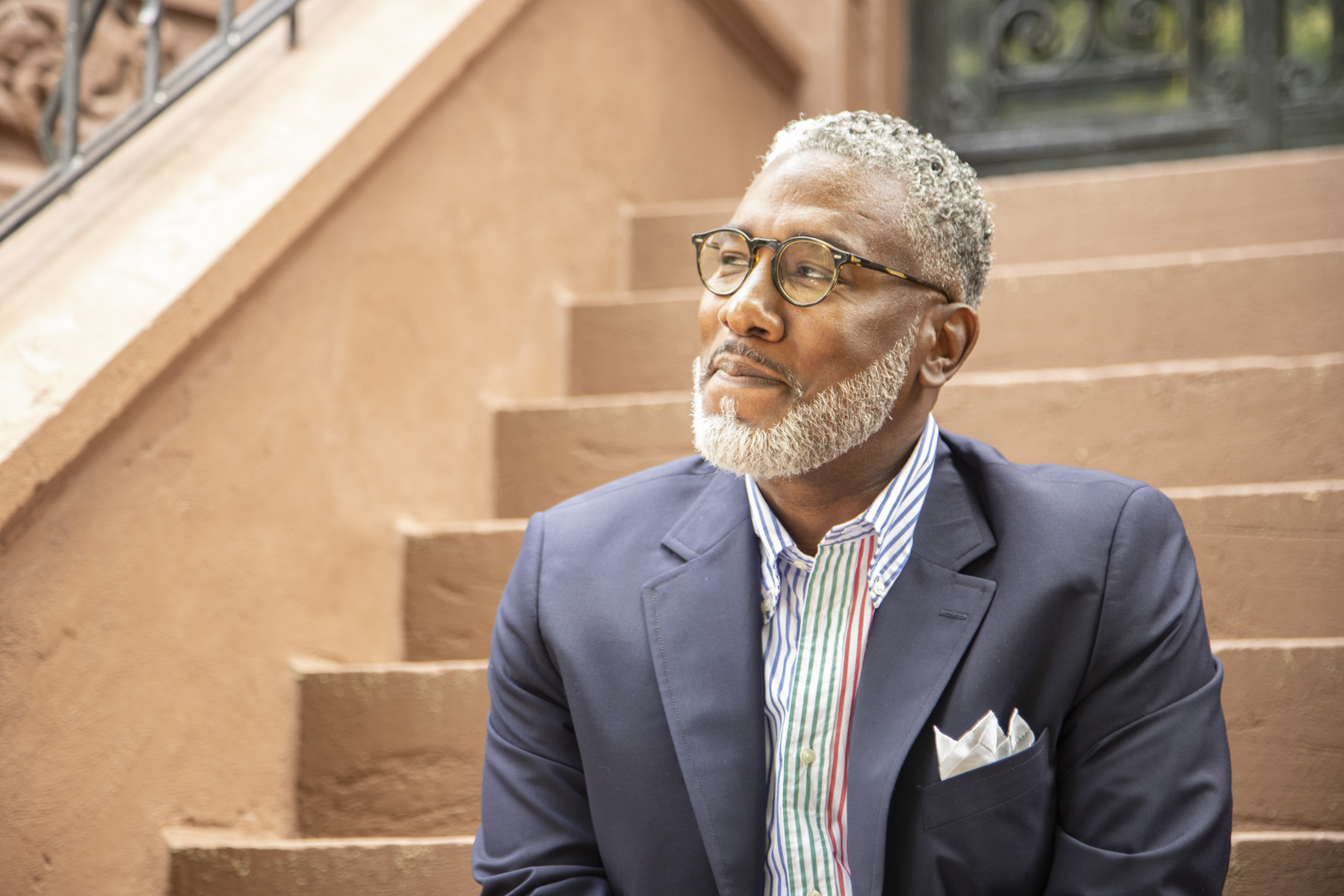
Conrad Tillard

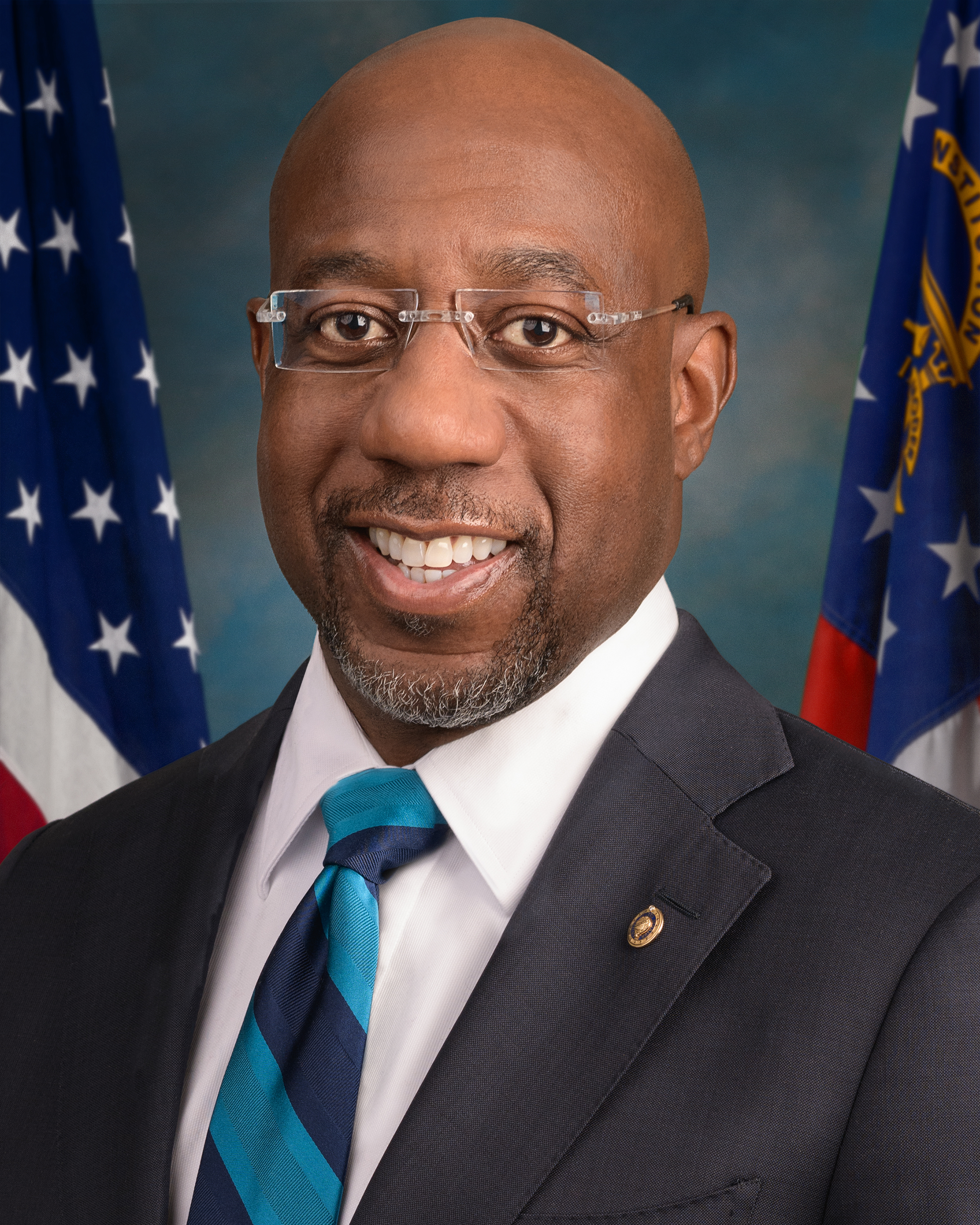
Raphael Warnock

- Rubem Alves – Brazilian theologian and writer
- William Scott Ament (Bachelor of Divinity, 1877) – controversial American missionary to China (1877–1909)
- John Batchelor – radio news show writer and host
- Frederic Mayer Bird – Class of 1860: clergyman, educator, and hymnologist.
- J. Seelye Bixler – 16th president of Colby College
- Dietrich Bonhoeffer – German Lutheran theologian and Nazi resister, attended UTS in 1930 for postgraduate studies and a teaching fellowship under Reinhold Niebuhr
- Anton Boisen – founder of Clinical Pastoral Education (CPE) movement
- Marcus Borg – Biblical scholar and author; former Hundere Distinguished Professor of Religion and Culture at Oregon State University
- Malcolm Boyd – Episcopal priest and author. He was one of the most prominent of the gay clergy to come out of the closet when he did so in 1977. For two years in 1956 and 1957, Boyd engaged in post-graduate studies at Union Theological Seminary where he wrote his first book, Crisis in Communication. He participated in the civil rights and anti-Vietnam War movements in the 1960s.
- Walter Brueggemann – William Marcellus McPheeters professor of Old Testament at Columbia Theological Seminary
- Frederick Buechner – writer, novelist, poet, essayist, theologian, and ordained Presbyterian minister. Buechner described his time at Union at length in his 1982 autobiographical work, The Sacred Journey. In 2008 Union honored Buechner with the Unitas Distinguished Alumni/ae Awards, bestowed upon alumni/ae who exemplify the Seminary's academic breadth, diversity, and inclusiveness.
- David Budbill – poet
- Edwin Otway Burnham (Bachelor of Divinity, 1855) – a rifle shooting Congregational missionary in Sioux Indian territory who could bark a squirrel, swing an axe or dispense Gospel with equal fervor and efficiency.
- Calvin Otis Butts III – senior pastor of the historic Abyssinian Baptist Church in New York City
- W. Sterling Cary (BD 1952) – president of the National Council of Churches from 1972 to 1975
- Gladwyn M. Childs – anthropologist and missionary
- Grigor Cilka – reverend, missionary, teacher and founder of first Protestant parish in Korçë, Albania
- Joseph Gallup Cochran (class of 1847) – reverend, Presbyterian missionary, teacher
- Oliver Crane (1848) – Presbyterian clergy, missionary, Oriental scholar, writer
- Nelson Cruikshank (Master of divinity, 1929) – labor union activist and strategist responsible for the passage of Medicare
- Claudia De la Cruz (MDiv, 2007) – socialist activist and community organizer
- David Dellinger – noted American peace activist and member of the Chicago Seven
- Lynn de Silva (Master of Sacred Theology) – Sri Lankan theologian, former director of the Ecumenical Institute for Study and Dialogue, Methodist minister, and a pioneer in promoting Buddhist–Christian dialogue
- John R. Everett (B.D. 1944) – President of Hollins College, first Chancellor of the Municipal College System of the City of New York, and President of the New School for Social Research
- Helen Flanders Dunbar (B.D. 1927) – early figure in U.S. psychosomatic medicine
- Franklin I. Gamwell – Shailer Mathews Professor of Religious Ethics, the Philosophy of Religion, and Theology at the Divinity School of the University of Chicago
- Francis L. Garrett – Chief of Chaplains of the U.S. Navy
- Beverly Roberts Gaventa – New Testament exegete, theologian, and author most recently of When in Romans
- Jeffrey Grant – lawyer and minister who co-founded Progressive Prison Ministries and White Collar Support Group.
- J. T. Gulick – evolutionary biologist
- Susan E. Goff – suffragan bishop of the Episcopal Diocese of Virginia
- David P. Gushee – Distinguished University Professor of Christian Ethics at Mercer University. Author of 9 books and over 70 articles
- Douglas John Hall – emeritus professor of theology at McGill University, and theologian of the cross.
- Mark Hanson – former Presiding Bishop of the Evangelical Lutheran Church in America.
- Edler Garnet Hawkins – former Moderator of the General Assembly for the United Presbyterian Church in the United States of America.
- Carter Heyward – lesbian feminist theologian and priest in the Episcopal Church
- Richard Holloway – Scottish writer and broadcaster and was formerly Bishop of Edinburgh
- Dwight Hopkins – Professor of Theology at the Divinity School at the University of Chicago
- Myles Horton – co-founder of the Highlander Center
- William H. Hudnut III – former Mayor of Indianapolis, Indiana (1976–1992)
- Ada Maria Isasi-Diaz – Professor of Ethics and Theology at Drew University
- Suzan Johnson Cook – former presidential advisor and United States Ambassador-at-Large for International Religious Freedom (2011–2013)
- Mark Juergensmeyer – Professor of Sociology, Religious Studies, and Global Studies at the University of California at Santa Barbara and Director of the Orfalea Center for Global and International Studies
- Norman J. Kansfield – President New Brunswick Theological Seminary 1993–2005 and Senior Scholar in Residence, Theological School, Drew University
- Mineo Katagiri – Minister and social activist
- James Franklin Kay – Professor of Homiletics and Liturgics at Princeton Theological Seminary
- George R. Lunn – Mayor of Schenectady, New York, Member of the United States House of Representatives, Lieutenant Governor of New York
- Ernest Lyon (1860–1938) – Minister, former United States Ambassador to Liberia, and founder of the Maryland Industrial and Agricultural Institute for Colored Youths.
- Reuben H. Markham – missionary educator to Bulgaria; journalist, Christian Science Monitor; author of numerous books
- Rollo May – existential psychologist
- Rachel Kollock McDowell – religion editor of the New York Times (1920–1948)
- Andrew McLellan – former Moderator of the General Assembly of the Church of Scotland
- James David Manning – pastor in Harlem
- Bruce McLeod (PhD) – Moderator of the United Church of Canada
- William P. Merrill – first president on the Church Peace Union, writer of "Rise Up, O Men of God"
- Frederick Buckley Newell (Bachelor of Divinity, 1916) – Bishop of The Methodist Church
- Henry F. C. Nichols – member of the Wisconsin State Assembly
- Lisa Oz – author and radio and television personality
- Eunice Blanchard Poethig (PhD, 1985) – minister, Presbyterian Church (USA) leader and educator
- Paul Raushenbush – American Baptist minister and Religion Editor for The Huffington Post
- John Bunyan Reeve – first Black student, organized theology department at Howard University
- Scott Rennie – minister of the Church of Scotland at Queen's Cross Church, Aberdeen
- Joseph L. Roberts Jr. – senior pastor of Atlanta's Ebenezer Baptist Church from 1975 to 2005
- James Herman Robinson (1938) – founder of Operation Crossroads Africa, a forerunner of the Peace Corps
- Carl Rogers – pioneering psychologist
- Fleming Rutledge – Episcopal priest and author
- V.C. Samuel – Indian Christian theologian, philosopher and historian
- E. P. Sanders – a principal founder of the New Perspective on Paul movement
- Nathan A. Scott, Jr. – scholar of religion and literature
- Henry Sloane Coffin – President of Union Theological Seminary
- William Gayley Simpson – former associate director of the National Civil Liberties Bureau (American Civil Liberties Union)
- Andrea Smith – Indigenous intellectual and anti-violence activist
- John Sung – a Chinese Christian evangelist who played an instrumental role in the revival movement among the Chinese in mainland China, Taiwan, and Southeast Asia during the 1920s and 1930s and also a staunch defender of traditional Christian values and outspoken opponent of liberal theology
- John Stoltenberg – feminist writer
- Juhanon Mar Thoma – Metropolitan of Marthoma Syrian Church in India
- Norman Thomas – socialist
- Joseph Clarke Thomson – medical missionary to China
- Conrad Tillard (born 1964) – Baptist minister, radio host, author, civil rights activist, and politician
- K. H. Ting – President emeritus of the Three-Self Patriotic Movement and China Christian Council
- Phyllis Trible (b. 1932) – feminist biblical scholar
- Constance Cochnower Virtue – composer who developed the Virtue Notagraph
- Raphael Warnock – U.S. Senator from Georgia (2021-) and senior pastor at Ebenezer Baptist Church in Atlanta
- George W. Webber (1920–2010) – President of the New York Theological Seminary
- Floyd Wilcox – third president of Shimer College
- Delores S. Williams – womanist theologian
- Walter Wink – Biblical scholar and activist
- Clemis Abraham – Former head of the Malankara Syriac Knanaya Archdiocese (1951–2002)

== See also ==
- Union Seminary Quarterly Review
