= Kollock =

Kollock may refer to:

In people

- Florence E. Kollock (1848-1925), American Universalist minister and lecturer
- Peter Kollock (1959-2009), American sociologist
- Shepard Kollock (1750-1839), American editor and printer
- Rachel Kollock McDowell (1880-1949), American journalist

In places

- Kollock, South Carolina, USA
