= William Osborne McDowell =

American businessman

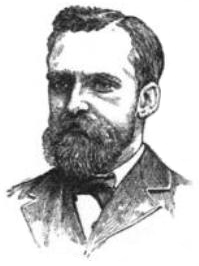
- Born: April 10, 1848; Somerset, New Jersey
- Died: March 12, 1927 (aged 78); Newark, New Jersey
- Occupation: Businessman
- Spouse: Josephine Timanus (m. 1873; died 1921)
- Children: 7
- Relatives: Shepard Kollock (great-grandfather)

William Osborne McDowell (1848–1927) was a financier and businessman. He founded numerous patriotic organizations in the late nineteenth century including the Sons of the American Revolution. With expanding international interests, he supported Cuban independence, helped found the League of Peace in 1908 and served as its president. He made his wealth from his investment firm, specializing in railroads, mining, and land speculation.

== Early life ==
William Osborne McDowell was born on April 10, 1848, in Somerset, New Jersey. He was the son of Dr. Augustus William McDowell and Anna M. (Osborne) McDowell.

== Career ==
McDowell founded McDowell Brothers and Company in New York City, an investment firm specializing in silver mining, railroads, and land speculation. He reorganized the Montclair Railroad of New Jersey, the New York, Ontario and Western Railway of New Jersey, and the Midland Railroad of New Jersey, and consolidated many others. He was president of the San Antonio Silver Mining Company of Nevada, the Patent Company of Newark and New York, the Coal and Iron Exchange and the Greenwood Lake Improvement Company.

== Organizations ==
In the late nineteenth century, he became active in civic affairs. McDowell was a founding trustee in 1881 of the American Institute of Christian Philosophy, together with Cornelius Vanderbilt II and several learned ministers. It was intended to promote education in leading questions of religion and science.

He founded the Cuban American League of the U.S., which supported the fight for Cuban independence in the late nineteenth century. McDowell initiated the Pan Republic Congress, a business organization that worked for the standardization of international weights and measures, customs regulations, and the resolution of international disputes.

His interest in international affairs led him to become a leader in the universal peace movement of the late nineteenth and early twentieth centuries. He was among the founders of the Human Freedom League and the League of Peace. In 1908 McDowell drafted a Constitution of the United Nations of the World with political economists. The industrialist Andrew Carnegie was also among the founders, and President Theodore Roosevelt supported the League of Peace in a 1910 speech.

On October 5, 1912, McDowell as president of the League of Peace, delivered a tribute in London to the poet Alfred Lord Tennyson, who dreamed of "the Parliament of man, the Federation of world."

In 1913 McDowell attended, as a representative of the State of New York, the dedication of the Peace Palace, the site of the International Court of Justice, in The Hague.

=== Sons of the American Revolution ===
He also became interested in patriotic organizations following the celebration of the United States Centennial in Philadelphia and New York. He founded the Sons of the American Revolution, assisted in the founding of the Daughters of the American Revolution, and founded the Order of the American Eagle. He became associated with the National Council of Patriotic Organizations and a trustee of its Library Americana, led by Henry Baldwin (1832-1905), another industrialist.

McDowell had founded the New Jersey Society of the Sons of the Revolution (SR) in 1889, but he resented the New York Society's insistence at the time that other state societies be "auxiliaries" to the New York Society. In addition, the New York Society intended the SR to be an elite social organization. McDowell wanted the heritage organization to become a mass movement with broad and generous membership requirements, to recognize descendants of patriots who had a variety of roles in supporting the Revolution - not necessarily in military service.

Unwilling to accept the limits imposed by the New York Society, McDowell organized 19 state societies of the SR in early 1889. When the New York Society refused to rescind its policy that societies in other states be auxiliaries of the New York Society, McDowell called a convention of the other state societies at Fraunces Tavern in New York City. At this convention, he founded the Sons of the American Revolution on April 30, 1889, to represent his vision of a broader based society. McDowell was elected president of the new organization the same day. Although efforts were made the reconcile the two organizations, they ultimately were unable to accommodate each other's demands.

In April 1891 McDowell became a member of the District of Columbia Society of the SAR but was dropped from membership in 1898. He was assigned national membership number 2013 and District Society membership number 213. He was retroactively assigned national membership number 1 and New Jersey Society membership number 1 at a later date. (This is evidenced by the fact that his New Jersey Society application references his District of Columbia Society application.)

McDowell was active in other heritage and patriotic activities: he raised money to complete the Statue of Liberty’s pedestal, and lobbied for the establishment of a national university in Washington, D.C. He initiated the Columbian Liberty Bell project, which sent a replica of the Liberty Bell on tour throughout the U.S.

McDowell was a companion of the District of Columbia Commandery of the Military Order of the Loyal Legion of the United States by right of inheritance from his father, Brevet Colonel Augustus William McDowell, who had served as a surgeon in the Union Army.

=== Daughters of the American Revolution ===
McDowell also played a role in founding of the Daughters of the American Revolution (DAR) in 1890. The DAR was founded by women descendants of Revolutionary-era patriots; they were interested in historic preservation and irritated at having been excluded from the men's organizations. The first President General of the DAR was Caroline Harrison, wife of President Benjamin Harrison.

As quickly as the societies formed, differences arose leading to new societies. In 1891 Flora Adams Darling (Vice Regent of the DAR) resigned from the DAR to form the Daughters of the Revolution (DR); it became a more "exclusive" society, as it would not accept "collateral descendants" as members and was limited to direct descendants. Her actions were also prompted by what she said were McDowell's ambition to exploit the SAR and DAR as organizations on which to build a presidential campaign.

== Marriage and family ==
McDowell was the son of Dr. Augustus W. McDowell (1820-1878), who served as a surgeon in the Union Army during the American Civil War. Dr. McDowell was commissioned on January 1, 1863, and rose to the rank of brevet colonel in the Union Army.

McDowell married Josephine Timanus (1850–1921) in 1873. They had seven children: Pauline T. McDowell Akins (1874-1968), Nora McDowell Culver (d. 1944), fraternal twins Rachel Kollock McDowell (1880–1949) and Malcolm McDowell (1880–1920), William Timanus McDowell, Ezra Osborne McDowell (1886–1979) and Eulilee McDowell Cook, whom they reared in the Presbyterian Church. (Different surnames for girls are their married names).

Their daughter Rachel K. McDowell became a reporter for the Newark Evening News (1902), religious news editor of the New York Herald (1908), and the first Religion Editor of the New York Times in 1920, leading in that position until 1948. In 1935 Time magazine described her as "probably the ablest religious editor of any U. S. newspaper".

Another daughter, Pauline T. McDowell Akins, was one of the first members of the DAR in 1890 at the age of 16. She was the last survivor of the original members of the DAR.

William Osborne McDowell died in Newark on March 12, 1927.
