= Joseph L. Roberts Jr. =

American Baptist pastor

- Church: Ebenezer Baptist Church

Personal details
- Born: February 17, 1935 Chicago (Illinois), U.S.
- Died: February 15, 2015 (aged 79)
- Denomination: Baptist
- Spouse: Esther Wortham
- Children: 3
- Occupation: Pastor
- Education: Knoxville College; Union Theological Seminary; Princeton Theological Seminary

Joseph L. Roberts Jr. (February 17, 1935 - February 15, 2015) was an American Baptist pastor. He was the senior pastor of Atlanta's Ebenezer Baptist Church from 1975 to 2005.

== Biography ==
He was born in Chicago (Illinois) on February 17, 1935. He studied at Knoxville College and earned a Bachelor of Arts in 1956. He then he studied theology at the Union Theological Seminary, where he received a Master of Divinity. He also studied theology at Princeton Theological Seminary and earned a Master of Theology.

=== Ministry ===
He served in the administration of the Presbyterian Church in the United States of America and also served as pastor of Weequahic Presbyterian Church in Newark, New Jersey. Subsequently, he became pastor at Elmwood United Presbyterian Church in East Orange, New Jersey.

In 1975, he became the senior pastor of Ebenezer Baptist Church in Atlanta. He founded a ministry for teenage mothers, tutoring programs and a food cooperative. During his ministry, the church welcomed over 2,000 new members, prompting him to plan the construction of a new building with a 1700-seat auditorium, across from the old one. The new sanctuary's dedication took place in 1999.

He left his position as senior pastor in 2005.

== Personal life ==
He married Esther Wortham and had three children. He died on February 15, 2015.

== Awards and honors ==
He has received 5 Doctorates of Divinity (honorary doctorates) from the following universities: Johnson C. Smith University, Interdenominational Theological Center, Morehouse College, Franklin College (Indiana) and Kalamazoo College.
