= Rachel Kollock McDowell =

American journalist

Rachel Kollock McDowell (January 11, 1880 – August 30, 1949) was an American journalist and the first religion editor of The New York Times, serving in that position from 1920 to 1948. She covered the city's religious activities, from weekly sermons to church construction, community organizing and welfare. During decades of rapid social change, she was known for her connections with Protestant and Catholic clergy, as well as Jewish rabbis, and paid special attention to interfaith efforts. She spoke nationally on religion, appearing at Chautauqua, and had a weekly radio show for a quarter of a century.

== Early life and education ==
The daughter of Josephine Timanus and William Osborn McDowell, Rachel and her twin brother Malcolm were born in Newark, New Jersey, in 1880 as the third and fourth children of seven. Their father was a financier and businessman working in New York, with active interests in railroads and mining. He was also a civic organizer, founding the Sons of the American Revolution and helping with founding the Daughters of the American Revolution in the late nineteenth century. In addition to such heritage organizations, he supported Cuban independence from Spain and worked for international peace movements.

McDowell was educated in Newark and grew up in a strict Presbyterian household whose members attended three church services every Sunday. From an early age, she was interested in writing, and at the age of 15 was paid for her poem on the death of Queen Victoria, published in The New York Journal. She attended college at Union Theological Seminary in New York City.

== Career ==
McDowell was a committed career woman, becoming the only one of the seven McDowell children who did not marry. Years later, she said, "I had many beaux and many honest-to-goodness propositions, but I wanted to be an entity, not just a Mrs. Somebody."

As a young woman, she went to work for the Prudential Life Insurance Company in a job she disliked. Seeking a writing job, at age 22 she obtained a position as a reporter covering weddings and other society topics for the Newark Evening News. In 1908, she left the Newark paper for her first New York City newspaper job.

Beginning in 1908, she developed a "brilliant career" as a religious reporter and news editor of the New York Herald but worried when the paper was sold in 1920. She was hired the same week of the sale announcement by The New York Times. She was the first Religion Editor appointed at the Times and worked in that position until 1948.

Known for her pursuit of stories, McDowell knew clergy and rabbis throughout the city, from the top of the Protestant and Catholic hierarchies on down and a variety of Jewish rabbis. She was particularly interested in interfaith movements. She featured Catholic and Protestant clergy, as well as rabbis, in her regular Saturday features. Her pre-eminence in the field of religious news reporting earned her the nickname "Lady Bishop."

The reporter Meyer Berger of The New York Times tells the following story about her:

When Bishop Manning called a press conference one day to announce a $10,000,000 campaign for the Cathedral of St. John the Divine, he held up his statement until she got there – 50 minutes late. "Miss McDowell," he told her in hurtful reproach, "we have been waiting for you for 50 minutes." A tall young man at one side of the room answered before Miss McDowell had quite caught her breath. "Your Reverence," he said quietly, "Miss McDowell – and The Times – are worth waiting 50 minutes for. Her defender, head of the Bishop's New York campaign committee, was Franklin D. Roosevelt."

McDowell recounted that one of her most notable memories was getting trapped in the mausoleum of Princess Anastasia of Greece after her funeral in 1923 at Woodlawn Cemetery in New York. An American heiress who married into the Greek royal family, the Princess had left instructions in her will that she should be interred with her parents at Woodlawn. McDowell had managed to learn the time and place of the secret burial, and gained access. After witnessing the funeral she went into the tomb to look at the names on other caskets and found herself locked in. She was unsuccessful in summoning help, but prayed until finally the door opened. It was an example of her persistence to get "exclusives"; she was credited with scores of them.

In 1935, Time magazine described her as "probably the ablest religious editor of any U. S. newspaper". While at the Herald, she founded the Pure Language League for newspaper writers, to discourage the use of blasphemous and profane language, and carried her campaign to the Times. She was known there for her annual message on New Year's Eve reminding writers to use pure language.

A devout Presbyterian, McDowell was invited to lecture on religion at venues across the country, with regular sessions at Chautauqua. For several years, she had a weekly program on religion on the radio. For more than 25 years, she wrote a weekly article for The Presbyterian (now The Presbyterian Outlook. After meeting with Pope Pius XI in 1935, she wrote about it and received in response more than 1,000 letters from around the world. Her short account was reprinted as My Audience with the Holy Father in 1936.

McDowell retired as result of ill health on December 31, 1948, and died less than a year later on August 30, 1949.

== Civic and professional life ==
McDowell was active in professional organizations, such as the New York City Women’s Press Club, the League of American PEN Women, and New Jersey Women’s Press Club. She was a member of the Daughters of the American Revolution and supported its educational activities.
