= Joseph C. Hough Jr. =

American academic

- Title: interim president of Claremont Graduate University
- Spouse: Heidi

Academic background
- Education: Wake Forest University; Yale University

Joseph Carl Hough Jr. was an ordained minister in the United Church of Christ and served as the interim president of Claremont Graduate University in Claremont, California from 2009 to 2010. He was an author, coauthor, and editor of several books.

Hough was the fifteenth president of Union Theological Seminary in the City of New York where he served for 9 years. He served as the William E. Dodge Professor of Social Ethics Emeritus.

Hough also worked with Vanderbilt University and Claremont School of Theology.

== Education ==
Hough completed his undergraduate studies at Wake Forest University and his B.D., M.A., and Ph.D. degrees from Yale University.

== Death ==
Hough died on May 15, 2023 at the age of 89 after a five year battle with Alzheimer's disease.

== Awards ==
He has been awarded various honour during his career.

- Doctor of Divinity from Wake Forest University
- Centennial Medal for Distinguished Services from Claremont Graduate University
- Joshua Award from the Jewish Federation Council
- Alumni Award for Distinction in Theological Education from Yale Divinity School
- "Urban Angels" Award from New York Theological Seminary
- Distinguished Service Award from the Association of Theological Schools in the United States and Canada

== Works ==
=== Books ===
- Hough, Joseph C. (1968). Black Power and White Protestants: a Christian response to the new Negro pluralism. New York: Oxford University Press. OCLC 312410.
- ———; Rhoades, Dan D. (1971). Project Understanding: a report and evaluation. Claremont, CA: School of Theology at Claremont. OCLC 874405025.
- ———; McConahay, John B. (1975). Value Roots of Symbolic Racism. Durham, NC: Institute of Policy Sciences and Public Affairs, Duke University. OCLC 2236074.
- ——— (1981). The Politics of Theological Education. Occasional papers - United Methodist Board of Higher Education and Ministry. Nashville, TN: United Methodist Board of Higher Education and Ministry. OCLC 9486281.
- ———; Cobb, John B. (1985). Christian Identity and Theological Education. Scholars Press Studies in Religious and Theological Scholarship. Chico, CA: Scholars Press. ISBN 978-0-891-30855-3. OCLC 12107437.
- ———; Wheeler, Barbara G., eds. (1988). Beyond Clericalism: The Congregation as a Focus for Theological Education. Scholars Press Studies in Religious and Theological Scholarship. Atlanta, GA: Scholars Press. ISBN 978-1-555-40235-8. OCLC 18417593.
- ———; Griffin, David Ray, eds. (1991). Theology and the University: essays in honor of John B. Cobb, Jr. Albany, NY: State University of New York Press. ISBN 978-0-791-40592-5. OCLC 21674143.
- ——— (1992). The Theological Work of the University Scholar. Theology in the University. Pittsburgh, PA: Association of Theological Schools. OCLC 34429199. - approximate date

=== Articles ===
- ——— (1977). "Christian Social Ethics as Advocacy". Journal of Religious Ethics. 5 (1): 115–133.
