= Ebenezer Baptist Church =

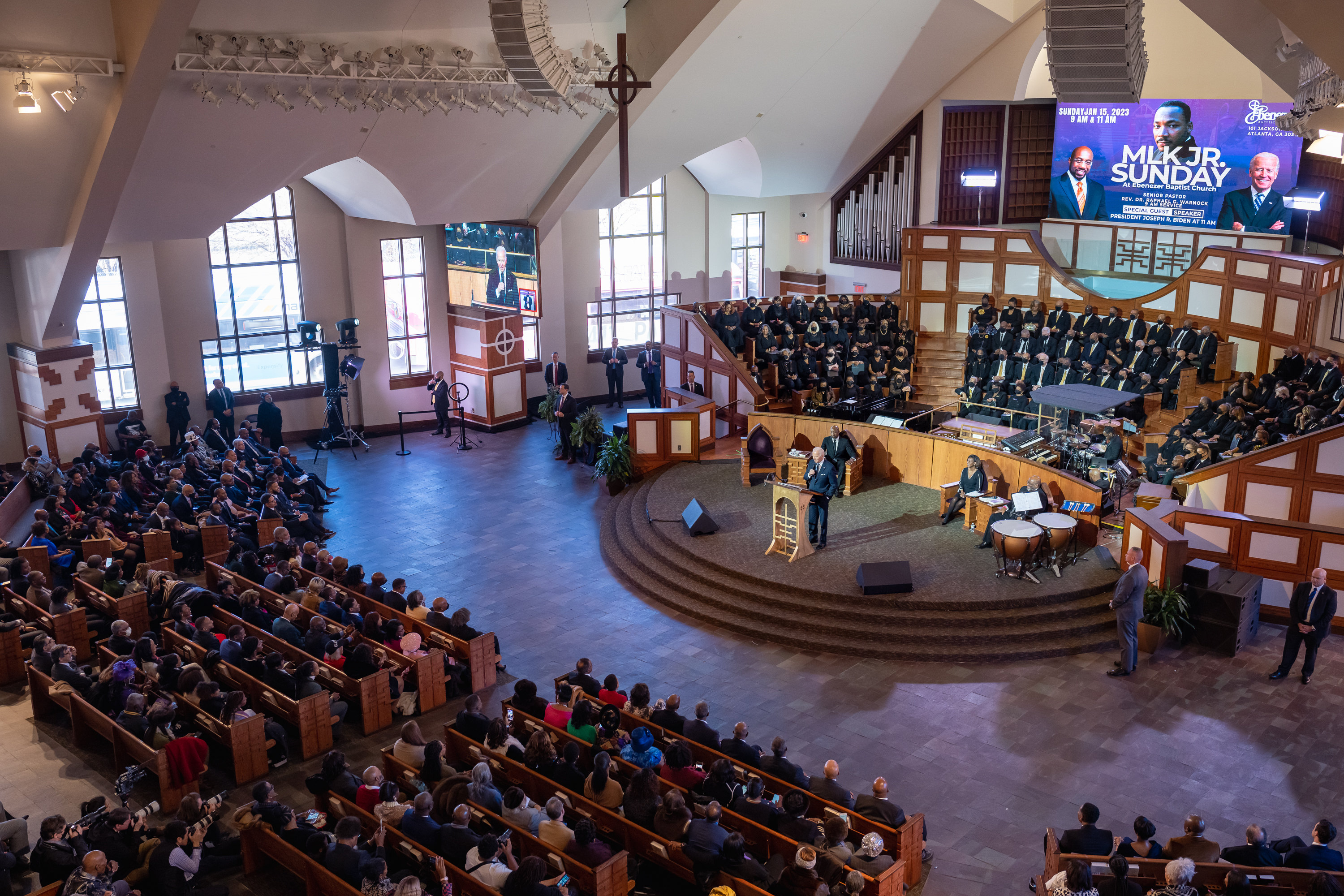
- Service in 2023 in the Horizon Sanctuary (built 1999) with President Biden speaking
- Ebenezer Baptist Church
- 33°45′19″N 84°22′27″W
- Location: Atlanta, Georgia
- Country: United States
- Denomination: Baptist
- Website: ebenezeratl.org

History
- Founded: 1886

Clergy
- Pastor: Rev. Raphael Warnock

Ebenezer Baptist Church is a progressive Baptist megachurch located in Atlanta, Georgia, United States, affiliated with the Progressive National Baptist Convention and American Baptist Churches USA. It was the church where Dr. Martin Luther King Sr. was pastor from the 1930s and co-pastor together with his sons Dr. Martin Luther King Jr. from 1960 until his assassination in 1968 and Alfred Daniel King from 1968 until his death in 1969. It hosted the funerals of both Dr. King and, in its later-expanded sanctuary, congressman John Lewis. United States Senator Raphael Warnock has been the church's senior pastor since 2005. Its historic church building and expanded sanctuary building are located in the historic area designated as the Martin Luther King Jr. National Historical Park.

== History ==
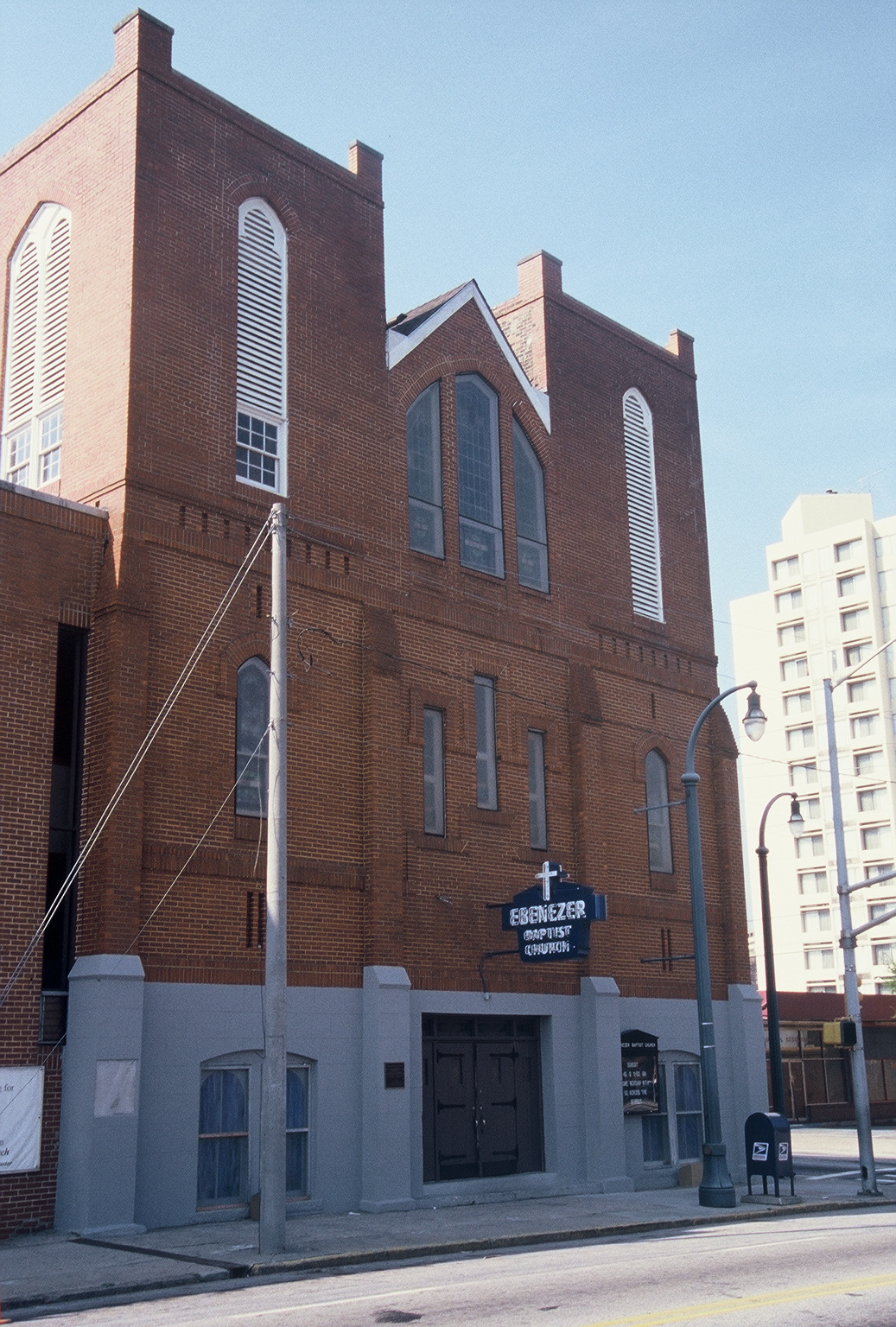
First building of the Church

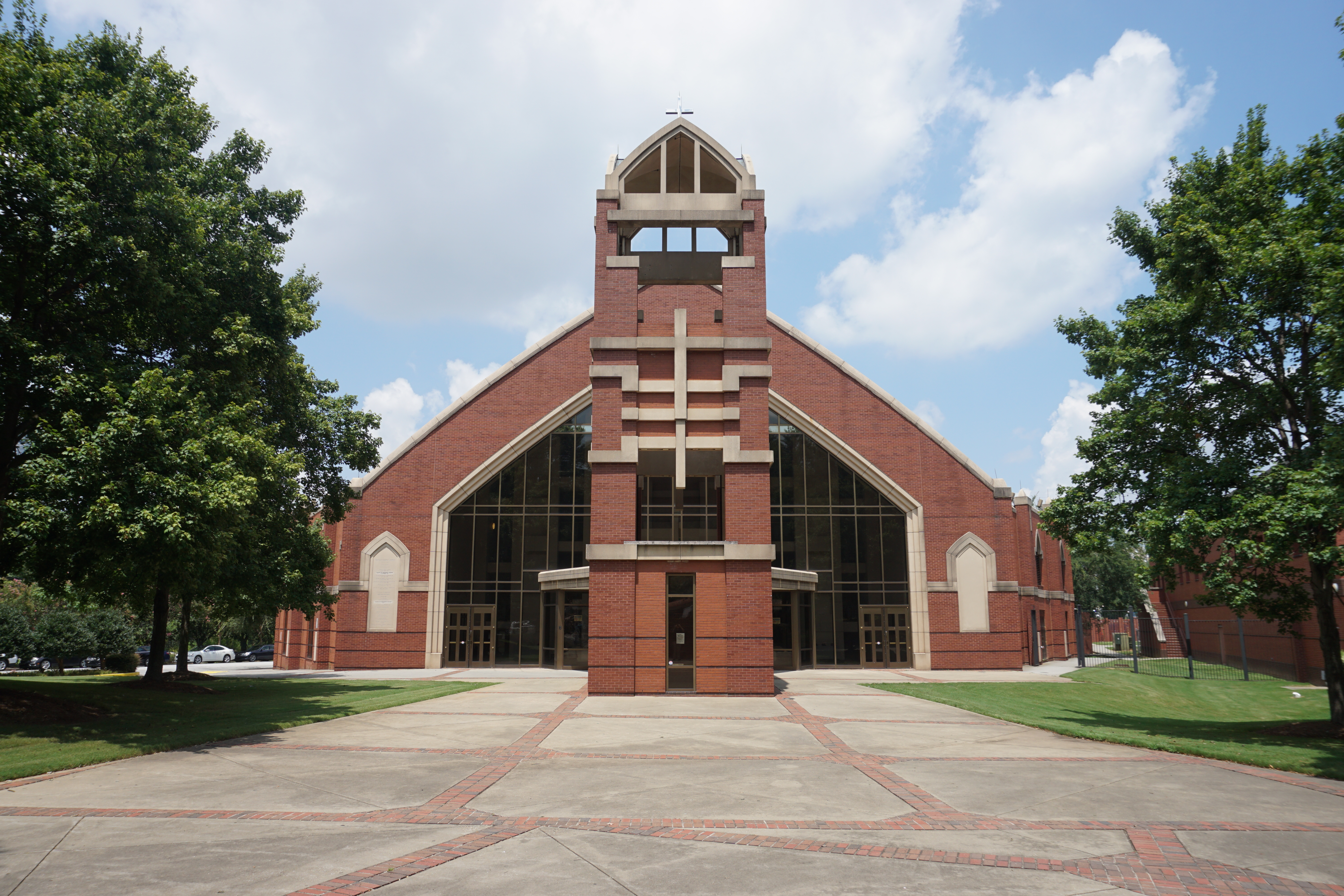
Horizon Sanctuary

The church was founded in 1886 by Pastor John A. Parker and eight people, on Airline Street. The church's name derives from the Books of Samuel, where the Prophet Samuel names a place "Ebenezer", meaning "stone of help", to commemorate God helping the Israelites defeat the Philistines.

Adam Daniel Williams (maternal grandfather of Martin Luther King Jr.) became pastor in 1894, and the church had only 13 members. It grew to 400 members by 1903 and in 1913, the church had 750 people. In 1922, the building was dedicated. In 1927, Martin Luther King Sr. became an assistant pastor, then senior pastor in 1931. In 1960, Martin Luther King Jr. became co-pastor of the church with his father until his assassination in 1968.

In 1957, the church hosted a meeting of Baptist leaders at the invitation of Pastor Martin Luther King Jr. resulting in the founding of the Southern Christian Leadership Conference for the end of racial segregation in the United States.

In 1975, Joseph L. Roberts Jr. became senior pastor.

In 1999, a new 1,700-seat church building called the Horizon Sanctuary was inaugurated within the Martin Luther King Jr. National Historical Park.

Since 2005, U.S. Senator Raphael Warnock has been the senior pastor of Ebenezer Baptist Church; he is the fifth person to serve as Ebenezer's senior pastor since its founding. On January 30, 2020, Warnock announced his campaign for Kelly Loeffler's Senate seat during the 2020 special election. In a special runoff election on January 5, 2021, Reverend Warnock defeated Loeffler receiving 51% of the popular vote. With this victory, Warnock made history by becoming the first Black senator from the state of Georgia. On December 6, 2022, Warnock made further history by becoming the first Black senator from Georgia elected to a full six-year term.

The funeral of Martin Luther King Jr. was held at the church on April 9, 1968. The funeral of Martin Luther King Sr. was held at the church on November 17, 1984. The funeral of Rayshard Brooks was held on June 23, 2020, at the church. The funeral of John Lewis was held on July 30, 2020, at the church.

In 2021, it had 6,000 members.

== Beliefs ==
=== Marriage ===
In January 2014, Pastor Raphael Warnock affirmed his support for blessings of same-sex marriage.

== Pastors ==
The pastors of Ebenezer Baptist Church since its foundation have been as follows:

- 1886–1894: The Reverend John A. Parker
- 1894–1931: The Reverend Adam Daniel Williams
- 1931–1975: The Reverend Doctor Martin Luther King Sr.; with three co-pastors
  - 1960–1968: The Reverend Doctor Martin Luther King Jr. as co-pastor
  - 1968–1969: The Reverend Alfred Daniel King as co-pastor
  - 1971–1975: The Reverend Doctor Otis Moss Jr. as co-pastor
- 1975–2005: The Reverend Joseph L. Roberts Jr.
- 2005–present: The Honorable Reverend Doctor Raphael Warnock, United States Senator since 2021.

== Martin Luther King Day ==
Many American presidents have come to commemorate Martin Luther King Day at Ebenezer Baptist Church.

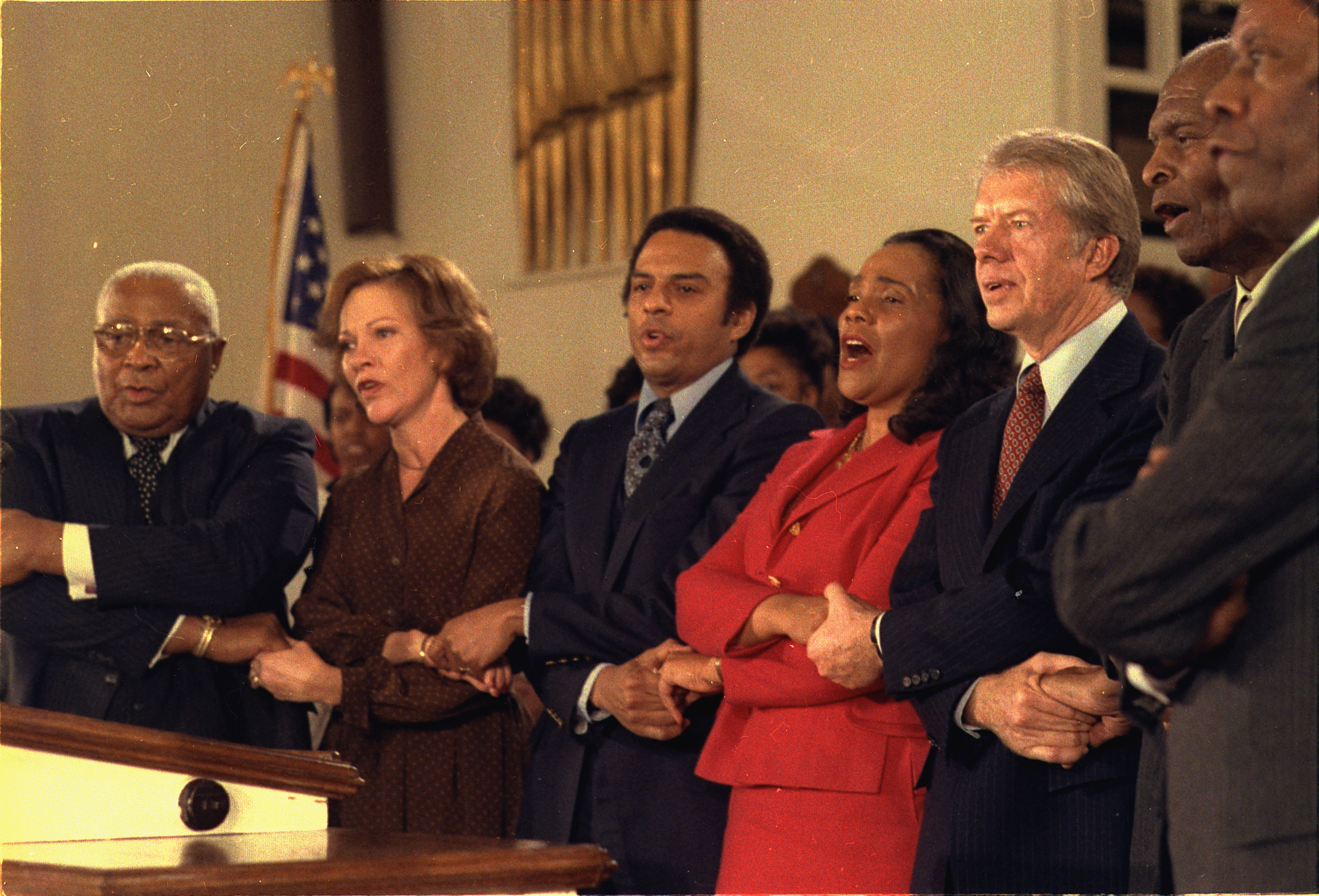
Martin Luther King Sr., Rosalynn Carter, Andrew Young, Coretta Scott King, and President Jimmy Carter in 1979

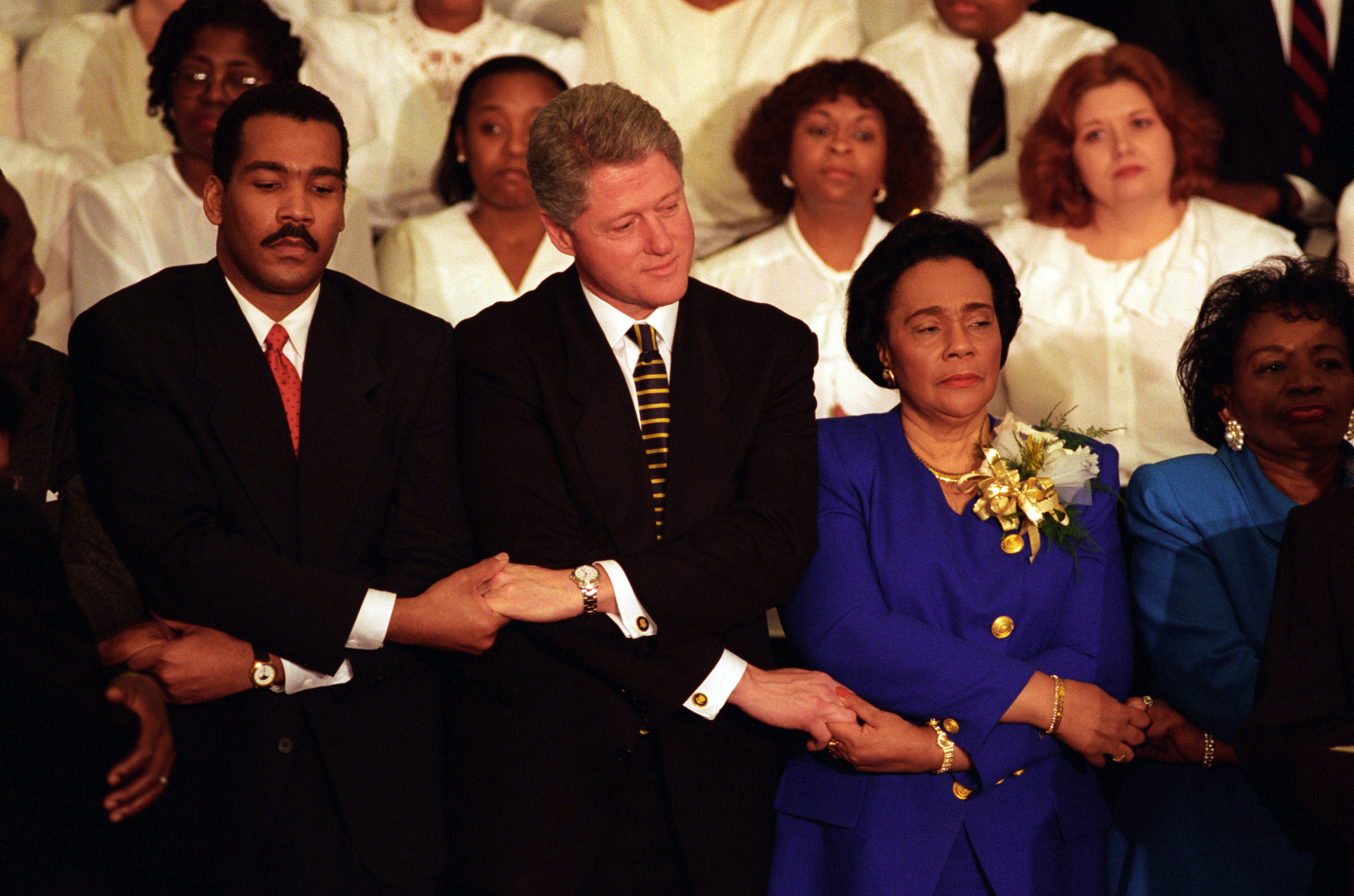
Dexter King, President Bill Clinton, and Coretta Scott King in 1996

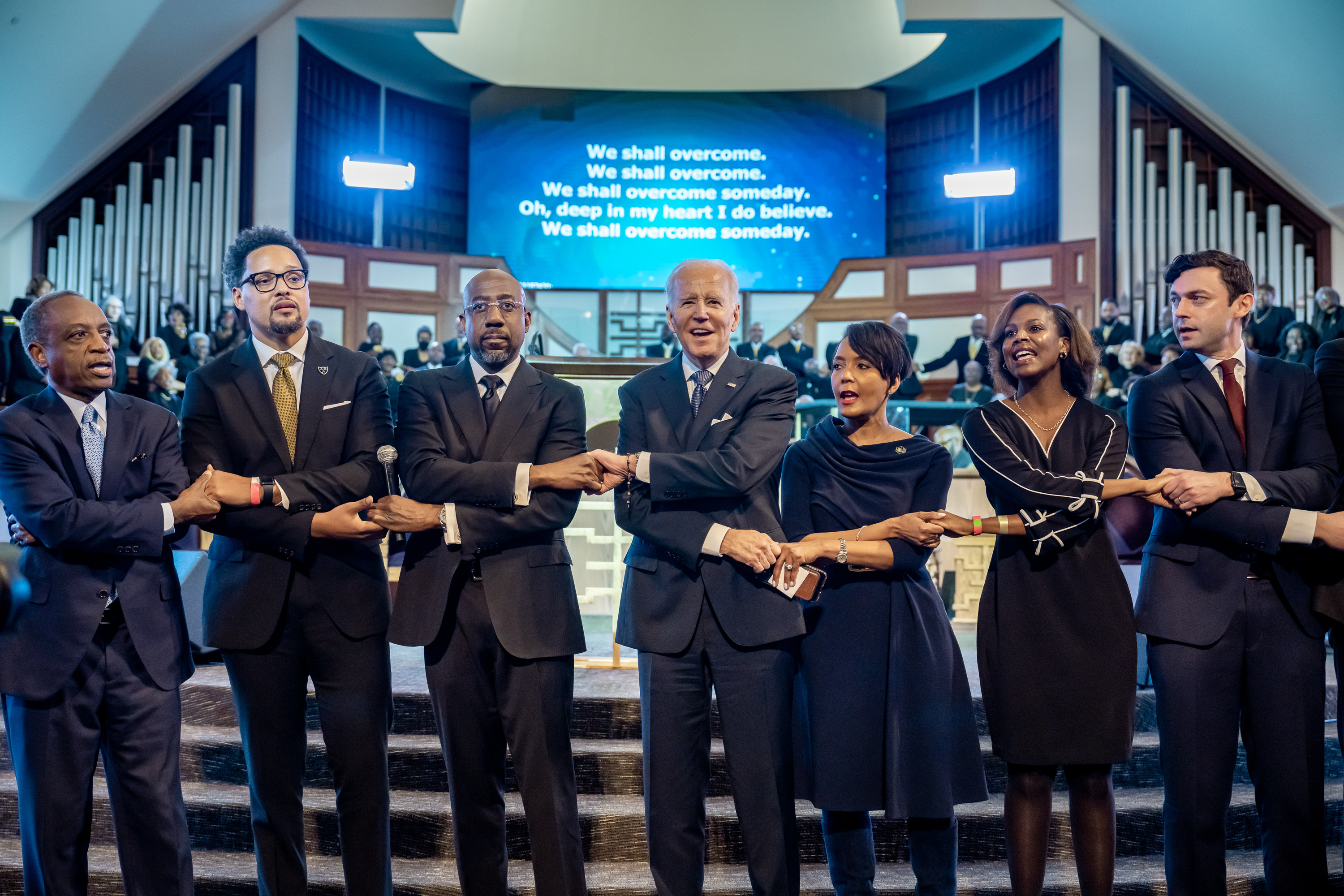
Raphael Warnock and President Joe Biden in 2023
